= Deaths in November 2024 =

The following is a list of notable deaths in November 2024.

Entries for each day are listed alphabetically by surname. A typical entry lists information in the following sequence:

- Name, age, country of citizenship at birth, subsequent country of citizenship (if applicable), reason for notability, cause of death (if known), and reference.

== November 2024 ==
=== 1 ===
- Rohit Bal, 63, Indian fashion designer, heart attack.
- Marcel Bédard, 84, Canadian politician, mayor of Beauport (1970–1980), Quebec MNA (1973–1976).
- Kulada Kumar Bhattacharya, 91, Indian radio artist, actor (Raamdhenu, Maj Rati Keteki) and director, pneumonia and heart problems.
- William B. Bridges, 89, American engineer and inventor.
- Morten Stig Christensen, 65, Danish Olympic handball player (1976, 1980, 1984) and sports administrator, cardiac arrest.
- Diane Coleman, 71, American lawyer and disability rights advocate, sepsis.
- Bibek Debroy, 69, Indian economist.
- João Scognamiglio Clá Dias, 85, Brazilian Roman Catholic priest and religious writer, founder of the Heralds of the Gospel.
- Alastair Down, 68, English journalist (Sporting Life, Racing Post) and broadcaster (Channel 4 Racing).\
- Andrew H. Eschenfelder, 99, American physicist.
- Fantick, 69, Brazilian footballer (Botafogo, Portuguesa), pancreatic cancer.
- Guruprasad, 52, Indian film director (Eddelu Manjunatha, Mata, Director's Special), suicide by hanging.
- Chuck Haytaian, 86, American politician, member (1982–1996) and speaker (1992–1996) of the New Jersey General Assembly.
- Faye Leung, 92, Canadian businesswoman.
- Fay Marles, 98, Australian public servant and academic administrator, member of the VEOHRC (1977–1987) and chancellor of the University of Melbourne (2001–2005).
- Richard Bernard Moore, 59, American convicted murderer, execution by lethal injection.
- Camilo Mortágua, 90, Portuguese antifascist militant, participant in the Santa Maria hijacking.
- Abderrahmane Mostefa, 76, Algerian documentary filmmaker, photographer and journalist.
- Kanji Nishio, 89, Japanese literary scholar.
- Peter Oloo-Aringo, 83, Kenyan politician, MP (1974–1988, 1997–2002).
- Luiz Onmura, 64, Brazilian judoka, Olympic bronze medallist (1984), squamous-cell carcinoma.
- Peanut, c. 7, American eastern gray squirrel, Instagram subject, euthanasia.
- Alexander Pines, 79, American chemist.
- Abdul Al-Rahim Ghulam Rabbani, 56–57, Pakistani Guantanamo Bay detainee.
- Austin Roberts, 79, American singer ("Rocky").
- Ida G. Ruben, 95, American politician, member of the Maryland House of Delegates (1975–1987) and Senate (1987–2007).
- Michael Ruse, 84, British-born Canadian philosopher of science.
- Mohamed Salimullah, 80, Bangladeshi footballer (BJMC, Bangladesh national team) and coach.
- Zaal Samadashvili, 71, Georgian writer.
- Juan José Sebreli, 93, Argentine sociologist, essayist and philosopher.
- Gianpaolo Silvestri, 70, Italian journalist and politician, senator (2006–2008).
- Tommy Smith, 76, American baseball player (Cleveland Indians, Seattle Mariners).

=== 2 ===
- Mirta Acuña de Baravalle, 99, Argentine human rights activist, co-founder of Mothers of Plaza de Mayo and Grandmothers of Plaza de Mayo.
- Wolfgang Börnsen, 82, German politician, MP (1987–2013).
- Cassius, Australian saltwater crocodile, largest crocodile in captivity. (death announced on this date)
- Annie Choong, 90, Malaysian Olympic sprinter (1956), complications from dementia.
- Yaakov Cohen, 66, Moroccan-born Israeli actor, comedian, and stand-up artist, complications from Parkinson's disease.
- Mack Daughtry, 78, American basketball player (Carolina Cougars, Harlem Globetrotters, Wilkes-Barre Barons).
- Frog, 76, American writer and vendor of joke books, COVID-19.
- Janey Godley, 63, Scottish stand-up comedian and writer, ovarian cancer.
- Len Green, 88, English footballer (Darlington).
- Tomasz Gruszecki, 78, Polish economist and politician.
- Jonathan Haze, 95, American actor (The Little Shop of Horrors, The Terror, It Conquered the World).
- Darrel Janz, 83, Canadian newscaster (CFCN-TV).
- William B. Jensen, 76, American chemist and chemical historian.
- Dub Jones, 99, American football player (Miami Seahawks, Brooklyn Dodgers, Cleveland Browns) and coach.
- Kamala, 49, Sri Lankan Asian elephant, euthanized.
- Alain Madalle, 87, French politician, deputy (1993–1997).
- Hippolyte Piroux, 94, French farmer and writer.
- Clement Quartey, 86, Ghanaian boxer, Olympic silver medallist (1960).
- Alan Rachins, 82, American actor (L.A. Law, Dharma & Greg, Showgirls), heart failure.
- Seo Sang-hong, 75, South Korean lawyer and judge, chief secretary of the constitutional court (2005–2007).
- Paul Stephenson, 87, British community worker and civil rights activist (Bristol Bus Boycott), complications from dementia.
- Amos Utuama, 77, Nigerian politician, deputy governor of Delta State (2007–2015).
- Henry Wynn, 79, British statistician, cancer.

=== 3 ===
- Flint Breckinridge, 64, American politician, member of the Oklahoma House of Representatives (1993–1997).
- Louis Cane, 80, French painter and sculptor.
- Stephanie Chasteen, 52, American physicist, glioblastoma.
- Abderrazak Cheraït, 86–87, Tunisian writer and politician, mayor of Tozeur (1995–2008), deputy (2014–2019).
- Paul Engelen, 75, British make-up artist (Star Wars: Episode I – The Phantom Menace, Game of Thrones, Mary Shelley's Frankenstein), cancer.
- Huckleberry Fox, 50, American actor (Terms of Endearment, Misunderstood, The Blue Yonder), prostate cancer.
- John Gottschalk, 81, American businessman, CEO and publisher of Omaha World-Herald (1989–2008) and president of the Boy Scouts of America (2008–2010).
- Quincy Jones, 91, American Hall of Fame record producer (Thriller, "We Are the World"), composer ("Soul Bossa Nova"), and arranger, 28-time Grammy winner, pancreatic cancer.
- Andy Leek, 66, English musician (Dexys Midnight Runners), songwriter and poet, complications from Parkinson's disease.
- Mark Lifman, 57, South African businessman, shot.
- Helena Luke, 65–66, Indian actress (Judaai, Mere Saath Chal, Ek Naya Rishta).
- Dina Mariana, 59, Indonesian singer and actress.
- Kathleen McGee, 43, Canadian comedian and columnist (BeatRoute), colon cancer.
- Jean McLane, 98, American politician, member of the Montana House of Representatives (1977–1979, 1981–1983).
- Mandisa Monakali, 64, South African women's and children's rights activist.
- Herby Moreau, 56, Canadian journalist.
- Ed de Noorlander, 79, Dutch Olympic decathlete (1968).
- Eric Rimmington, 98, English painter.
- Van Ritshie, 80, American voice-over artist and radio host.
- Maita Sanchez, 55, Filipino actress (Sa Dulo ng Baril, Batas ng Lansangan) and politician, mayor of Pagsanjan (2010–2019), endometrial cancer.
- Peter Schnell, 88, German lawyer and politician, member of the Landtag of Bavaria (1966–1972) and mayor of Ingolstadt (1972–2002).
- Gurjant Singh, 91, Indian politician, four-time Rajasthan MLA.
- Joseph Slogan, 93, Canadian politician, MP (1958–1965).
- Marcel Tassy, 91, French politician, deputy (1978–1981).
- Birutė Žilytė-Steponavičienė, 94, Lithuanian graphic artist, book illustrator, and painter.

=== 4 ===
- Kristian Antila, 44, Finnish ice hockey player (Ilves, Porin Ässät, Luleå HF).
- Mamadou Moustapha Ba, 59, Senegalese politician, minister of economy and finance (2022–2024).
- Barbara T. Bowman, 96, American education activist, heart failure.
- Jonathan Brostoff, 41, American politician, member of the Wisconsin State Assembly (2015–2022) and Milwaukee Common Council (since 2022), suicide.
- Daniel Ceppi, 73, Swiss comics artist.
- Gary Cormack, 74, Canadian wheelchair curler, Paralympic champion (2006).
- Sarah Cunningham, 31, British painter. (body discovered on this date)
- Janet Douglas, 81, English historian.
- Sir Christopher Drewry, 77, British military officer, commander of ARRC (2000–2002), cancer.
- Charlie Evans, 76, American football player (New York Giants, Washington Redskins).
- Don Ferrarese, 95, American baseball player (Baltimore Orioles, Cleveland Indians, Philadelphia Phillies).
- Kiki Håkansson, 95, Swedish model and beauty queen, Miss World winner (1951).
- David Hill, 76, British political adviser, Downing Street director of communications (2003–2007), pneumonia.
- Jim Hoagland, 84, American journalist (The Washington Post), Pulitzer Prize winner (1971, 1991), stroke.
- Jimmy Holley, 80, American politician, member of the Alabama House of Representatives (1974–1994) and Senate (1998–2022).
- Henryk Kocój, 93, Polish historian.
- Andrzej Krzesiński, 97, Polish Olympic athlete (1960).
- Miguel Ledo, 34, Spanish footballer (SD Logroñés), leukemia.
- Victor A. Lundy, 101, American modernist architect (Warm Mineral Springs Motel).
- Johnny Madsen, 73, Danish singer.
- Bernard Marcus, 95, American businessman, co-founder and chairman of Home Depot.
- David Maxwell, 81, American politician, member of the Iowa House of Representatives (2013–2023).
- Heorhiy Mozer, 84, Ukrainian politician, MP (1994–1998).
- Tyka Nelson, 64, American singer.
- Rudolf Nieuwenhuys, 97, Dutch neuroanatomist.
- Olivera Nikolova, 88, Macedonian author.
- William C. Norris, 98, American air force major general.
- Shirley Parks, 85, American politician.
- James Penton, 92, Canadian historian and author.
- Edward Peters, 88, American medieval historian.
- Ursula Preuhs, 93, German politician, Hamburg MP (1986–1997).
- Agnaldo Rayol, 86, Brazilian singer and actor, complications from a fall.
- Robin Renwick, Baron Renwick of Clifton, 86, British diplomat and life peer, ambassador to the United States (1991–1995), lung disease.
- Albert Schmidt, 73, German politician, MP (1994–2005).
- Renato Serio, 78, Italian composer (Alone in the Dark, The Pumaman, Innocence and Desire).
- Murray Sinclair, 73, Canadian First Nations lawyer, judge and politician, senator (2016–2021), chancellor of Queen's University (2021–2024).
- Benedykt Suchecki, 79, Polish politician, MP (2001–2005).
- Jim Webber, 84, Australian politician, mayor of the City of Rockhampton (1982–1991).
- Betty Wei, 94, Chinese-born American historian and writer.
- Kenroy Williams, 40, Barbadian cricketer (national team, Jamaica national team), cancer.

=== 5 ===
- Félicie Affolter, 98, Swiss psychologist and psychotherapist.
- Pavel Anisimov, 77, Russian politician, senator (1997–2001).
- Naresh Yadav Ateli, 61, Indian politician, Haryana MLA (2005–2009).
- Ben Baldanza, 62, American economist and airline executive (Spirit Airlines), complications from amyotrophic lateral sclerosis.
- Manjari Bhargava, 68, Indian diver, brain cancer.
- Ruby Bute, 81, Saint Martinois artist and poet.
- Marise Chamberlain, 88, New Zealand Hall of Fame middle-distance runner, Olympic bronze medalist (1964).
- Joseph R. D'Cruz, 83, Pakistani-born Canadian academic.
- Parvati Devi, 90, Indian royal and politician, MP (1977–1980).
- Eileen Diss, 93, British set designer.
- Elwood Edwards, 74, American voice actor (America Online), complications from a stroke.
- David P. Farrington, 80, British criminologist, forensic psychologist, and academic.
- Lucien Francoeur, 76, Canadian singer and poet, complications from a heart attack.
- Andrzej Hachuła, 64, Polish Olympic ice hockey player (1984).
- Ronald Jenyns, 88, Australian Olympic sailor.
- Sir Henry Keswick, 86, British businessman (Jardine Matheson).
- Taoreed Lagbaja, 56, Nigerian military officer, chief of army staff (since 2023).
- Volodymyr Matvieiev, 81, Ukrainian politician, people's deputy (1990–1994, 1998–2006, 2007–2012).
- Brendan McCann, 89, American basketball player (New York Knicks).
- Asot Michael, 54, Antiguan politician, MP (since 2004), stabbed.
- Robert H. Mohlenbrock, 93, American botanist.
- William O'Gara, 92, American politician, member of the Maine House of Representatives (1985–1997) and Senate (1997–2003).
- Evelyne de Pontbriand, 73, French winemaker, cancer.
- Nestor Rateș, 91, Romanian-American writer and journalist (Radio Free Europe).
- Jerry Reitman, 86, American author, businessman, and executive.
- Reddi Satyanarayana, 99, Indian politician, Andhra Pradesh MLA (1983–2004).
- Sharda Sinha, 72, Indian folk and classical singer.
- Dave Stephens, 95, Australian Olympic athlete (1956).
- Charlie Turner, 79, American football player (Hamilton Tiger-Cats, Edmonton Eskimos, Winnipeg Blue Bombers).
- Mick Waters, 81, Irish hurler (Blackrock, Cork).
- Sytze van der Zee, 85, Dutch writer and journalist (Het Parool), lung cancer.

=== 6 ===
- Dorothy Allison, 75, American writer (Bastard Out of Carolina), cancer.
- Johannes Beutler, 91, German theologian and priest.
- Don Bosseler, 88, American football player (Washington Redskins).
- Christopher Bruell, 81, American philosopher.
- John Cannan, 70, British convicted murderer and rapist.
- Ivan Zvonimir Čičak, 77, Croatian dissident and politician (Croatian Spring), president of the Croatian Helsinki Committee (1993–1998, since 2009).
- John Dempsey, 78, English-Irish football player (Fulham, Chelsea, Ireland national team) and manager, lung cancer.
- Wolt Fabrycky, 91, American systems engineer.
- Josep Ferrer Sala, 99, Spanish wine executive, president of Freixenet (1978–1999).
- Charles Geerts, 81, Dutch businessman and brothel owner.
- Christian Godard, 92, French cartoonist (The Vagabond of Limbo), cancer.
- Pablo León Hakimian, 70, Egyptian Armenian Catholic hierarch, eparch of San Gregorio de Narek en Buenos Aires (since 2018) and Latin America and Mexico (since 2018).
- Maximilian Heidenreich, 57, German football player (Hannover 96, SC Freiburg) and manager (Freiburger FC), bowel cancer.
- Alice Hudson, 77, American librarian and cartographic curator.
- Syed Shah Khusro Hussaini, 79, Indian scholar and educator.
- Al Jury, 83, American football official.
- Philippe Nkiere Keana, 86, Congolese Roman Catholic prelate, bishop of Bondo (1992–2005) and Inongo (2005–2018).
- Michie Kita, 89, Japanese voice actress (Dog of Flanders, King Arthur, Doraemon: Nobita and the Castle of the Undersea Devil).
- Pavel Klimenko, 47, Russian major general.
- Anna Lo, 74, Northern Irish politician, MLA (2007–2016).
- K. Malaisamy, 87, Indian politician, MP (1999–2014).
- Sir John Nott, 92, British politician, MP (1966–1983) and defence secretary (1981–1983).
- Phyllis O'Donnell, 87, Australian surfer.
- Madeleine Riffaud, 100, French Resistance member, poet, and war correspondent (L'Humanité).
- Fabio Sartor, 70, Italian actor (Phantom of Death, The Passion of the Christ, La ladra).
- Yigal Shilon, 78, Israeli television host and prankster.
- Daniel Spoerri, 94, Swiss visual artist and writer.
- Tony Todd, 69, American actor (Candyman, Platoon, Final Destination), stomach cancer.
- Vojtěch Vašíček, 68, Czech pentathlete, Paralympic champion (1992).
- Eka Vogelnik, 78, Slovene illustrator, designer, and puppeteer.
- Angus Walker, 85, Canadian musician.

=== 7 ===
- Selçuk Ayhan, 71, Turkish engineer and politician, MP (2007–2011), hyperglycemia.
- Dinanath Batra, 94, Indian educationist.
- Jürgen Becker, 92, German poet, prose writer and radio play author.
- Ben Herbstreit, 10, American assistance dog, cancer.
- Ivan Charota, 72, Belarusian literary critic, cultural historian and translator.
- Nitin Chauhaan, 35, Indian actor (Dadagiri, MTV Splitsvilla 5, Zindagi Dot Com), suicide.
- Phil Cohen, 81, British cultural theorist, urban ethnographer and writer.
- Walter Dahn, 70, German painter, photographer, and sound artist.
- Bruce Degen, 79, American illustrator (The Magic School Bus), pancreatic cancer.
- Doug Dressler, 76, American football player (Cincinnati Bengals, Kansas City Chiefs, New England Patriots).
- Louis Edward Gelineau, 96, American Roman Catholic prelate, bishop of Providence (1972–1997).
- Sir Bom Gillies, 99, New Zealand soldier, last surviving member of the Māori Battalion.
- Geneviève Grad, 80, French actress (The Troops of St. Tropez), cancer.
- John C. Hartigan, 67, American visual effects artist (Kill Bill, Hawaii Five-0, Click).
- Arent M. Henriksen, 78, Norwegian politician, MP (1973–1977, 1981–1989).
- Ana Maria Lajusticia, 100, Spanish biochemist and nutritionist.
- Sergio Los, 90, Italian architect and educator.
- Lui Che-woo, 95, Hong Kong property developer, founder of Galaxy Entertainment Group and K. Wah International.
- Joseph T. Maguire, 98, American politician, member of the Massachusetts House of Representatives (1977–1979).
- Éden Pedroso, 81, Brazilian politician, Rio Grande do Sul MLA (1987–1991), deputy (1991–1995).
- John Phiri, 75, Zambian politician.
- Cédric Plançon, 55, French Olympic weightlifter (1992, 1996).
- James Rawson, 59, British table tennis player, Paralympic champion (1992). (death announced on this date)
- Jacques Renoir, 81, French photographer and cinematographer.
- Scorpio Jr., 58, Mexican professional wrestler (CMLL).
- Pim Sierks, 92, Dutch airline pilot (1974 French Embassy attack in The Hague).
- Shreegopal Vyas, 92, Indian politician, MP (2006–2012).
- Kathleen Watkins, 90, Irish broadcaster, actress (Insurrection), and harpist.

=== 8 ===
- Asbjørn Agerschou, 76, Danish seminary teacher and politician, MP (1981–1990).
- Jesús Ares, 90, Spanish footballer (Langreo, Salamanca, Celta Vigo).
- A. Cornelius Baker, 63, American HIV/AIDS activist, atherosclerosis.
- Betty Bausch-Polak, 105, Dutch Holocaust survivor.
- Musafir Ram Bhardwaj, 94, Indian musician.
- George Bohanon, 87, American jazz trombonist.
- Jack Boul, 97, American artist and teacher.
- W. B. Brydon, 94, British-American actor (The Age of Innocence, Trading Places, The Mask).
- James Buskey, 87, American politician, member of the Alabama House of Representatives (1976–2018).
- Farid Chenoune, 75, French fashion historian and sociologist, cancer.
- Stanisław Chiliński, 68, Polish Olympic wrestler (1980).
- Margaree Seawright Crosby, 82, American civil rights activist and academic.
- Michael Eitan, 80, Israeli politician, MK (1984–2013), minister of science (1997–1998) and government service (2009–2013).
- Aud Voss Eriksen, 87, Norwegian politician, deputy member of the Storting (1981–1993).
- Kazimierz Ferenc, 80, Polish architect and politician, voivode of Rzeszów (1990–1994).
- Fernando Fragata, 58, Portuguese film director (Backlight, Sorte Nula).
- Eugen Gerritz, 89, German politician, member of the Landtag of North Rhine-Westphalia (1980–1995).
- José Botafogo Gonçalves, 89, Brazilian lawyer, diplomat, and politician, minister of industry, commerce and tourism (1998–1999), respiratory failure.
- Charles Herring, 79, American politician, member of the Louisiana House of Representatives (1988–1992).
- Roz Hervey, 58, Australian dancer and choreographer, assisted suicide.
- Harald Holz, 94, German philosopher, theologian, and mathematician.
- Rumen Ivanov, 51, Bulgarian footballer (Etar V. Tarnovo, Botev Plovdiv, Aarau), heart attack.
- Gabriel Kney, 94, Canadian pipe organ builder.
- Marty Kuehnert, 78, American baseball executive (Tohoku Rakuten Golden Eagles).
- Billy Lawless, 73, Irish politician and businessman, senator (2016–2020).
- George Lehmann, 83, American basketball player (St. Louis/Atlanta Hawks, New York Nets).
- Peter Loukianoff, 76, American Russian Orthodox prelate.
- Rachid Mekhloufi, 88, Algerian football player (Saint-Étienne, France national team) and manager (national team).
- Helle Meri, 75, Estonian actress and socialite, first lady (1992–2001).
- Elizabeth Nunez, 80, American novelist (Anna In-Between), stroke.
- Titinga Frédéric Pacéré, 80, Burkinabé solicitor, writer, and poet.
- Jerry M. Patterson, 90, American politician, member of the U.S. House of Representatives (1975–1985).
- K. Selvaraj, 66, Indian politician, member of the Tamil Nadu Legislative Assembly (1991–1996), cardiac arrest.
- George E. Smith, 86, American philosopher, cancer.
- Trevor Sorbie, 75, British celebrity hairdresser, bowel cancer.
- June Spencer, 105, English actress (The Archers).
- Virginia Stroud, 73, American Cherokee painter.
- Arthur R. Thompson, 85–86, American activist, CEO of the John Birch Society (2005–2020). (death announced on this date)
- Brian Wheeler, 62, American basketball announcer (Portland Trail Blazers).

=== 9 ===
- Hassan Akesbi, 89, Moroccan footballer (Nîmes, Reims, national team).
- Bobby Allison, 86, American Hall of Fame racing driver, NASCAR Cup Series champion (1983) and three-time Daytona 500 winner.
- Morihisa Aoki, 85, Japanese diplomat, ambassador to Peru (1994–1997).
- Masao Arai, 75, Japanese wrestler, Olympic bronze medallist (1976).
- Salim Ayyash, 61, Lebanese Hezbollah militant, airstrike.
- Yiannis Boutaris, 82, Greek winemaker and politician, mayor of Thessaloniki (2011–2019).
- Arturo Carsetti, 84, Italian philosopher of science.
- Lou Donaldson, 98, American jazz saxophonist, pneumonia.
- Patricia H. Foss, 98, American politician, member of the New Hampshire House of Representatives (1984–1992).
- Edith Franke, 82, German politician, member of the Landtag of Saxony (2009–2014).
- Felice D. Gaer, 78, American human rights activist, metastatic breast cancer.
- Delhi Ganesh, 80, Indian actor (Kaatru Veliyidai, Muni, Pattina Pravesam).
- José Garrido, 64, Portuguese football player (Benfica, Boavista) and manager (Al-Nasr).
- Frank Hartmann, 75, German Olympic wrestler.
- Judith Jamison, 81, American dancer and choreographer.
- Ella Jenkins, 100, American singer-songwriter.
- James Patrick Keleher, 93, American Roman Catholic prelate, bishop of Belleville (1984–1993) and archbishop of Kansas City (1993–2005).
- Anil Kumar, 83, Indian physicist.
- Lee Shi-yoon, 89, South Korean lawyer and judge, justice of the Constitutional Court (1988–1993).
- Pedro Machete, 59, Portuguese judge, justice (2012–2023) and vice-president (2021–2023) of the Constitutional Court, cancer.
- Viesturs Meijers, 56, Latvian chess grandmaster.
- J. Reginald Murphy, 90, American business executive and journalist (The Atlanta Constitution, The Baltimore Sun).
- Ram Narayan, 96, Indian sarangi player.
- Valeria Narbikova, 66, Russian writer.
- Günter Rixe, 85, German politician, MP (1987–1998).
- Rudolf Trauner Jr., 70, Austrian businessman and politician, member of the Landtag of Upper Austria (1991–1997).
- Jean-Marie Untaani Compaoré, 91, Burkinabè Roman Catholic prelate, auxiliary bishop of Ouagadougou (1973–1979), bishop of Fada N'Gourma (1979–1995) and archbishop of Ouagadougou (1995–2009).
- Vyacheslav Uzelkov, 45, Ukrainian heavyweight boxer.
- George Wilkins, 90, American composer.

=== 10 ===
- Mohammad Ibrahim Abu Senna, 87, Egyptian poet.
- Barbara Aland, 87, German theologian.
- Rex Blundell, 82, Australian cricketer (South Australia).
- Charles A. Burney, 94, British archaeologist.
- Paul Caponigro, 91, American photographer, heart failure.
- Mary Pat Clarke, 83, American politician, member of the Baltimore City Council (1975–1983, 2004–2020).
- Tim Crow, 86, British psychiatrist and researcher, complications from Parkinson's disease.
- Inés Fernández Moreno, 77, Argentine novelist.
- Sandra Gilbert, 87, American literary critic (The Madwoman in the Attic) and poet, chronic obstructive pulmonary disease.
- Derrick Grant, 86, Scottish rugby union player (Hawick, national team).
- James W. Harris, 92, American linguist and professor.
- Michael Hogan, 56, Irish hurler (Birr, Offaly).
- Sir Maurice Johnston, 95, British army officer.
- Pepe Justicia, 64, Spanish flamenco guitarist.
- Dick Kercher, 92, American football player (Detroit Lions).
- John Kimble, 79, American talent manager.
- Karl Koepfer, 90, American football player (Detroit Lions).
- Walfrid Kujala, 99, American flutist.
- John LaBarge, 72, American politician, member of the Vermont House of Representatives (1993–2003).
- Abdelkader Lecheheb, 70, Moroccan diplomat and footballer (USM d'Oujda, MC Oujda, national team), ambassador to Russia (2008–2019).
- Dallas Long, 84, American shot putter, Olympic champion (1964), complications from Parkinson's disease.
- João Omar Macagnan, 81, Brazilian politician, Santa Catarina MLA (1987–1988, 1999–2003), mayor of Itajaí (1989–1992).
- Anthony J. Marsella, 84, American author and academic.
- Mahendra Singh Mewar, 83, Indian politician, MP (1989–1991).
- Arnold Oss, 96, American ice hockey player, Olympic silver medalist (1952).
- Henry Pedersen Jr., 94, American politician.
- Peng Chenliang, 30, Chinese soldier, shot. (death announced on this date)
- Helmut Pflugradt, 75, German politician, member of the Bürgerschaft of Bremen (1975–2009).
- William Radice, 73, British poet, writer, and translator, cancer.
- Stanley Rensch, 84, Surinamese Maroon and human rights activist, denounced the Moiwana massacre.
- Gary Smyth, 60, Northern Irish loyalist paramilitary, heart attack.
- Indra Soundar Rajan, 65, Indian author.
- Tim Sullivan, 76, American science fiction author, heart failure.
- Michel Sy, 94, French politician, deputy (1960–1962).
- Noel Tierney, 82, Irish Gaelic footballer (Galway).
- Xu Chao, 30, Chinese Olympic racing cyclist (2016, 2020).

=== 11 ===
- Marco Angulo, 22, Ecuadorian footballer (LDU Quito, Independiente del Valle, national team), injuries sustained in a traffic collision.
- Frank Auerbach, 93, German-British painter.
- Ray Baxter, 84, Australian footballer (Footscray).
- Marie Benešová, 76, Czech politician and lawyer, minister of justice (2013–2014, 2019–2021).
- Bruce Boston, 81, American author.
- Harvey Burnett, 29, Scottish rugby league player (London Broncos, Oxford Rugby League, national team), cancer.
- René Djian, 97, French Olympic middle-distance runner (1952, 1956).
- Gerry Faust, 89, American football coach (Notre Dame Fighting Irish, Akron Zips).
- Gloria Fox, 82, American politician, member of the Massachusetts House of Representatives (1987–2017).
- Ubayd Haider, 25, Fijian boxer, brain haemorrhage.
- Richard D. James, 88, American production designer (Star Trek) and art director (Local Hero, Silkwood), complications from an infection.
- R. Sharath Jois, 53, Indian yoga instructor, heart attack.
- Jan Kiedrowicz, 64, Polish chess grandmaster.
- Clay Foster Lee Jr., 94, American Methodist bishop.
- Sir Peter Mason, 78, British businessman, chairman of Thames Water (2006–2017).
- Papa Noël Nedule, 83, Congolese guitarist.
- Manfred Niekisch, 73, German biologist.
- Kenneth Oliver, 79, American politician, member of Baltimore County Council (2002–2014).
- John Peaslee, 73, American television writer and producer (Coach, According to Jim, Liv and Maddie).
- Ivica Rajković, 89, Croatian cinematographer.
- Gillian Riley, 80, English food writer and historian.
- John Robinson, 89, American football coach (USC Trojans, Los Angeles Rams), pneumonia.
- Dmitry Sukharev, 94, Russian biologist, poet, and bard.
- Coşkun Taş, 89, Turkish footballer (Beşiktaş, 1. FC Köln, national team).
- Carolina Valdivia, 46, Chilean politician, minister of foreign affairs (2022), pancreatic cancer.

=== 12 ===
- Naoyuki Agawa, 73, Japanese academic and attorney.
- Bendiks H. Arnesen, 73, Norwegian politician, MP (1997–2013).
- Gift Atulewa, 38, Nigerian footballer (Bayelsa United, Ocean Boys, Warri Wolves), heart failure.
- Saïd Ben Mustapha, 86, Tunisian politician and diplomat, minister of foreign affairs (1997–1999).
- Bronislaw Bernacki, 80, Ukrainian Roman Catholic prelate, bishop of Odesa-Simferopol (2002–2020).
- Ani Bitenc, 90, Slovene translator.
- Agnes Buen Garnås, 78, Norwegian singer.
- Joanne Chory, 69, American plant biologist and geneticist, complications from Parkinson's disease.
- Dana Devine, American-born Canadian immunologist.
- Johnny Duhan, 74, Irish singer-songwriter ("The Voyage"), drowned.
- Michalis Ganas, 80, Greek poet.
- Barrie Gavin, 89, British film and television director.
- Roy Haynes, 99, American jazz drummer.
- John Horgan, 65, Canadian politician and diplomat, premier of British Columbia (2017–2022) and ambassador to Germany (since 2023), thyroid cancer.
- Michael Hübner, 65, German sprint track cyclist, six-time world champion.
- Morgan Jenness, 72, American freelance dramaturg.
- Fred Kessler, 84, American politician and judge, member of the Wisconsin State Assembly (1961–1972, 2005–2019), cancer.
- Kitanofuji Katsuaki, 82, Japanese sumo wrestler.
- Helmut Koch, 92, German mathematician.
- Helen Kleinbort Krauze, 99, Polish-born Mexican journalist (Novedades de México).
- Radivoje Krivokapić, 71, Serbian handball player (1976 Olympics, RK Partizan, Yugoslavia national team), heart attack.
- Thomas E. Kurtz, 96, American mathematician and computer scientist, co-developer of the BASIC programming language, sepsis.
- Liang Guanglie, 83, Chinese army general and politician, minister of national defense (2008–2013) and head of the Joint Staff Department (2002–2007).
- Robert Lowery, 87, British Olympic sprint canoer.
- Bent Mejding, 87, Danish actor (Matador, We Shall Overcome, 1864), pneumonia.
- Eddie Millar, 86, Australian rules footballer (Collingwood).
- Manoj Mitra, 85, Indian actor (Banchharamer Bagaan, Ghare Baire, Ganashatru), director, and playwright.
- Camay Calloway Murphy, 97, American educator.
- Jean Nallit, 101, French Resistance member.
- Billy Newsome, 76, American football player (Baltimore Colts, New Orleans Saints, New York Jets).
- Helmut Nonn, 91, German Olympic field hockey player (1956, 1960).
- Kalambay Otepa, 76, Congolese footballer (TP Mazembe, Zaire national team).
- M. T. Padma, 81, Indian politician, Kerala MLA (1987–1991).
- Silviu Prigoană, 60, Romanian businessman and politician, deputy (2008–2012), heart attack.
- Erwin David Rabhan, 98, American businessman.
- Mohammad Ali Salamat, 43, Iranian alleged rapist, executed.
- Song Jae-rim, 39, South Korean actor (The Idle Mermaid, Our Gap-soon, Goodbye Mr. Black) and model, suicide.
- Giorgos Valavanidis, 50, Greek basketball player (PAOK, M.E.N.T.), heart attack.
- Vardis Vardinogiannis, 90, Greek shipping and oil executive, chairman of Motor Oil Hellas and Vegas Oil and Gas.
- Timothy West, 90, English actor (Hedda, EastEnders) and television presenter (Great Canal Journeys).
- Shreenarayan Yadav, 88–89, Indian politician, Bihar MLA (1977–2020).
- Eiji Yanagisawa, 57, Japanese voice actor (Baki the Grappler, Code Geass, Digimon Frontier), intracerebral hemorrhage.
- Lindsay Yeo, 78, New Zealand radio broadcaster (2ZB).
- František Zvardoň, 75, Czech writer and photographer.

=== 13 ===
- Teodoro Buhain, 87, Filipino Roman Catholic prelate, auxiliary bishop of Manila (1983–2003).
- Michał Dąbrowski, 38, Polish fencer, Paralympic silver and bronze medalist (2024), bile duct cancer.
- Daim Zainuddin, 86, Malaysian politician, minister of finance (1984–1991, 1999–2001), MP (1982–2004).
- Ricky Dandan, 62, Filipino basketball coach (UP Fighting Maroons, Columbian Dyip), renal cancer.
- Trond Eliassen, 102, Norwegian architect (Norwegian Maritime Museum).
- J. Cheryl Exum, 78, American feminist biblical scholar.
- Franco Ferrarotti, 98, Italian sociologist and politician, deputy (1959–1963).
- Raj Gauthaman, 74, Indian literary scholar.
- Ken Gill, 76, English rugby league player (Salford Red Devils, national team).
- John Hambrick, 79, American politician, member of the Nevada Assembly (2008–2020), cancer.
- Bobby Harris, 83, American politician, member of the Georgia House of Representatives (1985–1995).
- Dan Hennessey, 82, Canadian voice actor (Care Bears, Inspector Gadget, X-Men: The Animated Series), complications from Parkinson's disease.
- John Indi, 70, Zimbabwean actor (Mandela, Incident at Victoria Falls).
- Junaedi, 57, Indonesian bureaucrat, regent of Thousand Islands (since 2020).
- Begum Rosy Kabir, 73, Bangladeshi politician, MP (2005–2006), liver disease.
- Hashem Kolahi, 68, Iranian Olympic wrestler (1976).
- Miodrag Kostić, 65, Serbian businessman, founder of MK Group.
- Spencer Lawton, 81, American district attorney, heart disease.
- Doireann MacDermott, 100, Irish translator, writer and academic.
- John Skeffington, 14th Viscount Massereene, 84, British peer, member of the House of Lords (1992–1999), sepsis and pneumonia.
- Brian Maxine, 86, English wrestler and cabaret artist, British welterweight (1969–1971) and middleweight champion (1971).
- Adolfo Moran, 70–71, Spanish architect.
- Rampilla Narasayamma, 99, Indian freedom fighter.
- Theodore Olson, 84, American lawyer, U.S. solicitor general (2001–2004), stroke.
- Paul Peters, 82, Dutch politician, senator (2007–2011).
- Kianush Sanjari, 42, Iranian journalist and activist (VOA-PNN, IHRDC, IHR), suicide.
- Ken Shorter, 74, Australian actor (Stone, You Can't See 'round Corners, Dragonslayer).
- Luis Soares, 60, Portuguese-French Olympic long-distance runner (1992).
- Paul Staes, 78, Belgian politician, MEP (1984–1994), senator (1995–1999).
- Shel Talmy, 87, American record producer ("You Really Got Me", "My Generation", "Friday on My Mind"), complications from a stroke.
- Shuntarō Tanikawa, 92, Japanese poet and translator.
- Luis Ernesto Tapia, 80, Panamanian footballer (Alianza, national team), heart attack.
- Samuelu Teo, 66, Tuvaluan politician, acting governor-general (2021), MP (1998–2006, 2015–2024).
- Elizabeth Kridl Valkenier, 98, Polish-American art historian.
- Wes Wessberg, 85, American Olympic cyclist.
- Alexei Zimin, 52, Russian chef, television presenter, and restaurateur.

=== 14 ===
- Jacques Adélaïde-Merlande, 91, French historian.
- Tommy Alverson, 74, American country singer-songwriter, liver cancer.
- Greg Bialecki, 64, American attorney.
- Vadim Brovtsev, 55, Russian businessman and politician, prime minister (2009–2012) and acting president of South Ossetia (2011–2012), heart attack.
- Dennis Bryon, 75, Welsh drummer (Amen Corner, Bee Gees).
- Harischandra Chavan, 72, Indian politician, member of the Maharashtra Legislative Assembly (1995–1999) and of the Lok Sabha (2004–2019).
- Dervilla M. X. Donnelly, 94, Irish chemist and academic.
- Michel Elkoubi, 77, French racing driver. (death announced on this date)
- Vic Flick, 87, English studio guitarist ("James Bond Theme"), complications from Alzheimer's disease.
- Keith Hepworth, 82, English rugby league player (Castleford, Leeds, Hull F.C.) and coach.
- Shōhei Hino, 75, Japanese actor (Eijanaika, The Boy and the Heron, Emperor) and singer.
- John Hodges, 87, Australian politician, MP (1974–1983, 1984–1987), minister of immigration and ethnic affairs (1982–1983).
- Aashish Khan, 84, Indian classical musician.
- William J. Lavery, 86, American politician and jurist, member of the Connecticut House of Representatives (1967–1971), judge of the Connecticut Appellate Court (1989–2007).
- Max Freitas Mauro, 87, Brazilian doctor and politician, deputy (1979–1987, 1999–2003), governor of Espírito Santo (1987–1991).
- Alberto Monaci, 83, Italian politician, deputy (1987–1992).
- Matti Päts, 91, Estonian civil servant and politician, MP (1992–1995).
- Peter Sinfield, 80, English lyricist ("21st Century Schizoid Man", "I Believe in Father Christmas"), musician (King Crimson), and record producer.
- Frances Strong, 93, American politician, member of the Alabama Senate (1983–1986).
- Andrzej Sykta, 84, Polish footballer (Wisła Kraków, Motor Lublin, national team).
- Pavel Traubner, 83, Slovak neurologist.
- Igor Volke, 74, Estonian ufologist.
- Saburo Yokomizo, 84, Japanese Olympic middle-distance runner (1964), liver cancer.
- Kadyr Yusupov, 72, Uzbek diplomat.

=== 15 ===
- Salwa Abu Khadra, 95, Palestinian politician.
- Ahmed Mohamed Mohamoud, 86, Somaliland politician, president (2010–2017), minister of finance (1997–1999) and MP (1993–1996).
- Graham Bailey, 104, English footballer (Huddersfield Town, Sheffield United).
- Frank Bentley, 90, English Anglican clergyman, archdeacon of Worcester (1984–1999), heart failure.
- Helen Ginger Berrigan, 76, American jurist, judge (since 1994) and chief judge (2001–2008) of the U.S. District Court for Eastern Louisiana.
- Trygve Bornø, 82, Norwegian football player (Skeid, national team) and official, secretary general of the Norwegian Football Federation (1983–1985, 1996–1999).
- Celeste Caeiro, 91, Portuguese pacifist (Carnation Revolution), respiratory failure.
- Don Carter, 88, Canadian ice hockey player (Greensboro Generals).
- Robert Cohen, 86, American playwright.
- Robert Dixon, 103, American World War II veteran, last surviving Buffalo Soldier.
- Elvstroem, 24, Australian Thoroughbred racehorse.
- Al Ferrara, 84, American baseball player (Los Angeles Dodgers, San Diego Padres, Cincinnati Reds), pneumonia.
- Tom Forrestall, 88, Canadian realist painter.
- Ibrahim Saad, 78, Malaysian politician, MP (1995–1999).
- Romualds Kalsons, 88, Latvian composer.
- Béla Károlyi, 82, Hungarian-American Hall of Fame gymnastics coach.
- Jon Kenny, 66, Irish comedian and actor (The Banshees of Inisherin, Les Misérables, Father Ted), heart attack.
- Eileen Kramer, 110, Australian dancer and choreographer.
- John T. Mickel, 90, American botanist.
- István Nemere, 80, Hungarian novelist, heart attack.
- Richard Mulgan, 84, New Zealand political scientist.
- Sir Robin Nicholson, 90, British metallurgist, chief scientific adviser (1982–1985).
- Michael Osei, 53, Ghanaian football player (Asante Kotoko, national team) and manager (Bibiani Gold Stars).
- Dick Packer, 90, American soccer player (Uhrik Truckers, 1956 Olympics).
- Pausi Jefridin, 49, Malaysian drug trafficker, hanged.
- Roslan Bakar, 53, Singaporean drug trafficker, hanged.
- Suresh Sangaiah, Indian filmmaker (Oru Kidayin Karunai Manu, Sathiya Sothanai), liver failure.
- Frank Schäffer, 72, German footballer (Borussia Mönchengladbach, SpVgg Ludwigsburg).
- Sönke Sönksen, 86, German equestrian, Olympic silver medalist (1976).
- Paul Teal, 35, American actor (One Tree Hill, Deep Water, The Staircase), cancer.
- Patricia Thomson, 86, Australian cricket player (national team). (death announced on this date)
- Yuriko, Princess Mikasa, 101, Japanese royal, stroke and pneumonia.
- Ugo Zorco, 86, Italian Olympic field hockey player (1960).

=== 16 ===
- Richard V. Allen, 88, American public servant, national security advisor (1981–1982).
- Tommy Andersson, 60, Swedish footballer (Halmstad).
- S. Atan, 75, Singaporean-born Malaysian music composer.
- Ilyas Ahmed Bilour, 84, Pakistani politician, senator (2012–2018), kidney disease.
- Cathy Cade, 82, American photographer.
- Penny Chuter, 82, British rower.
- Coloso Colosetti, 76, Argentine professional wrestler (NWA, CMLL).
- Peter Cowley, 69, British businessman, cancer.
- William S. Crismore, 91, American politician, member of the Montana Senate (1995–2003).
- Dejan Despić, 94, Serbian classical composer, author, and music theoretician.
- Mikhail Eremets, 75, Belarusian physicist and chemist.
- Mohammad Fazlul Karim, 81, Bangladeshi jurist, chief justice (2010).
- Edward J. FitzSimons, 84, American politician and attorney, mayor of Mettawa, Illinois (1981–1991).
- Sergey Govorushko, 69, Russian geographer.
- Esther Haywood, 84, American politician, member of the Missouri House of Representatives (2001–2009).
- John Hine, 86, British Roman Catholic prelate, auxiliary bishop of Southwark (2001–2016).
- Denise Holstein, 97, French author.
- Howard Hughes, British podcaster, radio presenter and journalist (BBC Radio Berkshire, Capital London). (death announced on this date)
- Hamid Merakchi, 48, Algerian footballer (Gençlerbirliği, MC Alger, national team).
- Robert M. Miller, 97, American equine behaviorist and veterinarian.
- Nara Ramamurthy Naidu, 72, Indian politician, Andhra Pradesh MLA (1994–1999).
- Vladlen Naumenko, 77, Ukrainian footballer (FC Avanhard Ternopil, FC Sudnobudivnyk Mykolaiv) and coach (MFC Mykolaiv).
- Hans Nilsson, 83, Swedish footballer (Djurgården, national team).
- Zhenis Nurgaliyev, 62, Kazakh agronomist and politician, senator (2010–2023).
- Eunice Parsons, 108, American modernist artist.
- Jiří Pospíšil, 75, Czech politician and psychologist, senator (1996–2012).
- Frank Robson, 78, English-born Finnish singer.
- Jay David Saks, 79, American music producer.
- Jerome Sattler, 93, American clinical psychologist.
- Vladimir Shklyarov, 39, Russian ballet dancer, fall.
- Sir Lady Java, 82, American drag performer and transgender rights activist.
- Svetlana Svetlichnaya, 84, Russian actress (The Diamond Arm, Anna Pavlova, Goddess: How I fell in Love).
- Pat Koch Thaler, 92, American educator, assisted suicide.
- Olav Thon, 101, Norwegian businessman and philanthropist.
- Joseph Tsang Mang Kin, 86, Mauritian poet, political scientist, and biographer.
- Javier de Villota, 82, Spanish painter.
- Gerry Weil, 85, Austrian-born Venezuelan jazz musician.
- Clifton R. Wharton Jr., 98, American academic and diplomat, deputy secretary of state (1993), cancer.
- David Yaffe, 51, American academic and music critic.

=== 17 ===
- Mohammad Afif, 64–65, Lebanese Hezbollah spokesperson, airstrike.
- Khaled Ahmed, 81, Pakistani journalist.
- Paulo Alexandre, 93, Portuguese singer.
- Honorio Bórquez, 77, Chilean Olympic boxer (1968).
- Alan Castell, 81, English cricketer.
- Bernard Chiarelli, 90, French footballer (Valenciennes, Lille, national team).
- Choi Jae-uk, 84, South Korean politician, MP (1988–1996), minister of environment (1998–1999).
- Muazzez İlmiye Çığ, 110, Turkish archaeologist.
- Sharon Colyear, 69, British Olympic sprinter and hurdler (1984).
- Wesley Cox, 69, American basketball player (Golden State Warriors).
- Daman Nath Dhungana, 83, Nepali politician, speaker of the House of Representatives (1991–1994).
- Jeff Dozier, 80, American snow hydrologist and environmental scientist.
- Gerhard Dünnhaupt, 97, German bibliographer, literary historian and professor.
- John Ray Godfrey, 80, American basketball player (Abilene Christian Wildcats).
- Joachim Griese, 72, German sailor, Olympic silver medallist (1984).
- Münci Kalayoğlu, 84, Turkish surgeon.
- S. M. Khan, 67, Indian Information Service officer.
- Jim Knaub, 68, American wheelchair marathon athlete and actor (The Man Who Loved Women), five-time Boston Marathon winner.
- Eugeniusz Kubiak, 85, Polish Olympic rower (1964).
- Vladimir Lyovkin, 57, Russian singer (Na Na).
- Dmytro Maslovskyi, 30, Ukrainian soldier, killed.
- Charles Mullins, 92, American pediatric cardiologist.
- Ehrhart Neubert, 84, German Evangelical priest and theologian.
- Oh Hee-ok, 98, South Korean independence activist.
- Vincenzo Perrone, 87, Italian entrepreneur and politician, deputy (1992–1994).
- Orestes Rodríguez Vargas, 81, Peruvian chess grandmaster.
- Viktor Samsonov, 83, Russian military officer, chief of the general staff (1996–1997).
- Siaka Toumani Sangaré, 69, Malian civil servant and politician, president of the Independent National Electoral Commission of Guinea (2010–2011).
- Artur Sarnat, 54, Polish footballer (Wisła Kraków, KSZO Ostrowiec Świętokrzyski, Kmita Zabierzów).
- Allan Svensson, 73, Swedish actor (Svensson, Svensson, Vänner och fiender, Gåsmamman), prostate cancer.
- Macoto Takahashi, 90, Japanese manga artist and painter, esophageal cancer.
- Hugo Villaverde, 70, Argentine footballer (Colón de Santa Fe, Independiente, national team).
- John Waiko, 79, Papua New Guinean historian, anthropologist, playwright, and politician.
- Eric Wilkins, 67, American baseball player (Cleveland Indians).

=== 18 ===
- Ken Battle, 77, Canadian social policy analyst.
- Jordi Bonell, 66, Spanish jazz guitarist.
- Fernando Carbone Campoverde, 65, Peruvian physician and politician, minister of health (2002–2003).
- John Cartwright, 90, British politician, MP (1974–1992).
- George Coulouris, 87, British computer scientist.
- Uma Dasgupta, 84, Indian actress (Pather Panchali).
- Michel Debout, 79, French doctor and politician, member of the Regional Council of Rhône-Alpes (1986–1998).
- Samir Dey, 67, Indian politician, Odisha MLA (1995–2009), kidney infection and pneumonia.
- Charles Dumont, 95, French singer and songwriter ("Non, je ne regrette rien").
- Mike C. Frietze Jr., 97, American politician, member of the New Mexico House of Representatives (1965).
- Arthur Frommer, 95, American travel writer, founder of Frommer's, pneumonia.
- Vinod Gowda, 45, Indian Maoist insurgent, shot.
- Junko Hori, 89, Japanese voice actress (Obake no Q-Tarō, Ninja Hattori-kun, Chimpui).
- Emile Jansen, 64, Dutch actor (Winter in Wartime).
- Jan Keizer, 84, Dutch football referee.
- Karl Kohn, 98, Austrian-born American composer, teacher and pianist.
- Amar Kudin, 32, Croatian-born Italian rugby union player (Fiamme Oro Rugby, Benetton Rugby, Rugby San Donà), traffic collision.
- Bob Love, 81, American basketball player (Chicago Bulls), cancer.
- Giridhar Malaviya, 88, Indian jurist and academic administrator, judge of the Allahabad High Court (1988–2001) and chancellor of Banaras Hindu University (since 2018).
- Roy Megarry, 87, Northern Irish-born Canadian businessman and newspaper publisher (The Globe and Mail).
- Manfred Ohrenstein, 99, German-born American lawyer and politician, member of the New York State Senate (1961–1994).
- Tarmo Oja, 89, Estonian-born Swedish astronomer.
- György Pauk, 88, Hungarian violinist, complications from a fall.
- José Miguel Pérez García, 67, Spanish academic and politician, member of the Canarian Parliament (2011–2015), cancer.
- Colin Petersen, 78, Australian drummer (Bee Gees, Humpy Bong) and actor (Smiley).
- Nancy Petry, 93, Canadian artist.
- Zakaria Pintoo, 81, Bangladeshi football player (Mohammedan SC, Pakistan national team, Bangladesh national team) and manager, multiple organ failure.
- ʻAna Taufeʻulungaki, 78, Tongan politician, member of the Privy Council of Tonga (since 2022).
- Mark Wildman, 88, English snooker and billiards player and commentator, WPBSA World Champion (1984).

=== 19 ===
- Odile Bailleux, 84, French harpsichordist and organist.
- Patty Berg, 82, American politician, member of the California State Assembly (2002–2008).
- Beyza Bilgin, 89, Turkish theologian.
- Joe Birrell, 94, British Olympic hurdler (1948).
- Cesare Bonizzi, 78, Italian Capuchin friar and heavy metal singer.
- Tony Campolo, 89, American sociologist and Baptist minister, heart failure.
- Chang Si-liang, 83, Taiwanese police officer, director-general of the National Police Agency (2003–2004).
- Colin Chilvers, 79, English music video director ("Smooth Criminal") and special effects coordinator (Superman, X-Men).
- Roy Christian, 81, New Zealand rugby league player (Auckland, national team) and church minister.
- Don Cowan, 93, English footballer (Darlington).
- Bernadette Després, 83, French illustrator.
- András Fricsay, 82, German actor (The Conquest of the Citadel, The Aggression, Spider's Web) and director.
- Tetsurō Fujiwara, 93, Japanese physician.
- Diva Gray, 72, American singer (Change, Chic).
- Walter Korpi, 90, Swedish sociologist.
- Lucas Moripe, 71, South African footballer (Pretoria Callies, Caroline Hill, Orlando Pirates).
- Dirk Nuyts, 72, Belgian politician, mayor of Schilde (1995–2000).
- Ron O'Brien, 86, American diving coach and author.
- Donato Paduano, 75, Italian-born Canadian Olympic boxer (1968), complications from diabetes.
- Ken Reid, 69, Northern Irish journalist and political editor (UTV).
- Henk van Rooy, 76, Dutch footballer (Den Bosch, Roda JC Kerkrade, NAC Breda), complications from Alzheimer's disease.
- Saafir, 54, American rapper and actor (Menace II Society).
- Vojo Stanić, 100, Montenegrin painter and sculptor.
- Graciela Susana, 71, Argentine tango singer.

=== 20 ===
- José Luis Azcona Hermoso, 84, Spanish-born Brazilian Roman Catholic prelate, bishop of Marajó (1987–2016).
- Celeste Barker, 64, South African politician, member of the Eastern Cape Provincial Legislature (2014–2019).
- Ita Beausang, 88, Irish musicologist.
- John Bernard, 87, Dutch meteorologist.
- Marshall Brain, 63, American author (Manna), public speaker and entrepreneur, creator of HowStuffWorks.
- Jean-Noël Carpentier, 54, French politician, deputy (2012–2017), lung cancer.
- William Deal, 87, American politician, member of the Idaho House of Representatives (1991–2007).
- John Faria, 87, American politician, member of the Rhode Island Senate (1971–1973).
- Don Fuell, 85, American gridiron football player (Toronto Argonauts, Montreal Alouettes).
- Rino Hansen, 54, Norwegian footballer (Moss, Fredrikstad), cancer.
- Tommy Hart, 80, American football player (San Francisco 49ers, Chicago Bears, New Orleans Saints).
- Ursula Haverbeck, 96, German neo-Nazi and convicted Holocaust denier.
- J. Lawrence Irving, 89, American jurist, judge of U.S. District Court for Southern California (1982–1990).
- Aída Judith León, 96, Ecuadorian politician, first lady (1972–1976).
- Peter A. Loeb, 87, American mathematician.
- Peter Maddocks, 96, English cartoonist (The Family-Ness, Penny Crayon, Jimbo and the Jet-Set).
- Malkhaz Makharadze, 61, Georgian footballer (Dinamo Tbilisi, Guria, Dinamo Batumi).
- Manousos Manousakis, 74, Greek film director (Cloudy Sunday), producer, and writer.
- Ken McCulloch, 76, British hotelier, founder of the Malmaison and Dakota hotel chains.
- Al McLean, 87, Canadian politician, member (1981–1999) and speaker (1995–1996) of the Legislative Assembly of Ontario.
- Sir Kit McMahon, 97, Australian-born British banker, deputy governor of the Bank of England (1980–1986).
- Flaviano Melo, 75, Brazilian civil engineer and politician, governor of Acre (1987–1990), senator (1991–1999), deputy (2007–2023), pneumonia.
- Rasoul Mirmalek, 86, Iranian Olympic wrestler (1964).
- Dahir Mohammed, 51, Ethiopian-born American soccer player (Long Island Rough Riders).
- Andy Paley, 72, American musician (The Paley Brothers, The Modern Lovers), record producer, and composer (SpongeBob SquarePants), throat cancer.
- Mike Pinera, 76, American guitarist (Blues Image, Iron Butterfly) and songwriter ("Ride Captain Ride"), liver failure.
- Chad Posthumus, 33, Canadian basketball player (Winnipeg Sea Bears), brain aneurysm.
- John Prescott, Baron Prescott, 86, British politician, deputy prime minister (1997–2007), MP (1970–2010), and member of the House of Lords (2010–2024), complications from Alzheimer's disease.
- V. T. Rajshekar, 92, Indian journalist, founder of Dalit Voice.
- Jodi Rell, 78, American politician, governor (2004–2011) and lieutenant governor (1995–2004) of Connecticut, member of the Connecticut House of Representatives (1985–1995).
- Harry Schellenberg, 85, Canadian politician, Manitoba MLA (1993–1995, 1999–2007).
- Mynever Shuteriqi, 100, Albanian writer and academician.
- Michael P. Sullivan, 89, American attorney and businessman, President and CEO of Dairy Queen (1987–2001).
- Manohar Tahasildar, 78, Indian politician, four-time Karnataka MLA.
- Nub Tola, 28, Cambodian footballer (Nagaworld, Ministry of Interior FA, national team), suicide.
- Gail E. Wagner, 71, American paleoethnobotanist.
- Paul Watson, 72, American musician, complications from Parkinson's disease.

=== 21 ===
- H. S. Bedi, 78, Indian jurist, chief judge of the Bombay High Court (2006–2007) and judge of the Supreme Court (2007–2011).
- Alice Brock, 83, American artist and restaurateur, inspiration for "Alice's Restaurant", chronic obstructive pulmonary disease.
- Peggy Caserta, 84, American businesswoman and memoirist.
- Paul Matthews Cleveland, 93, American diplomat, ambassador to New Zealand (1986–1989) and Malaysia (1989–1992).
- Barry Coley, 77, New Zealand cricketer (Wellington).
- Gianfranco Dalla Barba, 67, Italian fencer and neurologist, Olympic champion (1984).
- K. Terry Dornbush, 91, American diplomat, ambassador to the Netherlands (1994–1998).
- Ronald Everson, 94, American politician, member of the Minnesota House of Representatives (1961–1971).
- Pehr G. Gyllenhammar, 89, Swedish automotive industry executive, chairman and CEO of Volvo (1970–1994).
- Marjan Kandus, 93, Slovene basketball player (AŠK Olimpija, Yugoslavia national team, 1960 Olympics). (death announced on this date)
- Andrea Kékesy, 98, Hungarian figure skater, Olympic silver medallist (1948).
- Manuel Lillo Torregrosa, 84, Spanish classical composer.
- Vicente de la Mata, 80, Argentine footballer (Independiente, Veracruz, national team).
- Meghanathan, 60, Indian actor (Asthram, Malappuram Haji Mahanaya Joji, The Godman), lung disease.
- Mohammad Nazir, 78, Pakistani cricket player (Railways, Punjab University, national team) and umpire.
- Laura Samuel, 48, British violinist, leiomyosarcoma.
- Richard J. Scott, 86, Canadian jurist, chief justice of Manitoba (1990–2013).
- Chandra Shekhar, 83, Indian politician, Uttarakhand MLA (2002–2007, 2012–2017), brain hemorrhage.
- Esmail Shooshtari, 74–75, Iranian politician, minister of justice (1989–2005).
- Richard J. Sklba, 89, American Roman Catholic prelate, auxiliary bishop of Milwaukee (1979–2010).
- Ray Smith, 90, English footballer (Hull City, Peterborough United, Northampton Town).
- Marc H. V. van Regenmortel, 89, Belgian virologist.
- Kathleen Wharton, 41, New Zealand rugby league player (New Zealand Warriors, Māori All Stars, national team).
- Don Young, 79, American baseball player (Chicago Cubs).

=== 22 ===
- Helmut Abt, 99, German-born American astrophysicist.
- Kenny Aird, 77, Scottish footballer (St Mirren, St Johnstone, Heart of Midlothian).
- Médard Autsai Asenga, 82, Congolese politician, governor of Orientale Province (2007–2012), MNA (since 2012).
- Norman Bodell, 86, English football player (Crewe Alexandra, Rochdale) and manager (Barrow).
- Sandra Brown, 85, English cricketer (Surrey, national team).
- Mercedes Bulnes, 74, Chilean lawyer and politician, deputy (since 2022).
- Peter Fenwick, 89, British neuropsychiatrist and neuropsychologist.
- James Fleming, 80, English author and editor.
- Jim Grant, 87, Canadian lawyer.
- Bob Hattaway, 88, American politician, member of the Florida House of Representatives (1974–1982).
- Janabil, 90, Chinese politician.
- Neal Malicky, 90, American academic administrator.
- Dragan Marković, 64, Serbian politician, mayor of Jagodina (2004–2012).
- Maryhelen Mayfield, 78, American ballerina and choreographer.
- Richard W. Murphy, 95, American diplomat, four-time ambassador and assistant secretary of state for Near Eastern and South Asian affairs (1983–1989).
- Omchery N. N. Pillai, 100, Indian playwright, novelist, and poet.
- Dumitru Popescu, 96, Romanian politician, journalist, and novelist, member of the Great National Assembly (1965–1989).
- Marianne Preger-Simon, 95, American dancer and choreographer.
- Toni Price, 63, American country blues singer, brain aneurysm.
- Rosman Abdullah, 55, Singaporean drug trafficker, hanged.
- Kirk Schuring, 72, American politician, speaker of the Ohio House of Representatives (2018), member of the Ohio Senate (2003–2010, since 2019), pancreatic cancer.
- Charles L. Scofield, 99, American politician, member of the North Dakota House of Representatives (1973–1980).
- Chris Sheffield, 61, American football player (Pittsburgh Steelers, Detroit Lions).
- László Szabó, 78, Hungarian Olympic handball player (1972).
- Cyndy Szekeres, 91, American children's author and illustrator.
- Jörg Philipp Terhechte, 49, German legal scholar and academic.
- Serge Vohor, 69, Vanuatuan politician, five-time prime minister.
- Mark Withers, 77, American actor (Kaz, Days of Our Lives, Dynasty), pancreatic cancer.
- Eduard Zehnder, 84, Swiss mathematician.

=== 23 ===
- David Black, 88, Australian historian.
- Rico Carty, 85, Dominican baseball player (Atlanta Braves, Cleveland Indians, Chicago Cubs).
- Gabriel Cotabiță, 69, Romanian singer, stroke.
- John Delzoppo, 92, Australian politician, Victorian MLA (1982–1996).
- Roberto José Dromi, 79, Argentine politician, minister of public works (1989–1991) and mayor of Mendoza (1981–1982).
- Tetsuo Harada, 75, Japanese-born French painter and sculptor.
- Fred R. Harris, 94, American politician, member of the U.S. Senate (1964–1973) and Oklahoma Senate (1957–1964).
- Karel Holý, 68, Czech ice hockey player (Sparta Praha, Czechoslovakia national team, 1980 Olympics).
- Helen Hughes, 95, New Zealand botanist, parliamentary commissioner for the environment (1987–1996).
- Jean Jourden, 82, French road racing cyclist.
- Walter Kaminsky, 83, German chemist.
- Pavel Karmanov, 54, Russian composer.
- Nikki Kaye, 44, New Zealand politician, MP (2008–2020), cancer.
- Julio Medina, 91, Colombian actor (Zoot Suit, Ilona Arrives with the Rain).
- Samaya Piriyeva, 79, Azerbaijani politician, MP (1995–1999).
- Susan Pitt, 76, American Olympic swimmer (1964), glioblastoma.
- Raymond Saunders, 84, Canadian clockmaker.
- Rajkumar Singhajit Singh, 93, Indian classical dancer.
- Fred L. Smith, 83, American economist and political writer, founder of Competitive Enterprise Institute.
- Walter King Stapleton, 90, American jurist, judge of the U.S. District Court for the District of Delaware (1970–1985) and the U.S. Court of Appeals for the Third Circuit (since 1985).
- Michael Villella, 84, American actor (The Slumber Party Massacre, Love Letters, Wild Orchid).
- Wang Weilin, 67, Chinese television producer.
- Chuck Woolery, 83, American game show host (Wheel of Fortune, Love Connection) and musician (The Avant-Garde).
- Cynthia Zukas, 93, South African-born Zambian painter.

=== 24 ===
- Ahmad Nawab, 92, Malaysian composer.
- Urs Allemann, 76, Swiss writer and journalist (Theater heute, Basler Zeitung).
- Barbara Taylor Bradford, 91, British-American novelist (A Woman of Substance, Hold the Dream).
- Breyten Breytenbach, 85, South African writer, poet, and painter, fall.
- Bob Bryar, 44, American drummer (My Chemical Romance).
- Mohamed Chaker, 93, Tunisian lawyer and politician, minister of justice (1980–1984).
- Helen Gallagher, 98, American actress (Hazel Flagg, Ryan's Hope, Pal Joey).
- Jany Gastaldi, 76, French actress (Solemn Communion, Édith et Marcel, Mina Tannenbaum).
- Charles Goodsell, 92, American academic and writer.
- Mike Hasenfratz, 58, Canadian ice hockey referee.
- Peggy Ann Jones, 85, English opera singer and actress.
- Jim Jordan, 88, Northern Irish boxer.
- Zvi Kogan, 28, Israeli-Moldovan rabbi, homicide. (body discovered on this date)
- Yōji Kuri, 96, Japanese cartoonist and independent filmmaker.
- Jos Lammertink, 66, Dutch road bicycle racer, respiratory failure.
- José Lecaros, 73, Peruvian magistrate, justice (since 2007) and president of the Supreme Court and the Judiciary (2019–2021).
- Elisa Lerner, 92, Venezuelan writer, recipient of the National Prize for Literature (1999).
- Tarky Lombardi Jr., 95, American politician, member of the New York Senate (1967–1992).
- Félix Manuel Pérez Miyares, 88, Spanish politician, minister of labour (1980–1981).
- Colin Renfrew, Baron Renfrew of Kaimsthorn, 87, British archaeologist, academic and peer, member of the House of Lords (1991–2021).
- Donald B. Robertson, 93, American politician, member of the Maryland House of Delegates (1971–1989).
- Md. Ruhul Amin, 83, Bangladeshi jurist, chief justice (2007–2008).
- Carl Runk, 88, American college lacrosse and football coach (Towson University).
- Siegfried Thiele, 90, German composer.
- Bruce Thompson, 59, American politician, Georgia labor commissioner (since 2023), member of the Georgia State Senate (2013–2023), pancreatic cancer.
- Vishakha Tripathi, 75, Indian spiritual leader and philanthropist (Jagadguru Kripalu Parishat), traffic collision.
- Jane Ward, 96, American Olympic volleyball player (1964, 1968).
- Chia-ying Yeh, 100, Chinese-born Canadian poet and sinologist.
- Joe Zuger, 84, American football player (Hamilton Tiger-Cats).

=== 25 ===
- Pedro Agramunt, 73, Spanish politician, deputy (1989–1991), senator (2008–2019), and PACE president (2016–2017).
- Miguel Ángel Ayuso Guixot, 72, Spanish Roman Catholic cardinal, prefect of the Dicastery for Interreligious Dialogue (since 2019).
- Gianfranco Calligarich, 85, Italian novelist and screenwriter.
- Grace DeMoss, 97, American amateur golfer.
- Amalia Ciardi Dupré, 89, Italian sculptor.
- Odd Flattum, 82, Norwegian politician and sports official, mayor of Modum (1991–2007), president of the Norwegian Football Federation (1992–1996).
- Gail Henley, 96, American baseball player (Pittsburgh Pirates).
- Earl Holliman, 96, American actor (Police Woman, The Rainmaker, The Twilight Zone).
- Sir Brian Jenkins, 88, British accountant and public servant, lord mayor of London (1991).
- Hal Lindsey, 95, American evangelist and Christian writer (The Late Great Planet Earth).
- Ernie McMillan, 86, American football player (St. Louis Cardinals, Green Bay Packers).
- Jaroslav Jeroným Neduha, 79, Czech singer-songwriter.
- Raimo Piltz, 86, Finnish television director.
- Will Green Poindexter, 80, American politician, member of the Mississippi House of Representatives (1976–1993).
- M. Jagannadha Rao, 88, Indian jurist, judge of the Supreme Court (1997–2000), chief judge of the Kerala High Court (1991–1994) and the Delhi High Court (1994–1997).
- James F. Rea, 87, American politician, member of the Illinois House of Representatives (1979–1989) and Senate (1989–1999).
- Harris Rosen, 85, American hotelier, investor, and philanthropist (Rosen Jewish Community Center), complications from surgery.
- Shashi Ruia, 80, Indian conglomerate industry executive, co-founder of Essar Group.
- Kuldip Singh, 92, Indian jurist, judge of the Supreme Court (1988–1996).
- Eddie Stobart, 95, British businessman (Stobart).
- Timotej, 73, Macedonian Orthodox prelate, heart disease.
- John Tinniswood, 112, British supercentenarian, world's oldest living man (since 2024).
- Andries van Aarde, 73, South African theologian.
- Lars Wistedt, 60, Swedish military officer and politician, MP (since 2022).

=== 26 ===
- Jim Abrahams, 80, American film director and screenwriter (Airplane!, The Naked Gun, Hot Shots!), leukemia.
- Mohammed Ahmed, 92, Ethiopian air travel executive.
- Saiful Islam Alif, Bangladeshi lawyer, beaten.
- Karin Baal, 84, German actress (Tired Theodore, Rosemary, Between Shanghai and St. Pauli).
- Suchir Balaji, 26, American artificial intelligence researcher and whistleblower (OpenAI), suicide.
- Victor Brombert, 101, German-born American scholar and World War II veteran (Ritchie Boys).
- Shyamdev Roy Chaudhari, 85, Indian politician, Uttar Pradesh MLA (1989–2017).
- Peter Cummins, 93, Australian actor (The Firm Man, The Removalists, Phoenix). (death announced on this date)
- Birgitta Dahl, 87, Swedish politician, minister for energy (1982–1990), minister for the environment (1986–1991), speaker of the Riksdag (1994–2002), heart failure.
- Jahangir Darvish, 91, Iranian architect (Takhti Stadium).
- Gilles Devers, 68, French lawyer and academic.
- Paul Dickenson, 74, English Olympic hammer thrower (1976, 1980) and sports commentator.
- Gabriel Escarrer, 89, Spanish hotelier, founder of Meliá Hotels International.
- Katinka Faragó, 87, Austrian-born Swedish film producer (Leningrad Cowboys Go America, Friends, Comrades) and production manager (Fanny and Alexander).
- Jan Furtok, 62, Polish football player (GKS Katowice, Hamburger SV, national team) and manager.
- John Harrop, 77, English cricketer.
- Gemma Hussey, 86, Irish politician, TD (1982–1989), senator (1977–1982) and minister for education (1982–1986).
- Brian Jackson, 91, English cricketer (Derbyshire).
- Kulasekhar, 53, Indian lyricist.
- Leah Kunkel, 76, American singer (The Coyote Sisters) and attorney.
- André Lajoinie, 94, French politician, deputy (1978–1993, 1997–2002).
- Maria Limanskaya, 100, Russian traffic controller.
- Meisho Samson, 21, Japanese racehorse, heart failure.
- Shalom Nagar, Yemeni-born Israeli prison guard, executioner of Adolf Eichmann.
- Peng Tien-fu, 73, Taiwanese politician, member of the Legislative Yuan (2002–2008), member (1990–1998) and speaker (2000–2001) of the TPCC.
- Nicolae Popa, 85, Romanian jurist, president of the High Court of Cassation and Justice (2004–2009).
- M. Harunur Rashid, 84, Bangladeshi literary scholar, director general of Bangla Academy (1991–1995), cancer.
- Pedro Orlando Reyes, 65, Cuban boxer, world amateur champion (1986).
- Diana Ruiz, 32, Ecuadorian military pilot, plane crash.
- Scott L. Schwartz, 65, American actor (Savate, Fire Down Below, Ocean's), stuntman and wrestler.
- Malcolm Smith, 83, Canadian-American motorcycle racer, complications from Parkinson's disease.
- C. S. Song, 95, Taiwanese academic and theologian.
- Sivapatham Vittal, 83, Indian endrocrinologist.

=== 27 ===
- Maria Alexandru, 84, Romanian table tennis player, world champion (1961, 1973, 1975).
- Bill Brumsickle, 89, American politician, member of the Washington House of Representatives (1989–1997).
- Joe Campbell, 89, American professional golfer.
- Amandine Chazot, 33, French standup paddleboarder, cancer.
- Ruth Faerber, 102, Australian art critic.
- Oscar Feldman, 103, American attorney.
- Tor Fosse, 58, Norwegian footballer (Bryne), cancer.
- Artt Frank, 91, American jazz drummer and biographer (Chet Baker).
- Georges Gilson, 95, French Roman Catholic prelate, auxiliary bishop of Paris (1976–1981), bishop of Le Mans (1981–1996) and archbishop of Sens (1996–2004).
- Leonor González Mina, 90, Colombian singer and actress.
- Thomas Hylland Eriksen, 62, Norwegian anthropologist.
- Takashi Inoguchi, 80, Japanese international political scientist, injuries from a fire.
- Mighty Inoue, 75, Japanese professional wrestler (AJPW, IWE) and referee, heart failure.
- Fedde Jonkman, 83, Dutch politician, mayor of Rijnsburg (1985–1997) and Waddinxveen (1997–2004).
- Bob Kelly, 97, American baseball player (Chicago Cubs, Cincinnati Redlegs, Cleveland Indians).
- Kenneth I. Kersch, 60, American political scientist.
- Morgan Lofting, 84, American voice actress (G.I. Joe, Spider-Man, Star Blazers).
- Angus Macfarlane, New Zealand education academic, Fellow of the Royal Society of New Zealand (since 2018).
- Mary McGee, 87, American Hall of Fame motorcycle racer, complications from a stroke.
- Faustine Ndugulile, 55, Tanzanian politician, MP (since 2010).
- John Stanley Pottinger, 84, American novelist and lawyer, cancer.
- Adam Somner, 57, American film producer and assistant director (Licorice Pizza, Blitz, West Side Story), anaplastic thyroid cancer.
- Bengt-Arne Strömberg, 70, Swedish football player (GAIS) and coach (IF Elfsborg, IFK Norrköping).
- Joe Tanner, 86, American politician.

=== 28 ===
- Ahmed Abdou, 88, Comorian politician, prime minister (1996–1997).
- Matthew Allin, 46, English cricketer (Devon).
- Amiya Kumar Bagchi, 87–88, Indian political economist.
- Bill Battle, 82, American football player (Alabama Crimson Tide), coach (Tennessee Volunteers) and executive, founder of the CLC.
- James Beauregard-Smith, 81, Australian convicted murderer and rapist. (death announced on this date)
- Renee Bornstein, 90, French-born British Holocaust survivor and writer, pancreatic cancer.
- Roy Brown, 77, British businessman and engineer, chairman of GKN (2004–2012).
- Ruth Butler, 93, American art historian.
- Janine Connes, 98, French astronomer.
- Lía Crucet, 72, Argentine singer, model and actress.
- Jim Earthman, 90, American politician, member of the Texas House of Representatives (1969–1973).
- Kenneth R. Grant, 83, American politician, member of the New Hampshire House of Representatives (1998–2000).
- Tom Hughes, 101, Australian politician and barrister, MP (1963–1972), attorney-general (1969–1971).
- Prince Johnson, 72, Liberian warlord and politician, senator (since 2006).
- Ananda Krishnan, 86, Malaysian conglomerate industry executive, founder of Usaha Tegas and Astro Malaysia Holdings.
- Raymond Maffiolo, 86, Swiss footballer (Servette, national team).
- John McNamee, 83, Scottish footballer (Newcastle United, Hibernian, Blackburn Rovers). (death announced on this date)
- John Osepchuk, 97, American microwave engineer.
- Iván Parejo, 37, Spanish aerobic gymnast, world champion (2008).
- Silvia Pinal, 93, Mexican actress (Maribel and the Strange Family, Viridiana, The Exterminating Angel), urinary tract infection.
- Kioumars Pourhashemi, Iranian military general, shot.
- Roeland Raes, 90, Belgian politician, senator (1991–2001).
- Nina Rasul, 94, Filipino politician, senator (1987–1995).
- Joseph Serra, 84, American politician, member of the Connecticut House of Representatives (1993–2021).
- Niel Wright, 91, New Zealand poet and literary critic.
- Trent Zelazny, 48, American author, liver failure.

=== 29 ===
- Morton I. Abramowitz, 91, American diplomat, assistant secretary of state (1985–1989) and ambassador to Thailand (1978–1981) and Turkey (1989–1991).
- Tchinda Andrade, 45, Cape Verdean LGBT activist, subject of Tchindas.
- David Arscott, 81, English author (The Frozen City) and historian.
- Anna Banana, 84, Canadian artist.
- Marshall Brickman, 85, American screenwriter (Annie Hall, Manhattan) and playwright (Jersey Boys), Oscar winner (1978).
- Bert De Coninck, 75, Belgian singer and guitarist.
- Bob Gable, 90, American politician.
- Joseph T. Gormley Jr., 92, American politician, lawyer, and jurist, member of the Connecticut House of Representatives (1961–1962), Chief State's Attorney of Connecticut (1973–1978).
- Dale Hamer, 87, American football official.
- Will Cullen Hart, 53, American musician (The Olivia Tremor Control, Circulatory System), co-founder of Elephant 6.
- Jan Hendrikx, 83, Dutch politician, Queen's commissioner of Overijssel (1988–2002), senator (2007–2011).
- Josef Jelínek, 83, Czech footballer (Dukla Prague, VTŽ Chomutov, Czechoslovakia national team).
- Tony Jian, 69, Taiwanese politician, member of the Legislative Yuan (2002–2005, 2010–2011), esophageal cancer.
- Christian Juttner, 60, American actor (Return from Witch Mountain, I Wanna Hold Your Hand, The Swarm).
- Christiane Klapisch-Zuber, 87, French historian, anthropologist and academic.
- Lynn T. Landmesser, 80, American neuroscientist.
- Larry McIntyre, 75, Canadian ice hockey player (Toronto Maple Leafs).
- Thirman Milner, 91, American politician, mayor of Hartford, Connecticut (1981–1987), member of the Connecticut House of Representatives (1979–1981) and Senate (1993–1995).
- Lance Morrow, 85, American writer and journalist, prostate cancer.
- Eva Mosnáková, 95, Slovak human rights activist and Holocaust survivor.
- Rafig Nasirov, 77, Azerbaijani sculptor.
- Wayne Northrop, 77, American actor (Dynasty, Days of Our Lives, Port Charles), complications from Alzheimer's disease.
- Antonio Romero, 69, Spanish politician, deputy (1989–1995) and senator (1986–1989).
- John N. Sofos, 76, Greek-born American food scientist.
- Peter B. Teeley, 84, American political consultant and diplomat, ambassador to Canada (1992–1993), cancer.
- Ian Trewhella, 79, Australian athlete, four-time Paralympic silver medalist (1980, 1984).
- James E. Ulland, 82, American politician, member of the Minnesota House of Representatives (1969–1977) and Senate (1977–1985).
- Beth Usher, 45, American motivational speaker and writer, metastatic endometrial cancer.
- Peter Westbrook, 72, American fencer, Olympic bronze medalist (1984), liver cancer.

=== 30 ===
- Steve Alaimo, 84, American singer ("Every Day I Have to Cry") and record producer, co-founder of TK Records.
- Fernando Aspiazu, 89, Ecuadorian businessman (Emelec), minister of economy and finance (1979–1980).
- Martin Benson, 87, American artistic director.
- Henze Boekhout, 77, Dutch artist and photographer.
- Lou Carnesecca, 99, American Hall of Fame basketball coach (New York Nets, St. John's Red Storm).
- René Couanau, 88, French politician, deputy (1988–2012).
- Susan Duncan, 72–73, Australian writer and editor (The Australian Women's Weekly, New Idea).
- John Felske, 82, American baseball player (Milwaukee Brewers, Chicago Cubs) and manager (Philadelphia Phillies).
- Eva Hermans-Kroot, 26, Dutch blogger, lung cancer.
- Sir Gerald Hosker, 91, British lawyer and public servant, Procurator General and Treasury Solicitor (1992–1995).
- Kanta Saroop Krishen, 95, Indian social worker.
- Francis C. Marsano, 88, American politician, member of the Maine House of Representatives (1986–1992).
- Prithwindra Mukherjee, 88, Indian author and researcher.
- Howard W. Peak, 75, American politician, mayor of San Antonio (1997–2001).
- Pepe Pinto, 95, Spanish football player (Barcelona, Real Valladolid) and manager (Girona).
- Ryszard Poznakowski, 78, Polish musician, composer and arranger.
- Qi Zhengjun, 100, Chinese army lieutenant general.
- Ladislav Rygl Sr., 77, Czech Olympic Nordic combined skier (1968, 1972), world champion (1970).
- Jeremy Seabrook, 85, British author and journalist.
- Robert Skoglund, 88, American humorist, columnist, and radio personality (Maine Public Radio).
- Donald H. Turner, 60, American politician, member of the Vermont House of Representatives (2007–2019), glioblastoma.
- Michael Whelan, 93, British physicist.
- Nizoramo Zaripova, 101, Tajik politician, member of the Supreme Soviet of the Soviet Union (1958–1966).
