= Éden Pedroso =

Brazilian politician (1943–2024)

Member of the Legislative Assembly of Rio Grande do Sul
- In office 1 February 1987 – 31 January 1991

Member of the Chamber of Deputies of Brazil for Rio Grande do Sul
- In office 1 February 1991 – 31 January 1995

Personal details
- Born: Éden José Rodrigues Pedroso; 15 May 1943 Passo Fundo, Rio Grande do Sul, Brazil
- Died: 7 November 2024 (aged 81) Porto Alegre, Rio Grande do Sul, Brazil
- Political party: PDT
- Education: University of Passo Fundo

Éden José Rodrigues Pedroso (15 May 1943 – 7 November 2024) was a Brazilian politician. A member of the Democratic Labour Party, he served in the Legislative Assembly of Rio Grande do Sul from 1987 to 1991 and in the Chamber of Deputies from 1991 to 1995.

Pedroso died in Porto Alegre on 7 November 2024, at the age of 81.
