= Ugo Zorco =

Italian field hockey player (1938–2024)

Personal information
- Nationality: Italian
- Born: 16 February 1938 Cagliari, Italy
- Died: 15 November 2024 (aged 86) Cagliari

Sport
- Sport: Field hockey

Ugo Zorco (16 February 1938 – 15 November 2024) was an Italian field hockey player. He competed in the men's tournament at the 1960 Summer Olympics.
