= Nestor Rateș =

Romanian-American journalist (1933–2024)

Nestor Rateș (7 April 1933 – 5 November 2024) was a Romanian–American journalist and writer. An opponent of Nicolae Ceaușescu's communist dictatorship, Rateș moved to the United States in 1973, where he became a prominent figure in the Romanian exile community through his work with Radio Free Europe's Romanian language broadcasts. Rateș spent decades reporting and working for RFE, including two tenures as head of the Romanian Desk of Radio Free Europe in 1989 and again from 1994 to 2002, from offices in Washington D.C., Munich and Prague. Rateș oversaw RFE's operations which provided Romanians information about domestic news, the outside world, and events in other Warsaw Pact countries during the communist era.

Rateș completed his bachelor's degree in philosophy from the University of Bucharest. He began his journalism career at Agerpres, the national news agency of Romania, before moving to the United States in 1973.

Nestor Rateș died on 5 November 2024, at the age of 91. His death was announced by the Institute for the Investigation of Communist Crimes in Romania.
