= Samaya Piriyeva =

Azerbaijani politician (1945–2024)

- Səmayə Piriyeva

Member of the National Assembly of Azerbaijan
- In office 24 November 1995 – 28 June 1999

Personal details
- Born: Samaya Aslan gizi Piriyeva; 17 June 1945 Kazi-Magomed, Azerbaijan SSR, USSR
- Died: 23 November 2024 (aged 79) Hajiqabul, Azerbaijan
- Party: YAP
- Education: Baku State University; Baku Higher Party School
- Occupation: Schoolteacher

Samaya Aslan gizi Piriyeva (Azerbaijani: Səmayə Aslan qızı Piriyeva; 17 June 1945 – 23 November 2024) was an Azerbaijani schoolteacher and politician. A member of the New Azerbaijan Party, she served in the National Assembly from 1995 to 1999 and later served as the head of the Sabirabad District Executive Power from 1999 to 2000.

Piriyeva died in Hajiqabul on 23 November 2024, at the age of 79.
