= Don Cowan (footballer, born 1931) =

English footballer (1931–2024)

Personal information
- Full name: Donald Cowan
- Date of birth: 17 August 1931
- Place of birth: Sherburn, County Durham, England
- Date of death: 19 November 2024 (aged 93)
- Place of death: Bishop Auckland, England
- Position: Goalkeeper

Youth career
- Bowburn Juniors
- Middlesbrough

Senior career*
Years	Team	Apps	(Gls)
1952–1954	Darlington	17	(0)
- North Shields
- * Club domestic league appearances and goals

Donald Cowan (17 August 1931 – 19 November 2024) was an English footballer who played in the Football League as a goalkeeper for Darlington.

Cowan was born in Sherburn, County Durham. He began his football career with local club Bowburn, and was on the books of Middlesbrough as an apprentice. After completing his National Service in the Royal Air Force, he turned professional with Darlington, with whom he made 17 league appearances over two seasons. He then played non-league football with North Shields.

He went on to be an administrator in local football in the County Durham area for many years, and was a vice-president of the Durham County Football Association.

Cowan died in Bishop Auckland on 19 November 2024, at the age of 93.
