= Sergey Govorushko =

Russian geographer (1955–2024)

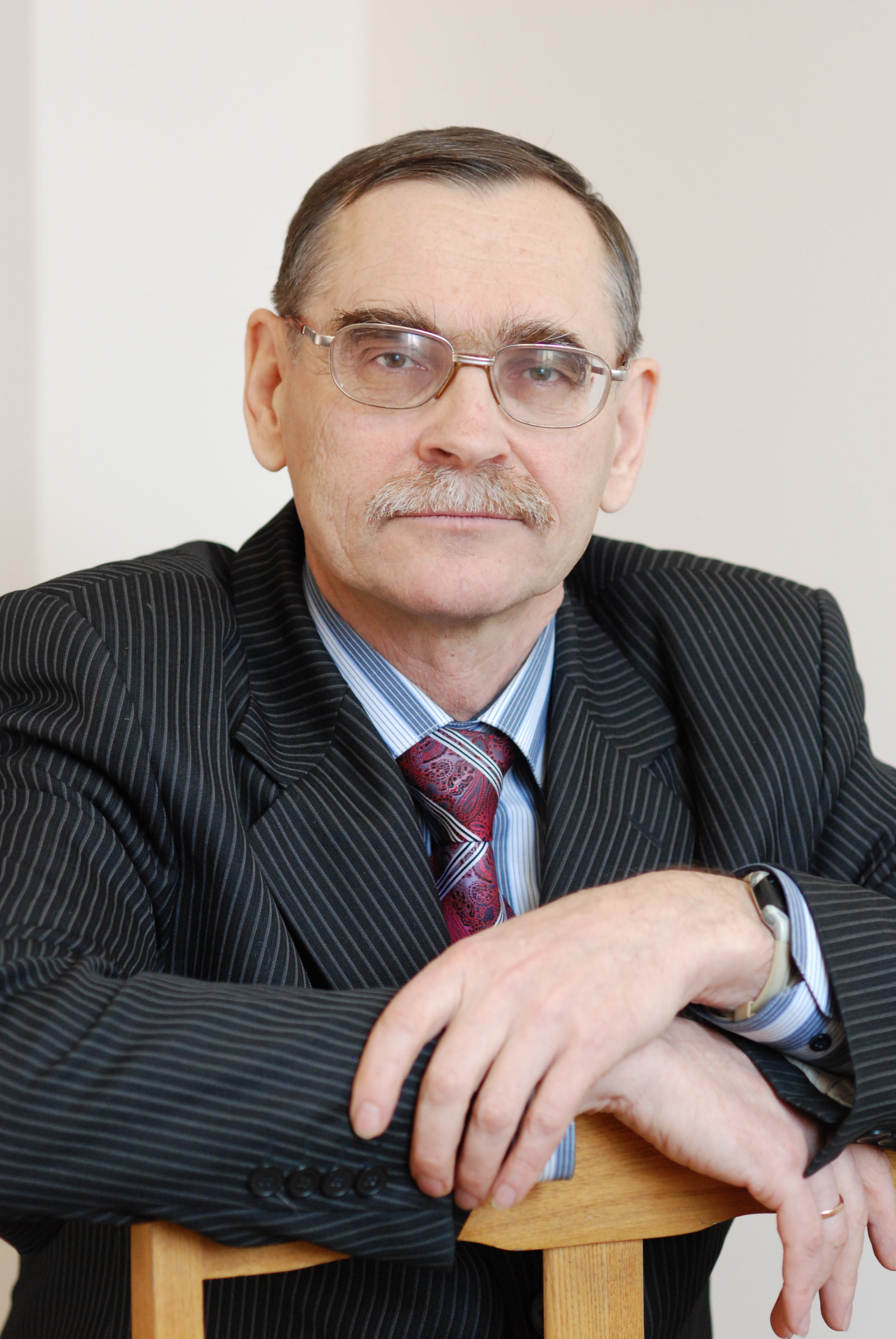

Sergey Govorushko (Russian: Сергей Михайлович Говорушко; 9 May 1955 – 16 November 2024) was a Russian scientist who was laureate of the 2012 Grigoriev Prize of the Russian Academy of Sciences. He was a Doktor nauk, Principal Researcher at the Pacific Geographical Institute of the Far Eastern Branch of the Russian Academy of Sciences, Professor at the Far Eastern Federal University.

== Life and career ==
In 1977, Govorushko graduated from the Far Eastern State University. He was a student of Prof. Boris Vtyurin.

In 1984, Govorushko defended his Candidate's Dissertation. In 2002, he defended his doctoral dissertation.

Since 1975 he worked at the Pacific Geographical Institute of the Far Eastern Branch of the Russian Academy of Sciences, later as Principal Researcher.

His work was supported by the Russian Foundation for Basic Research.

In 2014, he received the title of Professor of School of Natural Sciences at the Far Eastern Federal University.

In 2016, he was a candidate for Corresponding Member of the Russian Academy of Sciences.

He was a member of the Editorial Board for Annals of the University of Craiova. Series Geography.

Govorushko was the author of more than 230 published works including 26 monographs. He was author of monograph Human-Insect Interactions (CRC Press, 2017).

Govorushko died on 16 November 2024, at the age of 69.
