= Joseph T. Gormley Jr. =

American politician (1932–2024)

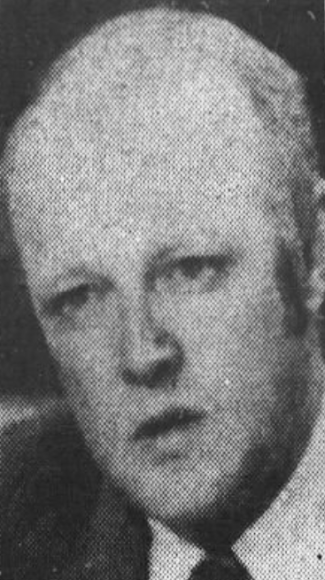
- Gormley in 1977

Member of the Connecticut House of Representatives
- In office 1961–1962

Personal details
- Born: August 24, 1932 Norwalk, Connecticut, U.S.
- Died: November 29, 2024 (aged 92)
- Party: Republican
- Occupation: Lawyer, jurist

Joseph T. Gormley Jr. (August 24, 1932 – November 29, 2024) was an American lawyer, jurist and politician. A member of the Republican Party, he served in the Connecticut House of Representatives from 1961 to 1962.

== Life and career ==
Gormley was born in Norwalk, Connecticut, the son of Joseph and Eudora Gormley. He attended Fairfield College Preparatory School on a scholarship. He served in the United States Air Force from 1956 to 1959, which after his discharge, he moved to Monroe, Connecticut, and began practicing law.

Gormley was elected as a Republican in the Connecticut House of Representatives in 1960, serving from 1961 to 1962, when he resigned, having been appointed assistant state's attorney for Fairfield County. He was elevated to state's attorney for Fairfield County in 1969, and in 1973, he was made the first Chief State's Attorney of Connecticut, the state's top prosecutor. He served in that role until 1978, returning to private practice. He was appointed a judge of the Connecticut Superior Court in 1987, serving several roles with that court until his retirement in 2008.

== Death ==
Gormley died on November 29, 2024, at the age of 92.
