= Henryk Kocój =

Polish historian (1931–2024)

Henryk Kocój (3 March 1931 – 4 November 2024) was a Polish historian. Professor of the Silesian University, he specialised in the Polish history of the 17th and 18th century, in particular, the history of the Constitution of 3 May, Great Sejm, and the partitions of Poland.

Henryk Kocój was born in Oświęcim on 3 March 1931. He studied at the Jagiellonian University. He died on 4 November 2024, at the age of 93.

== Publications ==
- Śląsk a insurekcja kościuszkowska, Katowice 1986
- Zaborcy wobec Konstytucji 3 Maja, Katowice 1991
- Der Untergang des Mai – Verfassung vom 1791 im Lichte der Korrespondenz Friedrich Wilhelm II mit dem Preußischen Gesandten Girolamo Lucchesini, Katowice 1999
- Elektor saski Fryderyk August III wobec Konstytucji 3 Maja, Kraków 1999
- Prusy wobec powstania kościuszkowskiego, Katowice 1999
- Konstytucja 3 Maja w relacjach posła austriackiego w Warszawie Benedykta de Cachégo, Katowice 1999
- Konstytucja 3 Maja w relacjach posła saskiego Franciszka Essena, Katowice 1999
- Problem sukcesji saskiej w latach 1791–1792 w świetle ówczesnej korespondencji dyplomatycznej z Drezna i Merseburga (wybór materiałów archiwalnych), Katowice 1999
- Dyplomacja pruska w przeddzień II rozbioru Polski (wybór materiałów archiwalnych), Katowice 2000
- Beiträge zur Preussens Stellung gegenüber dem Kościuszko- Aufstand vom Jahre 1794. Ausgewählte Probleme, Katowice 2000
- Od Sejmu Wielkiego do powstania listopadowego. Wybór materiałów źródłowych, artykułów i recenzji, Kraków 2002
- Targowica i sejm grodzieński 1793 w relacjach posła pruskiego Ludwiga Buchholtza, Kraków 2005
- Berlin wobec Konstytucji 3 maja, Kraków 2007
- Relacje posła pruskiego Ludwiga Buchholtza o insurekcji kościuszkowskiej, Kraków 2007
- Upadek Konstytucji 3 maja w świetle korespondencji Fryderyka Wilhelma II z posłem pruskim, Katowice 2008
- Austria wobec Konstytucji 3 maja, Kraków 2008
- Plany II rozbioru Polski w polityce Berlina w latach 1791–1792, Katowice 2008
