= Pedro Machete =

Portuguese judge (1965–2024)

Justice of the Constitutional Court of Portugal
- In office 1 October 2012 – 25 April 2023
- Preceded by: Rui Moura Ramos
- Succeeded by: João Carlos Gonçalves Loureiro

Personal details
- Born: Pedro Manuel Pena Chancerelle de Machete; 11 July 1965 Lisbon, Portugal
- Died: 9 November 2024 (aged 59)
- Education: Catholic University of Portugal
- Occupation: Judge

Pedro Manuel Pena Chancerelle de Machete (11 July 1965 – 9 November 2024) was a Portuguese judge. He served on the Constitutional Court from 2012 to 2023, and served as its vicepresident.

Machete died from cancer on 9 November 2024, at the age of 59.
