= Herby Moreau =

Haitian-born Canadian journalist and television presenter (1968–2024)

- Born: 19 July 1968; Haiti
- Died: 3 November 2024 (aged 56)
- Education: Université de Montréal; École supérieure de journalisme de Lille
- Occupations: Journalist; Television presenter

Herby Moreau (19 July 1968 – 3 November 2024) was a Haitian-born Canadian journalist and television presenter.

== Life and career ==
Born in Haiti on 19 July 1968, Moreau arrived in Montreal at the age of five. He became a journalist following his studies in Lille. He played the role of James Brown Martine St. Clair's video clip Je veux vous embrasser, directed by James DiSalvio, 1989 . In 1989, he first worked in television as a production assistant for Julie Snyder on her show Sortir. After working with Snyder for 18 years, Moreau presented the Auditions de Star Académie. He worked as a general news journalist for La Première, a correspondent for the magazine Elle Québec, and a daily cultural presenter for TVA. In 2009, he created his own TV channel on the internet, herby.tv.

Moreau died on 3 November 2024, at the age of 56.
