= Frog (writer) =

American writer (died 2024)

David Henry Miller (died November 2, 2024), better known by the nickname Frog, was an American writer and street vendor of self-published joke books in Eugene, Oregon.

Frog was originally from Cincinnati, Ohio, and was educated at Ohio University for two years before dropping out. He moved to Eugene, Oregon in 1981. He began selling joke books, which he wrote and illustrated by hand, in 1986. He became well known in the local community for selling his books at the Eugene Saturday Market, the Holiday Market, the WOW Hall, the Oregon Country Fair, and on 13th Avenue. He wrote over 100 books and charged $3 for his adult joke books and $2 for his children's joke books. He was sociable with customers and was known for his marketing pitch phrase, "Have you ever seen the greatest joke book the world has ever known?". He wore a sign advertising his books and was accompanied by a rubber chicken named Squeeze that he allowed passerby to squeeze for free.

In the 1990s, the city of Eugene banned Frog from selling his books on the street because of a civil ordinance that did not allow books to be sold by street vendors. He sued the city, arguing that the ban restricted his first amendment rights to free expression. In 1993, the Oregon Supreme Court heard the case and ruled in Frog's favor. Frog became a community icon in Eugene. He was voted by readers of Eugene Weekly as "Best Rabblerouser" in 2018. He was also voted as the "Best Local Visionary" in 2022. Several of his books are held in the Lane County History Museum.

In 2024, Frog's roommate said that Frog had symptoms of congestive heart failure and tested positive for COVID-19. He died on November 2, 2024, at 76 years old. A plaque honoring his memory was installed on 13th Avenue on November 2, 2025.
