= Eddie Millar =

Australian rules footballer (1938–2024)

Personal information
- Full name: Eddie Millar
- Born: 24 June 1938
- Died: 12 November 2024 (aged 86)
- Original team: Collingwood Under 19s
- Height: 183 cm (6 ft 0 in)
- Weight: 86 kg (190 lb)

Playing career
Years	Club	Games (Goals)
1958–59	Collingwood	5 (1)

Eddie Millar (24 June 1938 – 12 November 2024) was an Australian rules footballer who played with Collingwood in the Victorian Football League (VFL).
