= Helmut Pflugradt =

German politician (1949–2024)

Member of the Bürgerschaft of Bremen
- In office 13 October 1975 – 26 October 2009

Personal details
- Born: 7 February 1949 Ritterhude, Lower Saxony, Germany
- Died: 10 November 2024 (aged 75) Bremen, Germany
- Party: CDU
- Occupation: Civil servant

Helmut Pflugradt (7 February 1949 – 10 November 2024) was a German civil servant and politician. A member of the Christian Democratic Union, he served in the Bürgerschaft of Bremen from 1975 to 2009.

Pflugradt died in Bremen on 10 November 2024, at the age of 75.
