= Rampilla Narasayamma =

Indian freedom fighter (1925–2024)

- Born: 1925
- Died: 13 November 2024
- Known for: Participation in Indian independence movement

Rampilla Narasayamma (1925–13 November 2024) was an Indian freedom fighter who actively participated in the country's struggle for independence. She hailed from the state of Andhra Pradesh. She joined Gandhi's Salt March movement, which was an act of civil disobedience against British rule.

== Career ==
She undertook multiple responsibilities in the struggle for independence, alongside her husband Sardar Rampilla Suryanarayana. The couple played a role in supporting revolutionary activities, particularly in the preparation and distribution of explosives to aid freedom fighters. They were jailed for their involvement in the Goa liberation movement.

Under the leadership of her husband, a team of approximately forty individuals manufactured bombs on Vidyadharapuram Hill near Indrakiladri in Vijayawada. To maintain secrecy, they posed as individuals learning horse riding, a strategy that avoided drawing attention from neighbors or authorities. Narasayamma helped with transporting these explosives, concealing them under her silk sarees in trunk boxes. Together, she and her husband traveled extensively, often under the pretense of going on pilgrimages. They were actually delivering these explosives to members of the Revolutionary Socialist Party.

The couple's contributions were not without risk. They were arrested on December 3, 1943, in connection with the Bezwada Bomb Case and were sentenced to four years of imprisonment in Rayavellur and Alipur jails.

After India gained independence, the couple continued their activism, participating in the liberation struggles of Goa and Pondicherry, which were still under foreign rule. Narasayamma was arrested again, along with her husband, for allegedly supplying arms to Portuguese freedom fighters.

== Personal life ==
She married Sardar Rampilla Suryanarayana and gave birth to a son, Rampilla Jayaprakash, on April 10, 1958. She spent six months in jail with her newborn.

== Death ==
Narasayamma died at her home in Vijayawada on 27 November 2024, at the age of 99.
