= Tomasz Gruszecki =

Polish politician (1945–2024)

Minister of Ownership Transformations
- In office 23 December 1991 – 11 July 1992
- Preceded by: Janusz Lewandowski
- Succeeded by: Janusz Lewandowski

Personal details
- Born: 22 November 1945 Lublin, Poland
- Died: 2 November 2024 (aged 78)
- Education: University of Warsaw
- Occupation: Economist

Tomasz Gruszecki (22 November 1945 – 2 November 2024) was a Polish economist and politician. He served as Minister of Ownership Transformations from 1991 to 1992.

Gruszecki died on 2 November 2024, at the age of 78.
