= Dirk Nuyts =

Belgian politician (1952–2024)

- Born: 20 March 1952
- Died: November 2024 (aged 72)
- Occupation: Politician

Dirk Nuyts (20 March 1952 – November 2024) was a Belgian politician who was a member of the Christian Social Party / Christen-Democratisch en Vlaams. He served as the mayor of Schilde between 1995 and 2000.

== Biography ==
Nuyts worked as regional director at Dexia bank, that later became Belfius for over 30 years. After having been a municipal councillor in the municipality of Schilde for 6 years, he became alderman for youth, culture, sports and development cooperation in 1989. During this legislature, he also became a civil registrar. After the 1994 Belgian local elections, he became mayor of Schilde, leading a coalition of CD&V and VLD. He has been described as a mayor that he stood among the citizens with respect for members of other parties.

Six years later at the 2000 Belgian local elections, Nuys had a high score personally. However, VLD also scored high, which led to very difficult coalition negotiations. These ultimately made him give up the sash to make way for Yolande Avontroodt (Open VLD) who became mayor. Nuyts subsequently resigned as a city councilor.

In 2008, Nuyts became press officer of the Flemish Parliament. He was still the press officer in June 2024.

Nuyts died at his home in November 2024, at the age of 72.
