= Barry Coley =

New Zealand cricketer (1946–2024)

Personal information
- Full name: Barry David Coley
- Born: 20 December 1946; Wellington, New Zealand
- Died: 21 November 2024 (aged 77); Melbourne, Victoria, Australia
- Batting: Right-handed
- Role: Wicket-keeper

Domestic team information
- Years: Team
- 1971/72: Wellington
- Source: Cricinfo, 24 October 2020

Barry David Coley (20 December 1946 – 21 November 2024) was a New Zealand cricketer. He played in three first-class matches for Wellington in 1971/72.

Coley moved to Australia, where he worked as a schoolteacher in Melbourne. He died there after a long illness on 21 November 2024, at the age of 77.
