= Vincenzo Perrone =

Italian politician (1937–2024)

Member of the Chamber of Deputies of Italy for Lecce-Brindisi-Taranto
- In office 18 April 1992 – 14 April 1994

Personal details
- Born: 5 November 1937 Milan, Italy
- Died: 17 November 2024 (aged 87) Lecce, Italy
- Party: DC
- Occupation: Entrepreneur

Vincenzo Perrone (5 November 1937 – 17 November 2024) was an Italian entrepreneur and politician. A member of Christian Democracy, he served in the Chamber of Deputies from 1992 to 1994.

Perrone died in Lecce on 17 November 2024, at the age of 87.
