= Eugen Gerritz =

German politician (1935–2024)

Member of the Landtag of North Rhine-Westphalia
- In office 29 May 1980 – 31 May 1995

Personal details
- Born: 25 February 1935 Bitburg, Gau Koblenz-Trier, Germany
- Died: 8 November 2024 (aged 89) Krefeld, North Rhine-Westphalia, Germany
- Party: SPD
- Education: University of Freiburg; LMU Munich; University of Bonn
- Occupation: Schoolteacher

Eugen Gerritz (25 February 1935 – 8 November 2024) was a German politician. A member of the Social Democratic Party, he served in the Landtag of North Rhine-Westphalia from 1980 to 1995.

Gerritz died in Krefeld on 8 November 2024, at the age of 89.
