= Bobby Harris (politician) =

American politician (1941–2024)

Robert Allen Harris (February 17, 1941 – November 13, 2024) was an American politician who was a member of the Georgia House of Representatives from 1985 to 1995. He died at his home in Lincoln County, Georgia, on November 13, 2024, at the age of 83.
