= Henk van Rooy =

Dutch footballer (1948–2024)

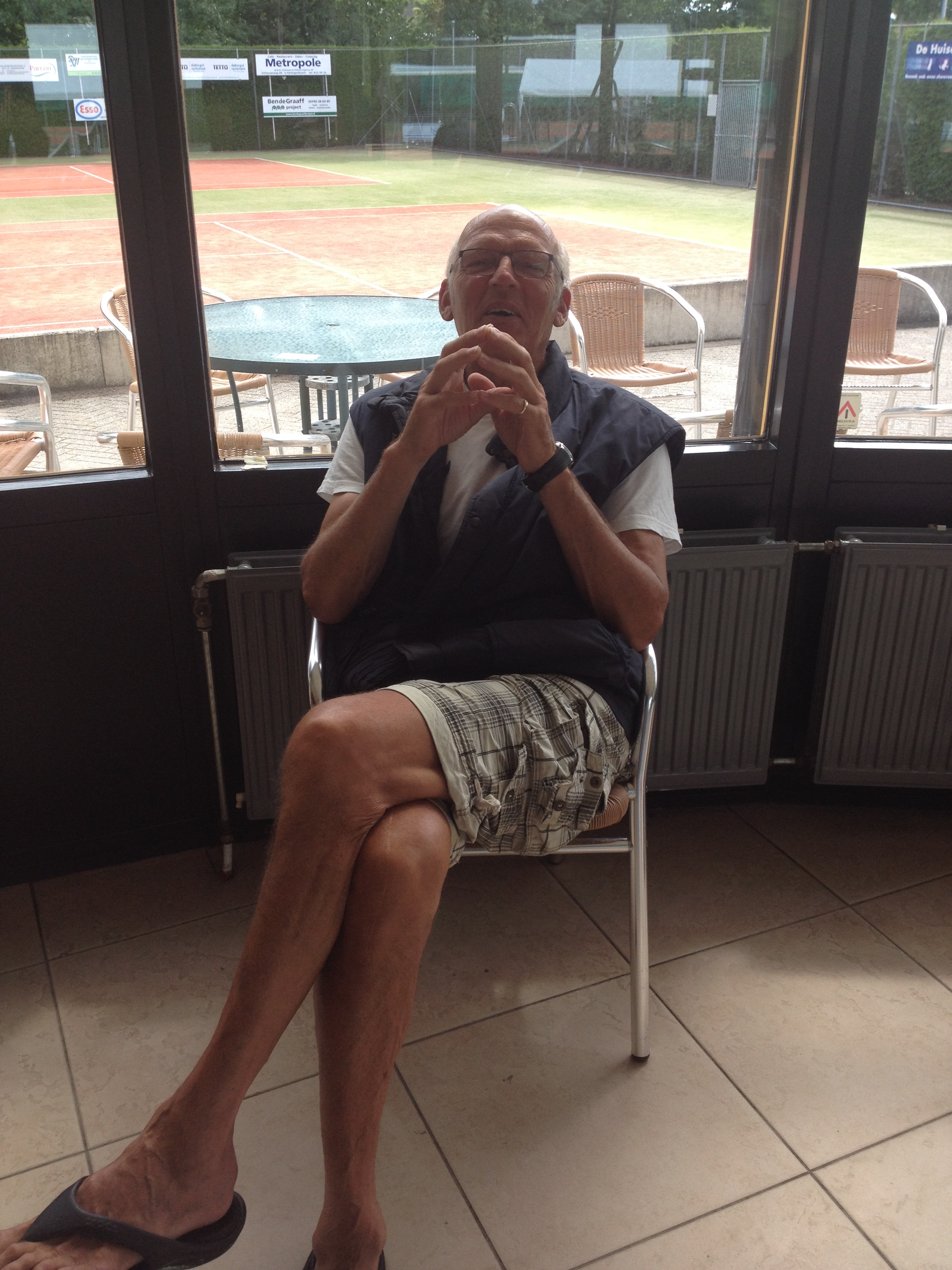
- Van Rooij (2017)

Personal information
- Date of birth: 10 January 1948
- Place of birth: 's-Hertogenbosch, Netherlands
- Date of death: 19 November 2024 (aged 76)
- Place of death: Vught, Netherlands
- Height: 1.93 m (6 ft 4 in)
- Position: Forward

Senior career*
Years	Team	Apps	(Gls)
1965–1967	RKVV Wilhelmina	17	(7)
1967–1969	FC Den Bosch	5	(1)
1969–1971	DESK		
1971–1973	Roda JC	76	(31)
1973–1975	NAC	37	(8)
1975–1980	Willem II	151	(48)
1975–1976	→ Heracles (loan)	7	(1)
1980–1982	K.V. Mechelen	44	(8)
- * Club domestic league appearances and goals

Henk van Rooy also written as Henk van Rooij (10 January 1948 – 19 November 2024) was a Dutch footballer who played as a forward.

== Career ==
Van Rooy was born in 's-Hertogenbosch in 1948. He started playing there with RKVV Wilhelmina, where he played from 1965 at the Tweede Divisie. The following two years he had a contract with FC Den Bosch that played in the Eerste Divisie, but only played six matches with the first team. During his time with FC Den Bosch he mainly played and scored with the second team. In a 7–0 victory against De Volewijckers, Van Rooy scored all seven goals.

After his contract ended he started playing with the amateur team VV DESK and made it to the Dutch military football team. There he was scouted by Roda JC Kerkrade where he started playing in the Eerste Divisie from 1971. During the two seasons he played with the team he scored 31 goals. From 1973 he signed a contract with NAC Breda and made his debut in the Eredivisie. After two seasons with NAC he played five seasons with Willem II Tilburg where he became a popular player. He played with the club a total of 164 matches and scored 53 times. After the 1978–79 season the club was promoted to the Eredivisie. The next season Van Rooy scored nine times in the Eredivisie. Van Rooy ended his career with the Belgian club K.V. Mechelen, where he played two seasons. Also here the team promoted.

== Death ==
Van Rooy died from Alzheimer's disease at the Boswijk nursing home in Vught, on 19 November 2024, at the age of 76. Willem II Tilburg will hold a minute's silence in his memory at a subsequent match.
