= Raimo Piltz =

Finnish television director (1938–2024)

- Born: 27 May 1938; Helsinki, Finland
- Died: 25 November 2024 (aged 86)
- Occupation: Television director

Raimo Piltz (27 May 1938 – 25 November 2024) was a Finnish television director.

== Life and career ==
Piltz worked as a television director at Mainos-TV from 1960 to 1963 and afterwards at Yleisradio's TV1 from 1963 to 1981. He was head of the Swedish-language sports department and chief producer from 1984 to 2001. He retired in 2001.

He is most known for directing major international sporting events.

He received the Finnish Sports Culture and Sports Gold Medal in 2001, and the Finnish Cultural Foundation's Recognition Award in 1980.

Piltz died on 25 November 2024, at the age of 86.
