= Ursula Preuhs =

German politician (1931–2024)

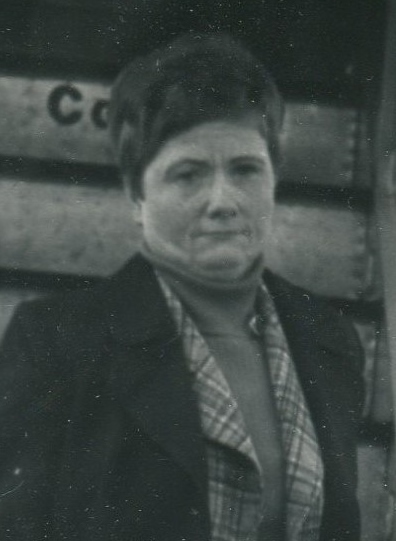

Member of the Hamburg Parliament
- In office 1986–1997

Personal details
- Born: 30 September 1931 Hamburg, Germany
- Died: 4 November 2024 (aged 93) Hamburg, Germany
- Party: SPD
- Occupation: Nurse

Ursula Preuhs (30 September 1931 – 4 November 2024) was a German politician. A member of the Social Democratic Party, she served in the Hamburg Parliament from 1986 to 1997.

Preuhs died in Hamburg on 4 November 2024, at the age of 93.
