= Joseph R. D'Cruz =

Canadian academic (1941–2024)

Joseph R. D'Cruz (19 June 1941 – 5 November 2024) was a Canadian academic who was professor of strategic management at the University of Toronto's Rotman School of Management. D'Cruz worked at the University of Toronto from 1979 until the second decade of the 21st century. Amongst other various positions, D'Cruz held the title of Academic Co-Director of the Advanced Health Leadership Program since 2007, and Academic Director of the Health Care Executive Programs since 2001. D'Cruz was also the Murray B. Koffler Chair between 2003 and 2006. She died on 5 November 2024, at the age of 83.

== Education ==
D'Cruz earned the following academic degrees, listed in order of certification:

- 1963 - Bachelor of Arts, University of the Punjab
- 1965 - Master of Business Administration, University of Karachi
- 1979 - Doctor of Business Administration, Harvard University
