= John N. Sofos =

Greek-American food scientist (1948–2024)

- Ιωάννης Ν. Σοφός
- Born: c. 1948; Arachnaion, Argolida, Greece
- Died: November 29, 2024; Fort Collins, Colorado, United States
- Education: Aristotle University of Thessaloniki; University of Minnesota
- Known for: Food safety, foodborne pathogens
- Scientific career
- Fields: Food science, microbiology
- Workplaces: Colorado State University

John (Ioannis) Nikolaos Sofos (1948 – November 29, 2024) was a Greek-American food scientist and microbiologist known for his contributions to food safety, particularly in the study and control of foodborne pathogens. He served as a University Distinguished Professor at Colorado State University.

== Early life and education ==
Sofos was born in Arachnaion, Argolida, Greece. He earned a Bachelor of Science in Agriculture from the Aristotle University of Thessaloniki in 1971. He then moved to the United States to pursue graduate studies at the University of Minnesota, receiving a Master of Science in Animal Science in 1975 and a Ph.D. in Food Science in 1979.

== Academic career ==
In 1980, Sofos joined the faculty of Colorado State University (CSU), where he remained for more than three decades. He was later named University Distinguished Professor and, following his retirement in 2015, Professor Emeritus. At CSU, he directed the Center for Meat Safety and Quality and conducted research on food safety and microbiology. His work focused on the ecology, detection, and control of pathogens in food systems, as well as microbial resistance to preservation methods.

Sofos has made key contributions to the understanding of foodborne pathogens, in particular those of Escherichia coli, Salmonella, and Listeria. His yearlong research involved pathogen detection, protection strategies, and microbial responses to the several environmental stresses in the food systems.

He authored or co-authored numerous scientific publications and was widely invited to present his work internationally. Sofos served on national and international advisory bodies, including the U.S. National Advisory Committee on Microbiological Criteria for Foods, and contributed to food safety policy development in the United States.

He also held roles in international organizations, including the European Food Safety Authority, where he contributed to scientific risk assessment activities. For nearly two decades, he served as a scientific editor of the Journal of Food Protection.

== Recognition ==
Sofos received several honors for his contributions to food science, including awards from the American Meat Science Association, the American Society of Animal Science, and the U.S. Department of Agriculture. He was elected Fellow of several professional organizations, including the American Academy of Microbiology and the Institute of Food Technologists.

In 2024, he was awarded an honorary doctorate by the Agricultural University of Athens. He mentored many graduate students and researchers who later pursued careers in academia, industry, and government.

== Personal life and death ==
Sofos resided in Fort Collins, Colorado. He died on November 29, 2024, at the age of 76.
