= Marcel Tassy =

French politician (1932–2024)

Deputy of the French National Assembly for Bouches-du-Rhône's 8th constituency
- In office 2 April 1978 – 22 May 1981
- Preceded by: Jean Masse
- Succeeded by: Marius Masse

Member of the General Council of Bouches-du-Rhône for the Canton of Marseille – Saint-Just
- In office 1973–1979
- Preceded by: Marius Massias
- Succeeded by: Colette Chauvin

Personal details
- Born: 27 December 1932 Marseille, France
- Died: 3 November 2024 (aged 91)
- Party: PCF
- Occupation: Electrician

Marcel Tassy (27 December 1932 – 3 November 2024) was a French politician of the French Communist Party (PCF). He served as General Councillor of the Canton of Marseille – Saint-Just from 1973 to 1979 and was a member of the National Assembly representing Bouches-du-Rhône's 8th constituency from 1978 to 1981.

Tassy died on 3 November 2024, at the age of 91.
