= Zhenis Nurgaliyev =

Kazakh politician (1962–2024)

Jeñıs Nūrğaliev
- Жеңіс Нұрғалиев
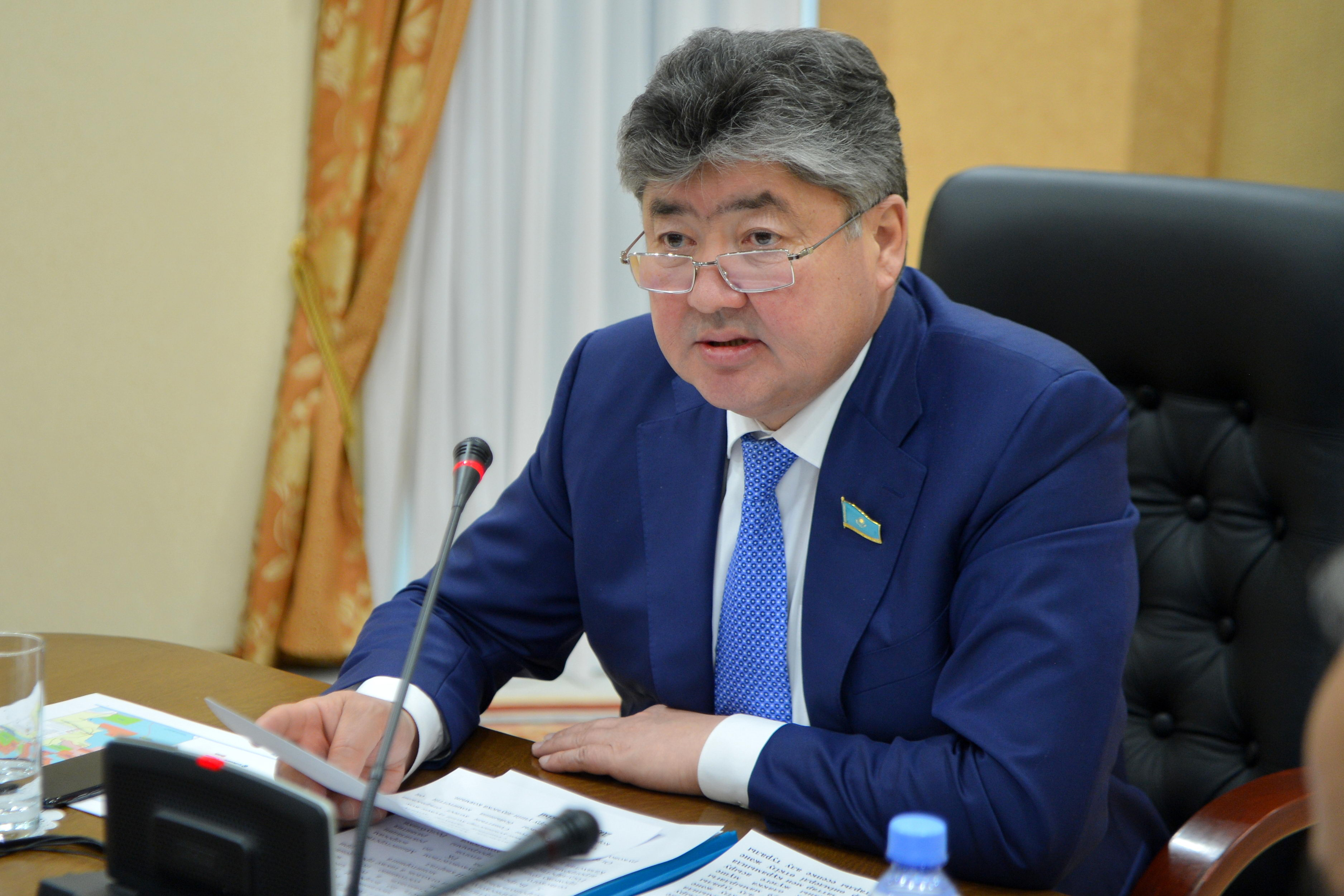
- Nūrğaliev in 2018

Member of the Senate of Kazakhstan
- In office 23 April 2010 – January 2023

Personal details
- Born: 9 May 1962 Amangeldi, Kustanay Oblast, Kazakh SSR, Soviet Union
- Died: 16 November 2024 (aged 62)
- Party: Nur Otan
- Education: Kostanay Agricultural Institute
- Occupation: Agronomist

Jeñıs Mirasūly Nūrğaliev (Note: Often transliterated as Zhenis Mirasovich Nurgaliyev through a Russified Romanization of Женис Мирасович Нургалиев.) (Kazakh: Жеңіс Мирасұлы Нұрғалиев; 9 May 1962 – 16 November 2024) was a Kazakh agronomist and politician. A member of Nur Otan, he served in the Senate from 2010 to 2023.

Nūrğaliev died on 16 November 2024, at the age of 62.
