= Edith Franke =

German politician (1942–2024)

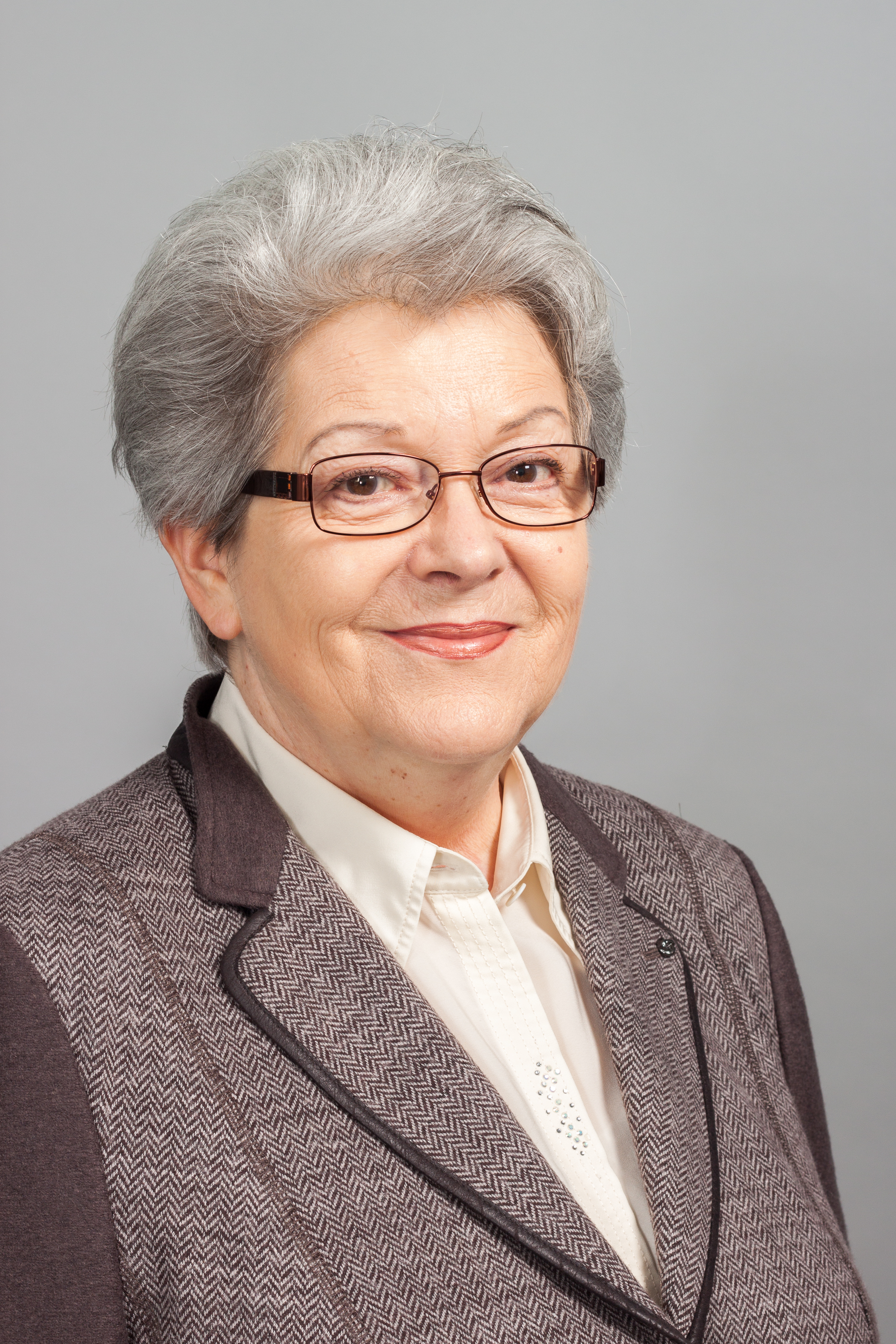
- Franke in 2013

Member of the Landtag of Saxony
- In office 29 September 2009 – 31 August 2014

Personal details
- Born: Edith Martha Hartkopf; 11 October 1942 Cottbus, Gau March of Brandenburg, Germany
- Died: 9 November 2024 (aged 82)
- Party: SED (until 1989); PED (1989–1990); Independent (1990–2024)
- Education: TU Dresden

Edith Martha Franke, (née Hartkopf; 11 October 1942 – 9 November 2024) was a German politician. A member of the Socialist Unity Party and the Party of Democratic Socialism before becoming an independent, she served in the Landtag of Saxony from 2009 to 2014.

Franke died on 9 November 2024, at the age of 82.
