= Valeria Narbikova =

Russian writer (1958–2024)

- Валерия Нарбикова
- Born: Valeria Spartakovna Narbikova; 24 February 1958; Moscow, Russian SFSR, USSR
- Died: 9 November 2024 (aged 66)
- Education: Maxim Gorky Literature Institute
- Occupation: Writer

Valeria Spartakovna Narbikova (Russian: Валерия Спартаковна Нарбикова; 24 February 1958 – 9 November 2024) was a Russian writer.

A member of PEN International from 1990 and of the Union of Writers of Russia from 1991, she wrote numerous works on number and prose.

== Biography ==
Born in Moscow on 24 February 1958, Narbikova graduated from the Maxim Gorky Literature Institute. She began publishing her first works in the final years of the Soviet Union, though she had been writing poems since 1978. Her works were praised by famed writer Andrei Bitov. She was often credited with writing a form of "alternative prose".

Valeria Narbikova died on 9 November 2024, at the age of 66.

== Publications ==
- Échos (1991)
- Day Equals Night (1992)
- In the Here and There (1992)
- Wettlauf. Lauf (1999)
