= William S. Crismore =

American politician (1933–2024)

Member of the Montana Senate from the 41st district
- In office 1995–2003

Personal details
- Born: William Samuel Crismore; May 9, 1933 Camas, Montana, U.S.
- Died: November 16, 2024 (aged 91) Libby, Montana, U.S.
- Party: Republican

William Samuel Crismore (May 9, 1933 – November 16, 2024) was an American politician. A member of the Republican Party, he served in the Montana Senate from 1995 to 2003.

== Life and career ==
Crismore was born in Camas, Montana, the son of William Sr. and Sarah Crismore. He attended Hot Springs High School, graduating in 1952. After graduating, he served in the armed forces during the Korean War.

Crismore served in the Montana Senate from 1995 to 2003, representing the 41st district.

== Death ==
Crismore died on November 16, 2024, at his home in Libby, Montana at the age of 91.
