= Fedde Jonkman =

Dutch politician (1941–2024)

- Born: 28 April 1941; Akmarijp, German-occupied Netherlands
- Died: November 2024 (aged 83)
- Occupation: Politician

Fedde Jonkman (28 April 1941 – November 2024) was a Dutch politician. He was a member of the Anti-Revolutionary Party (ARP) and Christian Democratic Appeal (CDA). He was the mayor of Rijnsburg (1985–1997) and the mayor of Waddinxveen (1997–2004).

Jonkman died in November 2024, at the age of 83.
