= Raymond Maffiolo =

Swiss footballer (1938–2024)

- Maffiolo with Servette in 1962

Personal information
- Date of birth: 6 March 1938
- Place of birth: Geneva, Switzerland
- Date of death: 28 November 2024 (aged 86)
- Position: Right-back

Senior career*
Years	Team	Apps	(Gls)
1955–1970	Servette	321	(8)

International career
1963–1965	Switzerland	7	(0)
- * Club domestic league appearances and goals

Raymond Maffiolo (6 March 1938 – 28 November 2024) was a Swiss footballer who played as a right-back. He made seven appearances for the Switzerland national team from 1963 to 1965. Maffiolo died on 28 November 2024, at the age of 86.
