= Ana Maria Lajusticia =

Spanish biochemist (1924–2024)

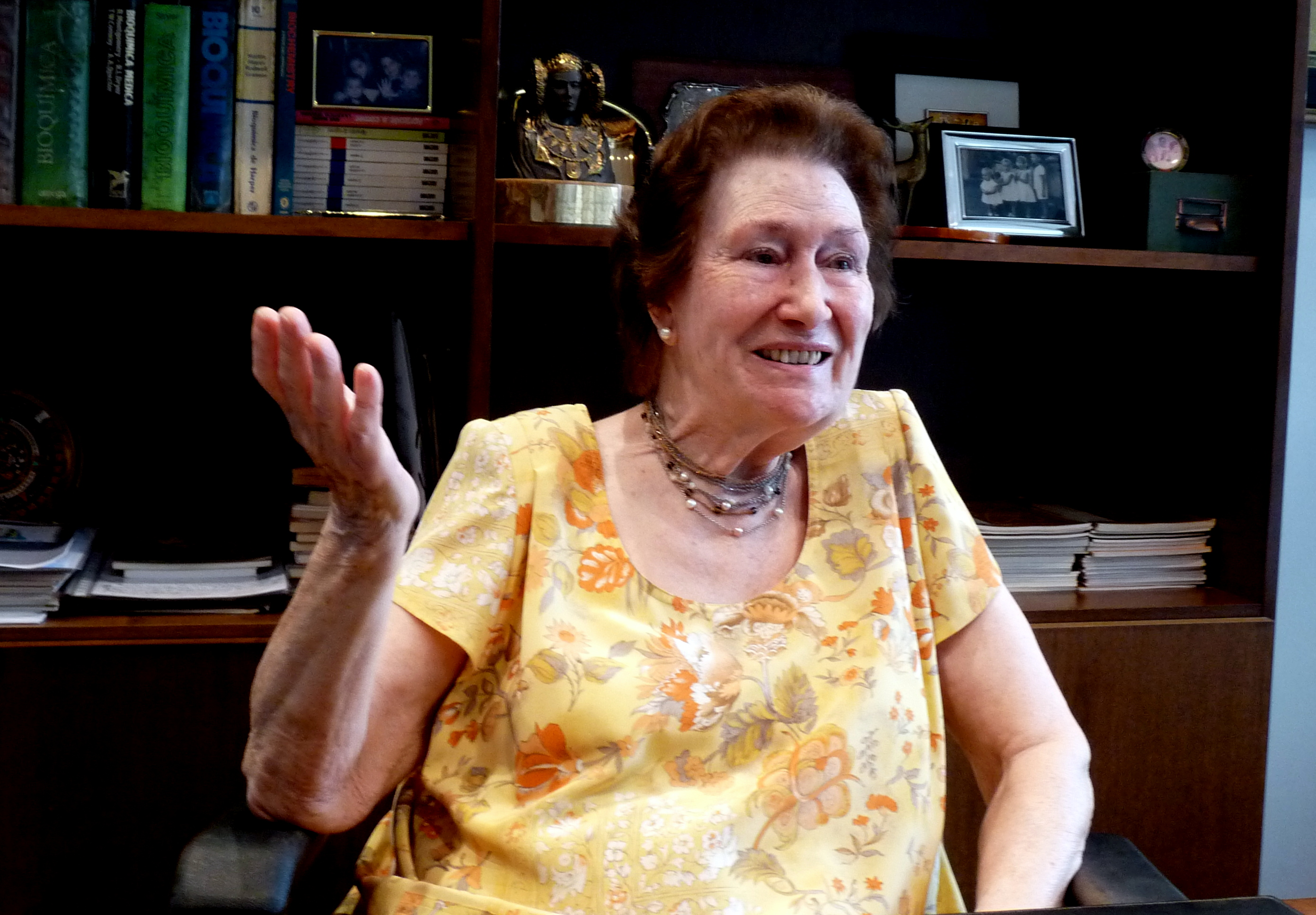
- Born: 26 July 1924
- Died: 7 November 2024 (aged 100)
- Occupations: Biochemist; Nutritionist

Ana Maria Lajusticia (26 July 1924 – 7 November 2024) was a Spanish biochemist and nutritionist. She died on 7 November 2024, at the age of 100.
