= Gurjant Singh (politician) =

Indian politician (died 2024)

Member of the Rajasthan Legislative Assembly
- Incumbent
- Assumed office 2013
- Constituency: Sadulshahar Assembly constituency

Personal details
- Died: 3 November 2024
- Party: Bharatiya Janata Party
- Occupation: Politician

Gurjant Singh (died 3 November 2024) was an Indian politician. He was elected to the 14th Rajasthan Legislative Assembly from Sadulshahar. He was a member of the Bharatiya Janata Party.

== Political career ==
Gurjant Singh began his political career as the director of the Purchase-Sale Cooperative Society. He held multiple roles, including membership on the Agricultural Marketing Board in Jaipur and chairmanship of the Krishi Upaj Mandi Samiti in Sri Ganganagar. He also served as Pradhan of the Panchayat Samiti in Sadulshahar and director of the Central Cooperative Bank Limited in Sri Ganganagar.

He was affiliated with the Bharatiya Janata Party. He served in multiple capacities, including as a director of the National Agricultural Cooperative Marketing Federation of India (NAFED). He was elected as a Member of the Legislative Assembly (MLA) three times: from the Sangaria Assembly constituency in 1993 and 2003, and from Sadulshahar Assembly constituency in 2013. During his tenure, he also held the position of Minister of State for Irrigation in the Government of Rajasthan.

== Death ==
Gurjant Singh died on 3 November 2024, at the age of 91, following a prolonged illness.
