= Mike C. Frietze Jr. =

American politician (1927–2024)

Member of the New Mexico House of Representatives
- In office January 1965 – October 1965

Personal details
- Born: Miguel C. Frieze Jr. September 16, 1927 Mesilla, New Mexico, U.S.
- Died: November 18, 2024 (aged 97) Las Cruces, New Mexico, U.S.
- Party: Democratic

Miguel C. Frietze Jr. (September 16, 1927 – November 18, 2024) was an American politician. A member of the Democratic Party, he served in the New Mexico House of Representatives in 1965.

== Life and career ==
Frietze was born in Mesilla, New Mexico, the son of Miguel Saenz Frietze and Arcadia Cajen. He attended Las Cruces Union High School. He served in the United States Navy from 1945 to 1949.

Frietze served as clerk of Doña Ana County, New Mexico from 1961 to 1964. He then served in the New Mexico House of Representatives from January 1965, until his resignation in October 1965, having been named county manager of Doña Ana County, a position he filled until 1969.

== Death ==
Frietze died on November 18, 2024, in Las Cruces, New Mexico, at the age of 97.
