= Harald Holz =

German philosopher (1930–2024)

Harald Holz (14 May 1930 – 8 November 2024) was a German philosopher, logician, mathematician (autodidact), poet and novelist.

== Life and career ==
Holz studied philosophy from 1953 to 1957 in Pullach im Isartal/Germany (lic. phil. schol.) and from 1959 until 1961 Catholic Theology at the Johann Wolfgang Goethe University Frankfurt/Germany (bac. theol.). He continued his study of philosophy at the Rheinische Friedrich-Wilhelms University Bonn/Germany. There he received his research doctorate in 1964 with Gottfried Martin with the thesis Transcendental philosophy and metaphysics.

Since 1964 he was assistant professor at the Institute of Philosophy at Ruhr University Bochum/Germany. In 1969 he published his Second Book with the university entitled Speculation and Facticity. On middle-aged and late Schelling's concept of freedom. Since 1971 he was Research Associate and Professor with Ruhr University Bochum. Since 1976 he was Chair Professor and Director of the Institute of Fundamental Philosophical-Theological Questions at the Westfalian Wilhelm University Münster/Germany. In 1979 and 1983 he was visiting scholar at George Washington University in Washington D.C. Further, he was director, together with E. Wolf-Gazo, implementing the first International Congress on the Philosophy of A. North Whitehead 1981 at the University of Bonn, then director of the congress: ‘Kant in the Hispanidad’, together with J. E. Dotti and H. Radermacher 1983 at the university of Cologne, and further director, together with H. Radermacher and A. Engstler, of the congress: ‘The liberation of Hispano-America, Philosophical contexts’ 1984 at the university at Münster/Westfalia.

Holz died on 8 November 2024, at the age of 94.

== Philosophy ==
As a systematic basic concept he replaces substance metaphysics totally by relation subsistence: Relationality is no longer an addition to existing concepts, but its reasoning and in the first place constitutes terminativity.
