= Jean Nallit =

French Resistance member (1923–2024)

Jean Nallit (14 September 1923 – 12 November 2024) was a French Resistance member. He was born in Lyon. On 16 April 1992, Yad Vashem awarded Nallit the title Righteous Among the Nations. He died on 12 November 2024, at the age of 101.
