= Paul Peters (politician, 1942–2024) =

Dutch politician (1942–2024)

Member of the Senate of the Netherlands
- In office 12 June 2007 – 7 June 2011

Personal details
- Born: Paul Willem Jacques Peters; 31 July 1942 Nijmegen, German-occupied Netherlands
- Died: 13 November 2024 (aged 82) Utrecht, Netherlands
- Party: SP
- Education: Utrecht University; Erasmus University Rotterdam
- Occupation: Academic

Paul Willem Jacques Peters (31 July 1942 – 13 November 2024) was a Dutch academic and politician. A member of the Socialist Party, he served in the Senate from 2007 to 2011.

Peters died in Utrecht on 13 November 2024, at the age of 82.
