= Kenneth R. Grant =

American politician (1941–2024)

Member of the New Hampshire House of Representatives from the Rockingham 17th district
- In office 1998–2000

Personal details
- Born: July 22, 1941 Trenton, New Jersey, U.S.
- Died: November 28, 2024 (aged 83) Atkinson, New Hampshire, U.S.
- Party: Republican
- Spouse: Carol Pancko (m. 1970; died. 2018)
- Education: New Jersey Institute of Technology

Kenneth R. Grant (July 22, 1941 – November 28, 2024) was an American politician. A member of the Republican Party, he served in the New Hampshire House of Representatives from 1998 to 2000.

== Life and career ==
Grant was born in Trenton, New Jersey, the son of Kenneth Grant Sr. and Marion Bien. He served in the United States Navy, which after his discharge, he attended New Jersey Institute of Technology, earning his B.S. degree in electrical engineering, which after earning his degree, he worked as an electrical engineer.

Grant served in the New Hampshire House of Representatives from 1998 to 2000.

== Death ==
Grant died on November 28, 2024, in Atkinson, New Hampshire, at the age of 83.
