= Hippolyte Piroux =

French farmer and writer (1929–2024)

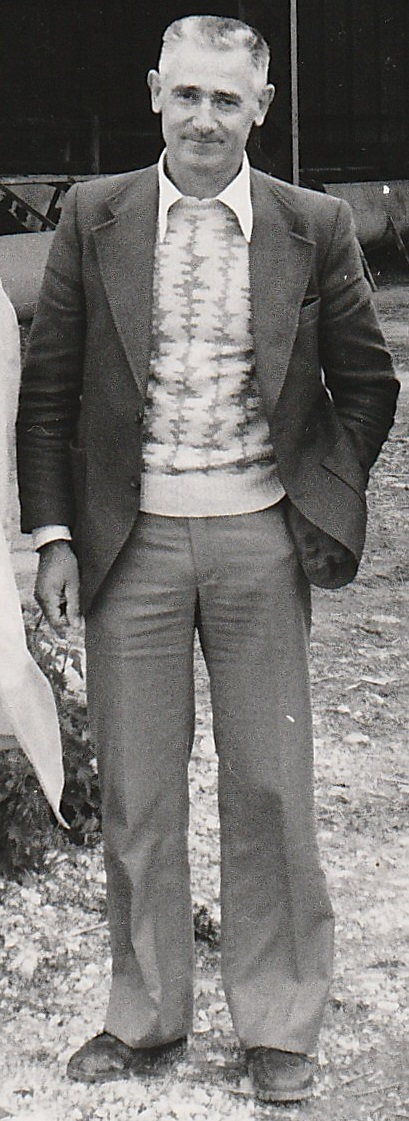
- Piroux in 1979
- Born: 8 November 1929; Polliat, France
- Died: 2 November 2024 (aged 94); Viriat, France
- Occupations: Farmer; Writer

Hippolyte Piroux (8 November 1929 – 2 November 2024) was a French farmer and writer.

== Biography ==
Born in Polliat on 8 November 1929, Piroux grew up in a peasant family. After his schooling, he became a farmer and later an agricultural technician. He notably designed the coat of arms for Polliat in 1979. After his retirement, he became a writer, publishing Les Prunes vertes. In 2011, he followed up with Le parler franco-provençal, a book on the Bressan dialect. In 2014, he published his first detective novel L'Affaire Reyssouzet-Machard. In 2017, he made his first appearance in the literary dictionary at the University of Tours.

Piroux died on 2 November 2024, at the age of 94.
