= Rudolf Trauner Jr. =

Austrian politician (1954–2024)

Member of the Landtag of Upper Austria
- In office 30 October 1991 – 30 October 1997

Personal details
- Born: 8 February 1954 Linz, Upper Austria, Austria
- Died: 9 November 2024 (aged 70)
- Party: ÖVP
- Education: Johannes Kepler University Linz
- Occupation: Businessman

Rudolf Trauner Jr. (8 February 1954 – 9 November 2024) was an Austrian businessman and politician. A member of the Austrian People's Party, he served in the Landtag of Upper Austria from 1991 to 1997.

Trauner died on 9 November 2024, at the age of 70.
