= Jim Earthman =

American politician (1934–2024)

Member of the Texas House of Representatives from the 22-6 district
- In office January 14, 1969 – January 12, 1971
- Preceded by: J. E. Johnson
- Succeeded by: Will Lee

Member of the Texas House of Representatives from the 22-5 district
- In office January 12, 1971 – January 9, 1973
- Preceded by: Bill Archer
- Succeeded by: District eliminated

Personal details
- Born: James Bradshaw Earthman III; September 21, 1934 Houston, Texas, U.S.
- Died: November 28, 2024 (aged 90) Galveston, Texas, U.S.
- Party: Republican
- Education: University of Texas at Austin; South Texas College of Law Houston

James Bradshaw Earthman III (September 21, 1934 – November 28, 2024) was an American politician. A member of the Republican Party, he served in the Texas House of Representatives from 1969 to 1973.

== Life and career ==
Earthman was born in Houston, Texas, the son of James Bradshaw Earthman II and Blanche Oneita Bastien. He attended the University of Texas at Austin, earning his BBA degree in banking and finance. He then attended South Texas College of Law Houston, earning his Juris Doctor degree.

Earthman served in the Texas House of Representatives from 1969 to 1973.

== Death ==
Earthman died on November 28, 2024 in Galveston, Texas, at the age of 90.
