= John Faria =

American politician (1937–2024)

Member of the Rhode Island Senate from the 45th district
- In office 1971–1973
- Preceded by: Joseph F. Bruno
- Succeeded by: Thomas DaPonte

Personal details
- Born: June 3, 1937 Bristol, Rhode Island, U.S.
- Died: November 20, 2024 (aged 87)
- Party: Democratic

John E. Faria (June 3, 1937 – November 20, 2024) was an American Democratic politician from Bristol, Rhode Island.

== Life and career ==
Born in Bristol, the son of Portuguese immigrants, Faria joined the U.S. Navy after graduating from high school. He was elected to the Bristol Town Council, serving from 1968 to 1971 and rising to council president. He was elected to the Rhode Island Senate in a 1971 special election to succeed fellow Democrat Joseph F. Bruno, who had resigned to unsuccessfully run for Bristol town administrator. He lost re-election the following year, having faced allegations of impropriety concerning a re-zoned parcel of land and a free vacation. He received a bachelor's degree in accounting from Roger Williams College in 1979, and went on to work for the Rhode Island Department of Administration for 19 years. He later served as a co-chair of the Bristol Tricentennial Celebration in 1980, as a member of the Bristol Housing Authority for 27 years, and as a member of the Bristol Democrat Town Committee for 19 years. He died November 20, 2024, at the age of 87.

== Electoral history ==
=== 1971 ===
Rhode Island Senate, District 45, 1971 special election * denotes incumbent Source:
Party	Candidate	Votes	%
Democratic	John Faria	2,339	52.6
Republican	Thomas DaPonte	2,106	47.4
Total votes		4,445	100

=== 1972 ===
Rhode Island Senate, District 45, 1972 election * denotes incumbent Source:
Party	Candidate	Votes	%
Republican	Thomas DaPonte	4,162	54.0
Democratic	John Faria*	3,547	46.0
Total votes		7,709	100
