= Michel Elkoubi =

French racing driver (1947–2024)

- Born: 19 February 1947; Casablanca, French protectorate in Morocco
- Died: November 2024 (aged 77) near Vannes, France
- Occupation: Racing driver

Michel Elkoubi (19 February 1947 – November 2024) was a French racing driver active in the 1970s. Twice, he participated in the 24 Hours of Le Mans. He failed to finish in the 1978 edition as a member of team Pronuptia with teammates Pierre Yver and Philippe Streiff. In 1979, he finished 21st with teammates Yver and Max Cohen-Olivar with team Lambretta. He always raced in a Lola T296.

Elkoubi died near Vannes in November 2024, at the age of 77.
