= Qi Zhengjun =

Chinese general (1924–2024)

- 齐正钧
- Born: January 1924; Wan County, Zhili, China
- Died: 30 November 2024 (aged 100); Nanjing, China
- Military career
- Allegiance: People's Republic of China
- Branch: People's Liberation Army Ground Force
- Service years: 1941–?
- Rank: Lieutenant general
- Conflicts: Chinese Civil War; Korean War
- Awards: Order of Independence and Freedom (3rd Class) Order of Liberation (3rd Class)

Chinese name
- Simplified Chinese: 齐正钧
- Traditional Chinese: 齊正鈞
Transcriptions
Standard Mandarin
- Hanyu Pinyin: Qí Zhèngjūn

Qi Zhengjun (Chinese: 齐正钧; January 1924 – 30 November 2024) was a lieutenant general in the People's Liberation Army of China.

== Biography ==
Qi was born in Wan County, Zhili (now Shunping County, Hebei), in January 1924. He joined the Chinese Communist Party (CCP) in 1938, and enlisted in the Eighth Route Army in 1941. He mainly served in the Shanxi-Chahar-Hebei Military Region and participated in the Pingjin campaign during the Chinese Civil War.

In 1950 in the Korean War, he was assigned to the North Korea as chief of the Operation Section of a division of the People's Volunteer Army. After the war, he successively served in the PLA Academy of Military Sciences, the Nanjing Military Region, the Nanjing Senior Army School, and the Army Command College of the Chinese People's Liberation Army. He attained the rank of lieutenant general (zhongjiang) in 1988.

Qi died in Nanjing on 30 November 2024, at the age of 100.
