= Michel Sy =

French politician (1930–2024)

Deputy of the French National Assembly for Paris's 25th constituency
- In office 10 June 1960 – 9 October 1962
- Preceded by: Jean Pécastaing
- Succeeded by: Alexandre Sanguinetti

Personal details
- Born: 26 September 1930 Les Ponts-de-Cé, France
- Died: November 2024 (aged 94)
- Party: CNIP; RPR
- Occupation: Researcher

Michel Sy (26 September 1930 – November 2024) was a French researcher and politician of the National Centre of Independents and Peasants (CNIP).

== Life and career ==
Born in Les Ponts-de-Cé on 26 September 1930, Sy was a founding member of the Front national des combattants. Following the death of Jean Pécastaing, he served in the National Assembly for Paris's 25th constituency from June 1960 to October 1962.

Sy died in November 2024, at the age of 94.
