= Joseph T. Maguire =

American politician (1926–2024)

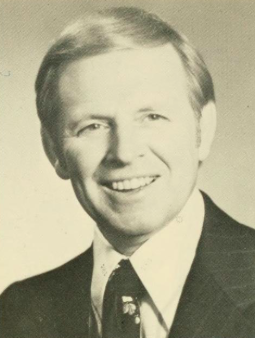
Image of Joseph T Maguire

Joseph T. Maguire (June 10, 1926 – November 7, 2024) was an American politician. He was a member of the Massachusetts House of Representatives from 1976 to 1978. Maguire died on November 7, 2024, at the age of 98.
