= Ruby Bute =

Saint Martinois artist (1943–2024)

- Born: Aruba
- Died: November 5, 2024 (aged 81)

Ruby Bute (13 January 1943 – 5 November 2024) was a Saint Martinois painter, storyteller and writer. From the island of Saint Martin, she became the first woman to publish a book there with her poetry collection Golden Voices of S'maatin in 1989. Bute has been referred to as "the first dame of St. Martin’s cultural arts."

== Early life and move to Saint Martin ==
Ruby Bute was born in 1943 in Aruba to parents from Sint Maarten. They had migrated to Aruba so her father could work as a fireman. As a young woman in Aruba, Bute married, had two children, and then divorced. Eventually her family, who had already moved back to Saint Martin, convinced her to join them there. After arriving on the island in 1976, she lived in Marigot, on the French half of Saint Martin. Over the years she lived and worked on both parts of the island before settling in Friar's Bay where, in 2009, she opened the Ruby Bute Silk Cotton Grove Art Gallery.

== Career ==
=== Painting ===
Bute began painting at a young age. She was mostly self-taught, so her work was sometimes referred to as folk art. After moving to Saint Martin, she began selling her paintings in shops on the island. She had her first solo show in 1983; it was thought to be the first one-woman exhibition in Saint Martin. Her paintings documented life and culture on the island in vibrant color. Bute taught painting to children at the John Larmonie Center in Philipsburg. She also taught art to prisoners and to tourists while they were vacationing on the island. She worked at the Department of Culture beginning in 1986, and was the first woman to organize after-school activities for children in the country's elementary schools. Ruby Bute worked out of a studio at her home in Friar's Bay, Saint Martin.

=== Writing ===
Bute's short stories and poetry focused on women's issues, particularly the lives of Afro-Caribbean women. Her first poetry collection, Golden Voices of S'maatin, was published by House of Nehesi Publishers in 1989. A second collection, Floral Bouquet to the Daughters of Eve, followed in 1995. Golden Voices of S'maatin is considered the first book published by a woman on Saint Martin. It was a bestseller on the island, selling out its first printing in about three months. Another collection, Reflections, was published in 2021.

== Recognition and death ==
Bute received a lifetime achievement award from the Collectivity of Saint Martin in 2004. She was honored by Queen Beatrix of the Netherlands in 2005. In 2019, her painting "185-Mile Winds," which depicts the aftermath of Hurricane Irma, was displayed in various official buildings in The Hague, including both houses of the Dutch legislature.

Bute died on 5 November 2024, at the age of 81. On her death, Saint Martin President Louis Mussington said the artist "will forever remain a cultural and spiritual icon of our island."

== Publications ==
Publications by Ruby Bute include:

- Golden voices of S'maatin, Philipsburg, St. Maarten, Caribbean : House of Nehesi, 1989. Introduction by Felix Choisy; illustrations by Mosera and Ruby Bute.
- Floral bouquets : to the daughters of Eve, San Francisco, California : Columbia Publishers, 1996. Short stories and poetry.
- with Peter de Ruiter: St. Maarten, Caribbean Promotion, [Den Haag], [Laval, distr.], 2004. Photos with impressions of the island Sint Maarten.
- Reflections, independently published, 2021.
