= Benedykt Suchecki =

Polish politician (1945–2024)

Member of the Sejm
- In office 19 October 2001 – 18 October 2005

Personal details
- Born: 13 April 1945 Karnice, Poland
- Died: 4 November 2024 (aged 79)
- Party: SLD
- Education: University of Silesia in Katowice
- Occupation: Government official

Benedykt Suchecki (13 April 1945 – 4 November 2024) was a Polish government official and politician. A member of the Democratic Left Alliance, he served in the Sejm from 2001 to 2005.

Suchecki died on 4 November 2024, at the age of 79.
