= Patricia H. Foss =

American politician (1925–2024)

Member of the New Hampshire House of Representatives from the Strafford 10th district
- In office 1984–1992

Personal details
- Born: Patricia Ellen Howland; November 29, 1925 Brattleboro, Vermont, U.S.
- Died: November 9, 2024 (aged 98) Strafford, New Hampshire, U.S.
- Party: Republican
- Spouse: James L. Foss
- Education: University of New Hampshire

Patricia Ellen Howland (November 29, 1925 – November 9, 2024) was an American politician. A member of the Republican Party, she served in the New Hampshire House of Representatives from 1984 to 1992.

== Life and career ==
Foss was born in Brattleboro, Vermont, the daughter of Walter Howland and Ruth Kipp. She attended and graduated from Spaulding High School. After graduating, she attended the University of New Hampshire. She worked in the United States Navy's sylvania plant in Dover, New Hampshire during World War II.

Foss served in the New Hampshire House of Representatives from 1984 to 1992.

== Death ==
Foss died on November 9, 2024, in Strafford, New Hampshire, at the age of 98.
