= John LaBarge =

American politician (1952–2024)

John V. LaBarge (January 20, 1952 – November 10, 2024) was an American politician. He was a member of the Vermont House of Representatives from 1993 to 2003. LaBarge died on November 10, 2024, at the age of 72.
