= João Omar Macagnan =

Brazilian politician (1943–2024)

Mayor of Itajaí
- In office 1 January 1989 – 31 December 1992
- Preceded by: Arnaldo Schmitt Júnior
- Succeeded by: Arnaldo Schmitt Júnior

Member of the Legislative Assembly of Santa Catarina
- In office 1 February 1987 – 31 December 1988
- In office 1 February 1999 – 31 January 2003

Personal details
- Born: 3 September 1943 Água Doce, Santa Catarina, Brazil
- Died: 10 November 2024 (aged 81) Itajaí, Santa Catarina, Brazil
- Party: PMDB
- Education: Universidade do Vale do Itajaí
- Occupation: Lawyer

João Omar Macagnan (3 September 1943 – 10 November 2024) was a Brazilian lawyer and politician. A member of the Brazilian Democratic Movement Party, he served as mayor of Itajaí from 1989 to 1992 and was a member of the Legislative Assembly of Santa Catarina from 1987 to 1988 and from 1999 to 2003.

Macagnan died in Itajaí on 10 November 2024, at the age of 81.
