= 2024 in Turkey =

- Centuries: 20th; 21st
- Decades: 2000s; 2010s; 2020s; 2030s
- See also: List of years in Turkey

Individuals and events related to 2024 in Turkey.

== Incumbents ==
Office	Image	Name	Tenure / Current length
President		Recep Tayyip Erdoğan	28 August 2014 (12 years ago)
Vice President of Turkey		Cevdet Yılmaz	4 June 2023 (3 years ago)
30th Speaker of the Grand National Assembly		Numan Kurtulmuş	27 June 2023 (3 years ago)
President of the Constitutional Court		Zühtü Arslan	10 February 2015 (11 years ago)
Minister of National Defense		Yaşar Güler	4 June 2023 (3 years ago)
Chief of the Turkish General Staff		Metin Gürak	3 August 2023 (3 years ago)

== Events ==
=== Ongoing ===
- Purges in Turkey (2016–present)

=== January ===
- 1 January – Torture and killing of Eros by İbrahim Keloğlan. Keloğlan's subsequent legal proceedings would spark protests across the country.
- 13 January – Turkey launches airstrikes against Kurdish militants in Iraq and Syria following an attack on Turkish soldiers in Iraq which killed nine.
- 23 January – The Grand National Assembly of Turkey approves Sweden's NATO membership bid.
- 25 January – President Recep Tayyip Erdoğan signs and approves the proposal containing Sweden's accession protocol to NATO.
- 28 January – 2024 Istanbul church shooting: One person is killed and another is injured during a shooting by two gunmen at the Church of Santa Maria in Istanbul.

=== February ===
- 1 February – A gunman takes seven hostages at a factory owned by U.S. company Procter & Gamble in Gebze, Kocaeli Province, in an apparent protest against the Gaza war. The perpetrator is later arrested unharmed and all the hostages are freed.
- 6 February – Two Revolutionary People's Liberation Party/Front gunmen open fire outside the Istanbul Justice Palace, wounding six people, before being killed during a shootout with police.
- 10 February – Gunmen open fire at a campaign event in the Küçükçekmece district municipality of Istanbul for AK Party mayoral candidate Aziz Yeniay, critically injuring one person. Seventeen people are arrested in connection with the attack.
- 13 February – Nine miners are killed after a landslide near the Çöpler mine in İliç, Erzincan Province.
- 25 February – Turkey launches an airstrike in northern Iraq, killing four alleged PKK members.

=== March ===
- 5 March – One person is killed in Bursa Province following a magnitude 4.9 earthquake that had its epicenter in Çanakkale Province.
- 15 March – A migrant boat sinks near Gökçeada in the Aegean Sea, killing 22 people including seven children. Two people are rescued by the Turkish Coast Guard off Eceabat, Çanakkale Province while two others manage to swim to shore.
- 20–21 March – 2024 World Athletics Race Walking Team Championships at Antalya
- 31 March –
  - 2024 Turkish local elections
  - 2024 Istanbul mayoral election: Ekrem İmamoğlu is re-elected as mayor of Istanbul.

=== April ===
- 2 April:
  - Gayrettepe nightclub fire – A fire at a nightclub in Beşiktaş, Istanbul kills at least 29 people.
  - Authorities annul the victory of DEM candidate Abdullah Zeydan in the mayoral election in Van and declare his rival from the AK Party the winner instead. Following public uproar and an appeal from Zeydan, the Supreme Election Board reinstates him as the winner.
- 12 April - One person is killed and seven others are injured after a cable car falls on rocky ground due to a collapsed pylon outside Antalya. The accident also leaves 184 people stranded across the entire cable car system.
- 18 April - A magnitude 5.6 earthquake hits Tokat Province, destroying several buildings there and in neighboring Yozgat Province.

=== May ===
- 2 May – Turkey suspends all trade with Israel in response to their conduct in the war in Gaza, after previously suspending exports in a limited category of goods in April.
- 6 May:
  - The Turkish Air Force carries out airstrikes on Iraqi Kurdistan, reportedly killing 16 PKK insurgents.
  - The Byzantine-era Chora church in Istanbul formally reopens to Muslim worshippers as a mosque.
- 7 May – The Girls' Trial is a trial in Türkiye in which 41 defendants, including minors, are accused of ordinary religious and social activities linked to the Gülen movement.
- 9 May – A Boeing 737 passenger aircraft belonging to Corendon Airlines makes an emergency landing at Gazipaşa–Alanya Airport after one of its tires bursts.
- 13 May – President Erdoğan meets with Greek Prime Minister Kyriakos Mitsotakis in Ankara.
- 17 May – President Erdoğan issues pardons to seven senior military officers who were sentenced to life imprisonment in 2018 for their role in the 1997 Turkish military memorandum that ousted Prime Minister Necmettin Erbakan.
- 26 May - Ten people are killed and 39 others are injured after a bus collides with three other vehicles in the Tarsus district near Mersin.
- 31 May – Turkey launches drone strikes on Syrian Democratic Forces targets in Qamishli, Syria, killing four militants and injuring 11 civilians.

=== June ===
- 2 June - One person is killed and eight others are injured after an apartment building collapses in Küçükçekmece, Istanbul.
- 3 June - Mehmet Sıddık Akış, the DEM mayor of Hakkâri, is removed from office and arrested on suspicion of having links with the PKK. He is sentenced to 19 years' imprisonment over the charges on 5 June.
- 4 June - An SF-260D trainer aircraft of the Turkish Air Force crashes into farmland near Kayseri, killing its two pilots.
- 21 June - 2024 Turkey wildfires – A crop fire in the border between Mardin and Diyarbakır Provinces leaves 11 people dead and ravages three settlements.
- 28 June - The Financial Action Task Force removes Turkey from its "gray list" of countries not fully complying with measures to combat money laundering and terrorism financing.
- 29 June to 7 July – 2024 FIBA Under-17 Basketball World Cup
- 30 June:
  - Five people are killed after a propane tank explodes inside a restaurant in İzmir.
  - A riot targeting Syrian refugees in Melikgazi, Kayseri Province, leads to the arrest of 67 people.

=== July ===
- 1 July – Seven people are killed after anti-Turkish protests break out in Turkish-occupied Northern Syria following anti-Syrian riots in Turkey a day earlier.
- 4 July – Germany summons Turkey's ambassador in Berlin in a tit-for-tat move over footballer Merih Demiral's wolf salute gesture while celebrating a goal at the UEFA Euro 2024.
- 9 July – A life raft carrying migrants bound for Europe sinks off the coast of Çeşme after being reportedly pushed back by Greek authorities, killing seven people.
- 29 July – The Grand National Assembly of Turkey approves a law aiming to euthanize a portion of the country's four million stray dogs, specifically targeting those that are sick or deemed aggressive.
- 30 July –
  - The Turkish defense ministry says that it targeted Kurdish militants in northern Iraq with air strikes, killing 13 people.
  - Turkey and Armenia resume talks aimed at normalizing diplomatic relations and agree to simplify visa rules for some passport holders.

=== August ===
- 1 August – 2024 American–Russian prisoner exchange: Twenty-six individuals are released from Ankara Esenboğa Airport in a prisoner exchange between the United States and Russia.
- 2 August – Turkey blocks internet access to Instagram, following comments made by presidential communications director Fahrettin Altun that condemned Meta Platforms for taking down Instagram posts offering condolences or expressing sorrow towards the assassination of Hamas political leader Ismail Haniyeh. The blockage is lifted on 10 August.
- 7 August – Turkey files a petition at the International Court of Justice to join the South African-led lawsuit against Israel over genocide charges in the Gaza war.
- 9 August – An intercity bus traveling from İzmir to Ağrı crashes into an overpass pillar in Polatlı, Ankara Province, killing nine people and injuring 26 others.
- 12 August – At least five people are injured in a knife attack at a mosque in Eskişehir. An 18-year old suspect is arrested.
- 16 August – A brawl breaks out at the Grand National Assembly during a debate regarding the eligibility of imprisoned MP Can Atalay to assume his seat.
- 18 August:
  - At least 26 people are reported injured following days of wildfires in the İzmir area.
  - An Israeli businessman of Palestinian origin is killed in a gun attack in Kağıthane municipality of Istanbul.
- 28 August – One person is killed and 38 others are injured, two of them seriously, when two Metrobus vehicles collide in Küçükçekmece, Istanbul.
- 30 August – The Turkish Military Academy sees women cadets become valedictorians of the three service branches of the Turkish Armed Forces for the first time. However, an investigation is subsequently launched after around 400 cadets were found to have taken an unauthorized secularist oath at their graduation ceremony.

=== September ===
- 2 September –
  - Turkey formally applies to join the BRICS geopolitical bloc, citing the lack of progress in its accession to the European Union.
  - Fifteen members of the Youth Union of Turkey are arrested on suspicion of assaulting two US Navy personnel in Izmir.
- 5 September – A Turkish drone strike kills three people, including a child, in Iraqi Kurdistan one day after a similar attack on a car in the region killed three people from the same family.
- 6 September – Vistara Airlines Flight VTI027 going from Mumbai to Frankfurt makes an emergency landing at Erzurum Airport after receiving a bomb threat that turns out negative.
- 9 September – The Turkish Ministry of Defense announces that a Turkish soldier was killed in clashes with the PKK in northern Iraq.

=== October ===
- 16 October –
  - Açık Radyo makes its final broadcast following a shutdown order from the Radio and Television Supreme Council on grounds of allegedly inciting hatred following comments made by a guest on the Armenian Genocide.
  - A magnitude 5.9 earthquake hits Kale, Malatya, injuring at least 40 people across the east of the country.
- 17 October – A bus carrying Japanese tourists crashes into a ditch in Afyonkarahisar Province, injuring 22 people.
- 18 October – A bus overturns in Aksaray Province, killing six people and injuring 25 others.
- 20 October – Fethullah Gülen, the founder of the Gülen movement, died in the United States.
- 23 October – Five people are killed while 22 others are injured in a gun and bomb attack on the headquarters of Turkish Aerospace Industries in Kahramankazan, Ankara Province that is blamed on the PKK. The two attackers are also killed.
- 30 October – Ahmet Özer, the CHP mayor of Esenyurt, Istanbul Province, is arrested on suspicion of having links with the PKK.

=== November ===
- 4 November – The DEM mayors of Batman, Mardin and Halfeti are dismissed on suspicion of having links with the PKK.
- 5 November – At least 12 people are injured in an explosion and fire at an oil refinery of Tüpraş in Izmit.
- 11 November – Former MKE Ankaragücü president Faruk Koca is convicted and sentenced to 3.5 years' imprisonment by a court in Ankara for assaulting a referee during a Süper Lig game in 2023.
- 22 November – The DEM mayors of Tunceli and Ovacik are dismissed on suspicion of having links with the PKK.
- 24 November – The engine of a Sukhoi Superjet 100 aircraft operated by Azimuth catches fire shortly after landing in Antalya Airport from Sochi. All 95 passengers and crew on board are evacuated without injury.

=== December ===
- 9 December – Two military helicopters collide over Isparta Province, killing six personnel including a brigadier general.
- 22 December – An ambulance helicopter crashes shortly after takeoff from a hospital in Muğla, killing all four people on board including two medical workers.
- 24 December – Eleven people are killed in an explosion at a factory producing explosives in Karesi, Balıkesir.
- 25 December – The owner of the Grand Isias Hotel in Adiyaman is convicted along with his son and an architect for manslaughter charges relating to the deaths of 72 people in the collapse of the hotel during the 2023 Turkey–Syria earthquakes and sentenced to more than 18 years' imprisonment.

== Holidays ==
- 1 January – New Year's Day
- 10 April to 12 April – Ramazan Bayramı
- 23 April – Children's Day
- 1 May – Labour Day
- 19 May – Youth and Sports Day
- 16 June to 19 June – Kurban Bayramı
- 15 July – Democracy and National Unity Day
- 30 August – Victory Day
- 29 October – Republic Day

== Arts and entertainment ==
- List of Turkish films of 2024
- List of 2024 box office number-one films in Turkey
- List of Turkish submissions for the Academy Award for Best International Feature Film
- List of Turkish European Film Award winners and nominees

== Deaths ==
- 4 January – Ayla Algan, 86, singer and actress (The House of Leyla, O Hayat Benim, Binbir Gece).
- 13 January – Mehmet Eymür, 80, intelligence official.
- 24 January – Ayşe Işıl Karakaş, 65, academic and judge.
- 31 January – Mario Levi, 66, novelist, journalist and scholar.
- 2 February – Alev Alatlı, 79, columnist, novelist, academician and economist.
- 11 February:
  - Füruzan, 91, writer.
  - Yılmaz Karakoyunlu, 87, writer and politician.
- 21 February – Altuğ Çinici, 89, architect.
- 1 March – Ataullah Hamidi, 69, farmer and politician.
- 19 March – Ersen Martin, 44, footballer.
- 2 April – Türker İnanoğlu, 87, screenwriter, film director and producer.
- 15 April – Mehmet Coral, 77, novelist.
- 14 May – Ayten Gökçer, 84, actress.
- 11 June – Victoria, 39, Czech singer.
- 26 June – Yaşar Yakış, 85, politician.
- 1 July – Nilüfer Gürsoy, 103, philologist, politician and memoirist.
- 31 July – Genco Erkal, 86, actor.
- 15 August – Tarık Ziya Ekinci, 99, politician and physician.
- 17 August – Aydemir Akbaş, 88, screenwriter, director, actor, journalist and sports writer.
- 8 September – İlkan Karaman, 34, basketball player.
- 23 September – Tomris Giritlioğlu, 67, ilm director and producer.
- 27 September – Fazile Hanımsultan, 83, Egyptian and Ottoman princess.
- 7 October:
  - Recai Kutan, 94, politician.
  - Üner Teoman, 91, sprinter.
- 18 October – Emin Fuat Keyman, 65, academic and political scientist.
- 20 October – Fethullah Gülen, 83, Islamic preacher.
- 24 October – Sabahattin Çakmakoğlu, 93, bureaucrat and politician.
- 7 November – Selçuk Ayhan, 71, mechanical engineer and politician.
- 17 November:
  - Muazzez İlmiye Çığ, 110, librarian and writer.
  - Münci Kalayoğlu, 84, doctor.
- 19 November – Beyza Bilgin, 89, theology professor.
- 2 December – Ömer Barutçu, 82, economist and politician.
- 8 December – Şerif Gören, 80, film director.
- 15 December – Ankaralı Turgut, 61, singer.
- 20 December – Turgut Toydemir, 86, architect.
- 31 December – Nahit Menteşe, 92, politician.

== See also ==
- Outline of Turkey
- Index of Turkey-related articles
- List of Turkey-related topics
- History of Turkey
- Other events in 2024
