= 2026 in Turkey =

- Centuries: 20th; 21st
- Decades: 2000s; 2010s; 2020s; 2030s
- See also: List of years in Turkey

Individuals and events related to 2026 in Turkey.

== Incumbents ==
Office	Image	Name	Tenure / Current length
President		Recep Tayyip Erdoğan	28 August 2014 (12 years ago)
Vice President of Turkey		Cevdet Yılmaz	4 June 2023 (3 years ago)
30th Speaker of the Grand National Assembly		Numan Kurtulmuş	27 June 2023 (3 years ago)
President of the Constitutional Court		Zühtü Arslan	10 February 2015 (11 years ago)
Minister of National Defense		Yaşar Güler	4 June 2023 (3 years ago)
Chief of the Turkish General Staff		Metin Gürak	3 August 2023 (3 years ago)

== Events ==
=== Ongoing ===
- Purges in Turkey (2016–present)
- Turkish protests (2025–present)

=== January ===
- 13 January – A judge is shot and injured by her former partner, a public prosecutor, inside a courthouse in Kartal, Istanbul. The gunman is arrested.
- 21 January – Zeynep Sönmez becomes the first Turkish tennis player to reach the third round in singles at the Australian Open tennis tournament.
- 22 January – Authorities announce the discovery in Istanbul of the body of a Russian swimmer who disappeared while competing in the 2025 Bosphorus Cross Continental Swim in August.
- 27 January – Authorities announce the arrest of six people across five provinces on suspicion of spying for Iran.
- 29 January – The Turkish Football Federation issues a fine of 802,500 lira ($18,500) on Diyarbakır-based club Amed S.F.K. and suspends its president, Nahit Eren, on charges of "making ideological propaganda" after the club uploads a video of a woman having her hair braided amid similar acts by Kurds in protests against the 2026 northeastern Syria offensive.

=== February ===
- 1 February – A bus falls off a highway embankment in Döşemealtı, Antalya Province, killing nine people and injuring 21 others.
- 10 February – The Beşiktaş district government in Istanbul bans scheduled concerts by rock bands Slaughter to Prevail and Behemoth following accusations of satanism by Islamist groups.
- 11 February – A brawl breaks out in the Grand National Assembly over the appointment of Akın Gürlek as justice minister.
- 19 February – Journalist Alican Uludag is arrested in Ankara on charges of insulting president Erdoğan on social media.
- 20 February – Turkey and Saudi Arabia sign an agreement to strengthen bilateral investments in the solar energy sector.
- 25 February – An F-16 fighter jet of the Turkish Air Force crashes shortly after takeoff near a section of Otoyol 5 in Balıkesir, killing the pilot.

=== March ===
- 2 March – The Çekmeköy school stabbing occurs, where a 17-year-old student stabbed two teachers and another student.
- 4 March – An Iranian ballistic missile is intercepted by NATO air defenses over Hatay Province.
- 9 March –
  - A boat carrying migrants collides with a Turkish Coast Guard vessel off Demre, Antalya Province, killing 14 passengers.
  - Turkey and NATO forces shoot down an Iranian ballistic missile violating Turkish airspace over Gaziantep Province.
  - The United States reaches a deferred prosecution agreement with Turkey's state-owned lender Halkbank to resolve criminal charges alleging that the bank helped Iran evade U.S. sanctions. Under the agreement, Halkbank must implement compliance monitoring and avoid transactions that benefit Iran, after which the charges may be dismissed pending court approval.
- 13 March – Turkey intercepts an Iranian ballistic missile violating its airspace.
- 18 March – Iraq reaches a deal with Turkey and the Kurdistan Region to resume oil exports through the Kirkuk–Ceyhan Oil Pipeline.
- 22 March – One person is killed and 10 others are injured, including one critically, when a natural gas explosion collapses two residential buildings in Fatih, Istanbul.

=== April ===
- 7 April – Three gunmen open fire on police outside the building housing the Israeli consulate in Istanbul, resulting in a shootout that leaves one of the attackers dead and the other two injured. Two police officers are also injured.
- 14 April – Sixteen people are injured in a school shooting in Siverek, Şanlıurfa Province. The 19-year old perpetrator dies by suicide.
- 15 April – Twelve people are killed in a school shooting in Kahramanmaraş. The 14-year old perpetrator is also killed.
- 20 April – Eight people are sentenced to up to 7.5 years' imprisonment for the plunging of a cable car on Tünek Tepe in 2024 that killed one person.

=== May ===
- 5 May – The European Court of Human Rights, in the case of Yasak v. Türkiye, rules that Article 7 and Article 3 of the European Convention on Human Rights had been violated.
- 13 May –
  - Turkey lifts restrictions on direct trade with Armenia.
  - Authorities arrest 324 suspects linked to Islamic State following operations in 47 provinces.
- 18 May – Six people are killed in a series of shootings carried out by the same person in Tarsus.
- 20 May –
  - A magnitude 5.6 earthquake hits Malatya Province, injuring 74 people.
  - 2026 UEFA Europa League final
- 21 May –
  - Three people are killed following floods in Hatay Province.
  - An appeals court in Ankara annuls the results of the CHP's 2023 congress, effectively removing Özgür Özel as party chairman in favor of Kemal Kılıçdaroğlu.
- 31 May – A bus crashes into highway barriers and catches fire in Denizli Province, killing eight people and injuring 33 others.

=== June ===
- 5 June – The Turkish-flagged fishing boat Duru 67 is attacked and sunk in the Black Sea off Sevastopol, killing one sailor and injuring four others.
- 11 June–19 July – Turkey participates at the 2026 FIFA World Cup
- 23 June – At least 209 people are arrested in raids by security forces across Ankara ahead of the 2026 Ankara NATO summit.

=== July ===
- 3 July — A court in Istanbul imprisons comedian Deniz Göktaş for insulting President Erdoğan and religious principles.
- 7—8 July — 2026 Ankara NATO summit
- 18 July – A magnitude 5.0 earthquake hits Malatya Province, injuring 32 people.
- 24 July – The United States imposes a 12.5% tariff on Turkey, citing the presence of alleged forced labor in the supply chain.

=== August ===
- 1 August – Iraq signs a one-year exportation agreement with Turkey to export 750 thousand barrels of petroleum through the Ceyhan pipeline.
- 7 August – Saudi Arabia, Pakistan, and Turkey sign a joint defense agreement.
- 11 August – Turkey passes legislation providing thousands of PKK operatives a conditional amnesty once the PKK fully relinquishes its weapons.
- 13 August – An F-16 Fighting Falcon of the Turkish Air Force crashes in Yalova Province. The pilot ejects safely.
- 21 August – An international arrest warrant for Israeli Prime Minister Benjamin Netanyahu is issued by Turkey over the interception of the Gaza Freedom Flotilla.
- 21 August–6 September – 2026 Women's European Volleyball Championship in Azerbaijan, Czech Republic, Sweden and Turkey.

=== September ===
- 4 September – The US Treasury announces that it has cut off Turkish investment bank Golden Global Yatirim Bankasi Anonim Sirketi and two subsidiaries from dollar transactions because of their dealings with the Iranian regime.
- 13 September – Widespread raids are conducted on LGBTQ bars, activists’ houses and HIV support groups as part of a crackdown announced by President Erdoğan.
- 19 September – Turkey revokes Bank Mellat's operating license amid the US-led economic isolation campaign against Iran.
- 22 September – Eleven students are injured in a school shooting in Turgutlu, Manisa Province.
- 24 September –
  - Turkey agrees to gradually transfer Bashiqa base to Iraq.
  - A magnitude 5.4 earthquake hits Şanlıurfa Province, injuring 40 people.
- 27 September – Israeli Prime Minister Benjamin Netanyahu orders the drafting of an ICC case against President Erdogan, citing Turkey's alleged persecution of Kurdish minorities and the Turkish government's alleged financial assistance for Hamas.
- 28 September –
  - A court in Istanbul sentences comedian Deniz Göktaş to just over 19 months imprisonment for "insulting" President Erdogan.
  - A 41-year-old man fatally shoots his uncle at a high school in Osmaniye.
- 29 September – The chair of the Turkish Football Federation's central referee board, Ferhat Gündoğdu, is detained along with six others as part of a police investigation into corruption.

=== October ===
- 6 October – Eight girls are stabbed, one of them fatally, at a middle school in Istanbul.
- 8 October –
  - PKK militants withdraw from four sites in northern Iraq as part of a peace initiative with Turkey.
  - Two people are killed and at least two more are trapped after a partial collapse of a seven-story building in Istanbul.
- 11 October – A tour bus and a truck collide in Akhisar, killing 11 people and injuring 27 others.
- 14 October –
  - The pro-opposition Halk TV's live broadcasts are stopped and 11 people are detained as police raid its headquarters.
  - Culture Minister Mehmet Ersoy announces that underwater excavations in the vicinity of Kekova Island have found pottery storage jars that date back 4,700 years to the Early Bronze Age from what he described as "the world's oldest shipwreck."
  - A 14-year-old child is killed, and hundreds of homes in Istanbul are flooded as a result of severe rain.
- 20 October – A 2019 maritime border agreement with Turkey is unanimously approved by Libya's eastern-based House of Representatives.
- 21 October – Indonesia, Pakistan, Turkey, and Qatar sign the Badr defense agreement.
- 23 October – Three workers are killed and five others are injured after a methane gas explosion inside a mine in Zonguldak Province.
- 24 October – Thousands demonstrate in Istanbul against the closure of media outlets and the detention of journalists.
- 27 October – Four workers are killed when a tornado hits a construction site in Kepez, Antalya.
- 29 October – A rock formation in the Göreme Historical National Park collapses, killing at least two people and injuring at least five more.
- 31 October – A soldier is killed in a cross-border gun attack at the Engin Mayin border post with Iran while intervening in an unauthorized crossing.

=== November ===
- 4 November – The US imposes new sanctions on companies and individuals in Turkey with ties to the Iranian regime.
- 5 November – 2026 Afyonkarahisar shootings: Eight people are killed in a gun attack in Afyonkarahisar Province.
- 7 November – A truck collides with a minibus in Van Province, killing nine people and injuring five others.
- 9–20 November – 2026 United Nations Climate Change Conference in Antalya.
- 9 November – An explosion at a steel factory in Aliağa kills 17 people and injures 12 others.
- 12 November – An S-70 helicopter of the Turkish Armed Forces crashes in Malatya, killing four people.
- 13 November – A mutual defense agreement is signed by Turkey and Qatar.
- 17 November – Police raid the pro-opposition broadcaster Sözcü TV's Istanbul headquarters, arresting executives and designating the Savings Deposit Insurance Fund of Turkey as a state trustee.
- 18 November – Following a false bomb threat, an Azimuth Airlines Sukhoi Superjet 100 traveling from Mineralnye Vody, Russia, to Antalya is safely evacuated.

=== Scheduled ===
- 3–20 December – 2026 European Women's Handball Championship in Czech Republic, Poland, Romania, Slovakia and Turkey.

== Holidays ==
- 1 January – New Year's Day
- 20 to 22 March – Ramazan Bayramı
- 23 April – Children's Day
- 1 May – Labour Day
- 19 May – Youth and Sports Day
- 27 to 30 May – Kurban Bayramı
- 15 July – Democracy and National Unity Day
- 30 August – Victory Day
- 29 October – Republic Day

== Deaths ==
- 3 January – Mesut İktu, 78, operatic baritone, administrator and voice teacher.
- 13 January – Ayfer Elmastaşoğlu, 81, footballer and football manager.
- 21 January – Haldun Dormen, 97, actor and director.
- 23 January – Selim Sadak, 71, MP (1991–1994) and mayor of Siirt (2009–2014).
- 24 January – Sefer Baygın, 83, Olympic wrestler (1972).
- 3 February – Şemsa Özar, 71, academic.
- 6 February – Nevin Efe, 78, actress (Valley of the Wolves: Ambush, Aşk ve Ceza, Arka Sokaklar).
- 11 February – Kanbolat Görkem Arslan, 45, actor.
- 12 February – Ömer Kaner, 74, football coach and player.
- 14 February – Nurcan Çelik, 46, footballer.
- 22 February – Ali Tutal, 75–76, actor (On Fertile Lands, Hemşo, Home Coming).
- 8 April – Ahmet Altay Cengizer, 71, diplomat.
- 11 April – Hüsamettin Cindoruk, 92, acting president (1993), twice member and speaker (1991–1995) of the Grand National Assembly.
- 15 June – Ece İrtem, 35, actress.
- 18 June – Theoliptos Fenerlis, 69, Turkish-Greek Orthodox prelate, metropolitan of Iconium (since 2000).
- 29 June – Arda Küçükyetim, 20, convicted attempted murderer (2024 Eskişehir stabbing).
- 5 August – Bilgesu Erenus, 82, playwright (death announced on this date)
- 5 September – Serhat Kılıç, 82, actor (Kuruluş: Osman, Maraşlı, Mehmed: Fetihler Sultanı)
- 17 September – Gülsen Tuncer, 80, actress (Aşk-ı Memnu, O Hayat Benim, Mrs. Fazilet and Her Daughters)
- 17 October – Sabri Anar, 60, Chaldean Catholic hierarch, archbishop of Amida (since 2023)
- 29 October – Ünal Erkan, 83–84, governor of OHAL region (1992–1995) and chief of the General Directorate of Security (1991–1992)

== See also ==
- Outline of Turkey
- Index of Turkey-related articles
- List of Turkey-related topics
- History of Turkey
- Other events in 2026
