= International Non-Profit Credit Rating Agency =

Proposed non-profit credit rating agency

The International Non-Profit Credit Rating Agency (INCRA) was a project to reform the assessment of states' creditworthiness. It was intended to serve as a non-profit alternative to the commercially oriented rating agencies. To improve the quality of the ratings, socio-economic indicators were taken into account in addition to macroeconomic factors. INCRA was presented in 2012 by the Bertelsmann Foundation and the Bertelsmann Stiftung.

== Background ==
The 2008 financial crisis made deficits in the financial sector visible to a broad public. As a result, the three major U.S. rating agencies Fitch, Moody's, and Standard & Poor's came into focus. Together they have a market share of over 90 %. Critics will present them with questionable assessments of the creditworthiness of states and companies. In particular, the commercial orientation of the rating agencies has been identified as a structural problem.

The German chancellor and other politicians called for a European alternative to the U.S. market leaders but rejected a state implementation. This initiative was taken up, for example, by the management consultancy Roland Berger, which presented a proposal for the reform of company ratings in 2011. In 2012, the Bertelsmann Stiftung in Germany and the Bertelsmann Foundation North America followed suit with a concept for assessing entire countries' creditworthiness.

== Rationale ==
A network of experts developed the idea of an international non-profit credit rating agency, the so-called International Non-Profit Credit Rating Agency (INCRA). This agency was not to be financed by creating ratings but from a capital stock's current income. According to calculations, around 400 million U.S. dollars would have been necessary to cover the costs of 15 to 25 million U.S. dollars annually permanently. The new legal and organizational structure of INCRA was to reflect the interests of governments, investors, and the public on an equal footing.

Besides, INCRA promised to improve the quality of its ratings. In addition to traditional macroeconomic factors, such as gross domestic product, debt levels, export strength, and price trends, forward-looking indicators were also taken into account concerning the socio-economic and political development of states, such as the government's crisis management, the implementation of reforms or investments in education. From this, the two foundations wanted to conclude potential problems in debt repayment. The scientific methodology of the Bertelsmann Transformation Index (BTI) and the Sustainable Governance Indicators (SGI) served as a basis for this.

== Reception ==
The presentation of INCRA in 2012 received wide media coverage, including the Financial Times Deutschland, Handelsblatt, and Die Welt. At that time, the G20, the most important industrialized and emerging countries, was already working on a reform of the framework conditions for rating agencies. According to the Bertelsmann Stiftung and the Bertelsmann Foundation North America, INCRA had the potential to make a significant contribution to this process. However, critics accused the originators of INCRA of achieving similar results in practice as the established U.S. rating agencies. In a pilot project of the Bertelsmann Foundation North America, the so-called INCRA Country Ratings, the creditworthiness of Germany, France, Italy, Japan, and Brazil was first assessed.

== Realization ==
To realize INCRA, governments, companies, foundations, and private individuals should pay into capital stock. After the financing of Roland Berger's rating agency had already failed in 2013, there was not enough support for INCRA until 2015. The project is not being pursued further today.
