= 2027 in Turkey =

- Centuries: 20th; 21st
- Decades: 2000s; 2010s; 2020s; 2030s
- See also: List of years in Turkey

Individuals and events related to 2027 in Turkey.

== Events ==
=== Scheduled ===
- 2 June – 2027 UEFA Conference League final
- 16–27 June – 2027 European Games
- 2027 Turkish parliamentary election

== Holidays ==
- 1 January – New Year's Day
- 9 to 11 March – Ramazan Bayramı
- 23 April – Children's Day
- 1 May – Labour Day
- 16 to 19 May – Kurban Bayramı
- 19 May – Youth and Sports Day
- 15 July – Democracy and National Unity Day
- 30 August – Victory Day
- 29 October – Republic Day

== See also ==
- Outline of Turkey
- Index of Turkey-related articles
- List of Turkey-related topics
- History of Turkey
- Other events in 2027
