= Andi Bushati =

Albanian journalist and columnist (born 1969)

- Born: 15 April 1969 (age 57); Tirana, PSR Albania
- Occupations: Journalist; Political commentator Columnist
- Years active: 1990–present

Andi Bushati (born 15 April 1969) is an Albanian journalist, columnist and political commentator. He is a co-founder, alongside Armand Shkullaku, of the online news portal Lapsi.al.

== Career ==
Bushati began his career at the daily newspaper Koha Jonë and later served as editor of Revista Klan. He has worked as a political commentator for several Albanian television programs. He regularly appears on the television program Të Paekspozuarit, providing analysis on current political issues.

Bushati is known for expressing personal views and commentary on the policies and governing styles of Prime Minister Edi Rama and former Prime Minister Sali Berisha.

== Criticisms ==
On October 24, 2024, Bushati publicly criticized journalist Klodiana Lala, callign her a “parrot” of SPAK in relation to her reporting on the arrest of Ilir Meta. The remark was reported by media freedom organizations as part of a broader pattern of hostile rhetoric toward journalists in Albania.
