= Krenar Gashi =

Krenar Gashi (born 1982) is a Kosovar Albanian political scientist, currently based in Belgium as a Basileus doctoral fellow at the Centre for EU Studies, Ghent University. His research interest include international relations, the European Union and the works of Jean Baudrillard, while his expertise is in the political developments in the Western Balkans.

Gashi studied sociology at the University of Pristina, and obtained an MA in Journalism and Communication. In 2013, Gashi obtained an MA (with distinction) in European Politics from the University of Sussex, and was awarded the Jean Monnet Prize by the Sussex European Institute.

Gashi started his career as a reporter, having worked for key Kosovo print and broadcast media. He reported for the Financial Times and was the Kosovo Editor of the Balkan Investigative Reporting Network, where he edited Balkan Insight and established Kosovo's only English-language newspaper, Prishtina Insight.

In 2009, Gashi joined KIPRED institute, Kosovo's first think tank, initially as a research director and later executive director. In 2011 he established the Institute for Development Policy (INDEP) a think tank that focuses on democratisation and sustainable development. Under Gashi's leadership INDEP became the most influential think tank in Kosovo, working closely with the Assembly of Kosovo and its parliamentary committees.

His publications include papers on democratization, election reform, development policy and European integration. He wrote Kosovo sections of Bertelsmann Foundation's Transformation Index and Freedom House's Nation in Transit report, which is one of the most eminent publication assessing the democratization process in the world.

He appears frequently in national and international media and engages in public debates on politics of Kosovo, the Western Balkans and the European Union.

== Awards ==
- Best Written Story in Kosovo 2007, awarded by the Association of Professional Journalists of Kosovo
  Chevening Scholarship 2012/13, awarded by the United Kingdom's Foreign and Commonwealth Office
  The Jean Monnet Prize 2013, awarded by the Sussex European Institute
  Basileus V Erasmus Mundus Scholarship, awarded by the European Commission

== Recent Publications ==
- Gashi, K. (2014) Nations in Transit: Kosovo. New York: Freedom House.
- Gashi, K. (2013) The 2013 Agreement between Kosovo and Serbia: A success story or a missed opportunity, in Felberbauer, E. and Jurekovic, P. (eds.) Regional Co-operation and Reconciliation in the Aftermath of the ICTY verdicts: Continuation or Stalemate? Vienna: Austrian Federal Ministry of Defence and Sports.
- Gashi, K. (2013) Nations in Transit Kosovo 2013, in Habdank–Kołaczkowska, S. (ed) Nations in Transit 2013. New York: Freedom House.
- Gashi, K. and Shahini, B. (2012) EU in Kosovo, Kosovo in the EU, in Swoboda, H., Stetter, E. and Wierma J.M. (eds) EU Enlargement Anno 2012. Brussels: FESP Solidar.
- Gashi K. (2012) Nations in Transit Kosovo 2012, in Walker, C., and Habdank–Kołaczkowska, S. (eds) Nations in Transit 2012, New York: Freedom House.
- Gashi, K. and Qavdarbasha S., (2012) The State of Media in Kosovo. Pristina: INDEP.
- Gashi, K, and Qosaj-Mustafa, A. (2011) Strengthening the Rule of Law in Kosovo: The Fight AgainstCorruption and Organised Crime. Pristina: KIPRED.
- Gashi, K. (2010) The Fragile Triangle: Coordination of Judges, *Prosecutors and Police duringCriminal Proceedings in Kosovo. Pristina: KIPRED.
- Gashi, K. (2009) Circulation and Politicisation of the Print Media in Kosovo. Pristina: OSCE.
