= Reporter.al =

News website

- Type: Investigative news website
- Owner(s): Balkan Investigative Reporting Network (BIRN, Albania)
- Founded: 2014
- Language: Albanian
- Website: reporter.al

Reporter.al is the Albanian-language online publication of the Balkan Investigative Reporting Network (BIRN).

It was launched by BIRN on 1 September 2014 in Tirana, in order to reach Albanian readers more directly, after seven years of covering the most important events from Albania for Balkan Insight. The site publishes real-time news, in-depth analyzes, opinion pieces, and original investigations, while also archiving earlier BIRN content previously produced for the English-language outlet Balkan Insight.

By 2019 it had released more than 250 investigative stories, significantly shaping national public discourse. It focuses on corruption, justice reform, human rights, organised crime and societal issues in Albania, serving as a leading platform for independent investigative journalism.

Reporter.al is a rare investigative media in Albania, and is part of BIRN Albania's programme ‘Exposing Corruption in Albania’.

== Funding ==
Reporter.al is operated by the non-profit BIRN Albania and funded through grants from donors including the Open Society Foundations Albania, the National Endowment for Democracy, the Balkan Trust for Democracy.

== Reception ==
The publication has received multiple honours, including the EU Investigative Journalism Award in Albania, the CEI SEEMO Award, and the Free Speech Award.

== Notable journalists ==
- Gjergj Erebara
- Aleksandra Bogdani
- Klodiana Lala
