= Aleksandra Bogdani =

Albanian investigative journalist

- Citizenship: Albania
- Occupation: Investigative journalist
- Employer(s): BalkanInsight (BIRN), Reporter.al
- Known for: Investigative reporting on organized crime and corruption in Albania

Aleksandra Bogdani is an Albanian investigative journalist and editor with more than 20 years of experience. She is affiliated with the Balkan Investigative Reporting Network in Albania and regularly contributes for Reporter.al.

Bogdani's professional output primarily involves the documentation and analysis of institutional and criminal activities within Albania, dealing with government concessions, corruption, tangled judicial and political affairs, as well as organized crime and human trafficking.

Her reporting has earned her numerous awards.

== Career ==
Before joining BIRN, Bogdani worked for 15 years as reporter, editor and deputy editor-in-chief of the Albanian daily newspapers Shekulli, Korrieri and MAPO.

Her investigative work has included major stories on the 2015 Albanian government sterilization-services concession, large-scale cocaine-trafficking networks linked to Colombian cartels (investigated by SPAK in 2025), and high-profile judicial and political cases, among them reporting involving Tirana Mayor Erion Veliaj.

Bogdani gives lectures in investigative journalism at the Department of Journalism and Communication at the University of Tirana, and mentors young journalists through BIRN media-development programmes.

== Awards and recognition ==
She has received several awards for her reporting, including the 2015 CEI/SEEMO Award for Outstanding Merits in Investigative Journalism, and the first prize (with Flamur Vezaj) in the 2014 EU Investigative Journalism Award for a series of three articles on recruitment of Albanians fighting as jihadists in Syria.

Bogdani participated in the Balkan Fellowship for Journalistic Excellence in 2012, with her work addressing the lack of closure for victims of Albanian communism. She won the third prize of the Balkan Fellowship for Journalistic Excellence.
