= Klodiana Lala =

Albanian reporter and investigative journalist

- Born: Albania
- Citizenship: Albania
- Occupations: Investigative journalist Reporter; TV host
- Employer(s): News 24 (TV channel); BalkanInsight; Reporter.al
- Known for: Investigative reporting on organized crime and corruption in Albania

Klodiana Lala is an Albanian investigative journalist and TV presenter specializing in organized crime, corruption and the judicial system in Albania. She is currently a lead reporter for News 24, where she hosts the investigative program Në Shënjestër (On Target), and is also a frequent contributor to Balkan Insight (BIRN) and Reporter.al.

Lala's career spans over two decades and is defined by high-stakes reporting on transnational drug trafficking, money laundering, and the infiltration of criminal networks into Albanian politics, and often provides in-depth coverage and analysis on the Special Anti-Corruption Structure (SPAK) investigations.

== Threats and intimidation ==
While covering high-profile organized crime and governmental scandals she has been faced with severe intimidation tactics. In 2018, her family home was targeted in a gunfire attack linked to her reporting on political-criminal ties, an incident widely condemned by press freedom organizations like Reporters Without Borders (RSF) as an attempt to silence her reporting.

During the announcement of life sentences in a criminal case, chaos erupted in the courtroom as defendants tried to escape and relatives hurled chairs at judges and journalists, including Klodiana Lala, who reported that “The court officers didn’t intervene” as reporters were physically threatened.

Another episode, on 24 October 2024, involved journalist Andi Bushati who verbally abused Lala, by calling her a “parrot” of SPAK, in relation to her reporting on the arrest of Ilir Meta, a remark viewed as contributing to the broader climate of intimidation and hostility toward journalists in Albania.

Lala has also faced physical obstruction by police during field operations, and the seizure of professional journalistic files and devices during a 2025 police raid on News 24.

== Journalistic awards ==
Her journalistic commitment has earned her international acclaim and awards, including the 2019 Free Speech Award from the South East Europe Coalition of Whistleblower Protection and multiple EU Investigative Journalism Awards for her exposés on cocaine supply chains and electoral corruption.

She also won the prize Vangjush Gambeta "Reporteri i Vitit 2018" (Reporter of 2018) given by the Union of Journalists of Albania.

== See also ==
- Reporter.al
- BalkanInsight
- SPAK
