= Gjergj Erebara =

Albanian journalist

- Citizenship: Albania
- Education: University of Tirana
- Occupations: Investigative journalist Economic journalist
- Employer: BIRN Albania

Gjergj Erebara is an Albanian investigative journalist and editor for Balkan Investigative Reporting Network (BIRN) in Albania. He specializes in economic reporting, investigative reporting on corruption, politics, and social issues in Albania and the Western Balkans.

Erebara completed his studies in journalism at the University of Tirana in 2002, and holds a MSc in Economic History from Lund University in Sweden. He has worked in several Albanian media as a journalists and editor. Since 2014, he has worked as an editor for BIRN Albania and is a frequent contributor to its publications, Balkan Insight and Reporter.al.

Erebara is also a prolific translator of non-fiction and historical literature from English into Albanian, having translated books from George Orwell, Mary Beard, Edward Gibbon etc. He has criticized the online Albanian dictionary published by the Academy of Sciences of Albania.

He has been outspoken about his opposition to the Anti-Defamation Law targeting online media, proposed by Prime Minister Edi Rama, calling it a type of "media police" and disputing its basis on any European media laws.
