= List of Turkish films of 2024 =

List of Turkish films released in 2024, organized by release date

A list of Turkish films released in 2024.

== January–March ==
Opening		Title	Director	Cast	Genre	Ref.
J A N U A R Y	5	Ataturk 1881 - 1919 (Part 2)	Mehmet Ada Öztekin	Aras Bulut İynemli, Songül Öden, Sarp Akkaya	Drama, History, Biography	
J A N U A R Y	5	Başkan	Ulaş Bahadır	Diren Polatogullari, Necip Memili, Büşra Pekin	Drama, Comedy	
J A N U A R Y	12	3391 Kilometers	Deniz EnYüksek	Derya Pınar Ak, Ahmet Haktan Zavlak	Drama	
J A N U A R Y	12	Kolpaçino 4 4'lük	Kamil Cetin	Şafak Sezer, Aydemir Akbaş, Serkan Şengül	Comedy	
J A N U A R Y	12	Narsistle Aşk	Valerie Donzelli	Virginie Efira, Melvil Poupaud, Dominique Reymond	Drama	
J A N U A R Y	19	Kardeş Takımı	Mustafa Kotan	Fırat Albayram, Ceyda Townli	Comedy	
J A N U A R Y	19	Lohusa	Kıvanç Baruönü	Gupse Özay, Onur Gürçay, Hazal Türesan	Comedy	
J A N U A R Y	26	Cem Karaca'nın Gözyaşları	Yuksel Aksu	Ismail Hacıoğlu, Fikret Kuşkan, Yasemin Yalçın	Drama, Biography	
F E B R U A R Y	2	Season of Love (Aşk Mevsimi)	Murat Şeker	Dilan Çiçek Deniz, Cem Yiğit Üzümoğlu, Duygu Sarışın	Romance	
F E B R U A R Y	16	C Takımı	Bora Onur	Toygan Avanoğlu, Murat Akkoyunlu, Sera Tokdemir	Comedy	
M A R	1	7 Melek	Murat Onbul	Burcu Kıratlı, Öznur Serçeler, Pelin Uluksar	Drama	

== April–June ==
Opening		Title	Director	Cast	Genre	Ref.
A P R I L	19	Arap Kadri	Emre Kavuk	Ahmet Mümtaz Taylan, Necip Memili, Zeynep Çamcı	Comedy	
A P R I L	26	Cadi	Erman Bostan	Furkan Andıç, Buse Meral, Çağdaş Onur Öztürk	Thriller, Drama, Historical, Mystery	
A P R I L	26	Zah-Har "Cin Ahalisi"	Battal Karslıoğlu	Ümit Acar, Belma Mamati, Mesut Gedikoğlu	Horror thriller	
M A Y	3	Çocuk Kalbi	Sinan Biçici	İlker Aksum, Alihan Türkdemir, Eser Eyüboğlu	Family, Drama	
M A Y	3	Tereddüt Çizgisi	Selman Nacar	Tülin Özen, Oğulcan Arman Uslu, Gülçin Kültür Şahin	Drama	
M A Y	10	MAKKA: Cinn-i Azap	Mert Uzunmehmet	Oğuzhan Mengübeti, Yağmur Körpe, Raziye Tokgöz	Horror	
M A Y	10	Gypsy Girl Zeugma	Kamil Cetin	İnan Ulaş Torun, Aysel Nazim, Altan Erkekli	Comedy, Romance	
M A Y	17	Alem-i Jinn 5: Torment	Ahmet Arslan	Özcan Varaylı, Levent Çakır, Merve Özel	Horror	
M A Y	17	Dünya Malı - Eksi Bir	Uygur Akkaya	Berk Hakman, Erkan Köse, Asena Tuğal	Adventure, Action, Mystery	

== See also ==
- 2024 in Turkey
- List of 2024 box office number-one films in Turkey
