= Arbana Xharra =

Kosovo Albanian investigative journalist

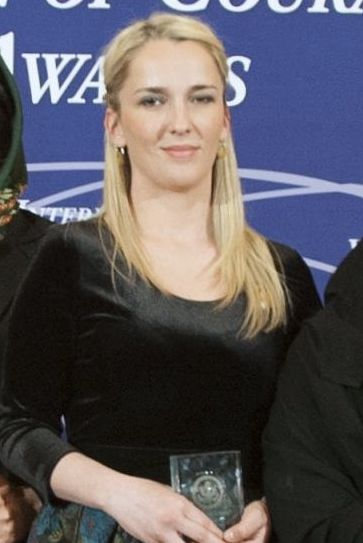
- Xharra received the International Women of Courage Award in 2015.
- Citizenship: Kosovo
- Occupation: Editor in Chief
- Employer: Zeri

Arbana Xharra is a Kosovar Albanian investigative journalist. She has won numerous awards for her reporting and was a 2015 recipient of the International Women of Courage Award from the US State Department.

== Career ==
Arbana Xharra has been working as a journalist since 2001. She worked for Koha Ditore, the first independent newspaper established in Kosovo, in 2006 and 2007. She has been a contributor to Balkan Insight and is currently editor-in-chief of Zëri.

=== Investigative reporter ===
Arbana Xharra believes that for democracy to flourish, the press must have the right to investigate public concerns. She has written about a wide range of issues including a 2006 investigation on government expense reports and financial mismanagement; a 2007 examination of inflation and food shortages; a report in 2010 questioning how the assets of the state-run Telecom of Kosovo were being used; and relationships between businesses and politics. Xharra faced legal action in 2012 when a report she prepared on government corruption linked a local business with politicians. She was exonerated by the court, whose ruling stated that she had complied with the Code of Ethics for print media of Kosovo.

Over an 18-month period beginning in 2012, Xharra investigated the rise in religious activity since the collapse of socialism in the former Yugoslavia. She reported on religious extremism and its impact on society. By evaluating Islamic extremists operating in Kosovo, she discovered links with terrorist organizations. Uncovering operational and financial links, Xharra was able to assist the government in efforts to address the problem, but the reports caused her to receive death threats and public attacks on her reputation. She reported them to the police, but with no consequences.

=== Political Affiliation ===
On 9 May 2017, she resigned in Zëri and became the member of the PDK - the biggest political party in Kosovo. A few days later on 13 May 2017, she was brutally beaten on a parking place in Pristina. Kosovo leaders, journalists and civil society representatives condemned the attack. Arbana Xharra resigned from PDK in May 2018. She is currently writing and researching with NYU professor Alon Ben-Meir on Turkey and radicalization in Balkan.

== Awards and recognition ==
Xharra was three-time winner of the UNDP Prize for her articles on corruption in Kosovo in 2006, 2007, and 2008. In 2012 she was awarded a Balkan Fellowship for Journalistic Excellence and studied the changing attitudes towards Islam in Kosovo. In 2013 she was awarded the Rexhai Surroi Award by the KOHA Group for an article on extremism and the Stirring Up Debate Award from INPO Ferizaj (Progress Initiative) for creating public discourse on religious extremism. In 2015 she won the US Secretary of State's International Women of Courage Award for the European division. In 2022, Arbana Xharra received an award from the American magazine "My New York" in the nomination for heroism.
