= List of 2023 box office number-one films in Turkey =

This is a list of films which placed number one at the weekly box office in Turkey during 2023. The weeks start on Fridays, and finish on Thursdays. The box-office number one is established in terms of tickets sold during the week.

== Box office number-one films ==
Mortal World 2 became the highest grossing film of 2023 despite never reaching #1.

Week	End date for the week	Film	Gross (₺)	Tickets sold	Note(s)
1	January 5, 2023	Avatar: The Way of Water	₺22,131,038	311,566	
2	January 12, 2023	Rafadan Tayfa Galaktik Tayfa	₺35,221,465	582,460	
3	January 19, 2023	Rafadan Tayfa Galaktik Tayfa	₺30,021,216	512,023	
4	January 26, 2023	Rafadan Tayfa Galaktik Tayfa	₺41,331,075	689,269	
5	February 2, 2023	Rafadan Tayfa Galaktik Tayfa	₺35,978,444	590,832	
6	February 9, 2023	Rafadan Tayfa Galaktik Tayfa	₺13,053,609	202,116	
7	February 16, 2023	Rafadan Tayfa Galaktik Tayfa	₺5,629,781	112,505	
8	February 23, 2023	Rafadan Tayfa Galaktik Tayfa	₺3,836,685	80,096	
9	March 2, 2023	Ant-Man and the Wasp: Quantumania	₺11,377,126	143,073	
10	March 9, 2023	Ant-Man and the Wasp: Quantumania	₺16,754,307	70.198	
11	March 16, 2023	Scream VI	₺6,467,745	82.332	
12	March 23, 2023	John Wick: Chapter 4	₺6,507,158	88,413	
13	March 30, 2023	John Wick: Chapter 4	₺26,943,400	318,858	
14	April 6, 2023	John Wick: Chapter 4	₺16,591,066	195,525	
15	April 13, 2023	John Wick: Chapter 4	₺11.431.700	128,936	
16	April 20, 2023	The Super Mario Bros. Movie	₺13,311,568	164,085	
17	April 27, 2023	The Super Mario Bros. Movie	₺8,876,761	111,766	
18	May 4, 2023	The Super Mario Bros. Movie	₺7,766.139	97,389	
19	May 11, 2023	Guardians of the Galaxy Vol. 3	₺13,971,022	148,698	
20	May 18, 2023	Guardians of the Galaxy Vol. 3	₺6,829,351	73.767	
21	May 25, 2023	Fast X	₺71.735.121	827,838	
22	June 1, 2023	Fast X	₺23,709,406	272,522	
23	June 8, 2023	Fast X	₺15,038,902	170,550	
24	June 15, 2023	Transformers: Rise of the Beasts	₺12,788,445	143.511	
25	June 22, 2023	Spider-Man: Across the Spider-Verse	₺9,479,072	105,522	
26	June 29, 2023	Elemental	₺6,161,329	67,947	
27	July 6, 2023	Elemental	₺4,455,068	50,771	
28	July 13, 2023	Captain Pengu and Friends 3: The Legend of the Ice Buffalo	₺7,097,522	84,446	
29	July 20, 2023	Mission: Impossible – Dead Reckoning Part One	₺13,555,206	120,079	
30	July 27, 2023	Barbie	₺69,565,033	701,528	
31	August 3, 2023	Oppenheimer	₺42,856,557	393,355	
32	August 10, 2023	Oppenheimer	₺27,260,208	241,393	
33	August 17, 2023	Oppenheimer	₺17,794,986	153,578	
34	August 24, 2023	Oppenheimer	₺10,259,412	90,970	
35	August 31, 2023	Oppenheimer	₺7.342,157	62,602	
36	September 7, 2023	Doru Macera Adası	₺4,799,758	54,106	
37	September 14, 2023	The Nun II	₺6,961,899	65,751	
38	September 21, 2023	Ladybug & Cat Noir: The Movie	₺5,679,425	60,290	
39	September 28, 2023	Expend4bles	₺7,281,178	70,561	
40	October 5, 2023	About Dry Grasses	₺13,417,350	118,848	
41	October 12, 2023	About Dry Grasses	₺9,255,172	82,669	
42	October 19, 2023	About Dry Grasses	₺6,326,884	54,600	
43	October 26, 2023	Ibi: The Mystery of the Orient Express	₺7,950,338	82,435	
44	November 2, 2023	Çok Aşk	₺14,674,636	138,354	
45	November 9, 2023	Atatürk 1881 - 1919	₺52,503,178	470,528	
46	November 16, 2023	Atatürk 1881 - 1919	₺61,634,409	566,445	
47	November 23, 2023	Atatürk 1881 - 1919	₺27,805,452	245,172	
48	November 30, 2023	Atatürk 1881 - 1919	₺16,024,389	144,290	
49	December 7, 2023	Ölümlü Dünya 2	₺83,316,246	658,918	
50	December 14, 2023	Ölümlü Dünya 2	₺52,786,652	418,376	
51	December 21, 2023	Ölümlü Dünya 2	₺34,635,302	261,432	
52	December 28, 2023	Breath: Ground Minus Two	₺15,181,732	136,942	

== Highest-grossing films ==
=== In-Year Release ===
Highest-grossing films of 2023 by In-year release
Rank	Title	Distributor	Domestic gross
1.	Mortal World 2	CJ ENM	₺187,975,877
2.	Oppenheimer	UIP	₺187,196,719
3.	Atatürk 1881 - 1919	CJ ENM	₺176,867,562
4.	Rafadan Tayfa Galaktik Tayfa	CGV Mars	₺170,206,462
5.	Barbie	TME Films	₺141,047,157
6.	Fast X	UIP	₺137,022,627
7.	John Wick 4	CJ ENM	₺89,082,399
8.	Kutsal Damacana 4	CJ ENM	₺75,264,923
9.	Puss in Boots: The Last Wish	UIP	₺56,423,043
10.	Spider-Man: Across the Spider-Verse	Sony Pictures Releasing	₺52,263,645

== See also ==
- List of 2022 box office number-one films in Turkey
- 2023 in Turkey
- List of Turkish films of 2023

Preceded by 2022 Box office number-one films	Box office number-one films 2023	Succeeded by 2024 Box office number-one films
