= Eros (cat) =

Stray cat killed by İbrahim Keloğlan

- Species: Felis catus
- Breed: Tabby cat
- Sex: Male
- Born: 2018; Başakşehir, Istanbul, Turkey
- Died: 1 January 2024; Başakşehir, Istanbul, Turkey
- Owner: Stray cat
- Named after: Eros

Eros (2018 – 1 January 2024) was a stray cat, who lived in a housing complex in Başakşehir, Istanbul, Turkey. Eros was subjected to torture and killed by an individual named İbrahim Keloğlan, who also resided in the same complex. The subsequent legal proceedings, including a reduction in the sentence with good behavior and a deferred sentence, sparked public outrage and led to protest demonstrations across various cities in Turkey.

== Life ==
A resident of the complex, giving an interview to the newspaper after Eros' death, mentioned that the cat was approximately 6 years old and had been cared for by the people living there since birth. The cat was named Eros due to his affectionate and gentle nature.

== Death ==
On 1 January 2024, İbrahim Keloğlan encountered Eros in the elevator of their apartment building. Without any apparent reason, Keloğlan began kicking the cat. Despite Eros' attempts to escape when the elevator doors opened on another floor, Keloğlan followed and blocked all escape routes, continuing the torture for approximately six minutes, killing Eros. Following the incident captured by security cameras in the building, İbrahim Keloğlan faced legal charges.

=== Trial ===
In the indictment prepared by the Küçükçekmece Public Prosecutor's Office, the defendant was accused of kicking a cat, initially inside the elevator and later blocking the animal's exit from the building corridor, leading to the cat's death. İbrahim Keloğlan faced a trial for the offense of "intentional killing of a pet or domestic animal," with a possible sentence of six months to four years. During the first hearing held on 8 February 2024, at the Küçükçekmece 16th Criminal Court of First Instance, Keloğlan was sentenced to one year and three months in prison. However, he benefited from a three-month sentence reduction due to good behavior, and the court subsequently deferred the announcement of the verdict. Lawyers for the case expressed dissatisfaction with the decision, stating that it was unlawfully lenient, and animal rights activists organized protests nationwide through social media. The Küçükçekmece Public Prosecutor's Office and the Istanbul Bar Association Animal Rights Center announced their intention to appeal the verdict and take the case to a higher court.

=== Protests ===
The first collective reaction to Eros' killing came from the residents of the complex where the incident occurred. On 13 February people gathered in the complex, protesting against the release of the perpetrator and demanding the removal of İbrahim Keloğlan from the premises. Activists associated with the "For Life Law Platform" announced demonstrations for justice in various cities, including Ankara, Antalya, Hatay, Istanbul, and İzmir.

- 13 February 2024: The first nationwide protests, triggered by Eros' killing, began at the complex where he lived and died. İbrahim Keloğlan, acquitted in the trial, was protested by residents gathered in a common area. People expressed their unwillingness to live with a murderer and pledged to follow the legal process, initiating a signature campaign to expel Keloğlan from the complex.
- 16 February 2024: In the Karşıyaka district of İzmir, a group of animal lovers gathered to protest İbrahim Keloğlan for the killing of Eros and demanded a prison sentence. Demonstrators, including lawyers, called for the removal of leniency in sentences for crimes against animals and the abolition of sentence reductions.
- 17 February 2024: Activists in Ankara's Çankaya district gathered to demonstrate for Eros and all animals subjected to torture and killing by humans. The initiative, led by the "For Life Law Initiative," received support from members of the "Diren Tekir Nature and Animal Protection Association" and the "Ankara Bar Association Animal Rights Center," as well as journalist İrfan Değirmenci.
- 18 February 2024: Protesters, led by actress Leyla Somer, gathered in front of Marmara Park, a shopping mall in Esenyurt, to protest against the release of the suspect.

=== Other reactions ===
==== Turkey ====
Animal rights advocates, protesting the release of İbrahim Keloğlan after the first trial, initiated a signature campaign through Change.org by calling on the public with the hashtags #ibrahimkeloğlantutuklansın (#ibrahimkeloglanshouldbearrested) and #kedikatili (#catmurderer). Launched on 12 February 2024, the campaign garnered approximately 250,000 signatures in its first week. Justice Minister Yılmaz Tunç also reminded that the case would be retried, using the phrase "The right to life of every creature is sacred. We will continue to oppose any kind of mistreatment towards our animal friends" in a tweet. Another statement by Tunç on 24 February revealed that President Recep Tayyip Erdoğan had personally intervened in the matter, considering it as "having no place in public conscience".

==== International press ====
The trial following Eros's death was closely monitored by many foreign media associations. Dutch news channel RTL Nieuws highlighted the social media organising of animal lovers in Turkey, running campaigns in favor of Eros under the headline "The Killing of Cat Eros Engages Turkey (and Now Even President Erdogan)." Balkan Insight, a website based in Serbia, covered the trial process, emphasizing the dissatisfaction of animal rights advocates with the sentence given to İbrahim Keloğlan. The South China Morning Post from Hong Kong, BFM TV from France, Gazet van Antwerpen from Belgium, De Gelderlander from the Netherlands, and Kronen Zeitung from Austria were among the media outlets sharing bulletins related to the matter.
