= Klan (magazine) =

Weekly political and business magazine in Albania

- Former editors: Andi Bushati
- Categories: Political magazine Business magazine
- Frequency: Weekly
- Founded: 1997
- First issue: 1 February 1997; 29 years ago
- Company: ADA group
- Country: Albania
- Based in: Tirana
- Language: Albanian
- Website: Klan

Klan is an Albanian language weekly political and finance magazine based in Tirana, Albania. The weekly provides economic and political news.

== History and profile ==
Klan was first published in February 1997. Businessmen Marsel Skendo and Julien Roche, journalists Aleksander Frangaj, Armand Shkullaku, Andi Bushati, Edmond Laci, Sokol Balla, and designer Suad Barbullushi, are the co-founders of the magazine. The latter also worked as an editor in the magazine.

Klan is one of the publications and media outlets owned by Klan group. As of 2002 the publisher of the magazine was Media 5 company which also published Korrieri, a daily. Later Klan became part of the ADA group. The group also owns Klan TV.

The magazine focuses on political and economic news. As of 2007 Andi Bushati was the editor of the magazine which is published weekly. It has its headquarters in Tirana. Edi Rama, current Prime Minister of Albania, was among its contributors.

The magazine offers the award of the "Company of the Year".

In 2002 Klan had a circulation of 4,700 copies.

== See also ==
- List of magazines in Albania
