= Association of Professional Journalists of Albania =

APJ Albania
- (in English) Association of Professional Journalists of Albania (APJ Albania)
- Shoqata "Gazetarët Profesionistë të Shqipërisë" (APJ Albania)
- Headquarters: Tirana, Albania
- Location: Albania
- Key people: Armand Shkullaku, president
- Affiliations: Union federation

The Association of Professional Journalists of Albania (Short: APJ Albania) is a union for journalists based in Tirana, Albania. It is part of International Federation of Journalists and European Federation of Journalists. The Association of Professional Journalists of Albania was founded about in October 1993 and since the beginning took a critical position in commenting on matters affecting the Albanian media, and its activities and reputation are now such that it defends the rights of all journalists. The Association of Professional Journalists of Albania is the most active and representative such body in Albania, and it is a member of The International Federation of Journalists (IFJ) The main role of The Association of Professional Journalists of Albania is to protect the right of free expression and the rights of journalists in Albania.
