= List of 2022 box office number-one films in Turkey =

This is a list of films which placed number one at the weekly box office in Turkey during 2022. The weeks start on Fridays, and finish on Thursdays. The box-office number one is established in terms of tickets sold during the week.

== Box office number-one films ==
†	This implies the highest-grossing movie of the year.

Week	End date for the week	Film	Gross (₺)	Tickets sold	Note(s)
1	January 6, 2022	Kesişme: İyi ki Varsın Eren	₺8.127.754	352.105	
2	January 13, 2022	Kesişme: İyi ki Varsın Eren	₺9.545.968	414.713	
3	January 20, 2022	Kesişme: İyi ki Varsın Eren	₺8.647.823	384.541	
4	January 27, 2022	Kesişme: İyi ki Varsın Eren	₺6.831.258	291.352	
5	February 3, 2022	Kesişme: İyi ki Varsın Eren	₺7.128.282	305.337	
6	February 10, 2022	Dilberay	₺6.013.495	221.837	
7	February 17, 2022	Dilberay	₺4.822.986	177.950	
8	February 24, 2022	Dilberay	₺3.711.112	137.350	
9	March 3, 2022	Uncharted	₺3.388.036	103.327	
10	March 10, 2022	Bergen †	₺47.889.447	1.663.113	
11	March 17, 2022	Bergen †	₺49.912.586	1.710.834	
12	March 24, 2022	Bergen †	₺33.278.358	1.117.387	
13	March 31, 2022	Bergen †	₺16.764.300	560.141	
14	April 7, 2022	Bergen †	₺4.511.084	145.781	
15	April 14, 2022	Sonic the Hedgehog 2	₺8.424.401	273.796	
16	April 21, 2022	Fantastic Beasts: The Secrets of Dumbledore	₺7.545.252	192.042	
17	April 28, 2022	Fantastic Beasts: The Secrets of Dumbledore	₺3.594.553	93.440	
18	May 5, 2022	Fantastic Beasts: The Secrets of Dumbledore	₺4.133.408	105.093	
19	May 12, 2022	Doctor Strange in the Multiverse of Madness	₺31.390.063	823.809	
20	May 19, 2022	Doctor Strange in the Multiverse of Madness	₺12.369.265	319.168	
21	May 26, 2022	Doctor Strange in the Multiverse of Madness	₺4.877.107	125.320	
22	June 2, 2022	Top Gun: Maverick	₺5.157.411	120.968	
23	June 9, 2022	Top Gun: Maverick	₺4.517.934	104.544	
24	June 16, 2022	Jurassic World Dominion	₺7.369.545	190.113	
25	June 23, 2022	Jurassic World Dominion	₺4.561.929	114.253	
26	June 30, 2022	Jurassic World Dominion	₺2.664.313	66.409	
27	July 7, 2022	Minions: The Rise of Gru	₺11.725.991	287.670	
28	July 14, 2022	Thor: Love and Thunder	₺23.202.015	539.772	
29	July 21, 2022	Thor: Love and Thunder	₺10.116.533	238.922	
30	July 28, 2022	Thor: Love and Thunder	₺6.252.372	143.646	
31	August 4, 2022	Thor: Love and Thunder	₺4.614.369	98.090	
32	August 11, 2022	Bullet Train	₺4.089.643	79.984	
33	August 18, 2022	Bullet Train	₺3.130.718	61.506	
34	August 25, 2022	Bullet Train	₺2.262.952	46.238	
35	September 1, 2022	Minions: The Rise of Gru	₺1.888.807	41.295	
36	September 8, 2022	Tad, the Lost Explorer and the Emerald Tablet	₺2.030.571	45.267	
37	September 15, 2022	Tad, the Lost Explorer and the Emerald Tablet	₺980.286	21.070	
38	September 22, 2022	Ticket to Paradise	₺1.402.120	23.790	
39	September 29, 2022	Tay	₺5.030.723	110.925	
40	October 6, 2022	Tay	₺5.168.962	116.325	
41	October 13, 2022	Tay	₺4.825.577	107.683	
42	October 20, 2022	Tay	₺3.977.016	90.784	
43	October 27, 2022	Aslan Hürkuş: Görevimiz Gökbey	₺10.139.537	206.743	
44	November 3, 2022	Aslan Hürkuş: Görevimiz Gökbey	₺9.325.796	191.703	
45	November 10, 2022	Aslan Hürkuş: Görevimiz Gökbey	₺5.433.142	115.473	
46	November 17, 2022	Black Panther: Wakanda Forever	₺14.238.522	233.704	
47	November 24, 2022	Barış Akarsu "Merhaba"	₺8.691.461	159.647	
48	December 1, 2022	Müjdemi İsterim	₺6.273.144	112.663	
49	December 8, 2022	Çakallarla Dans 6	₺17.919.112	309.350	
50	December 15, 2022	Çakallarla Dans 6	₺12.695.771	218.991	
51	December 22, 2022	Avatar: The Way of Water	₺50.559.564	776.212	
52	December 29, 2022	Avatar: The Way of Water	₺35.359.061	538.798	

== Highest-grossing films ==
=== In-Year Release ===
Highest-grossing films of 2022 by In-year release
Rank	Title	Distributor	Domestic gross
1.	Bergen	CJ ENM	₺160.057.802
2.	Avatar: The Way of Water	UIP	₺85.918.625
3.	Doctor Strange in the Multiverse of Madness	UIP	₺59.457.089
4.	Thor: Love and Thunder	UIP	₺53.751.717
5.	Kesişme: İyi ki Varsın Eren	CGV Mars	₺53.306.387
6.	Minions: The Rise of Gru	UIP	₺49.750.622
7.	Aslan Hürküş: Görevimiz Gökbey	CGV Mars	₺43.691.400
8.	Çakallarla Dans 6	CJ ENM	₺41.540.845
9.	The Batman	Warner Bros.	₺36.684.759
10.	Black Panther: Wakanda Forever	UIP	₺30.846.700

== See also ==
- List of 2023 box office number-one films in Turkey
