= List of 2025 box office number-one films in Turkey =

This is a list of films which placed number one at the weekly box office in Turkey during 2025. The weeks start on Fridays, and finish on Thursdays. The box-office number one is established in terms of tickets sold during the week.

== Box office number-one films ==
Week	End date for the week	Film	Tickets sold	Gross (₺)	Ref.
1	January 2, 2025	Rafadan Tayfa: Kapadokya	594,051	₺101,273,720	
2	January 9, 2025	Rafadan Tayfa: Kapadokya	347,920	₺57,548,419	
3	January 16, 2025	Rafadan Tayfa: Kapadokya	333,478	₺52,083,673	
4	January 23, 2025	Rafadan Tayfa: Kapadokya	366,427	₺63,453,892	
5	January 30, 2025	Rafadan Tayfa: Kapadokya	348,687	₺60,400,688	
6	February 6, 2025	Rafadan Tayfa: Kapadokya	129,071	₺24,000,898	
7	February 13, 2025	Dayı: Bir Adamın Hikâyesi 2	133,268	₺26,981,941	
8	February 20, 2025	Aşk Sadece Bir An	224,686	₺42,483,252	
8	February 27, 2025	Aşk Sadece Bir An	125,512	₺23,270,276	
9	March 5, 2025	Aşk Sadece Bir An	64,039	₺10,614,523	
10	March 12, 2025	Mickey 17	39,966	₺9,831,380	
11	March 19, 2025	Mickey 17	23,511	₺5,766,940	
12	March 26, 2025	Snow White	22,651	₺5,234,194	
13	April 2, 2025	Akıllı Tavşan Momo: Büyük Takip	164,578	₺31,465,687	
14	April 9, 2025	A Minecraft Movie	311,745	₺71,098,139	
15	April 16, 2025	A Minecraft Movie	266,856	₺60,323,307	
16	April 23, 2025	A Minecraft Movie	176,847	₺38,944,681	
17	April 30, 2025	A Minecraft Movie	105,795	₺22,880,851	
18	May 7, 2025	Thunderbolts*	70,536	₺17,822,148	
19	May 14, 2025	Thunderbolts*	38,697	₺10,114,230	
20	May 21, 2025	Final Destination Bloodlines	101,881	₺25,973,605	
21	May 28, 2025	Lilo & Stitch	78,811	₺18,983,651	
22	June 4, 2025	Sihirli Annem: Hepimiz Biriz	285,238	₺61,219,585	
23	June 11, 2025	Siccin 8	193,429	₺42,028,546	
24	June 18, 2025	Sihirli Annem: Hepimiz Biriz	120,613	₺24,280,361	
25	June 25, 2025	Sihirli Annem: Hepimiz Biriz	92,550	₺19,177,006	
26	July 2, 2025	F1	115,914	₺33,599,727	
27	July 9, 2025	Jurassic World Rebirth	93,246	₺22,432,872	
28	July 16, 2025	Superman	95,621	₺26,842,308	
29	July 23, 2025	Smurfs	110,593	₺24,457,291	
30	July 30, 2025	The Fantastic Four: First Steps	100,313	₺28,392,114	

== Highest-grossing films ==
=== In-Year Release ===
Highest-grossing films of 2025 by In-year release
Rank	Title	Distributor	Domestic gross
1	Sister Team 2	CJ ENM	₺117,208,020

== See also ==
- List of 2024 box office number-one films in Turkey
- 2025 in Turkey

Preceded by 2024 Box office number-one films	Box office number-one films 2025	Succeeded by 2026 Box office number-one films
