= List of 2024 box office number-one films in Turkey =

This is a list of films which placed number one at the weekly box office in Turkey during 2024. The weeks start on Fridays, and finish on Thursdays. The box-office number one is established in terms of tickets sold during the week.

== Box office number-one films ==
†	This implies the highest-grossing movie of the year.

Week	End date for the week	Film	Gross (₺)	Tickets sold	Note(s)
1	January 4, 2024	Rafadan Tayfa 4: Hayrimator	₺49,318,459	443,255	
2	January 11, 2024	Rafadan Tayfa 4: Hayrimator	₺36,844,461	330,198	
3	January 18, 2024	Kolpachino 4 quarts	₺91,096,290	729,416	
4	January 25, 2024	Lohusa	₺79,053,730	594,423	
5	February 1, 2024	Lohusa	₺71,910,346	549,741	
6	February 8, 2024	Lohusa	₺44,189,526	329,340	
7	February 15, 2024	Lohusa	₺30,545,107	232,830	
8	February 22, 2024	King Şakir: Giants Awakened	₺30,560,406	226,945	
9	February 29, 2024	King Şakir: Giants Awakened	₺17,442,823	133,218	
10	March 7, 2024	Dune: Part Two	₺36.219.814	197.829	
11	March 14, 2024	Dune: Part Two	₺28.607.232	151.949	
12	March 21, 2024	Dune: Part Two	₺18.876.797	96.006	
13	March 28, 2024	Dune: Part Two	₺12,126,939	60,305	
14	April 4, 2024	Dune: Part Two	₺6,806,040	32,980	
15	April 11, 2024	Kung Fu Panda 4	₺27,300,602	175,830	
16	April 18, 2024	Kung Fu Panda 4	₺20,813,123	140,023	
17	April 25, 2024	Kung Fu Panda 4	₺19,539,447	127,777	
18	May 2, 2024	Cadı	₺15,899,166	112,614	
19	May 9, 2024	Cadı	₺9.931.706	75.452	
20	May 16, 2024	Kingdom of the Planet of the Apes	₺25,800,426	159,524	
21	May 23, 2024	Kingdom of the Planet of the Apes	₺13,600,505	83,654	
22	May 30, 2024	Furiosa: A Mad Max Saga	₺9,962,254	54,962	
23	June 6, 2024	The Garfield Movie	₺10,991,738	70,698	
24	June 13, 2024	The Garfield Movie	₺10,556,593	72,928	
25	June 20, 2024	Inside Out 2 †	₺104,465,805	603,949	
26	June 27, 2024	Inside Out 2 †	₺68,461433	417,486	
27	July 4, 2024	Inside Out 2 †	₺49,573,537	299,823	
28	July 11, 2024	Despicable Me 4	₺44,955,736	267,613	
29	July 18, 2024	Despicable Me 4	₺29,228,993	176,632	
30	July 25, 2024	Deadpool & Wolverine	₺29.087.555	176.036	
31	August 1, 2024	Deadpool & Wolverine	₺83,292,847	464,402	
32	August 8, 2024	Deadpool & Wolverine	₺46,577,781	257,153	
33	August 15, 2024	Deadpool & Wolverine	₺29,428,174	162,114	
34	August 22, 2024	Deadpool & Wolverine	₺18,824,012	108,226	
35	August 29, 2024	Deadpool & Wolverine	₺14,047,517	79,378	
36	September 5, 2024	Deadpool & Wolverine	₺12,048,697	66,068	
37	September 12, 2024	Beetlejuice Beetlejuice	₺10,071,952	50,203	
38	September 19, 2024	Beetlejuice Beetlejuice	₺6,991,616	35,167	
39	September 26, 2024	Dedemin Gözyaşları	₺3,345,004	35,106	
40	October 3, 2024	Inside Out 2 †	₺4,150,880	23,767	
41	October 10, 2024	Joker: Folie à Deux	₺37,457,630	184,460	
42	October 17, 2024	Pırıl: Sayıların Gizemi	₺15,627,657	98,931	
43	October 24, 2024	Pırıl: Sayıların Gizemi	₺11,757,848	77,241	
44	October 31, 2024	Venom: The Last Dance	₺45,231,424	228,171	
45	November 7, 2024	İllegal Hayatlar: Meclis	₺32,506,965	176,384	
46	November 14, 2024	The Wild Robot	₺23,653,620	136,165	
47	November 21, 2024	Gladiator II	₺30,523,161	136,083	
48	November 28, 2024	Gladiator II	₺19,598,665	89,152	
49	December 5, 2024	Moana 2	₺65,840,626	343,859	
50	December 12, 2024	Çakallarla Dans 7	₺45,856,893	257,341	
51	December 19, 2024	Moana 2	₺30,203,922	166,407	
52	December 26, 2024	Moana 2	₺19,879,059	112,161	
53	January 2, 2025	Rafadan Tayfa: Kapadokya	₺101,273,720	594,051	

== Highest-grossing films ==
=== In-Year Release ===
Highest-grossing films of 2024 by In-year release
Rank	Title	Distributor	Domestic gross
1	Inside Out 2	UIP	₺408,493,787
2	Rafadan Tayfa 4: Hayrimator	TME Films	₺306,781,887
3	Lohusa	UIP	₺281,915,381
4	Deadpool & Wolverine	UIP	₺257,458,112
5	Kolpachino 4 quarts	A90 Pictures	₺242,322,318
6	Despicable Me 4	UIP	₺180,503,629
7	Moana 2	UIP	₺175,377,316
8	Venom: The Last Dance	TME	₺119,735,238
9	Kung Fu Panda 4	UIP	₺115,096,185
10	3391 Kilometers	A90 Pictures	₺113,910,002

== See also ==
- List of 2023 box office number-one films in Turkey
- 2024 in Turkey
- List of Turkish films of 2024

Preceded by 2023 Box office number-one films	Box office number-one films 2024	Succeeded by 2025 Box office number-one films
