= List of Turkish European Film Award winners and nominees =

This is a list of Turkish European Film Award winners and nominees. This list details the performances of Turkish actors, actresses and films that have either been submitted or nominated for, or have won, a European Film Award.

== Main categories ==
Year	Award	Recipient	Status	Note
1989	Young European Film of the Year	Mist	Nominated	Turkish-Swiss co-production
2003	European Discovery of the Year	Fuse	Nominated	Bosnian-Austrian-Turkish co-production
2004	Best Film	Head-On	Won	German-Turkish co-production
2007	Best Film	The Edge of Heaven	Nominated	German-Turkish co-production
2007	European Discovery of the Year	A Man’s Fear of God	Nominated	Turkish-German co-production
2008	European Discovery of the Year	Summer Book	Nominated	
2009	European Discovery of the Year	Autumn	Nominated	Turkish-German co-production
2010	Best European Co-Producer	Zeynep Özbatur Atakan	Won	
2010	Best Film	Honey	Nominated	
2010	Best Actress	Sibel Kekilli for When We Leave	Nominated	German born to a family of Turkish origin (renounced Turkish citizenship in 1999)
2014	Best Film	Winter Sleep	Nominated	

== See also ==
- List of Turkish submissions for the Academy Award for Best Foreign Language Film
