= Ataullah Hamidi =

Turkish politician (1954–2024)

Member of the Grand National Assembly of Turkey for Batman
- In office 17 November 2015 – 16 May 2018
- In office 8 January 1996 – 1 October 2002

Mayor of Batman
- In office 1984–1994
- Succeeded by: Salih Gök

Personal details
- Born: 19 October 1954 Beşiri, Turkey
- Died: 1 March 2024 (aged 69) Ankara, Turkey
- Party: ANAP; AKP
- Education: Dicle University
- Occupation: Farmer

Ataullah Hamidi (19 October 1954 – 1 March 2024) was a Turkish farmer and politician of Kurdish descent. A member of the Motherland Party and later the Justice and Development Party, he served in the Grand National Assembly from 1996 to 2002 and again from 2015 to 2018.

Hamidi died in Ankara on 1 March 2024, at the age of 69.
