= Beyza Bilgin =

Turkish theologian (1935–2024)

- Born: 5 May 1935
- Died: 19 November 2024 (aged 89)
- Citizenship: Turkey
- Scientific career
- Fields: Theology
- Institutions: Ankara Üniversitesi

Beyza Bilgin (5 May 1935 – 19 November 2024) was a Turkish theology professor.

== Biography ==
Bilgin was born on 5 May 1935 in İzmir. After completing her primary and high school education in Karabük, Istanbul, and Eskişehir, respectively, she studied in the Department of Chemical Engineering at Ankara University. However, after a year, she switched to the Faculty of Theology. After completing her university education in 1960, she worked as a teacher at Imam Hatip High Schools in Yozgat and Ankara. While teaching in Ankara, she worked as an honorary preacher for women in some mosques. In 1965, she started working as an assistant at Ankara University Faculty of Theology. She earned her doctorate in 1971 with her thesis on Love as the Foundation of Education in Islam, became an associate professor in 1979 with her thesis on Religious Education in Turkey and Religious Lessons in High Schools, and the first professor in the field of religious education in Turkey in 1988 with her thesis on Educational Science and Religious Education.

== Views ==
Regarding the headscarf, she stated that the 31st verse of the An-Nur in the Quran is not an order or obligation but a recommendation. She stated that the expression 'let them put their outer coverings over themselves' in the 59th verse of Al-Aḥzāb was revealed because they harassed women under the conditions of that day, considering them to be concubines, and commented as follows:

"In other words, veiling is a security issue that arose according to the needs of that period. These are not taken into consideration at all and are reflected as God's command. Women have been called God's command for a thousand years. Women said the same thing to their daughters and daughters-in-law."

She said the following about covering herself in prayer:

"They tell me, 'Do you cover yourself while praying?' Of course, I cover up when I'm in a congregation. I am obliged not to disturb the peace. But I also pray with my head uncovered in my own home. Because the Quran's requirement for prayer is not covering up, but ablution and turning towards the qibla. When I say these things, I get reactions. This is a thousand-year-old issue. It's so ingrained in us. But this should definitely not be underestimated. Because people do it thinking it is God's command. But on the other hand, we should not declare a person who does not cover up as a bad woman."

Regarding the abortion issue, she stated that Islam allows abortion and said:

"First, if the father's matter and the mother's matter meet in the womb and hold each other, they cling to the womb, and the child takes shape. If it is noticed and an abortion is performed before it takes shape, it is allowed. Ulema says, 'The soul has not been blown yet; this does not count as murder.' At that time, scholars said it was 42 days, but now doctors say it is 10 weeks. So this is allowed."

She opposed the thesis that polygamy is in men's genes and asked, "If so, why wasn't the first man, Adam, created a polygamist?"
