= Mehmet Coral =

Turkish writer (1946–2024)

Mehmet Gündüz Coral (11 September 1946 – 15 April 2024) was a Turkish novelist, known for his novels with historical settings. His works, such as Extinct Times of Byzantium (author house/USA 2000) and The Lost Diaries of Constantinople (DK Publishing 2008), are also translated to foreign languages.

== Biography ==
Coral was born in İzmir, Turkey to middle-class parents. He grew up in İzmir, which is actually the ancient Smyrna, and very much influenced by the historical surroundings of his city and nearby locations like ancient Ephesus, Pergamum, Halicarnassus. Following his spartan boarding school years in private colleges, he went on to study business administration and economics in Aegean University. After graduation, he studied at the University of Amsterdam and The Hague Academy of International Law for post graduate studies.

Coral lived in Istanbul. He died on 15 April 2024, at the age of 77.

== Novels ==
  - Extinct Times of Byzantium (Bizans'ta Kayıp Zaman-1998)
  - The Lost Diaries of Constantinople (Konstantiniye'nin Yitik Günceleri-1999)
  - Endless Breeze (Sonsuz Meltem-2000)
  - The Echo of the Universe (Isikla Yazilsin Sonsuza Adim-2001)
  - The Ashes of Smyrna (İzmir-13 Eylul 1922–2003)
  - FLYING within the boundaries of time and thought (Zamanin ve Dusuncenin Sinirlarinda UCARKEN-2003)
  - Rusty Sun (Paslı Gunes-2005)
  - Asylum Island (Timarhane Adasi-2006)
  - Operation Golden Virgin (Meryem Plani-2007)
  - Love in Alachati (Alacati'da Ask-2009)
  - Daughter of Time-Yellow Rose of Istanbul (Zamanin Kizi-Istanbul'un Sari Gulu-2010)
  - The Little Prince-The star that fell to the desert
  - Memories of old Constantinople
  - The swans of Lucerne
  - Bird may die, remember the flight
  - The diary of the Queen Constantinople
  - The Maple trees of Yenikoy

== Research ==
- Merchants of Death-International Trade in Arms (Olum Satanlar – 2000)
- The Bride of Fire (Atesin Gelini – 2008)

== Awards ==
- BAL prize in arts and Literature – 2001
- WORLD BROTHERHOOD UNION MEVLANA SUPREME FOUNDATION Prize in literature – 2010
- İzmir Metropolitan Municipality City Culture literary award – 2011
