= Tünek Tepe =

Hill in Antalya, Turkey

Tünek Tepe is a hill in the west side of the city of Antalya. Its height is 618 metres (2027 feet).

On the crest are a hotel, a revolving restaurant called "Döner Gazino" (literally "Rotating Club") and an observation terrace featuring a view of the Gulf of Antalya, the city and the surrounding mountains.

== Tünektepe Cable Car ==
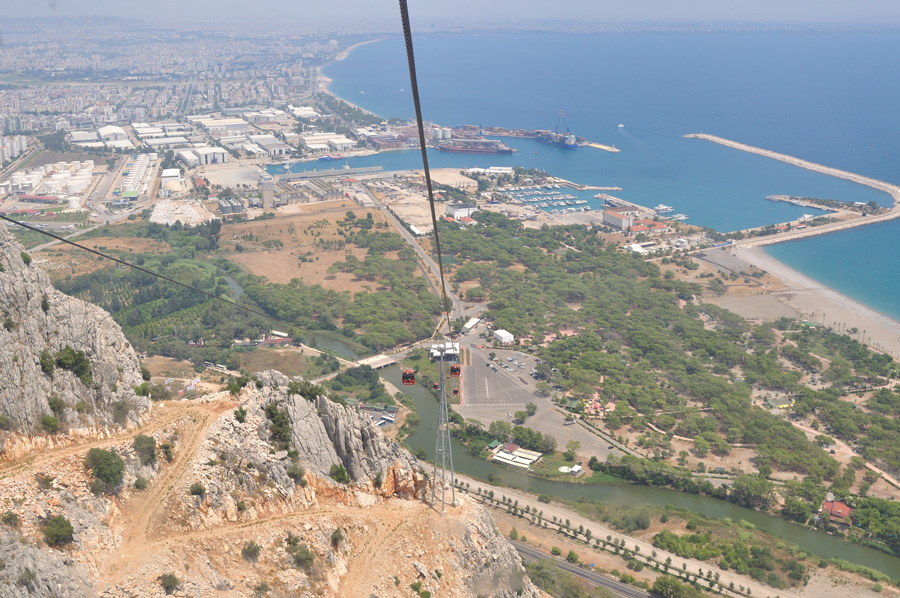
Antalya as seen from a cable car

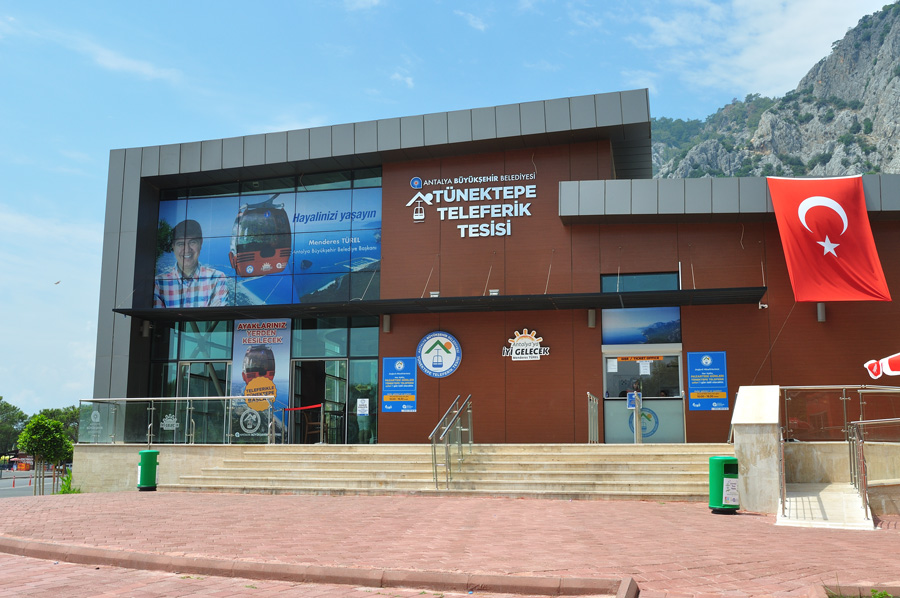
Tünektepe Cable Car lower station

The Tünektepe Cable Car (Turkish: Tünektepe Teleferik) is an aerial lift of tramway type located in Antalya, Turkey, serving the peak of Tünek Tepe hill. The cable car ride takes 15 minutes each way.

The Cable Car project was initiated in 2013 as a project to connect Tünek Tepe, the coastal hill overlooking the city of Antalya, with the Sarısu Neighborhood at the edge of the Konyaaltı district. The project cost 14 million Turkish lira.

On 12 April 2024, the Tünektepe Cable Car saw heavy use by visitors celebrating the last day of Eid al-Fitr. It was on this day, however, that disaster struck at about 17:30 local time, when one of the 30 cabins on the line struck a pole and burst open, spilling the passengers out onto the hillside. One 54-year-old man was killed, while seven other passengers were injured, two of them children. The survivors from the burst cabin were all soon rescued by Coast Guard helicopter crews, and were transferred to hospitals. The 184 passengers in the 29 other cabins, which had come to a stop because of the accident, however, had to wait many hours for rescue to arrive.
