= Deniz Göktaş =

Turkish comedian (born 1994)

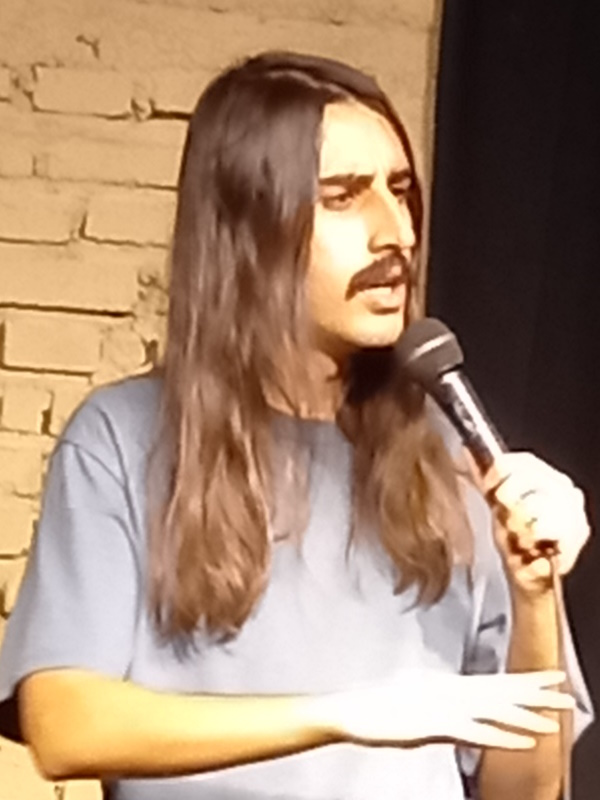
- Göktaş in 2022
- Born: İmran Deniz Göktaş; 18 April 1994 (age 32); Ankara, Turkey
- Education: Middle East Technical University; Kadir Has University
- Occupation: Comedian
- Known for: Political satire, the Ölü Deniz stand-up special, and imprisonment
- Notable work: Selam Selam (2023); Ölü Deniz (2026)
- Style: Dark humor, political satire
- Criminal charges: Insulting the President (Article 299 of the Turkish Penal Code), Publicly denigrating religious values (Article 216/3 of the Turkish Penal Code)

Comedy career
- Years active: 2019–present

İmran Deniz Göktaş (born 18 April 1994) is a Turkish stand-up comedian known for his black comedy and political jokes. After releasing a comedy special in July 2026, he was arrested by Turkish authorities on charges such as "insulting" President Recep Tayyip Erdogan. He was imprisoned for three months.

== Life ==
He was born in 1994 in the Mamak district of Ankara. He is the son of a working-class civil servant family of Çorum origin and Alevi background. He was raised in a left-wing family environment.

He began his higher education in the Department of Civil Engineering at Middle East Technical University and graduated from the Department of Psychology at the same university. He later began a Master's degree in cinema and television at Kadir Has University.

After moving to Istanbul to study cinema, he began performing stand-up comedy in 2019 through the open mic events organized by TuzBiber Comedy Club. The show, which he performed at various venues between 2020 and 2023, concluded in 2023 after being recorded at Ses Tiyatrosu under the title Selam Selam and released on YouTube.

During the COVID-19 pandemic, he began producing podcasts and became known to a wider audience. He created the podcast series Deniz Göktaş'a Ayıracak Vaktim Yok on Spotify and Haset on Deezer.

Between 2020 and 2023, he wrote humorous columns for Uykusuz magazine.

He made a guest appearance in one episode of the television series Gibi. He also acted in the short film Ben Tek Siz Hepiniz (2022).

== Arrest ==
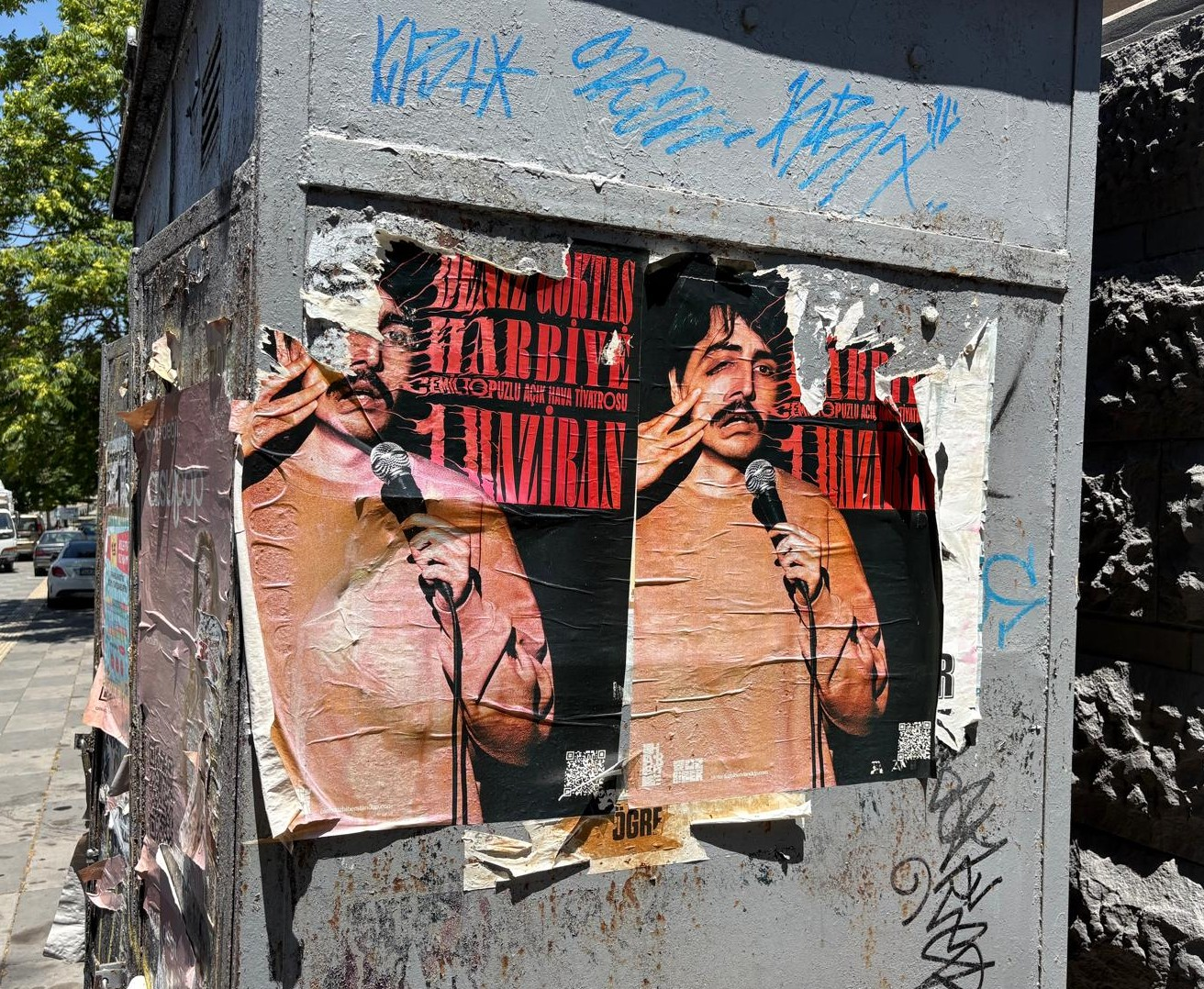
Promotional poster in Ankara for Göktaş's 2026 show

Göktaş's stand-up special "Ölü Deniz", performed at the Harbiye Cemil Topuzlu Open-Air Theatre on 1 June 2026 and released on YouTube on 24 June 2026, surpassed 10 million views within one week.

The Istanbul Chief Public Prosecutor's Office launched an investigation under Article 216/3 of the Turkish Penal Code on the allegation of "publicly denigrating the religious values adopted by a section of the public," after determining that the content contained elements of a criminal offense. The office noted that 185 complaints had been made on the content of the stand-up show. The investigation was later expanded to include the charge of "insulting the president" under Article 299 of the Turkish Penal Code, due to Göktaş referring to Recep Tayyip Erdoğan as a "dictator".

Following the release of the special, Göktaş, who was on vacation abroad, returned to Turkey after social media claims that he had fled the country. He was detained during passport control upon entering the country through Istanbul Airport on 2 July 2026. In his statements to the police and prosecutors, the comedian denied the allegations, stating that his remarks were entirely intended as humor and satire and that he had no intention of insulting or denigrating anyone.

On 3 July 2026, he was remanded in custody by the Criminal Court of Peace to which he was referred at the Istanbul Çağlayan Courthouse and was sent to prison. In its reasoned decision, the court argued that the statements in the performance exceeded the limits of criticism, damaged the honor and dignity of the President, denigrated the religious values embraced by a large section of the public, and had the potential to incite hatred and hostility.

He spent three months before his trial in October 2026. He was convicted and sentenced to 19 months, but was released and offered a chance to appeal the verdict.
