= Nevin Efe =

Turkish actress (1947–2026)

- Born: 5 March 1947
- Died: 6 February 2026 (aged 78)

Nevin Efe (5 March 1947 – 6 February 2026) was a Turkish actress.

== Life and career ==
Efe was born in Istanbul on 5 March 1947. Throughout her career she acted in a number of television series including Valley of the Wolves: Ambush, Aşk ve Ceza, and Arka Sokaklar.

Nevin Efe died on 6 February 2026, at the age of 78. Her funeral was held at Ferhatpaşa Cemetery in Çatalca.
