= Selçuk Ayhan =

Turkish politician (1953–2024)

Member of the Grand National Assembly of Turkey for İzmir Province
- In office 23 July 2007 – 23 April 2011

Personal details
- Born: 16 October 1953 Dinar, Turkey
- Died: 7 November 2024 (aged 71) İzmir, Turkey
- Party: CHP
- Education: Ege University
- Occupation: Mechanical engineer

Selçuk Ayhan (16 October 1953 – 7 November 2024) was a Turkish mechanical engineer and politician. A member of the Republican People's Party, he served in the Grand National Assembly from 2007 to 2011.

Ayhan died of hyperglycemia in İzmir, on 7 November 2024, at the age of 71.
