= Münci Kalayoğlu =

Turkish physician (1940–2024)

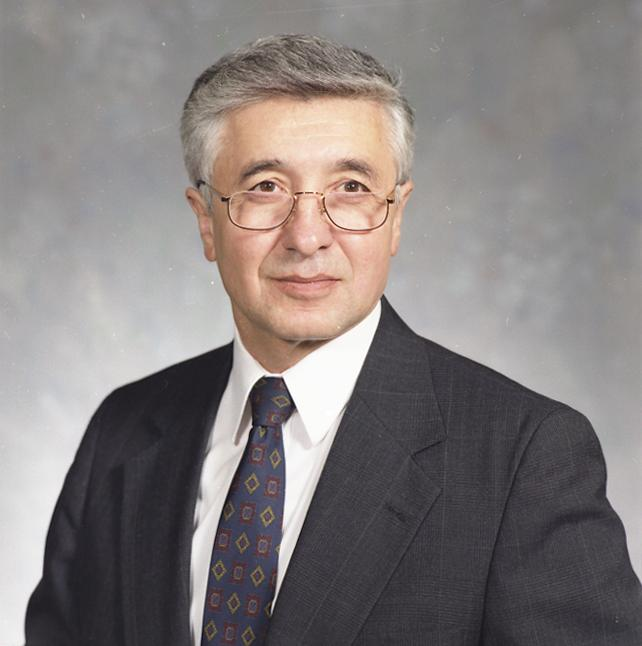
Image of Münci Kalayoğlu

Münci Kalayoğlu (7 May 1940 – 17 November 2024) was a Turkish doctor.

== Life and career ==
Kalayoğlu was born in Ankara in 1940. In 1963 he graduated from Ankara University School of Medicine, after which he studied at Hacettepe University School of Medicine. He became an intern at the Mount Sinai Medical School in New York and Pittsburg Child Hospital. He was the founder and president of the Department of Liver Transplantation at the University of Wisconsin. He made more than 1500 liver transplants throughout his career.

He published 185 works, including 22 articles in international medical journals. From 2006 he was the head of a private hospital.

Kalayoğlu died on 17 November 2024, at the age of 84.
