= Armand Shkullaku =

Albanian journalist

Armand Shkullaku is an Albanian journalist, editor in chief of ABC News Albania and president of Association of Professional Journalists of Albania.
