= Emin Fuat Keyman =

Turkish political scientist (1958–2024)

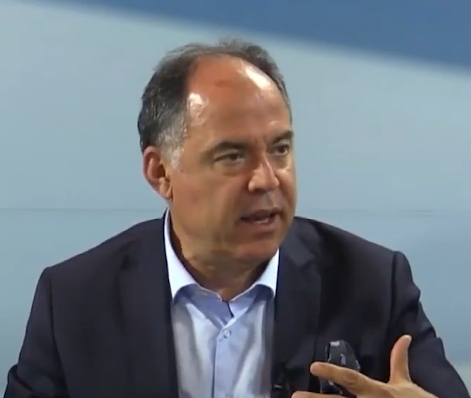
- Born: 1958; Ankara, Turkey
- Died: 18 October 2024 (aged 65)
- Education: Middle East Technical University (BA, MA); Carleton University (PhD)
- Occupation: Political scientist
- Employer(s): Bilkent University; Koç University; Sabancı University

Emin Fuat Keyman (1958 – 18 October 2024) was a Turkish academic and political scientist.

Keyman was Director of Istanbul Policy Center and Professor of International Relations at Sabancı University. He died in October 2024, at the age of 65.
