= 2026 Aliağa factory explosion =

Industrial accident in Turkey

- Location of the HABAŞ plant in İzmir Province
- Date: 9 November 2026
- Time: 11:46 a.m. (TRT (UTC+3))
- Location: HABAŞ Demir Çelik plant, Bozköy, Aliağa, İzmir Province, Turkey; 38°45′05.3″N 26°57′00.6″E
- Type: Industrial accident
- Cause: Overhead crane collapsed into an electric arc furnace during casting (preliminary finding)
- Deaths: 19
- Injuries: 12
- Inquiries: Judicial investigation by the Menemen Chief Public Prosecutor's Office; Ministry of Labour inspection
- Arrests: 6

On 9 November 2026, an explosion and fire at the HABAŞ Demir Çelik iron and steel plant in Aliağa, in Turkey's İzmir Province, killed 19 workers and injured at least 12 others.

A crane carrying a replacement boiler collapsed into an electric arc furnace during the casting of molten steel, setting off a blast and a fire that destroyed part of the casting platform and damaged a natural gas line. HABAŞ described the accident as occurring during scheduled maintenance on one of its arc furnaces. Search and rescue work continued that evening for workers trapped beneath the wreckage.

== Explosion ==
At the time of the explosion, around 200 workers were present at the factory, with 100 more having stayed home because of a boiler replacement operation. The blast struck at 11:46 a.m. local time (UTC+3). An overhead crane collapsed while molten steel was being poured and fell into an electric arc furnace. Governor Süleyman Elban said that the crane was carrying the replacement boiler when it collapsed, sending equipment into the furnace below.

According to a worker's account to Agence France-Presse, the crane's rope snapped, knocking down the replacement boiler that it had been holding up and spilling around 120 tonnes of molten steel onto the furnace, which came into contact with its water-cooled panels and caused a hydrogen explosion.

One witness who was driving past initially thought an earthquake had struck, saying: "It felt like the ground was shifting beneath us". Another witness reported that the roof of the plant was "flowing like water as it burned". Videos from the site showed flames inside the works and a tall column of black smoke; a fire broke out at the chimney. A natural gas line was also damaged.

Emergency crews fought the fire and worked to remove the collapsed casting platform, while search teams looked for workers pinned under the debris.

== Background ==
HABAŞ Demir Çelik is the steelmaking arm of HABAŞ (Habaş Sınai ve Tıbbi Gazlar İstihsal Endüstrisi A.Ş.), a privately owned Turkish group whose Aliağa operations also include port facilities. It is one of the country's largest steel producers. The plant is located on the Yeni Foça road about 60 kilometres (37 mi) north of İzmir and has operated since 1987. Aliağa is a heavy-industrial district and one of Turkey's main ship breaking centres.

The plant has a long record of fatal and serious accidents. Evrensel said that no fewer than 11 workers had died at the plant in the last decade. The previous deadliest incident was in 1999, when a falling ladle killed four workers. Two deaths came in the weeks before the November 2026 blast. Hakan Doğan, 55, died on 21 October 2026 after falling about 8 metres (26 ft) from a ladder while working for a subcontractor, and Eyüp Eğinli was killed on 5 November 2026 when a heavy vehicle tyre exploded while being inflated.

The disaster fed a wider argument about workplace safety in Turkey. The independent Health and Safety Labour Watch (İSİG) counted more than 200 worker deaths in each of the five months to September 2026, the first such run since it began publishing figures in 2013.

== Casualties ==
Initial reports put the number of casualties at three dead, fourteen injured and ten trapped. Governor Süleyman Elban later put the death toll at ten and the injures at 15, four of them critical. After a cabinet meeting, President Recep Tayyip Erdoğan announced that the death toll rose to sixteen, with thirteen injured, two critically. Health minister Kemal Memişoğlu then announced that one of the critically injured had died. Another body was later discovered by rescuers, bringing the death toll to eighteen. According to deputy justice minister Can Tuncay, the victims' cause of death was severe burns. On 13 November, the body of Barış Güney, who was initially reported missing, was identified, thus raising the death toll to 19.

İzmir's mayor, Cemil Tugay, cautioned that the exact number of casualties would emerge only once the wreckage had been cleared.

== Investigation ==
Erdoğan promised that "how and why it happened, whether there was any negligence and who bears responsibility" would be established. The Menemen Chief Public Prosecutor's Office, which covers Aliağa, assigned four prosecutors and a panel of expert witnesses, and the Ministry of Labour and Social Security appointed a chief inspector to examine occupational safety and the company's procedures.

Five people were initially detained in connection with the blast, with the number rising to six by the evening of 9 November. On 10 November, HABAŞ Chairman Mehmet Rüştü Başaran was arrested in Istanbul; ten others were still wanted.

== Reactions ==
Three ministers travelled to Aliağa and inspected the plant: Minister of the Interior Mustafa Çiftçi, Minister of Labour Vedat Işıkhan, and Memişoğlu. Minister of Industry and Technology Mehmet Fatih Kacır, offered condolences to the workers' families.

The pro-Kurdish Peoples' Equality and Democracy Party demanded that the causes, any negligence and any failure of oversight be brought out transparently, stating "not a single responsible party must go unpunished". Its co-chair Tülay Hatimoğulları was due at the site on 10 November. The Labour Party and İSİG pointed to the plant's record, and Türk Metal's Aliağa representative had recounted the 1999 ladle deaths in a 2018 statement.

Relatives of the victims gathered outside the plant and at Aliağa State Hospital, where the injured were taken. Riot police were deployed outside the hospital, where two representatives of the Aegean Workers' Collective were detained while protesting for workplace safety. The sibling of a deceased victim set himself on fire outside the factory and was taken to hospital by bystanders. On 10 November, around 700 people protested in Aliağa, 150 in Istanbul, and 300 in Ankara.

== See also ==
- Amasra mine explosion
- Soma mine disaster
- List of industrial disasters
