= Sustainable Governance Indicators =

The Sustainable Governance Indicators (SGI), first published in spring 2009 and updated in 2011, analyze and compare the need for reform in Organisation for Economic Co-operation and Development (OECD) member countries, as well as each country's ability to respond to current social and political challenges. The project is designed to create a comprehensive data pool on government-related activities in the countries considered the world's most developed free-market democracies. In addition, it uses international comparisons to provide evidence-based input for reform-related public discourse taking place in these countries. The SGI are updated every two or three years.

== Behind the project ==
The Bertelsmann Foundation is an operational think tank that encourages social change and aims to foster sustainability by identifying nascent challenges early on and by developing strategies to face these issues.

== Method ==
Three scholars with established country expertise are involved in the analysis of each OECD state under review. In an attempt to identify and reduce subjective bias, the SGI project selects experts representing both domestic and external views as well as the viewpoints of political scientists and economists. Comparative political scientists with area expertise then integrate the two expert reports into a single country report, and select information according to certain validity and objectivity criteria.

== SGI and the Transformation Index ==
The SGI concept is inspired by the Bertelsmann Foundation’s Transformation Index (BTI). The Transformation Index focuses on 128 countries—all of which are transitioning to a market-based democracy or potentially headed in that direction—and assesses the extent to which political management fulfils criteria regarding sustainability, democracy founded on the rule of law, social integration and welfare. Since 2002, the BTI has been documenting the progress 128 transformation countries have been making toward democracy and a market economy. Using a similar approach to BTI, the SGI evaluate the extent to which OECD member states are in a position, given changing domestic and international conditions, to implement the reforms necessary for ensuring their future viability. By measuring the need for reform along with the effectiveness of existing initiatives, the SGI aims to identify the best policy solutions for promoting democracy and a market economy.

== Infrastructure of the SGI ==
The need for reform within a country is analyzed in the Sustainable Governance Indicators in the Status Index, while the capacity for reform is analyzed in the Management Index.

=== Status Index ===
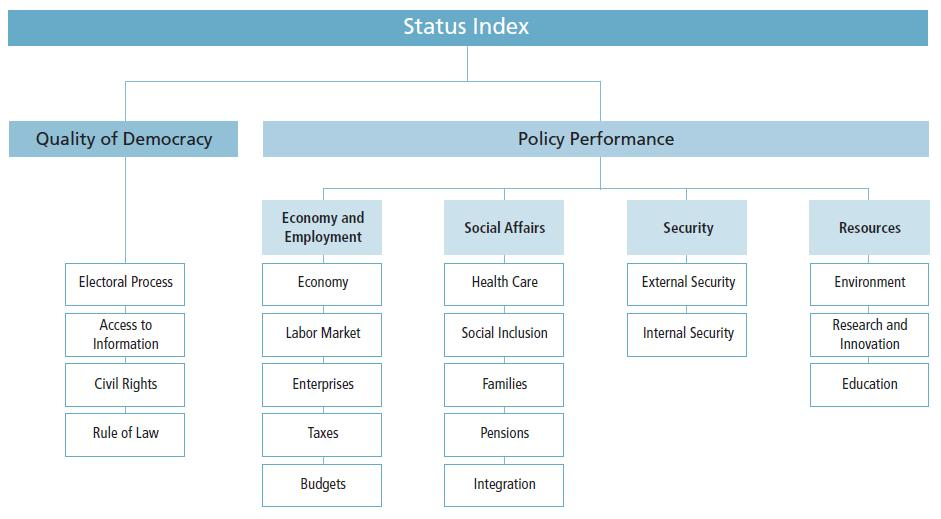
Construction of the SGI Status Index

Status Index scores are composite measures, based on numerous quantitative and qualitative assessments. The democracy category counts for half of the index score, while the four policy-specific categories collectively provide the remainder.

The Status Index analyzes the need for reform through two principle dimensions:

- The first dimension of the Status Index maps the quality of democracy within a country and examines four criteria: "Electoral Process," "Access to Information," "Civil Rights," and "Rule of Law."
- The second dimension of the Status Index corresponds to the OECD states' competencies in policy fields that are highly relevant for future viability. The index examines fields such as "Economy and Employment," "Social Affairs," "Security," and "Resources," which include 15 different policy areas.

=== Management Index ===
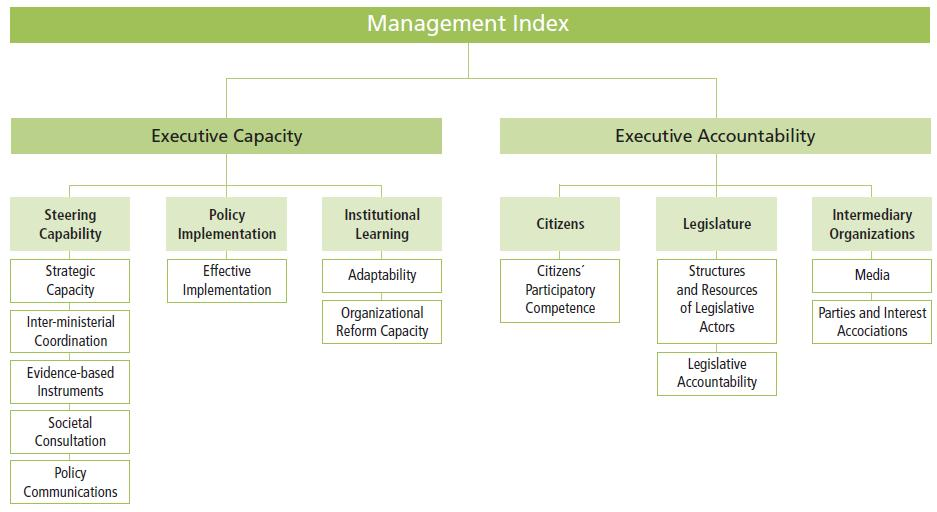
Construction of the SGI Management Index

Management Index scores are composite measures, based on numerous quantitative and qualitative assessments. The three categories "Steering Capability," "Policy Implementation" and "Institutional Learning" collectively count for half of the index score, while the Executive Accountability dimension provides the remaining half. The Management Index considers, in relative terms, how capable governments and societies are of effective reform.

The Management Index examines government performance and analyzes a country's reform capacity through two dimensions:

- The first dimension, Executive Capacity, measures the strategic steering and problem solving capabilities of the respective OECD states. Thus, Executive Capacity analyzes a government's organizational structures and processes. The main analytical categories used were "Steering Capability," "Policy Implementation" and "Institutional Learning."
- The second dimension, Executive Accountability, looks at how the government interacts with external state and non-state actors (Citizens, parliaments, political parties, trade associations and media) and measures to what extent these actors positively influence the executive branch.

== Results ==
=== Status Index 2011 ===
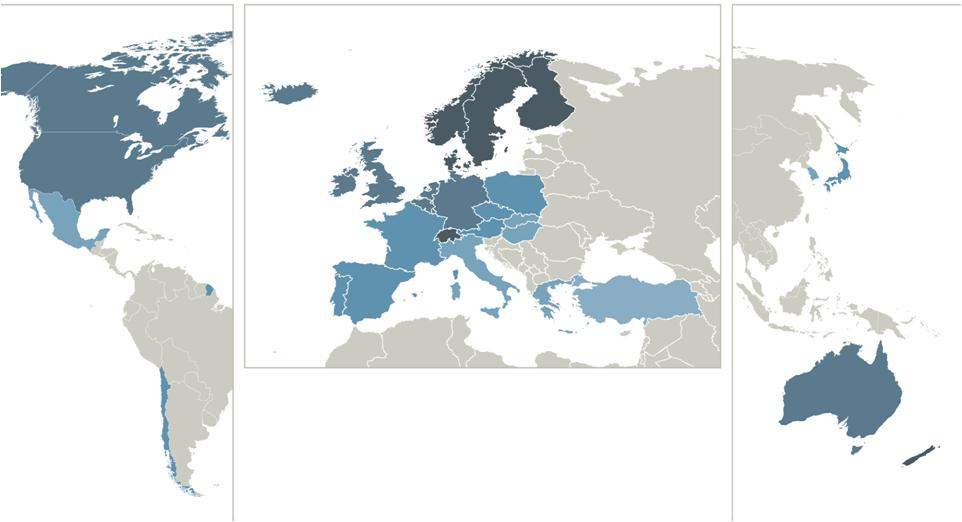
Status Index results 2011; results displayed on a scale from 1 (worst) to 10 (best) Score < 4 Score > 4 Score > 5 Score > 6 Score > 7 Score > 8

The top rankings of the Status Index are dominated by northern European countries. At the same time, the leading group also includes New Zealand, with its British heritage, and continental European Switzerland, two nations with different political and state welfare traditions.

The group of mid-range scorers (Canada, Australia, Germany, Iceland, Luxembourg, Netherlands, United States, Ireland, United Kingdom, Belgium, Austria, Czech Republic, France, Portugal, Japan, Chile, Spain, and Poland) and the lowest-ranking group (South Korea, Italy, Slovakia, Mexico, Greece, and Turkey) are geographically and culturally just as heterogeneous as the top group. Standard typologies in comparative political science are insufficient to explain the Status Index ranking of the OECD nations. For example, majoritarian democracies do not systematically score better or worse than consensus democracies. Classifying the countries as federalist and centralist states also fails to help explain the differences in reform capacity. The top group includes, above all, social democratic welfare states such as the Scandinavian countries. However, liberal welfare states also achieve high scores, with New Zealand, Switzerland and Canada in the upper mid-range. In general, the findings of the Status Index reveal higher scores among long-term, established OECD members – although there are exceptions: Chile, a new member, places in the lower midrange, while Italy and Greece rank significantly lower than some Eastern European countries. This suggests that the smaller, more open national economies tend to pursue especially sustainable policies.

=== Management Index 2011 ===
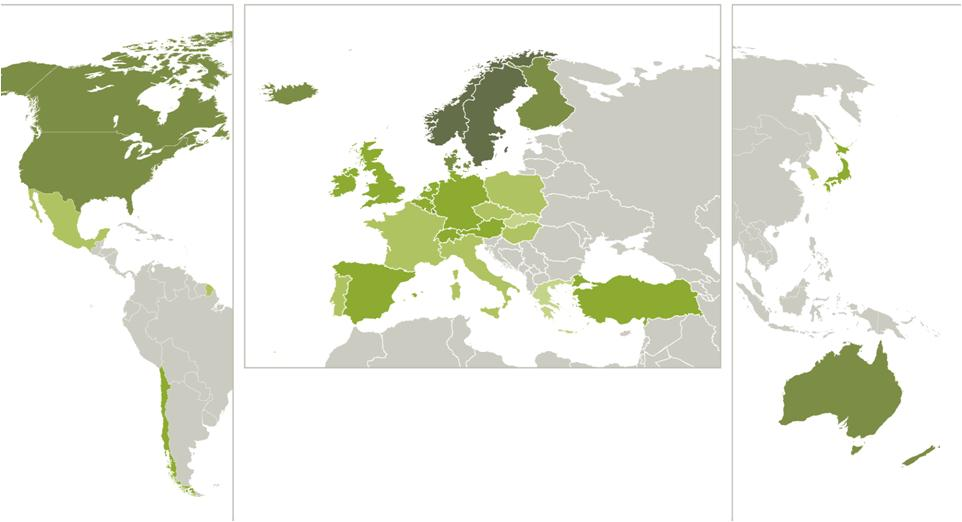
Management Index results 2011; results displayed on a scale from 1 (worst) to 10 (best) Score < 4 Score > 4 Score > 5 Score > 6 Score > 7 Score > 8

At the highest level of aggregation in the Management Index, the overview provides important initial indications of which countries exhibit the best performance of governance overall and which countries show deficiencies. Background information in greater depth on the performance of a given country can be found in the country reports on the SGI website. These include substantiated, qualitative information right down to the level of individual indicators.

The SGI Management Indicators are clearly led by Sweden and Norway, each with average scores exceeded 8 points. Next come Denmark, Finland, New Zealand and Australia. While the overall ranking of northern European countries is again outstanding, as observed in the Status Index, this sequence also underscores the fact that no particular system type is favored in the Management Index. This top group is followed by a broad mid-range in which the changes in index scores are incremental, leaving no discernible clusters. Clearly bringing up the rear of the survey are Greece and Slovakia. Both countries trail Italy, which is 29th in the ranking, by nearly an entire point. The new OECD member Chile stands out positively, already scoring higher than some established, longstanding OECD states.

=== Summary of results ===
The central finding of the SGI is that the quality of governance is most important in ensuring sustainable policy outcomes. Countries with "good executive management performance, a sound democratic order and an effective inclusion of societal actors into policymaking processes are more successful in terms of sustainability and also in terms of social justice."

== See also ==
- Bertelsmann Stiftung
- Debt Sustainability Analysis
- Fiscal sustainability
- Good Governance
- Sustainability
- Sustainability measurement
