= Balkan Trust for Democracy =

Foundation based in Belgrade, Serbia

- Formation: March, 2003 (15 years ago)
- Founder: German Marshall Fund of the United States; USAID; Charles Stewart Mott Foundation
- Founded at: Belgrade, Serbia
- Type: foundation
- Legal status: Active
- Purpose: Grant-making, Policy debate and Leadership development
- Headquarters: Belgrade
- Location: Serbia
- Region served: Southeastern Europe
- Official language: English and Serbian
- Executive Director: Gordana Delić-Petrović
- Parent organization: German Marshall Fund
- Website: www.gmfus.org/program/balkan-trust-democracy

Balkan Trust for Democracy (abbreviation: BTD) is a foundation based in Belgrade, Serbia. It was founded in March 2003 by the German Marshall Fund of the United States, the United States Agency for International Development (USAID), and the Charles Stewart Mott Foundation.

== History ==
Balkan Trust for Democracy was founded in March 2003 by German Marshall Fund of the United States, the United States Agency for International Development (USAID), and the Charles Stewart Mott Foundation, receiving a US$30 million donation. Other donors included Rockefeller Brothers Fund, Tipping Point Foundation, Compagnia di San Paolo, Robert Bosch Foundation, Swedish International Development Cooperation Agency, and the foreign affairs ministries of Denmark and Greece.

The NGO's first mandate lasted for ten years (2003-2013) while its second is running for seven (2013-2020), with changes to its geographical and grant-making scope. During the first mandate, the organization covered Albania, Bosnia and Herzegovina, Bulgaria, Croatia, Kosovo, Macedonia, Montenegro, Moldova, Romania, and Serbia. From 2013, its geographical scope was reduced to Albania, Bosnia and Herzegovina, Kosovo, Macedonia, Montenegro, and Serbia.

== Programs ==
Balkan Trust for Democracy supports three types of programs; grant-making, policy dialogue, and leadership development.

=== Grant-making ===
Grants are given to various organizations, with a focus on Western Balkans. BTD accepts proposals and awards grants of between $5,000 to $75,000. In the grant program's first year it supported over 60 projects.

=== Policy dialogue ===
The primary focus of the policy dialogue program is to connect Western Balkan actors with various European Union, US, and other international actors. This includes a "Travel to Europe Program" that started in 2007, together with the Robert Bosch Foundations, and aims to enable student travel to the EU. Another example is the "Kosovo-Serbia Professional Exchange Program", which is implemented with the support British Foreign and Commonwealth Office and in partnership with the British Embassies in Belgrade and Priština with the aim of connecting of various professionals.

=== Leadership development ===
The aim of this program is to train, network, and enable the travel of future leaders of the Balkans by implementing the Young Transatlantic Network, the Marshall Memorial Fellowship Program, and the Transatlantic Inclusion Leaders Network.

== See more ==
- European Western Balkans
