= Bertelsmann Transformation Index =

Benchmark for democracy and market economy

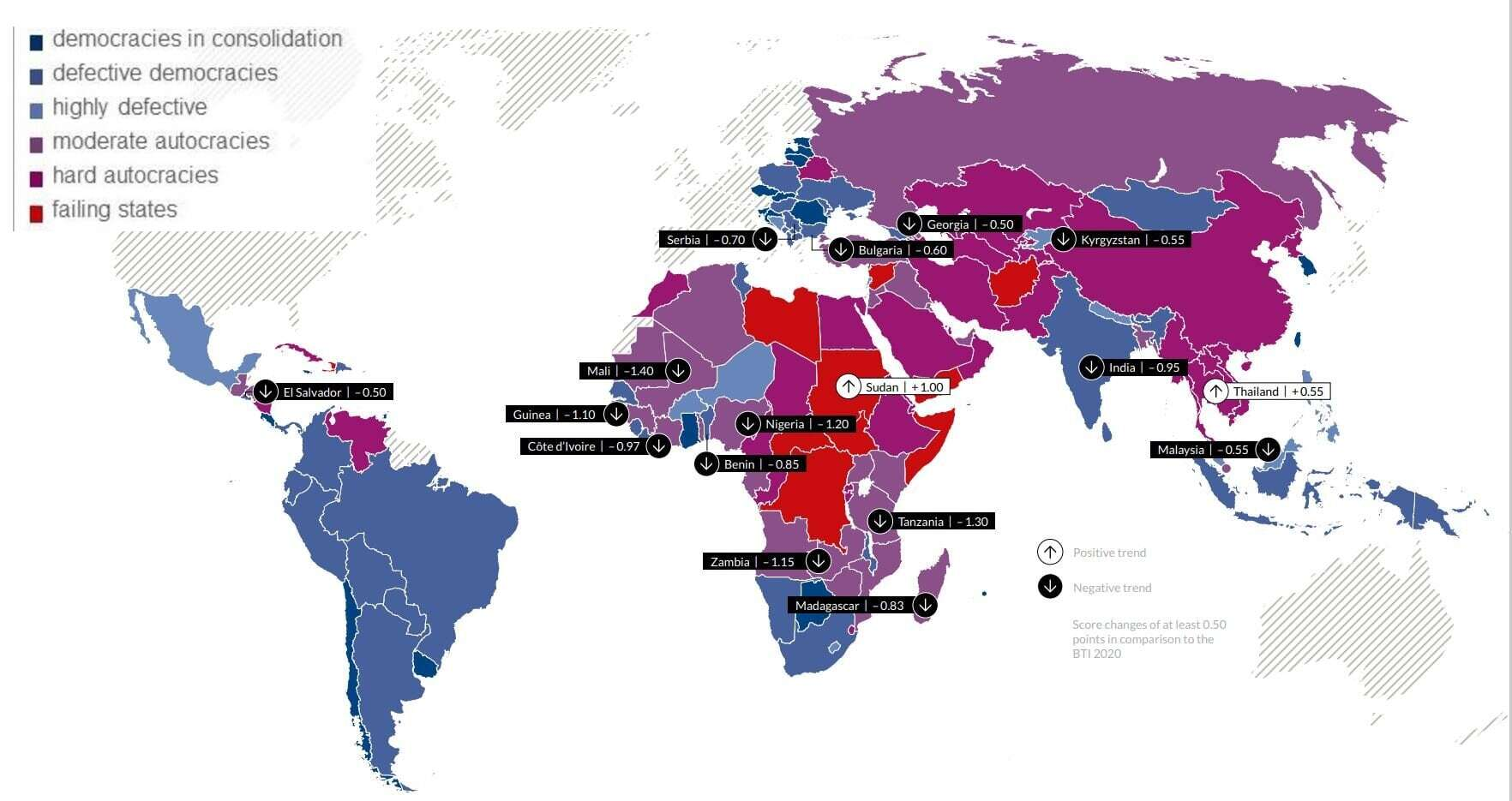
Global trend report analyzes the results of the Bertelsmann Stiftung's Transformation Index BTI 2022.

The Bertelsmann Transformation Index (BTI) is a measure of the development status and governance of political and economic transformation processes in developing and transition countries around the world. The BTI has been published biennially by the Bertelsmann Stiftung since 2005, most recently in early 2026 on 137 countries.

The index measures and compares the quality of government action in a ranking list based on self-recorded data and analyzes successes and setbacks on the path to constitutional democracy and a market economy accompanied by sociopolitical support. For this purpose, the "Status Index" is calculated on the general level of development with regard to democratic and market-economy characteristics and the "Management Index" on the political management of decision-makers.

== Status and Management Index ==
The Bertelsmann Transformation Index publishes two rankings. The Status Index is composed of the study dimensions Political and Economic Transformation. Political transformation includes essential features of a democratic state order. This includes participation rights, the rule of law, the stability of democratic institutions and the political and social integration of institutions, but also statehood as a basic condition for the functioning of a democracy. Economic transformation takes into account not only the classic market-economy characteristics such as economic performance, market and competition regulation, currency and price stability and the protection of private property, but also social components such as the level of socio-economic development, the social order and ecological and educational sustainability.

The Management Index assesses the extent to which political decision-makers can steer and promote the transformation process. It is composed of the criteria steering capability, resource efficiency, consensus building and international cooperation. In calculating the Management Index, the degree of difficulty is taken into account, such as structural obstacles, civil society traditions and the intensity of conflict.

=== Bertelsmann Transformation Indices by country ===
The following list shows the Bertelsmann Transformation Indices since 2016 till 2024.

Country	Status Index 2024	Governance Index 2024	Status Index 2022	Governance Index 2022	Status Index 2020	Governance Index 2020	Status Index 2018	Governance Index 2018	Status Index 2016	Governance Index 2016
Afghanistan	2.09	3.13	2.92	4.02	3.21	4.36	2.95	4.02	2.95	3.88
Albania	7.27	6.56	6.68	6.28	6.84	5.95	6.83	6.02	6.71	5.77
Algeria	5.00	4.46	5.04	4.67	5.03	4.41	4.98	4.55	5.11	4.50
Angola	4.51	4.60	4.21	4.46	4.16	4.23	3.94	3.60	4.16	3.61
Argentina	6.48	4.70	6.73	5.52	7.29	6.10	7.27	6.00	6.65	4.78
Armenia	6.61	5.03	6.43	4.93	6.69	5.29	5.58	4.25	5.56	4.31
Azerbaijan	4.56	3.83	4.47	3.98	4.34	4.00	4.13	3.86	4.44	3.76
Bahrain	4.52	3.87	4.50	3.73	4.63	3.24	4.62	3.52	4.96	3.86
Bangladesh	4.45	3.66	4.82	4.57	5.05	4.50	5.11	4.27	5.39	4.38
Belarus	4.25	2.22	4.61	2.78	4.89	3.71	4.72	3.52	4.27	3.02
Benin	5.47	5.80	6.08	5.85	6.43	6.06	6.43	5.86	6.28	5.42
Bhutan	6.46	6.66	6.38	6.69	6.28	6.67	6.25	6.50	6.02	6.58
Bolivia	6.04	5.37	6.17	5.54	6.22	5.45	6.46	5.66	6.58	5.63
Bosnia and Herzegovina	5.92	3.64	5.93	3.78	6.11	3.80	6.28	4.09	6.38	4.10
Botswana	7.41	6.69	7.59	6.81	8.00	7.25	7.89	7.09	7.84	7.04
Brazil	6.75	3.80	6.83	4.42	7.15	5.58	7.29	5.95	7.60	6.76
Bulgaria	7.42	5.65	7.46	5.87	7.76	6.18	7.80	5.98	7.91	6.02
Burkina Faso	4.19	4.76	5.10	5.24	5.35	5.23	5.45	5.20	4.71	4.92
Burundi	3.54	3.54	3.38	3.25	3.49	3.23	3.97	3.29	4.36	4.07
Cambodia	3.87	3.21	3.86	3.05	4.00	3.14	4.00	3.23	4.12	3.42
Cameroon	4.09	3.93	4.11	3.95	4.08	3.56	4.23	3.46	4.26	3.63
Central African Republic	3.28	4.06	3.11	3.81	3.28	4.08	3.28	4.10	2.89	4.28
Chad	2.72	2.31	3.07	2.63	3.15	2.55	3.31	2.84	3.50	2.79
Chile	8.88	7.08	8.74	7.15	8.86	7.33	8.87	7.33	8.77	7.51
China	4.75	5.00	4.94	5.29	5.04	4.71	5.02	4.79	4.95	4.73
Colombia	6.57	5.74	6.45	5.24	6.67	5.71	6.59	6.14	6.65	6.13
Democratic Republic of the Congo	3.37	2.87	3.24	2.65	3.17	2.58	3.13	2.47	3.09	2.76
Republic of the Congo	3.32	2.91	3.32	2.93	3.36	2.93	3.38	3.00	3.58	3.43
Costa Rica	8.45	7.10	8.37	7.13	8.49	6.92	8.49	6.85	8.49	6.93
Croatia	8.56	6.17	8.13	5.98	7.91	6.04	8.07	6.07	7.93	6.39
Cuba	3.38	4.05	3.70	4.46	3.77	3.95	4.02	3.93	4.15	4.12
Czech Republic	9.21	6.87	9.31	6.64	9.57	7.08	9.52	7.03	9.40	6.85
Djibouti	3.93	5.17	4.12	5.17	4.16	5.10	-	-	-	-
Dominican Republic	6.77	6.08	6.32	5.84	6.36	5.75	6.44	5.57	6.44	5.69
East Timor	6.22	5.90	6.09	5.78	6.15	5.93	-	-	-	-
Ecuador	6.14	4.93	6.23	4.88	6.48	5.22	5.72	4.99	5.55	4.48
Egypt	3.94	3.71	4.13	3.77	4.20	3.85	4.28	3.96	4.40	4.44
El Salvador	5.69	4.28	6.46	5.63	6.80	6.54	6.88	6.57	6.90	6.79
Equatorial Guinea	2.98	3.52	2.97	3.33	3.02	3.41	-	-	-	-
Eritrea	1.62	1.04	1.68	1.12	1.70	1.20	1.84	1.13	1.71	1.13
Estonia	9.52	7.35	9.47	7.02	9.54	7.46	9.52	7.44	9.49	7.40
Eswatini	3.63	2.68	3.56	3.06	3.51	3.11	-	-	-	-
Ethiopia	3.77	4.15	3.57	4.26	3.82	4.96	3.33	3.65	3.55	3.49
Gabon	5.03	4.57	4.83	4.53	4.89	4.86	-	-	-	-
Gambia	6.17	5.90	5.92	5.73	5.84	5.98	-	-	-	-
Georgia	5.79	5.21	6.00	5.55	6.39	5.83	6.42	5.87	6.31	5.72
Ghana	6.53	6.34	6.79	6.23	6.71	6.26	6.75	6.18	6.88	6.41
Guatemala	4.47	3.38	4.50	3.36	4.47	3.58	5.08	4.52	5.13	4.62
Guinea	4.29	5.09	4.60	5.07	5.33	5.98	5.28	5.82	5.08	5.83
Guinea-Bissau	4.52	3.95	5.01	4.30	5.32	4.60	-	-	-	-
Haiti	2.47	2.62	3.34	2.94	3.59	3.33	3.50	3.39	3.46	3.44
Honduras	4.91	4.47	4.71	4.00	4.94	4.33	5.51	4.98	5.94	5.56
Hungary	6.56	3.79	6.62	3.86	6.99	4.13	7.43	4.44	7.69	4.67
India	5.84	5.03	5.88	5.15	6.70	5.92	6.96	6.02	6.96	6.16
Indonesia	6.19	5.48	6.14	5.17	6.28	5.39	6.25	5.45	6.47	5.58
Iran	2.57	1.56	2.83	1.70	2.83	1.79	3.15	2.85	2.98	2.73
Iraq	4.06	4.90	3.80	4.95	4.04	5.00	3.75	4.43	3.53	4.26
Ivory Coast	5.05	5.60	4.97	5.40	5.49	5.45	5.38	5.54	5.09	5.13
Jamaica	7.10	5.82	7.19	5.79	7.29	5.86	7.31	5.86	7.20	5.99
Jordan	4.87	4.80	4.98	4.84	5.14	4.84	5.22	4.84	5.09	4.74
Kazakhstan	4.94	4.56	4.91	4.56	4.91	4.54	4.70	4.41	4.88	4.27
Kenya	5.84	4.94	5.33	4.84	5.16	4.48	5.80	4.92	5.80	5.00
Kosovo	6.42	5.22	6.33	5.45	6.20	5.21	6.21	5.17	6.33	5.19
Kuwait	5.77	4.84	5.79	4.86	5.94	4.52	5.61	4.37	5.85	4.29
Kyrgyzstan	4.98	4.06	5.49	4.42	5.87	4.56	5.90	4.73	5.71	4.78
Laos	3.47	4.08	3.73	4.23	3.88	3.96	3.85	3.89	3.83	3.68
Latvia	8.78	7.22	8.80	7.11	8.75	7.00	8.68	7.00	8.63	6.97
Lebanon	4.45	2.87	4.68	3.05	5.36	3.98	5.15	3.60	5.74	3.95
Lesotho	5.45	4.60	5.05	3.84	5.03	3.58	5.19	3.59	5.33	4.04
Liberia	5.16	4.93	5.28	5.01	5.48	5.36	5.56	5.84	5.54	6.16
Libya	2.19	2.44	2.43	2.45	2.53	2.31	2.60	2.29	2.64	2.47
Lithuania	9.29	7.45	9.27	7.21	9.30	7.18	9.24	7.18	9.15	7.19
Madagascar	4.47	4.76	4.50	4.94	5.04	5.38	5.01	5.12	4.97	4.86
Malawi	5.54	5.14	5.47	5.64	5.41	4.69	5.49	5.61	5.55	5.63
Malaysia	6.24	4.87	6.24	5.15	6.57	5.71	6.00	5.20	6.21	5.46
Mali	3.75	3.60	4.36	4.66	5.06	5.19	5.14	5.17	5.18	5.40
Mauritania	4.32	4.11	4.30	4.00	4.22	4.00	4.22	4.06	4.35	4.20
Mauritius	7.71	6.33	8.17	6.76	8.26	6.73	8.25	6.64	8.09	6.74
Mexico	5.74	4.40	6.01	4.69	6.20	5.02	6.23	5.17	6.40	5.34
Moldova	6.37	5.69	5.91	4.99	5.78	4.87	5.96	5.15	6.24	5.31
Mongolia	6.55	5.83	6.45	5.90	6.65	5.87	6.59	5.96	6.61	5.83
Montenegro	7.12	5.93	6.96	6.23	7.21	6.63	7.35	6.49	7.48	6.46
Morocco	4.54	4.63	4.77	4.84	4.70	4.40	4.61	4.28	4.60	4.37
Mozambique	4.23	4.28	4.11	4.21	4.24	4.41	4.31	4.25	5.23	5.00
Myanmar	1.83	1.62	3.20	3.53	3.28	3.59	3.38	3.97	2.98	4.20
Namibia	6.26	4.88	6.49	5.07	6.46	5.15	6.50	5.49	7.05	6.15
Nepal	5.50	4.60	5.23	4.46	5.21	4.34	4.52	3.74	4.74	4.05
Nicaragua	3.87	2.48	4.06	2.45	4.34	2.77	5.14	4.22	5.53	4.92
Niger	5.00	5.51	4.90	5.10	5.01	5.23	5.13	5.87	5.40	5.94
Nigeria	3.87	4.13	3.91	3.95	4.69	4.04	4.60	4.59	4.88	4.06
North Korea	2.04	1.14	2.04	1.22	2.11	1.37	2.16	1.30	2.14	1.22
North Macedonia	7.46	6.27	7.37	6.30	7.17	6.22	6.76	5.24	6.86	5.74
Oman	4.25	3.84	4.30	3.78	4.22	3.52	4.43	3.54	4.75	3.67
Pakistan	3.65	3.26	3.89	3.48	3.96	3.54	4.01	3.51	3.90	3.32
Panama	6.68	5.18	6.58	5.35	6.94	5.39	7.11	5.72	7.32	5.91
Papua New Guinea	4.75	4.97	5.12	4.74	5.41	5.70	5.58	4.78	5.36	4.77
Paraguay	6.24	5.71	6.29	5.77	6.32	5.85	6.24	6.04	6.38	6.14
Peru	6.39	4.61	6.56	5.77	6.83	5.79	6.85	5.81	6.86	5.40
Philippines	5.58	4.39	5.59	4.31	6.09	4.89	6.47	4.90	6.53	5.22
Poland	7.77	5.12	7.93	5.30	8.15	6.15	8.58	6.25	9.23	7.22
Qatar	5.81	6.17	5.86	6.17	5.90	5.46	5.88	5.40	6.01	5.33
Romania	7.61	5.19	7.75	5.58	4.80	5.21	4.80	5.20	4.83	5.10
Russia	4.18	2.55	5.27	3.48	7.65	4.83	8.06	5.89	8.06	5.84
Rwanda	4.55	5.29	4.65	5.25	5.30	3.47	5.31	3.52	5.06	3.17
Saudi Arabia	4.60	4.36	4.39	3.99	4.33	3.54	4.27	3.80	4.26	3.82
Senegal	5.93	6.56	5.97	6.71	6.05	6.68	6.18	6.70	6.11	6.65
Serbia	6.35	4.43	6.48	4.89	6.94	5.78	7.40	6.06	7.43	6.38
Sierra Leone	5.05	4.67	5.09	4.78	5.29	4.87	5.15	4.93	5.37	5.35
Singapore	7.22	6.99	7.05	6.96	7.07	5.95	7.15	5.95	7.17	5.96
Slovakia	8.62	6.27	8.77	6.53	8.72	6.36	8.59	6.70	8.75	6.96
Slovenia	9.08	6.41	8.90	6.20	9.27	6.72	9.18	6.78	9.01	6.47
Somalia	1.72	2.58	1.54	2.41	1.38	2.43	1.34	2.25	1.38	2.08
South Africa	6.34	5.48	6.78	6.10	6.80	6.25	6.96	5.96	7.05	6.14
South Korea	8.56	6.79	8.51	6.79	8.66	6.65	8.55	6.51	8.57	6.89
South Sudan	2.27	2.09	2.30	2.15	2.26	2.15	2.27	2.30	2.82	2.99
Sri Lanka	5.65	4.69	6.04	4.80	6.58	5.45	6.61	5.60	5.58	4.55
Sudan	1.92	1.30	2.45	3.05	2.06	1.48	2.28	1.97	2.44	2.02
Syria	1.48	1.30	1.54	1.21	1.76	1.22	1.57	1.13	1.80	1.20
Taiwan	9.51	7.70	9.48	7.64	9.49	7.37	9.42	7.33	9.53	7.48
Tajikistan	3.16	3.02	3.21	3.20	3.32	3.34	3.31	3.31	3.60	3.27
Tanzania	5.13	5.34	4.88	4.43	5.49	4.47	5.51	5.07	5.58	5.14
Thailand	4.95	3.99	4.98	4.02	4.81	4.02	4.71	3.89	4.79	3.93
Togo	4.72	5.01	4.79	4.93	4.79	4.96	4.89	5.10	4.70	4.84
Trinidad and Tobago	7.48	5.93	7.43	6.09	7.49	6.02	-	-	-	-
Tunisia	5.24	4.55	6.26	5.33	6.38	5.43	6.27	5.33	6.15	5.33
Turkey	4.96	3.75	5.45	3.98	5.51	4.05	6.17	4.72	7.30	6.06
Turkmenistan	2.67	2.18	2.67	2.19	2.71	2.32	3.14	2.51	3.39	2.41
Uganda	4.80	4.24	5.14	4.89	5.42	5.14	5.66	5.31	6.19	5.70
Ukraine	6.51	6.04	6.76	5.31	6.81	5.52	6.54	5.41	6.05	5.02
United Arab Emirates	6.05	6.55	6.01	6.38	5.95	5.35	6.07	5.55	6.05	5.36
Uruguay	9.19	7.46	9.12	7.39	9.16	7.33	9.19	7.36	9.26	7.56
Uzbekistan	4.24	3.92	4.15	3.83	4.08	3.63	3.73	2.55	3.40	1.95
Venezuela	2.74	1.63	2.65	1.44	2.77	1.29	3.47	1.86	4.04	1.87
Vietnam	4.92	5.16	4.85	5.33	4.82	4.73	4.41	4.51	4.72	4.85
Yemen	1.44	1.66	1.41	1.51	1.52	1.63	1.72	1.70	2.91	3.82
Zambia	5.37	5.16	4.34	3.91	5.16	4.77	5.45	5.06	5.70	5.19
Zimbabwe	3.24	2.86	3.39	2.72	3.68	3.19	3.33	2.37	3.83	2.71

== Method of calculation ==
The Status and Management Index is composed of a modular system of investigation dimensions (2nd level), criteria (3rd level) and indicators (4th level).

=== Country selection ===
All developing and transition countries with more than one million inhabitants are examined. Developing and transition countries are those countries that are not considered to be democratically and market-economically consolidated. In the absence of a concretely applicable definition of the consolidation limit, OECD membership prior to 1989 is used as a consolidation criterion.

In exceptional cases, countries with less than one million inhabitants (Bhutan, Djibouti and Montenegro) are also examined. From 2003 to 2022, the number of countries surveyed has increased from 116 to 137.

=== Survey procedure ===
The reports and assessments of each study, involving some 250 country experts, are based on a multi-stage survey and review process. The aim of the procedure is to arrive at results that are as objective and comparable as possible. Two experts per country - usually one international and one local expert - prepare and review qualitative country analyses on the basis of 49 standardized questions and translate the answers independently of each other into quantitative assessments. On this basis, seven regional coordinators standardise the results intra- and interregionally. A scientific advisory board of transformation experts monitors and discusses the results and adopts the final values.

The prototype of the BTI was published in 2003 and subsequently methodologically revised. Since then, no fundamental methodological changes have taken place, so that comparable time series since 2006 can be formed.

== Publications ==
The study results are published in the form of country and regional reports and a book series in English and partly in German. Initiated and financed by foreign think tanks, BTI study content has also been published in other languages: in Arabic by the Gulf Research Center in 2009, in Russian by the Moscow Center for Post-Industrial Studies in 2010 and in Spanish by the Argentinean Centro para la Apertura y el Desarrollo de América Latina in 2014. The BTI Atlas, a graphics application, offers individual visual access to the results and reports of all editions since 2006.

== Use ==
The Bertelsmann Transformation Index is used both by governments around the world to assess partner countries and by international organizations to produce their own analyses. Transparency International's Corruption Perceptions Index and the Ibrahim Index of African Governance are based in part on BTI results.

The sister project Sustainable Governance Indicators, which is methodologically modelled on the BTI, examines the reform capacity and sustainability of advanced democracies and market economies. The study covers all OECD and EU member states, including the OECD core countries not included in the BTI.
