= Democracy and National Unity Day =

15 July public holiday in Turkey

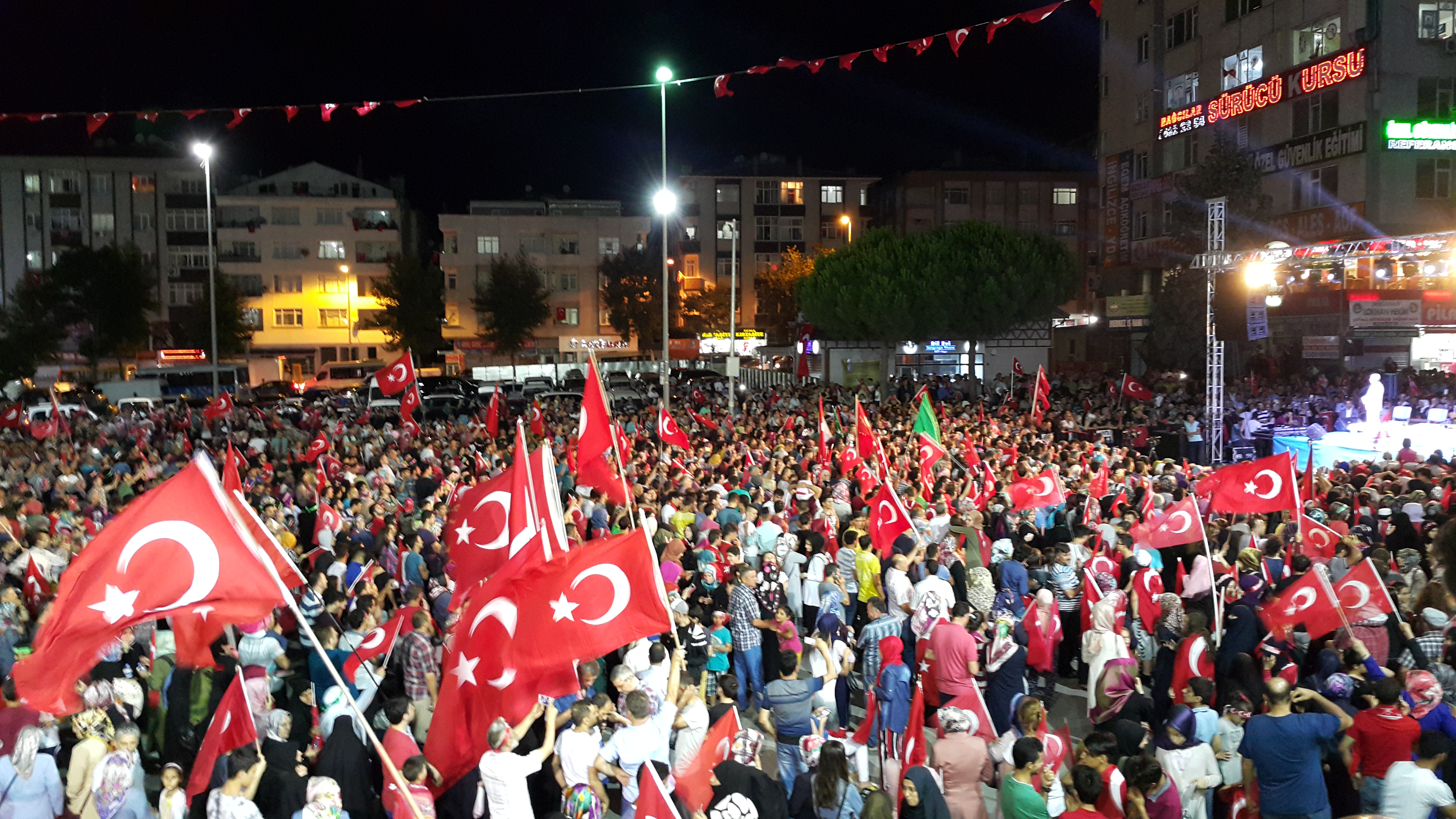
- "Democracy Watch" in İstanbul, 2016
- Observed by: Turkey
- Type: National
- Date: 15 July
- Next time: 15 July 2025
- Frequency: annual

Official logo of Democracy and National Unity Day

Democracy and National Unity Day of Türkiye (Turkish: Demokrasi ve Milli Birlik Günü) is one of the public holidays in Turkey, commemorating the national unity against the coup d'état attempt for democracy in 2016. President Recep Tayyip Erdoğan said in 27th Muhtars Meeting that, he and National Security Council recommended commemoration of veterans and martyrs of 15 July as "Democracy and Celebration of Freedom Day". Prime Minister Binali Yıldırım announced on 11 October 2016 that a new law has been prepared and opened for signatures. After formal procedures, 15 July became a national holiday as "Democracy and National Unity Day".
