= Balkan Insight =

News website

- Type: Regional news website
- Owner: Balkan Investigative Reporting Network
- Founded: 2004
- Language: Albanian; Bosnian; Croatian; English; Greek; Macedonian; Montenegrin; Romanian; Serbian
- Headquarters: Sarajevo, Bosnia and Herzegovina
- Website: balkaninsight.com

Balkan Insight is a website of the Balkan Investigative Reporting Network (BIRN) that focuses on news, socio-political analysis, commentary, and investigative reporting from Southeastern Europe. It is run by journalists in southeast Europe. BIRN was founded in 2004 as a network of non-governmental organizations to promote a strong, independent, and free media in the Balkans and Eastern Europe.

Balkan Insight is the successor of BIRN's "Balkan Crisis Report" newsletter. It reports from "Albania, Bosnia and Herzegovina, Bulgaria, Croatia, Kosovo, North Macedonia, Montenegro, Moldova, Romania and Serbia, with occasional coverage of Turkey and Greece. BIRN also operates country and language specific investigative platforms, such as Reporter.al, which focuses on Albanian affairs. From 2019, Balkan Insight is extending its coverage on Ukraine, the Czech Republic, Slovakia, Hungary and Poland."

== Reception ==
Neue Zürcher Zeitung reported that Balkan Insight is a "highly regarded Internet portal" and BIRN is "valued for its independence and seriousness". In 2015, the journal Academicus International Scientific Journal reported that Balkan Insight was "the leading news site covering the Western Balkans Region", and often published opinions from international leaders. According to Robin Wilson, Balkan Insight is a valuable source of objective analysis of ex-Yugoslav countries, in contrast to Yugoslav media that split up along nationalist lines. Wilson stated that BI attracts quality contributors and maintains separation between reporting and opinion.

BIRN journalists and reports that have received awards include Krenar Gashi and the BIRN investigative team, who won the Best Print/Online Story of 2006 for "Ex-Policemen Run Kosovo Passport Scam" handed out by the Association of Professional Journalists of Kosovo. Arbana Xharra was the winner of the 2006 journalism competition organized by the United Nations Development Program (UNDP), Organization for Security and Cooperation in Europe (OSCE) and Kosovo Anti-Corruption Agency; for her reporting on corruption in both Balkan Insight and the Kosovo daily newspaper Koha Ditore. In 2020, BIRN received the Press Freedom Award from the Austrian chapter of Reporters Without Borders.

== Financing ==
Donors to the Balkan Investigative Reporting Network include the Austrian Development Agency, Balkan Trust for Democracy, the philanthropic initiative Civitates, Delegation of the European Union to Montenegro, ERSTE Foundation, European Commission, Konrad-Adenauer-Stiftung, Rockefeller Brothers Fund, The Dutch Fund for Regional Partnerships/Matra and the Swedish International Development Cooperation Agency.
