= List of school attacks in Turkey =

This chronological list of school attacks in Turkey that occurred at K–12 public and private schools, as well as at colleges and universities, and on school buses. Excluded from this list are the following:

1. Incidents that occurred as a result of police actions.
2. Suicides or suicide attempts involving only one person.

In 69 attacks on schools, 63 people have been killed and 165 others injured for a total of 226 casualties (including perpetrator/s).

== List ==
| Date | Location | Perpetrator(s) | Dead | Injured | Total | Description |
|---|---|---|---|---|---|---|
| 16 March 1978 | Istanbul | Unnamed | 7 | 41 | 48 | Beyazıt massacre: Seven students were killed and 41 injured in a gun and bomb attack at Istanbul University. |
| 13 May 1999 | Istanbul | Murat Kurt | 2 | 0 | 2 | An 18-year-old former student shot and killed his 17-year-old ex-girlfriend and an intervening teacher. |
| 30 May 2000 | Denizli, Denizli Province | Imdat Niyaz | 1 | 0 | 1 | A 19-year-old student returned to school with a gun after being denied entry and shot and killed a teacher. |
| 3 November 2000 | Istanbul | Metin Alkan | 5 (Note: Including the perpetrator or suspect) | 3 | 8 | A bus driver at a primary school opened fire in a room at the school used by other drivers, killing four and wounding three. The shooter fatally shot himself in the schoolyard. |
| 22 November 2005 | Nusaybin, Mardin Province | Unnamed | 1 | 4 | 5 | Nusaybin school shooting: A student shot and killed a teacher and wounded four others with a rifle before being arrested. |
| 20 February 2006 | Istanbul | Unnamed | 0 | 1 | 1 | An 11-year-old student bystander was stabbed in a schoolyard in Üsküdar. |
| 22 February 2006 | Manisa, Manisa Province | Unnamed | 0 | 1 | 1 | A student was stabbed during an argument. |
| 24 March 2006 | İzmit, Kocaeli Province | Unnamed | 0 | 1 | 1 | A student was stabbed in a classroom. |
| 24 March 2006 | Istanbul | Unnamed | 1 | 0 | 1 | A 14-year-old fatally stabbed another student at a school in Beşiktaş. |
| 30 March 2006 | Konya, Konya Province | Unnamed; Unnamed; Unnamed | 0 | 1 | 1 | Three attackers entered a schoolyard and stabbed a student before leaving. |
| 30 March 2006 | Erzurum, Erzurum Province | Unnamed | 0 | 1 | 1 | A student was stabbed outside a high school after coming to the aid of female students. |
| 30 March 2006 | Iskenderun, Hatay Province | Unnamed | 0 | 1 | 1 | A student stabbed a schoolmate in the schoolyard. |
| 31 March 2006 | Balıkesir, Balıkesir Province | M.G. | 0 | 2 | 2 | A 19-year-old due to be expelled attacked two faculty members with a knife. |
| 3 April 2006 | Ankara, Ankara Province | Unnamed | 0 | 2 | 2 | Two students were stabbed during a fight. |
| 27 April 2006 | Adana, Adana Province | Serap M. | 1 | 0 | 1 | 17-year-old Tuğral Ülger was shot dead in a classroom by his ex-girlfriend. |
| 1 October 2009 | Adana, Adana Province | Unnamed | 0 | 0 | 0 | An 11-year-old student with mental disorders attacked other students and teachers with a knife, but was subdued and arrested before he could cause any injuries. He was freed due to his young age. |
| 5 October 2009 | Adana, Adana Province | Unnamed | 0 | 0 | 0 | The student who had attacked others with a knife four days earlier shouted at classmates and threatened to shoot them, then left school and returned with a shotgun. He fired multiple shots at the school office, causing damage to it. After shooting at agricultural workers as he fled, he was apprehended. |
| 4 May 2010 | Diyarbakır, Diyarbakır Province | Mahir Zeybek | 0 | 1 | 1 | A Dicle University student shot and wounded a lecturer he had previously disputed with. |
| 14 November 2011 | Eskişehir, Eskişehir Province | S.D. | 0 | 2 | 2 | A 13-year-old student armed with his father's shotgun fired at and wounded a teacher. Another student was grazed. |
| 25 September 2012 | İzmir, İzmir Province | H.K. | 1 | 0 | 1 | A student fatally stabbed 40-year-old teacher Sevilay Durukan at a school. |
| 2 August 2013 | Erzincan, Erzincan Province | Ahmet Ateş | 2 | 0 | 2 | A school employee killed a co-worker with a shotgun before killing himself. |
| 20 February 2015 | İzmir, İzmir Province | Nurullah Semo | 1 | 7 | 8 | Murder of Fırat Çakıroğlu: 24-year-old political activist and Ege University student Fırat Çakıroğlu was stabbed to death and seven others wounded during a fight on campus. |
| 23 April 2015 | Istanbul | Hediyetullah Y. | 0 | 2 | 2 | A 19-year-old man fired at two students in a schoolyard, wounding them. |
| 15 December 2015 | Adana, Adana Province | Hamit K. | 0 | 4 | 4 | During a fight involving knives and a gun at a high school, four students were stabbed. |
| 17 December 2015 | Istanbul | Unnamed | 0 | 1 | 1 | A teacher was shot in the leg during an argument. |
| 22 September 2016 | Istanbul | Unnamed | 0 | 1 | 1 | A driver was wounded by a gunman in front of a school in Ümraniye. |
| 20 March 2017 | Rize, Rize Province | B.K. | 1 | 1 | 2 | A student fatally stabbed 16-year-old Emir Taş before attempting suicide. |
| 5 May 2017 | Bursa, Bursa Province | Hasan Can | 2 | 0 | 2 | A 16-year-old shot and killed 16-year-old Nilüfer Acar inside a classroom before fatally wounding himself. |
| 24 November 2017 | Tekirdağ, Tekirdağ Province | Unnamed | 0 | 2 | 2 | A male stabbed two students who he had previously fought with outside their school. |
| 15 December 2017 | İzmir, İzmir Province | U.Y. İ.P. | 1 | 0 | 1 | Two students, aged 16, fatally shot principal Ayhan Kökmen at a high school. |
| 5 March 2018 | Iskenderun,Hatay Province | Umut C. | 0 | 2 | 2 | At,Iskenderun Vocational and Technical Anatolian High School, an argument broke out between students right inside the school building, which later involved parents and relatives from outside. During the massive brawl, a suspect armed with a knife stabbed a student named Mazlum D. in the leg and repeatedly stabbed another individual, Bulent A., who was trying to intervene, 9 times, leaving him severely injured. Following the incident, the attacker was apprehended and arrested. |
| 5 April 2018 | Eskişehir, Eskişehir Province | Volkan Bayar | 4 | 3 | 7 | Eskişehir University shooting: A research assistant opened fire at Eskişehir Osmangazi University, killing four people and wounding three others. |
| 11 April 2018 | Bursa, Bursa Province | B.C. | 0 | 2 | 2 | A on-duty police officer whose child studied at a primary school in Nilüfer opened fire during a meeting, wounding the principal and assistant principal. |
| 19 October 2018 | Maltepe, Istanbul | Unnamed | 0 | 2 | 2 | Two groups of students fought each other with knives in a school canteen, leaving two students injured. |
| 2 January 2019 | Ankara, Ankara Province | Hasan İsmail Hikmet | 1 | 0 | 1 | A student shot and stabbed research assistant Ceren Damar Şenel to death at Çankaya University. |
| 4 January 2019 | Istanbul | Mujahid I. | 0 | 1 | 1 | A 14-year-old student was stabbed during an argument at a secondary school. |
| 19 February 2019 | Iğdır, Iğdır Province | Abdullah D. | 0 | 1 | 1 | A local man shot and grazed a school principal in his office, then surrendered to the local gendarmerie. |
| 17 February 2020 | Ankara, Ankara Province | Murat Ekinci | 1 | 1 | 2 | A school security guard shot and wounded the principal before committing suicide. |
| 12 March 2021 | Çorum, Çorum Province | Selfet Başkuş | 2 | 0 | 2 | A man shot and killed two students on a school bus for allegedly fighting with his son. |
| 22 November 2022 | Kastamonu, Kastamonu Province | B.K. | 0 | 1 | 1 | A 17-year-old suspended student stabbed a deputy principal at a high school. |
| 30 November 2022 | Mersin, Mersin Province | E.D. | 1 | 0 | 1 | 12-year-old Fatma Nisa Yürekli was murdered at school by a classmate, who beat her with a hose before stabbing her. |
| 27 April 2023 | Urfa, Şanlıurfa Province | I.D. | 0 | 3 | 3 | A student who was reprimanded for smoking a cigarette began firing a shotgun outside the school at people inside, wounding two faculty members and a student. |
| 5 May 2023 | Bursa, Bursa Province | Ferdi Y. | 0 | 1 | 1 | A man who claimed his daughter had been abused by school staff opened fire and wounded the assistant principal. |
| 5 February 2024 | Kayseri | Şehriban A. | 0 | 1 | 1 | A teacher was shot and wounded by his romantic partner in a classroom. |
| 29 April 2024 | Ankara, Ankara Province | R.U. | 0 | 1 | 1 | A 17-year-old student stabbed an assistant principal in the leg after being caught with an electronic cigarette. |
| 6 May 2024 | Mardin, Mardin Province | Unnamed | 0 | 0 | 0 | An expelled student returned to school and fired a gun several times in the air as she tried to get inside. |
| 7 May 2024 | Istanbul | Yousif K. | 1 | 0 | 1 | Murder of Ibrahim Oktugan: Principal Ibrahim Oktugan was shot and killed by a 17-year-old expelled student. |
| 16 October 2024 | Istanbul | Serdar Alagöz | 0 | 0 | 0 | A 34-year-old teacher, armed with a gun and three knives, attempted to shoot the assistant principal, but his gun jammed. He fired his gun as he fled, but no one was injured. He was arrested by responding police. |
| 25 October 2024 | Karaman, Karaman Province | A.G. | 1 | 0 | 1 | 16-year-old Mehmet Eren Parlak was shot dead by another student in a school gym. |
| 5 November 2024 | Bolu, Bolu Province | Unnamed | 0 | 1 | 1 | A 12-year-old was stabbed during a fight at a secondary school. |
| 25 November 2024 | İzmir, İzmir Province | Unnamed | 0 | 5 | 5 | Five people, including two non-students, were wounded in a knife fight in a schoolyard that started after a dispute between students. |
| 17 February 2025 | Konya, Konya Province | Bestami Serdar Ergüder | 1 | 1 | 2 | A student shot and wounded an assistant dean at Selçuk University before fatally shooting himself. |
| 21 February 2025 | Konya, Konya Province | Kerem K. | 0 | 1 | 1 | A student's brother opened fire at a primary school, wounding a teacher. |
| 9 May 2025 | Giresun, Giresun Province | Abdullah Turan | 2 | 0 | 2 | A school security guard fatally shot two other employees. |
| 12 May 2025 | Gölcük, Kocaeli Province | Unnamed | 0 | 0 | 0 | During a fight outside Şehit Volkan Tantürk Vocational and Technical Anatolian High School, a man shot at the school, causing no injuries. |
| 12 June 2025 | Konya, Konya Province | Berkehan Oluk | 1 | 0 | 1 | A 27-year-old man armed with a rifle killed a guidance counselor at a secondary school. |
| 30 August 2025 | Istanbul | Ayberk Kurtuluş | 2 | 0 | 2 | A 20-year-old man shot and killed a 15-year-old girl in a café on the campus of Boğaziçi University before committing suicide. |
| 23 October 2025 | Kayseri | Ferhat Karakaya | 1 | 0 | 1 | A woman was shot to death on the campus of Erciyes University by her ex-husband. |
| 22 December 2025 | Mersin, Mersin Province | M.K. | 0 | 1 | 1 | After being reprimanded by principal Ender Kara, a 12-year-old student returned to school with a rifle and wounded him. |
| 2 March 2026 | Istanbul, Çekmeköy | F.S.B. | 1 | 2 | 3 | Çekmeköy school stabbing: A 17-year-old student stabbed his teacher to death and then injured another teacher and a student by stabbing them. |
| 14 April 2026 | Siverek, Şanlıurfa Province | Ömer Ket | 1 | 16 | 17 | 2026 Siverek school shooting: A 19-year-old former student armed with a pump-action shotgun opened fire at a vocational high school. |
| 15 April 2026 | Onikişubat, Kahramanmaraş Province | İsa Aras Mersinli | 13 | 20 | 33 | 2026 Onikişubat school shooting: A 13-year-old student armed with their father's weapons opened fire in two classrooms at a secondary school, killing eleven students and a teacher. The attacker was later injured after being stabbed in the leg and subsequently died from blood loss. |
| 17 September 2026 | Ankara, Ankara Province | Bayram Gök | 1 | 0 | 1 | A man fatally stabbed his ex-wife in a schoolyard as she waited to pick up their child. |
| 22 September 2026 | Turgutlu, Manisa Province | Halil Orhan | 0 | 11 | 11 | 2026 Turgutlu school shooting: A 15-year-old student armed with their grandparents pump-action shotgun opened fire at a vocational high school, injuring at least 11 students, with 2 being in critical condition. The assailant has reportedly been detained. |
| 28 September 2026 | Osmaniye | Nephew of Mehmet Bilgili | 1 | 0 | 1 | A man fatally shot a teacher Mehmet Bilgili in the courtyard of Farabi Anadolu Lisesi in Çardak, Osmaniye. The attack occurred in an area with gazebos while students were in class. |
| 6 October 2026 | Istanbul | F.M. | 1 | 7 | 8 | 2026 Basaksehir school stabbing: A 15-year-old girl went inside her former middle school with a knife and began attacking pupils. Eight people were stabbed, one fatally. |
| 7 October 2026 | Istanbul | A.Ç. | 0 | 3 | 3 | 2026 Esenyurt school stabbing:A 16-year-old student wounded two classmates with a knife. |
| 14 October 2026 | Seyhan | Unnamed | 0 | 1 | 1 | A female sixth-grade student stabbed and injured a female classmate in the arm with a bread knife as retaliation for alleged gossiping. |
| 14 October 2026 | Bitlis | B.T. | 0 | 0 | 0 | A 14-year-old girl opened fire on the middle school she had graduated from. The principal prevented potential harm by locking the doors, and the attacker was subsequently subdued. Her older sister said, "She had been saying for a year that she was going to attack the school." |
| 12 November 2026 | Malatya | Unknown | 0 | 0 | 0 | After being denied entry to a school in Malatya, a non-student girl returned with a knife and attempted to attack the female police officer stationed at the entrance. The officer fired warning shots into the air and subdued the girl with the help of a school staff member and a bystander before anyone was harmed. The girl was taken into custody, and no students, teachers, staff, or police officers were injured in the incident. |

== See also ==
- List of massacres in Turkey
- List of school shootings in Europe
