= 2026 Afyonkarahisar shootings =

2026 spree shooting in Turkey

- The perpetrator's car approaching an incoming car
- Location: Afyonkarahisar and İhsaniye districts, Afyonkarahisar Province, Turkey
- Date: 5 November 2026 c. 15:00 – 20:57 (TRT; UTC+03:00)
- Attack type: Spree killing; mass shooting; mass murder; carjacking; shootout
- Weapon: Pump-action shotgun
- Deaths: 8
- Injuries: 3
- Motive: Revenge for financial dispute; crime scene getaway
- Accused: Arif Sefa Özdemir

On 5 November 2026, a spree shooting and carjacking occurred across multiple locations in the Afyonkarahisar and İhsaniye districts of Afyonkarahisar Province, Turkey. Eight people were killed and three others were injured. The gunman, who was identified as 30-year-old Arif Sefa Özdemir, was captured following a shootout with the authorities.

== Background ==
In Turkey, ownership of a gun is a state-regulated privilege rather than a constitutional right. The laws regarding licensing, registration, criminal and background checks are strict, with severe penalties for illegal possession. Despite this, there are concerns that gun ownership has increased significantly due to guns being obtained illegally.

Mass shootings are rare in Turkey, though several incidents have taken place in 2026 alone. In April 2026, shootings occurred at a school in Siverek in which 16 were injured and the shooter committed suicide and at a school in Kahramanmaraş in which 12 were killed, making it Turkey's deadliest school shooting. In May 2026, 6 people were killed in a series of shootings across multiple neighborhoods in Mersin, before the perpetrator killed himself after getting cornered by authorities.

== Shootings ==
=== First attack ===
In Ayazini, the gunman shot three occupants of a car, killing them. He invited one of the victims to meet up, ostensibly to repay a previous debt. The victim brought the two other victims with him and the two parties met up in Ayazini. Around 15:00 TRT, the gunman shot the three men dead in an ambush.

=== Second attack ===
After fleeing Ayazini, the gunman arrived in Kıyır, where he killed a total of three people, two occupants of a car and a third person whose body was discovered 1 kilometer away from the first two victims. He shot the two occupants of the car after they refused to give their car to him. The third victim was shot dead after he witnessed the gunman holding a shotgun and threatened to call the police. Shortly after this attack, he shot at a truck near Selimiye, İscehisar whom he claimed forced his car into a tight spot.

=== Third attack ===
The third attack occurred around 15:30 TRT on the Osman Gazi quarter, near the Uydukent neighborhood of Afyonkarahisar District, Afyonkarahisar Province. The gunman, exiting a vehicle, shot the driver of another vehicle with a shotgun, critically wounding her. The victim was rushed to Afyonkarahisar State Hospital, where she was intubated in an intensive care unit following surgery and remains in critical condition. The gunman later admitted to targeting the victim for not giving her car to him. The villages of Anıtkaya, Afyonkarahisar and Belce, Gazlıgöl were also reported to have been affected by the shootings.

=== Fourth attack ===
Fleeing towards Yukarıtandır, the gunman shot and killed two teachers, occupants of a car. One of the teachers died on scene and the other succumbed to her injuries in a hospital. Initially, a third person, who was an occupant of the car targeted by the gunman, was also reported as killed. However, it was later revealed that she survived unharmed. The gunman later recounted that when he intercepted the car, one of the occupants got out of the car, the two others did not. He said that after counting back from 10 to 0 and again from 5 to 0, he shot the two remaining occupants.

=== Shootout with authorities ===
Exiting Yukarıtandır, the gunman fled towards Seyitgazi after hijacking another car in Kırka, near Çatören Dam. He drove until he arrived in Taşlıkköy, Seyitgazi, when he abandoned the car he drove in after it got stuck in mud. The gunman first fled on foot and later hijacked the car of a milkman in Taşlıkköy. He fled towards a mine near Kuyucak, Odunpazarı. (Note: Erroneously reported as part of Seyitgazi.) The area the gunman fled towards was blockaded by authorities. The gunman was intercepted near a checkpoint created in a joint operation by the gendarmerie and police. They shot at the tires of the car used by the gunman, forcing it to a halt. The gunman engaged the authorities in a brief gunfight in which he wounded a gendarmerie sergeant before getting subdued and arrested.

== Victims ==
A total of 8 people were killed by the gunman in the shootings.

Killed in Ayazini:

- Ahmet Uzel, 57
- Bekir Toprak, 50
- Noman Toprak, 56

Killed in Kıyır:

- Seydi Ahmet Aydoğmuş, 73
- Satı Aydoğmuş, 68
- İsmail Şen, 61

Killed in Yukarıtandır:

- Ayşe Sena Demir, 46
- Hilal Mete, 31

Realtor Sevgi Postalcı, the victim targeted by the gunman in the third attack, remains hospitalized in critical condition. It was later revealed that the driver of the truck targeted by the gunman near Selimiye sustained injuries. A gendarmerie sergeant sustained minor injuries to his ear during the shootout with the gunman.

== Suspect ==
Özdemir during one of his attacks

The suspect was identified as 30 year old Arif Sefa Özdemir (born 1996). He lived in Bozhüyük, İhsaniye, where he worked as a farmer. He occasionally worked as a combine harvester operator with stints in Manisa and İzmir. Özdemir was married to Kevser Solmaz, with whom he had multiple children, until May 2025 when he divorced her after alleging that she had been negligent towards their children. They continued to live together until February 2026 when Solmaz moved back to her hometown. They retained frequent communication. According to childhood friend Mehmet Özdemir of Bozhüyük, Arif Sefa went through a period of financial hardship following the divorce and later worked as a crane operator in the nearby town of Sandıklı afterwards. The media highlighted an interview where Özdemir talked in an Anadolu Agency profile into the performance of the office of the mukhtar of Bozhüyük in 2024, in which he claimed that the office was "working like a municipality" and proceeded to describe said performance.

=== The suspect's actions on the previous day and on the day of the attacks ===
On 4 November 2026, one day before the attacks, Özdemir called the mukhtar of Tekeli Atatürk, Menderes, İzmir around 18:42 TRT. They talked for 9 minutes. Tekeli Atatürk is the village where the combine harvester at the center of the dispute between Özdemir and Uzel burnt down.

Around 22:30 TRT, Özdemir called Noman Toprak, who would go on to become one of his victims. He muted his phone during the first call. Toprak assumed otherwise, swore at him and detailed the legal action he would take against Özdemir. He called Toprak again 15 minutes later and this time, he made meal arrangements and invited his future victims to Gazlıgöl in a trap.

One day later on the day of the attacks, Özdemir called his ex-wife, who was in Manisa at the time, around 12:00 TRT. He said: "Come to Afyon and take charge of the children; I’m going to end up in trouble." She said she would think about it and let him know. He said "You know best" and hung up.

In his statement to the Afyonkarahisar prosecutor's office, Özdemir said that he bought cigarettes, alcohol and an energy drink from a convenience store near a gas station and consumed alcohol while on his way to meet up with Uzel and the Topraks.

Immediately after the first shooting, Özdemir called his father around 15:00 TRT and confessed to the killing. "Dad, I couldn’t take it anymore; they kept swearing, so I killed all three of them" he said. His father urged him to surrender. He said he would flee. Shortly after the call with his father, Özdemir called an acquaintance, an industrial tradesperson, and confessed to him about the killing too.

After his attack in Kıyır, Özdemir discarded his phone to avoid being followed by the police.

After his attack in Yukarıtandır, he visited the homes of two mukthars of adjacent villages in order to find a pistol. He introduced himself as an auditor and MİT employee coming from Ankara and demanded their service pistols. He was unsuccessful.

During the carjacking in Taşlıkköy, Özdemir threatened the occupants of the first car by claiming to be doing a drug inspection. He took their phones as well. After said car got stuck in mud, he fled on foot until he arrived in a nearby village. He broke a home camera in the area in an attempt to hide there. He stole a car parked in front of a house by slowly pushing it forward so as not to make much noise. After getting intercepted by authorities near a checkpoint, Özdemir got out of the car he was using and tried to flee on foot again until he fell and was caught by authorities.

=== Weapons and ammo ===
Özdemir used a pump action shotgun during the shootings. A large number of shotgun shells were discovered on him and the car he abandoned in Taşlıkköy (dubbed "an arsenal" by a news outlet).

Gendarmerie forces investigating the origin of the shotgun used by Özdemir determined that it is an unlicensed firearm. He bought it from a man named M.A. for ₺12,000 around one month before the attacks. This man would later go on to be incarcerated following a conviction for an unrelated crime.

=== Cars ===
Özdemir used at least 4 cars at different times during the attacks. The first car he used is a red Fiat Doblò. He was captured in CCTV footage with this car. He later used a gray SUV which he hijacked following his attack in Kıyır. The penultimate car he used is a blue SUV. He hijacked this car after introducing himself as a MİT employee and threatening the occupants of the car at gunpoint. This is the car that got stuck in mud. The last car he used is that of the milkman. This is the car the tires of which were shot at during the authorities' operation to catch Özdemir.

=== Motive ===
The primary motive considered by the authorities is revenge. In his statement to the police, Özdemir recounted that he bought a combine harvester from Uzel for €40,000. This combine harvester later burnt down. After the incident with the combine harvester, a dispute regarding the remainder of the money Özdemir owed to Uzel was triggered. One week before the attacks, Uzel demanded €11,000, while Özdemir insisted that the money he owed was €4,000. The dispute quickly evolved into back and forth swearing and threats. According to Ali İhsan Adatepe, who is from the same village as the perpetrator, Özdemir was once assaulted by the people he owed money to. It is alleged that on the day of the attacks, Özdemir called Uzel and invited him to Afyonkarahisar under the guise of repayment. Uzel brought Bekir and Noman Toprak with him. They met up in Ayazini. Following an argument, Özdemir shot the three men dead.

The secondary motive is carjacking and getaway. He seemingly targeted the rest of his victims in order to hijack their cars. In an interview he gave to NTV, Adatepe is quoted as follows:

After shooting them [Uzel and the Topraks], he heads back toward the Kıyı[r] area. On the way, he encounters two people. He wants to take their car, and when they refuse to hand it over, he shoots them as well. From there, he circles around the Bayat and Çıkrık direction, and on the road from Fethibey toward Gazlıgöl, he comes across some female teachers. He tells them, "Get out; I’m taking your car." It seems one of them gets out, while the other does not. He then moves to take the vehicle and shoots them too.

In the initial account of the attack in Afyonkarahisar District, it was said that Özdemir targeted Postalcı in order to hijack her car and shot her after she resisted. However, in his statement to the Afyonkarahisar prosecutor's office, Özdemir said that he noticed her honking at him and trying to record him on her phone. Wanting to prevent his likeness and his car from being reported to the police, he shot her and fled without hijacking her car.

Özdemir's car was attacked in the Hasan Karaağaç neighborhood of Afyonkarahisar District on 17 March 2026. The car was wrecked, and he requested help from the police, filing a complaint against the perpetrators. The authorities are investigating whether this incident has any connection to the murders.

=== Mental health ===
In an interview he gave to Hürriyet, Mehmet Özdemir of Bozhüyük, a childhood friend of the perpetrator, while noting that he had known the perpetrator "ever since he was little", suggested that he "might have psychological problem[s]".

According to the mukhtar of Tekeli Atatürk, Özdemir would regularly drink alcohol.

In a Milliyet interview, journalist and serial murder researcher Sevinç Yavuz suggested that Özdemir's rampage might have been an episode of amok syndrome:

This resembles an "amok" run—a sudden, frenzied outburst of violence—more than it does a series of murders. (...) Substance use could also be a factor; while it is not a universal trait among such individuals, it is certainly a possibility. (...) [S]erial killers are often not particularly brave, nor are they inherently aggressive. The incident in Afyon, however, involves a much more aggressive use of weaponry. Even the distance from which the victims were shot is a significant detail here.

== Aftermath ==
After his appraisal, Özdemir was taken to Eskişehir Yunus Emre State Hospital for a health check, along with an alcohol and drug test. After the checks at the hospital, he was taken to Odunpazarı District Gendarmerie Command under heavy police protection. After procedures in Odunpazarı, he was transferred to Afyonkarahisar Provincial Gendarmerie Command.

Afyonkarahisar Office of the Chief Public Prosecutor appointed three chief public prosecutors to carry out a multifaceted investigation regarding the case. The Afyonkarahisar 1st Criminal Judgeship of Peace issued a publication ban on the case for "the integrity of the investigation, to prevent the spread of fake information and to prevent outrage", which was sent to media outlets via RTÜK.

Hasan Özdemir, the father of the perpetrator, was detained at Afyonkarahisar Provincial Gendarmerie Command in connection with the case. He was later released following interrogation. On 6 November 2026, the perpetrator was convicted by the criminal judgeship of peace at the Afyonkarahisar Courthouse on the charge of "intentional homicide of more than one person."

== See also ==
- 2026 Mersin shootings
- 2026 Onikişubat school shooting
