= 2026 Turkey shooting =

2026 Turkey shooting or 2026 Turkey school shooting may refer to the following events:

- 2026 Siverek school shooting, which occurred on 14 April
- 2026 Onikişubat school shooting, which occurred on 15 April
- 2026 Mersin shootings, which occurred on 18 May
- 2026 Turgutlu school shooting, which occurred on 22 September
- 2026 Afyonkarahisar shootings, which occurred on 5 November

== See also ==
- 2026 Istanbul school stabbing, school stabbing in Turkey
- 2026 Bahçeşehir school attack, school stabbing in Turkey
