= 2026 Turgutlu school shooting =

School shooting in Turkey

- CCTV still of the gunman
- İnci Üzmez Vocational and Technical Anatolian High School
- Location: 38.5072229°N 27.7124045°E; Turgutlu, Manisa Province, Turkey
- Date: 22 September 2026 c. 8:00 a.m. (TRT; UTC+03:00)
- Target: Students near the school
- Attack type: Mass shooting, school shooting
- Weapon: Pump-action shotgun
- Deaths: 0
- Injuries: 11
- Motive: Under investigation
- Accused: Halil Orhan

On 22 September 2026, a school shooting occurred near the İnci Üzmez Vocational and Technical Anatolian High School (Turkish: İnci Üzmez Mesleki ve Teknik Anadolu Lisesi) in Turgutlu, Manisa Province, Turkey. Eleven students were injured, three of them critically.

This is the third school shooting in Turkey in 2026, after the Siverek and Onikişubat shootings.

== Shooting ==
Minutes prior to the attack the perpetrator, later identified as a 15-year-old ninth-grade student from the school, Halil Orhan, was spotted on security cameras carrying a shotgun on the street outside the school. The attack happened around 8:00 a.m. local time, when withnesses reported gunshots coming from school direction. Minister Mustafa Çiftçi stated that a security guard and a gardener were on duty at the school during the attack. Orhan shot multiple shots from a shotgun that was later identified as his grandfather's. The gardener said that the gunman opened fire on the students from a distance of '80-100 meters' from the school. Following the attack, Orhan fled the street with the weapon and was again captured on surveillance footage. As news spread, worried parents rushed to the school and clashed with law enforcement trying to get inside.

=== Victims ===
A total of 11 people were wounded; three of them were in critical condition and receiving intensive care. One person was discharged from the hospital the same day.

== Suspect ==
The suspect was identified as Halil Orhan (born 2011), a 15-year-old ninth-grade student from the aforementioned school, and was detained by law enforcement along with his mother, father and grandfather who owned the shotgun that was used in the attack.

== Reactions ==
President Recep Tayyip Erdoğan and Minister of Justice Akın Gürlek released statements on their social media accounts condemning the attack.

Minister of Interior Mustafa Çiftçi and education minister Yusuf Tekin visited students who were injured in the attack.

== See also ==
- List of school attacks in Turkey
- List of filmed mass shootings
