= Ablak =

Ablak may refer to:

- Ablak (saint), a saint of the Ethiopian Orthodox Tewahedo Church
- Ablak, Emirdağ, a village in the district of Emirdağ, Afyonkarahisar Province, Turkey
- Ablak, İhsaniye, a village in the district of İhsaniye, Afyonkarahisar Province, Turkey
