= 2026 Mersin shootings =

Spree shooting and vehicle ramming in Turkey

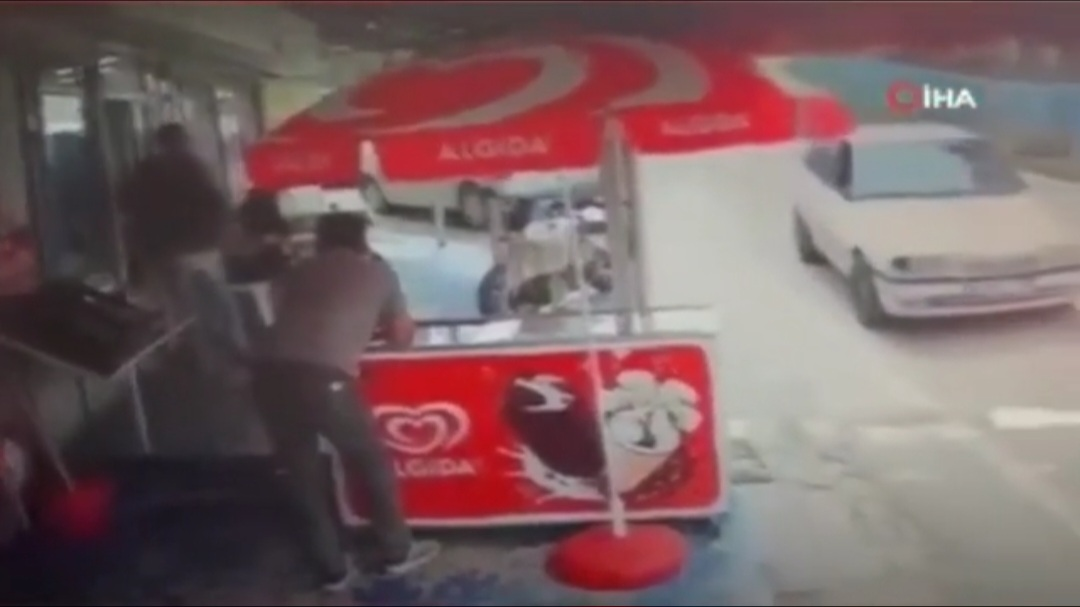
- The perpetrator's car approaching a store.
- Location: Tarsus and Çamlıyayla, Mersin Province, Turkey
- Date: 18 May 2026
- Attack type: Spree killing, vehicle-ramming attack, mass murder,Suicide Attack, mass shooting
- Weapons: Semi-automatic pistol; Pump-action shotgun; Opel Astra F Hatchback (3-door variant)
- Deaths: 7 (including the perpetrator)
- Injuries: 8
- Perpetrator: Metin Öztürk

On 18 May 2026, a spree shooting and a ramming occurred across multiple neighborhoods in the Tarsus and Çamlıyayla districts of Mersin Province, Turkey. Six people were killed and eight others were injured. The gunman, who was identified as 37-year-old Metin Öztürk, suicided after getting cornered by authorities.

== Shootings ==
The attacks began in the Kadelli neighborhood of the Tarsus district at approximately 13:52, where Öztürk targeted a restaurant where he had previously been employed. According to a surviving employee, Öztürk entered the establishment, ignored a greeting made by a worker, and immediately opened fire with a pump-action shotgun. He wounded an employee in the hip, fatally shot the 30-year-old shop owner, Sabri Pan, and killed an 18-year-old employee, Ahmet Ercan Can, outside the establishment before fleeing in his car.

Öztürk drove from the restaurant into the Yeniköy neighborhood, pulling into a local gas station. There, he shot and killed 50-year-old truck driver Gökay Selfioğlu before driving off immediately after. Continuing his drive toward the Çamlıyayla district, Öztürk spotted his ex-wife, 32-year-old Arzu Özden, walking along a street in the Darıpınarı neighborhood. He shot and killed her on the roadside.

From there, Öztürk headed back down the main highway, firing randomly at bystanders along the way. He shot and injured two people in Çamalan Village and critically wounded a market worker in the Kaburgediği neighborhood. While moving back through the Yeniköy area, Öztürk used his vehicle to ram a motorcycle driven by 50-year-old Abdullah Koca, forcing him into a ditch where Koca was then shot and killed. His final victim was 16-year-old Yusuf Oktay; Öztürk shot and killed the teenager who was grazing animals in the Karakütük neighborhood.

== Aftermath ==
Following the attacks, Turkish security forces launched a wide-scale search operation for the perpetrator in the region. According to statements made from the officials, police units tracked down the perpetrator as he moved between rural locations after his spree shootings. The perpetrator was then cornered by security forces during the search operation, and committed suicide with the firearm that he had with him before being apprehended by them.

An investigation was later opened by the authorities/prosecutors into the attacks to determine how the incident occurred.

The Radio and Television Supreme Council (RTÜK) announced a broadcasting ban in accordance with the decision of the Tarsus 2nd Magistrates' Court dated May 18, 2026, and numbered 2026/2362.

== Victims ==
Six people were killed in the attacks across several locations in the Tarsus and Çamlıyayla districts, including Darıpınarı, Kadelli, Kaburgediği and Yeniköy. Those killed were:

- Arzu Özden, 32, the perpetrator's ex-wife, she was shot and killed while walking on a street during the initial attack
- Sabri Pan, 32, the owner of the restaurant that was targeted in the Kadelli neighborhood
- Ahmet Ercan Can, 18, an employee that was working at Sabri Pan's restaurant
- Gökay Selfioğlu, 50, the truck driver who was shot at a gas station during the escape of the perpetrator
- Abdullah Koca, 50, the motorcyclist who was rammed off the road by the perpetrator
- Yusuf Oktay, 16, the teen who was shot and killed while grazing animals

Eight other individuals sustained gunshot injuries during the attack, they were transported to hospitals across the district.

== Suspect ==
The perpetrator was identified as Metin Öztürk (born 1989), who fled the scene and was at large before killing himself after being cornered by authorities. According to an official press statement released by the Mersin Governor's Office, he was determined to have numerous hospital visits and various psychiatric diagnoses due to substance abuse. It was also determined that a year before the incident occurred, he was working in the same Kadelli neighborhood that he had targeted.

== Reactions ==
Turkish President Recep Tayyip Erdoğan described the attack as "heinous" and offered his condolences.

== See also ==
- Isla Vista attacks
- Istanbul nightclub shooting
- 2026 Afyonkarahisar shootings
- 2026 Onikişubat school shooting
