= Tateikome =

Town of ancient Lydia

Coordinates: 38°26′26″N 27°44′42″E

Tateikome was a town of ancient Lydia, inhabited during Roman times.

Its site is located near Turgutlu in Asiatic Turkey.
