= Çaldağ mine =

Nickel mine in Turkey

- Location within Turkey
- Interactive map of Çaldağ mine
- Location: Turgutlu, Manisa Province, Turkey; 38°28′30″N 27°42′50″E
- Products: Nickel
- Opened: 2009
- Company: European Nickel

The Çaldağ mine is a large mine in the west of Turkey in Turgutlu District, Manisa Province 232 km west of the capital, Ankara., Çaldağ represents the largest nickel reserve in Turkey having estimated reserves of 33.2 million tonnes of ore grading 1.13% nickel. The 33.2 million tonnes of ore contains 375,000 tonnes of nickel metal.
