= Yiğitpınarı =

Yiğitpınarı can refer to:

- Yiğitpınarı, İhsaniye
- Yiğitpınarı, Pasinler
