= Eskişehir University shooting =

2018 school shooting in Turkey

- Location: Eskişehir Osmangazi University, Eskişehir, Turkey
- Date: 5 April 2018 c. 3:00 p.m. – c. 3:10 p.m. (UTC+3)
- Attack type: mass shooting, school shooting
- Weapon: 9mm CANiK semi-automatic handgun
- Deaths: 4
- Injuries: 3
- Perpetrator: Volkan Bayar

On 5 April 2018, 37-year-old research assistant Volkan Bayar shot and killed four staff members and injured three other people at Eskişehir Osmangazi University in Eskişehir, Eskişehir Province, Turkey.

Bayar surrendered to police after initially trying to escape. Those killed were the deputy dean of the education faculty, Mikail Yalcin; the faculty's secretary, Fatih Özmutlu; lecturer Serdar Caglak; and assistant lecturer Yasir Armagan.

It was considered the deadliest school shooting by a lone gunman in modern Turkish history until the Onikişubat school shooting in 2026.

== Timeline ==
Research assistant Volkan Bayar arrived at the Faculty of Education on the Meşelik Campus of Eskişehir Osmangazi University around 15:00. He first went up to the second floor of the faculty, where he pulled his gun out of his pocket, entered his room, and shot faculty secretary Fatih Özmutlu. After shooting Özmutlu, Bayar went to the next room and shot the Vice Dean Mikail Yalçın there. Bayar then went up to the third floor and shot research assistants Serdar Çağlar and Yasir Armağan. There was great panic in the faculty, where gunshots echoed, and a large number of police and medical teams were dispatched to the campus upon notification.

Time	Event
c. 3:00 p.m.	Volkan Bayar entered the Faculty of Education building and began shooting inside the third-floor offices, targeting several staff members.
c. 3:05 p.m.	The shooting ended after a few minutes, leaving four dead and three injured.
c. 3:10 p.m.	Bayar attempted to flee but was apprehended by police officers without resistance.
c. 3:30 p.m.	Emergency responders arrived at the scene; the university was placed on lockdown and evacuated.

== Trial ==
In connection with the 2018 Eskişehir University shooting, both Volkan Bayar and his ex-wife, Saadet Aylin Bayar, faced serious legal consequences. Bayar was charged with the premeditated murder of the four university staff members, and with the attempted murder of three others who were injured during the attack. The court found him guilty and sentenced him to four life terms in prison.

Saadet Aylin Bayar, Volkan's ex-wife and a fellow research assistant at the university, was detained on suspicion of involvement in the attack. Her detention was part of the broader investigation into the shooting. She was later found guilty and also sentenced to life imprisonment.

The event highlighted significant concerns regarding workplace safety and the handling of internal disputes within academic institutions in Turkey.

== Perpetrator ==
University rector Hasan Gonen described Bayar as a "problematic" person who was being investigated for verbally insulting academic staff as a result of suspected "psychological problems".

Other reports said the attacker had upset colleagues by alleging they were members of the group blamed for the failed 2016 coup in Turkey.

== See also ==
- 2024 Eskişehir stabbing

Other Turkish school shootings:

- Murder of Ibrahim Oktugan
- 2026 Siverek school shooting
- 2026 Onikişubat school shooting
