= 2026 Esenyurt school stabbing =

2026 school stabbing in Turkey

2026 Esenyurt School Stabbing
- Location: Istanbul, Turkey
- Date: 7 October 2026
- Target: Students
- Attack type: Mass stabbing
- Weapon: Knife
- Deaths: 0
- Injuries: 3
- Victims: AEA; EEA; SK
- Perpetrator: A.Ç.
- No. of participants: 1
- Motive: Unknown

The 2026 Esenyurt school stabbing, was an incident that occurred at Sezai Karakoç Anatolian High School (Turkish: Sezai Karakoç Anadolu Lisesi) in the Barbaros Hayrettin Paşa neighborhood of Esenyurt in Istanbul Province, Turkey.

== Stabbing ==
The incident occurred at Sezai Karakoç Anatolian High School around noon. 16-year-old A.Ç. injured 15-year-old AEA, 14-year-old EEA, and 14-year-old SK. In initial statements following the attack, Esenyurt District Governor Fatih Çobanoğlu stated that one of the two students who were attacked was in good condition, while the other was in critical condition. Following the attack, A.Ç. was arrested, and the prosecutor's office ordered the arrest of A.Ç.'s mother, M.Ç.

== Perpetrator ==
It has been determined that the assailant, A.Ç., had previously made social media posts praising the perpetrators of school attacks in Siverek district of Şanlıurfa, in Kahramanmaraş, and in Eskişehir, as well as those who carried out similar acts abroad in Ukraine, Russia, and Austria.

Due to these posts, a public prosecution has been initiated against A.Ç. for the crime of "praising crime and criminals," and his trial is ongoing at the Büyükçekmece 2nd Juvenile Court.

== Reactions ==
Esenyurt District Governor Fatih Çobanoğlu stated: “A student stabbed two classmates in the classroom. The injured were taken to the hospital and are receiving treatment. One of the children is in good condition, with minor injuries. We cannot say that the other is 'not in life-threatening condition'; his treatment is ongoing.”
