= Orhanlı =

Orhanlı can refer to:

- Orhanlı, İhsaniye
- Orhanlı, Niğde
- Orhanlı, Yeşilova
