= Muratlar =

Muratlar may refer to:

- Muratlar, Bayramiç
- Muratlar, Bolu
- Muratlar, İhsaniye
