= Kadımürsel, İhsaniye =

Kadımürsel
- Village
- Location within Turkey Location within Turkey Aegean
- Coordinates: 39°06′N 30°18′E
- Country: Turkey
- Province: Afyonkarahisar
- District: İhsaniye
- Population (2021): 92
- Time zone: UTC+3 (TRT)

Kadımürsel is a village in the İhsaniye District, Afyonkarahisar Province, Turkey. Its population is 92 (2021).
