= Hacıbeyli, İhsaniye =

Hacıbeyli
- Village
- Location within Turkey Location within Turkey Aegean
- Coordinates: 39.0578°N 30.2814°E
- Country: Turkey
- Province: Afyonkarahisar
- District: İhsaniye
- Population (2021): 910
- Time zone: UTC+3 (TRT)

Hacıbeyli is a village in the İhsaniye District, Afyonkarahisar Province, Turkey. Its population is 910 (2021).
