= Osmanköy, İhsaniye =

Osmanköy
- Village
- Location within Turkey Location within Turkey Aegean
- Coordinates: 39.0136°N 30.2858°E
- Country: Turkey
- Province: Afyonkarahisar
- District: İhsaniye
- Population (2021): 685
- Time zone: UTC+3 (TRT)

Osmanköy is a village in the İhsaniye District, Afyonkarahisar Province, Turkey. Its population is 685 (2021).
