= Oğulbeyli, İhsaniye =

Oğulbeyli
- Village
- Location within Turkey Location within Turkey Aegean
- Coordinates: 39°08′N 30°19′E
- Country: Turkey
- Province: Afyonkarahisar
- District: İhsaniye
- Population (2021): 89
- Time zone: UTC+3 (TRT)

Location of Oğulbeyli, İhsaniye

Oğulbeyli is a village in the İhsaniye District, Afyonkarahisar Province, Turkey. Its population is 89 (2021).
