= İğdemir, İhsaniye =

İğdemir
- Village
- Location within Turkey Location within Turkey Aegean
- Coordinates: 38°58′N 30°30′E
- Country: Turkey
- Province: Afyonkarahisar
- District: İhsaniye
- Population (2021): 75
- Time zone: UTC+3 (TRT)

İğdemir is a village in the İhsaniye District, Afyonkarahisar Province, Turkey. Its population is 75 (2021).
