= Basırlar, İhsaniye =

Basırlar
- Village
- Location within Turkey Location within Turkey Aegean
- Coordinates: 39°04′N 30°35′E
- Country: Turkey
- Province: Afyonkarahisar
- District: İhsaniye
- Population (2021): 79
- Time zone: UTC+3 (TRT)

Basırlar is a village in the İhsaniye District, Afyonkarahisar Province, Turkey. Its population is 79 (2021).
