= Bayramaliler, İhsaniye =

Bayramaliler
- Village
- Location within Turkey Location within Turkey Aegean
- Coordinates: 39°05′N 30°29′E
- Country: Turkey
- Province: Afyonkarahisar
- District: İhsaniye
- Population (2021): 341
- Time zone: UTC+3 (TRT)

Bayramaliler is a village in the İhsaniye District, Afyonkarahisar Province, Turkey. Its population is 341 (2021).
