= Kumarlı, Kahramanmaraş =

Kumarlı
- Neighbourhood
- Location in Turkey
- Coordinates: 37°50′20″N 36°32′10″E
- Country: Turkey
- Province: Kahramanmaraş
- District: Onikişubat
- Population (2022): 573
- Time zone: UTC+3 (TRT)

Kumarlı is a neighbourhood of the municipality and district of Onikişubat, Kahramanmaraş Province, Turkey. Its population is 573 (2022).
