= Demirli, İhsaniye =

Demirli
- Village
- Location within Turkey Location within Turkey Aegean
- Coordinates: 39°04′40″N 30°30′28″E
- Country: Turkey
- Province: Afyonkarahisar
- District: İhsaniye
- Population (2021): 161
- Time zone: UTC+3 (TRT)

Demirli is a village in the İhsaniye District, Afyonkarahisar Province, Turkey. Its population is 161 (2021).
