= Üçlerkayası, İhsaniye =

Üçlerkayası
- Village
- Location within Turkey Location within Turkey Aegean
- Coordinates: 39°05′N 30°25′E
- Country: Turkey
- Province: Afyonkarahisar
- District: İhsaniye
- Population (2021): 427
- Time zone: UTC+3 (TRT)

Üçlerkayası is a village in the İhsaniye District, Afyonkarahisar Province, Turkey. Its population is 427 (2021).
