= Cumalı, İhsaniye =

Village in Afyonkarahisar Province, Turkey

Cumalı
- Village
- Location within Turkey Location within Turkey Aegean
- Coordinates: 38.9880°N 30.3152°E
- Country: Turkey
- Province: Afyonkarahisar
- District: İhsaniye
- Population (2021): 117
- Time zone: UTC+3 (TRT)

Cumalı is a village in the İhsaniye District, Afyonkarahisar Province, Turkey. Its population is 117 (2021).
