= Kayıhan, İhsaniye =

Kayıhan
- Municipality
- Location within Turkey Location within Turkey Aegean
- Coordinates: 39°00′N 30°30′E
- Country: Turkey
- Province: Afyonkarahisar
- District: İhsaniye
- Population (2022): 2,119
- Time zone: UTC+3 (TRT)

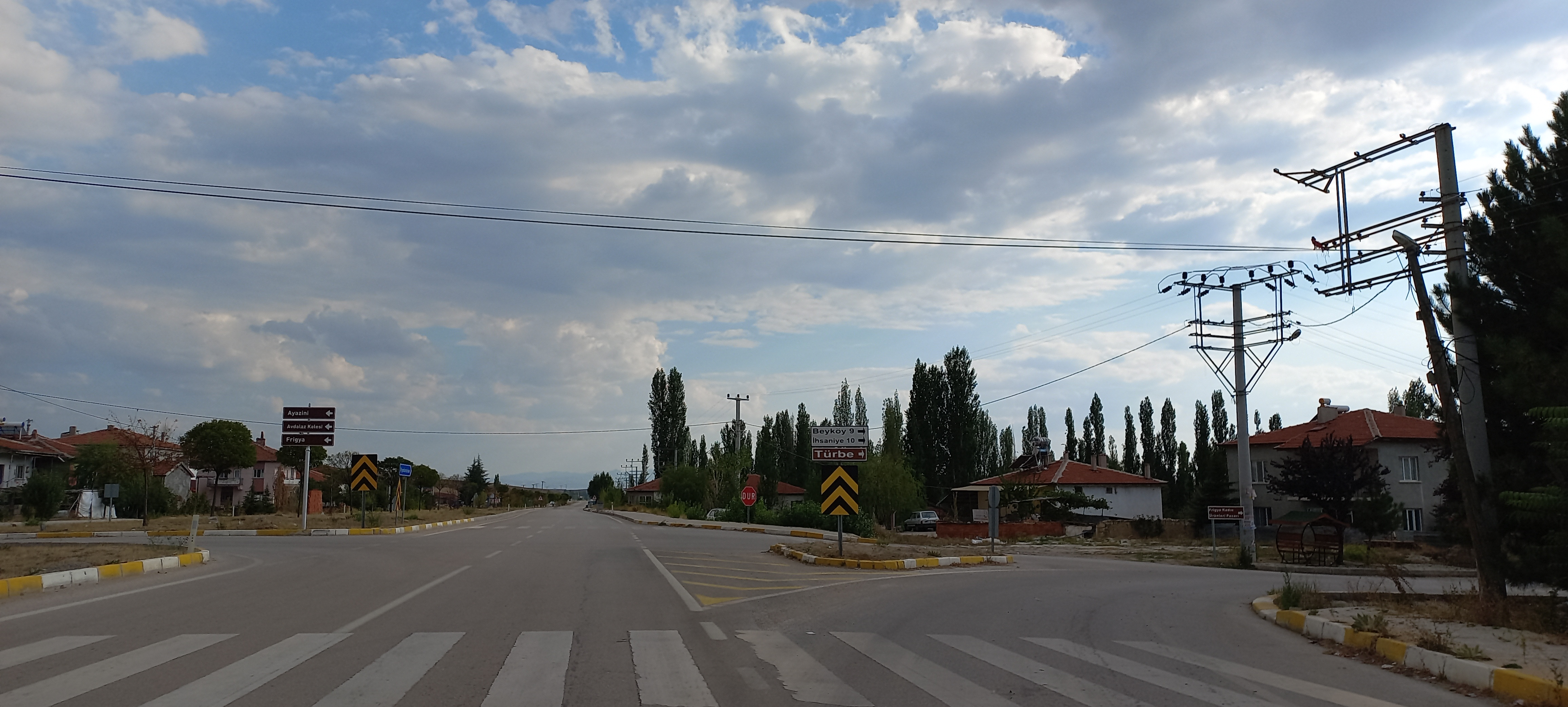
State Road D-665 (Turkey) – Kayıhan junction - 09.09.2024

Kayıhan is a town (belde) and municipality in the İhsaniye District, Afyonkarahisar Province, Turkey. Its population is 2,119 (2022). The Kayıhan municipality was created in 1989 by the consolidation of the villages of Tekke, Garen, and Kunduzlu. Kayıhan's current neighborhoods include Pınar, Cumhuriyet, Türbe, and Kunduzlu.

Adjacent to Kayıhan's Hayran Veli Mosque is the tomb of Hayran Veli Sultan, said to be a folk healer from Khorasan. Near Kayıhan are various ruins of the Göynüş Valley (the "Phrygian Valley") such as the Aslantaş ("lion stone").

The name "Kayıhan" is said to come from the Kayı tribe to which Oghuz Khan belonged. The settlement was also formerly known as "Kaya-Viran" (rock ruin), after being destroyed in an earthquake.

== Population ==
Historical population
Year	Pop.	±% p.a.
1940	656	—
1945	640	−0.49%
1960	850	+1.91%
1997	2,698	+3.17%
2007	2,576	−0.46%
2012	2,201	−3.10%
2017	2,103	−0.91%
2022	2,119	+0.15%
Source: Population censuses (1940-1997) and TÜIK (2007-2022)
