= Aşağıtandır, İhsaniye =

Aşağıtandır
- Village
- Location within Turkey Location within Turkey Aegean
- Coordinates: 38°57′N 30°26′E
- Country: Turkey
- Province: Afyonkarahisar
- District: İhsaniye
- Population (2021): 550
- Time zone: UTC+3 (TRT)

Aşağıtandır is a village in the İhsaniye District, Afyonkarahisar Province, Turkey. Its population is 550 (2021).
