= Karacaahmet, İhsaniye =

Karacaahmet
- Village
- Location within Turkey Location within Turkey Aegean
- Coordinates: 39.0303°N 30.3469°E
- Country: Turkey
- Province: Afyonkarahisar
- District: İhsaniye
- Population (2021): 1,564
- Time zone: UTC+3 (TRT)

Karacaahmet is a village in the İhsaniye District, Afyonkarahisar Province, Turkey. Its population is 1,564 (2021). Before the 2013 reorganisation, it was a town (belde).
