= Yenice, İhsaniye =

Yenice
- Village
- Location within Turkey Location within Turkey Aegean
- Coordinates: 38.9728°N 30.2900°E
- Country: Turkey
- Province: Afyonkarahisar
- District: İhsaniye
- Population (2021): 50
- Time zone: UTC+3 (TRT)

Yenice is a village in the İhsaniye District, Afyonkarahisar Province, Turkey. Its population is 50 (2021).
