= Sarıcaova, İhsaniye =

Sarıcaova
- Village
- Location within Turkey Location within Turkey Aegean
- Coordinates: 39.1514°N 30.5047°E
- Country: Turkey
- Province: Afyonkarahisar
- District: İhsaniye
- Population (2021): 21
- Time zone: UTC+3 (TRT)

Sarıcaova is a village in the İhsaniye District, Afyonkarahisar Province, Turkey. Its population is 21 (2021).
