= Eynehankuzviran, İhsaniye =

Eynehankuzviran
- Village
- Location within Turkey Location within Turkey Aegean
- Coordinates: 39°01′N 30°38′E
- Country: Turkey
- Province: Afyonkarahisar
- District: İhsaniye
- Population (2021): 240
- Time zone: UTC+3 (TRT)

Eynehankuzviran is a village in the İhsaniye District, Afyonkarahisar Province, Turkey. Its population is 240 (2021).
