= Yaylabağı =

- Municipality
- Location in Turkey Yaylabağı (Turkey Aegean)
- Coordinates: 38°58′27″N 30°32′25″E
- Country: Turkey
- Province: Afyonkarahisar
- District: İhsaniye
- Population (2021): 2,238
- Time zone: UTC+3 (TRT)

Yaylabağı is a town (belde) and municipality in the İhsaniye District, Afyonkarahisar Province, Turkey. Its population is 2,238 (2021).
