= Sinirli, Turgutlu =

Sinirli
- Neighbourhood
- Location in Turkey Sinirli (Turkey Aegean)
- Coordinates: 38°36′N 27°41′E
- Country: Turkey
- Province: Manisa
- District: Turgutlu
- Population (2022): 211
- Time zone: UTC+3 (TRT)

Sinirli is a neighbourhood of the municipality and district of Turgutlu, Manisa Province, Turkey. Its population is 211 (2022). The village is 50 km away from the centre of Manisa city. The people of the village immigrated from Yugoslavia. The people of the village were called Muhacir which means Emigrator.
