= Sırapınar, Çekmeköy =

Neighborhood in Çekmeköy district, Istanbul, Turkey

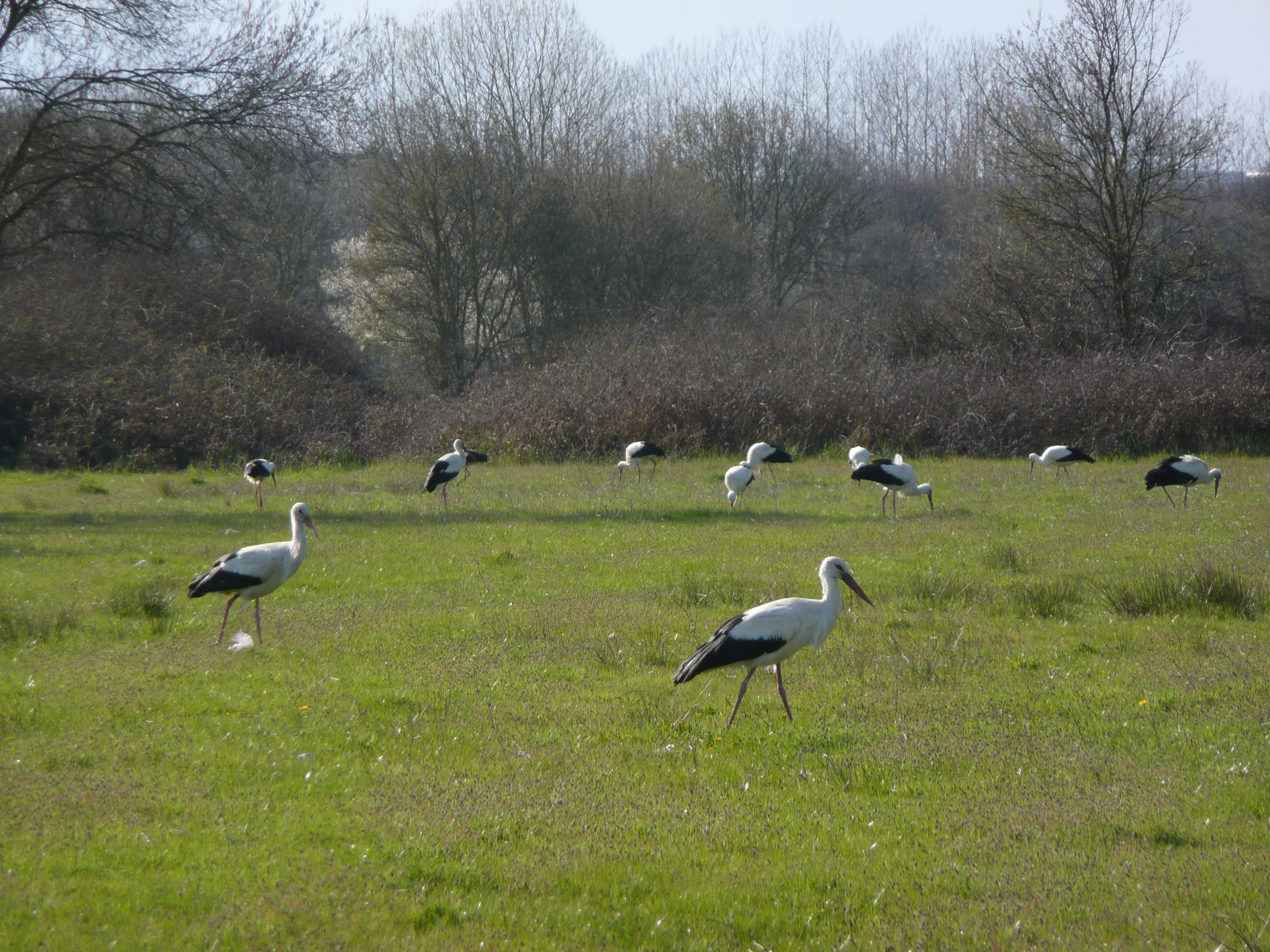
storks foraging in Sırapınar

Sırapınar is a neighborhood in the Çekmeköy district on the Anatolian side of the Istanbul province, Turkey.

== Demographics ==
Its population is 1,193 (2024).

== Location ==
It is bordered on the north by the Hüseyinli neighborhood in Çekmeköy, on the northeast by the Avcıkoru neighborhood in Şile, and on the east, south, and west by the Ömerli neighborhood in Çekmeköy.

== Name ==
The locality is listed as the village of Sırapınar and Ayna Hoca (or possibly Eyne Hoca or İne Hoca) in imperial records of 1519-20. It is listed as Sira Pinar (صره بيكار) in a 1928 government publication. The name Sırapınar means literally "row spring" (or "row of springs"; Turkish: sıra + pınar) and may refer to the many water sources in the area.

== Population ==
Population of Sırapınar through the years:

- 124 (estimated, 1832)
- 92 (estimated, 1840)
- 80 (estimated, 1844)
- 214 (1938)
- 292 (1960)
- 247 (1975)
- 323 (1980)
- 667 (2000)
- 823 (2012)
- 881 (2013)
- 838 (2014)
- 860 (2015)
- 856 (2016)
- 885 (2017)
- 907 (2018)
- 940 (2019)
- 1,000 (2020)
- 1,093 (2021)
- 1,151 (2022)
- 1,183 (2023)
