= Kaburgediği, Tarsus =

Kaburgediği
- Neighbourhood
- Location in Turkey
- Coordinates: 37°09′N 34°48′E
- Country: Turkey
- Province: Mersin
- District: Tarsus
- Elevation: 700 m (2,300 ft)
- Population (2022): 156
- Time zone: UTC+3 (TRT)
- Area code: 0324

Kaburgediği is a neighbourhood in the municipality and district of Tarsus, Mersin Province, Turkey. Its population is 156 (2022). It is situated in the Taurus Mountains. Its distance to Tarsus is 37 kilometres (23 mi) and its distance to Mersin is 61 kilometres (38 mi). The village is inhabited by Tahtacı.
