= Kıyır, İhsaniye =

Kıyır
- Village
- Location within Turkey Location within Turkey Aegean
- Coordinates: 39°02′N 30°41′E
- Country: Turkey
- Province: Afyonkarahisar
- District: İhsaniye
- Population (2021): 268
- Time zone: UTC+3 (TRT)

Kıyır is a village in the İhsaniye District, Afyonkarahisar Province, Turkey. Its population is 268 (2021).
