= Orhanlı, İhsaniye =

Orhanlı
- Village
- Location within Turkey Location within Turkey Aegean
- Coordinates: 39.0839°N 30.2908°E
- Country: Turkey
- Province: Afyonkarahisar
- District: İhsaniye
- Population (2021): 83
- Time zone: UTC+3 (TRT)

Orhanlı is a village in the İhsaniye District, Afyonkarahisar Province, Turkey. Its population is 83 (2021).
