= Bozhüyük, İhsaniye =

Bozhüyük
- Village
- Location within Turkey Location within Turkey Aegean
- Coordinates: 38.9567°N 30.5803°E
- Country: Turkey
- Province: Afyonkarahisar
- District: İhsaniye
- Population (2021): 1,710
- Time zone: UTC+3 (TRT)

Bozhüyük is a village in the İhsaniye District, Afyonkarahisar Province, Turkey. Its population is 1,710 (2021). Before the 2013 reorganisation, it was a town (belde).
