= Ablak (saint) =

- Venerated in: Ethiopian Orthodox Tewahedo Church
- Feast: 30 May

Ablak is a saint of the Ethiopian Orthodox Tewahedo Church. His feast day is kept on 30 May.

== Sources ==
- Holweck, F. G. A Biographical Dictionary of the Saints. St. Louis, Missouri, US: B. Herder Book Co. 1924.
