= Yukarıtandır, İhsaniye =

Yukarıtandır
- Village
- Location within Turkey Location within Turkey Aegean
- Coordinates: 38°56′N 30°27′E
- Country: Turkey
- Province: Afyonkarahisar
- District: İhsaniye
- Population (2021): 746
- Time zone: UTC+3 (TRT)

Yukarıtandır is a village in the İhsaniye District, Afyonkarahisar Province, Turkey. Its population is 746 (2021).
