= Gazlıgöl, İhsaniye =

Gazlıgöl
- Municipality
- Location within Turkey Location within Turkey Aegean
- Coordinates: 38°56′05″N 30°29′54″E
- Country: Turkey
- Province: Afyonkarahisar
- District: İhsaniye
- Population (2021): 2,486
- Time zone: UTC+3 (TRT)

Gazlıgöl is a town (belde) and municipality in the İhsaniye District, Afyonkarahisar Province, Turkey. Its population is 2,486 (2021).
