= İhsaniye District =

- District
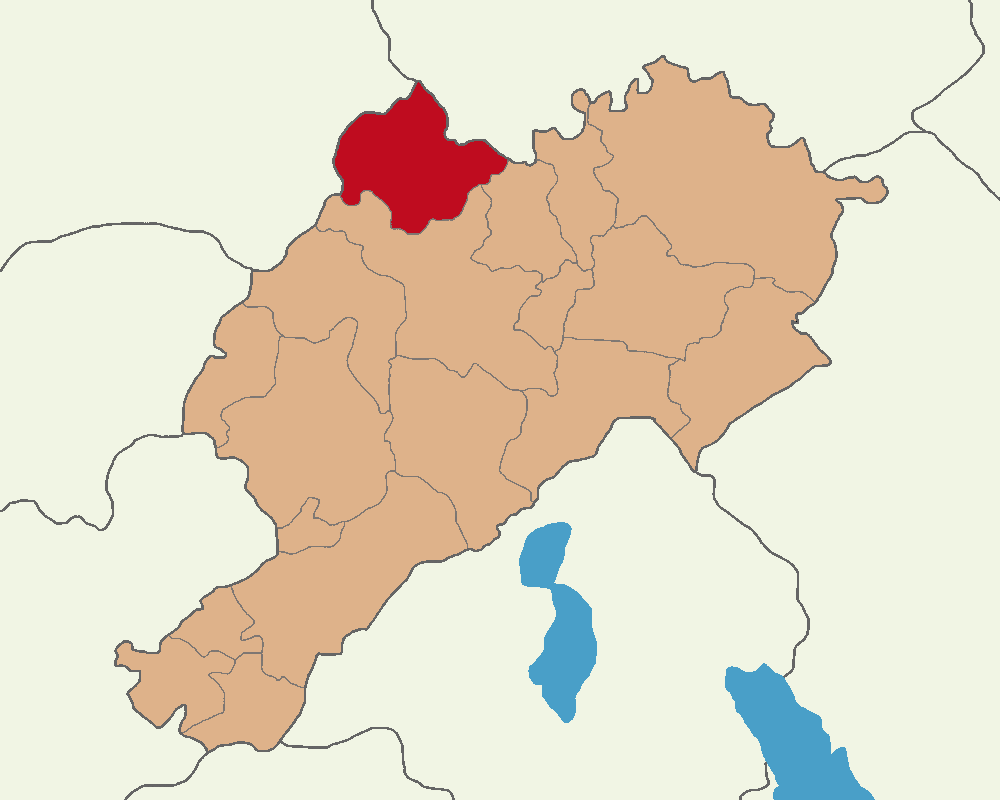
- Map showing İhsaniye District in Afyonkarahisar Province

- Location in Turkey İhsaniye District (Turkey Aegean)
- Coordinates: 39°02′N 30°25′E
- Country: Turkey
- Province: Afyonkarahisar
- Seat: İhsaniye

Government
  - Kaymakam: Ömer Faruk İlhan
- Area: 849 km^{2} (328 sq mi)
- Population (2021): 27,455
  - Density: 32.3/km^{2} (83.8/sq mi)
- Time zone: UTC+3 (TRT)

İhsaniye District is a district of Afyonkarahisar Province of Turkey. Its seat is the town İhsaniye. Its area is 849 km^{2}, and its population is 27,455 (2021).

== Composition ==
There are 5 municipalities in İhsaniye District:

- Döğer
- Gazlıgöl
- İhsaniye
- Kayıhan
- Yaylabağı

There are 26 villages in İhsaniye District:

- Ablak
- Aşağıtandır
- Ayazini
- Basırlar
- Bayramaliler
- Beyköy
- Bozhüyük
- Cumalı
- Demirli
- Eskieymir
- Eynehankuzviran
- Hacıbeyli
- İğdemir
- Kadımürsel
- Karacaahmet
- Kıyır
- Muratlar
- Oğulbeyli
- Orhanlı
- Osmanköy
- Sarıcaova
- Üçlerkayası
- Yenice
- Yeşilyayla
- Yiğitpınarı
- Yukarıtandır
