= Muratlar, İhsaniye =

Muratlar
- Village
- Location within Turkey Location within Turkey Aegean
- Coordinates: 39.0597°N 30.3639°E
- Country: Turkey
- Province: Afyonkarahisar
- District: İhsaniye
- Population (2021): 691
- Time zone: UTC+3 (TRT)

Muratlar is a village in the İhsaniye District, Afyonkarahisar Province, Turkey. Its population is 691 (2021).
