= Yiğitpınarı, İhsaniye =

Yiğitpınarı
- Village
- Location within Turkey Location within Turkey Aegean
- Country: Turkey
- Province: Afyonkarahisar
- District: İhsaniye
- Population (2021): 51
- Time zone: UTC+3 (TRT)

Yiğitpınarı is a village in the İhsaniye District, Afyonkarahisar Province, Turkey. Its population is 51 (2021).
