= Ablak, İhsaniye =

Ablak
- Village
- Location within Turkey Location within Turkey Aegean
- Coordinates: 38.96322°N 30.47465°E
- Country: Turkey
- Province: Afyonkarahisar
- District: İhsaniye
- Population (2021): 253
- Time zone: UTC+3 (TRT)

Ablak is a village in the İhsaniye District, Afyonkarahisar Province, Turkey. Its population is 253 (2021).
