= Ayazini, İhsaniye =

Ayazini
- Village
- Location within Turkey Location within Turkey Aegean
- Coordinates: 39°00′50″N 30°34′30″E
- Country: Turkey
- Province: Afyonkarahisar
- District: İhsaniye

Government
  - Muhtar: Bekir Yılmaz
- Population (2021): 945
- Time zone: UTC+3 (TRT)
- Postal code: 03380
- Area code: 0272

Ayazini is a village in the İhsaniye District, Afyonkarahisar Province, Turkey. Its population is 945 (2021). It is a historical settlement settled by Phrygians, Ancient Romans, Medieval Greeks, and Seljuks. There are dwellings, churches, and tomb chambers in rock-cut architecture at the archaeological site.

== Overview ==
The name of the settlement, a Turkish derivation of the Greek "Aya Sion" (Greek: Αγία Σιών), was changed to "Ayazin" in 1910.

Ayazini took the municipality status on 29 December 1998. The status was revoked at the 2013 reorganisation due to the decrease of the village population to under 2,000. The village headman is Bekir Yılmaz.

== Location ==
Ayazini is located north of Afyonkarahisar, and reachable 4.7 km (2.9 mi) east of the Afyonkarahisar-Eskişehir highway D.665 27 km (17 mi). It is situated in the so-called "Phrygian Valley".

== History ==
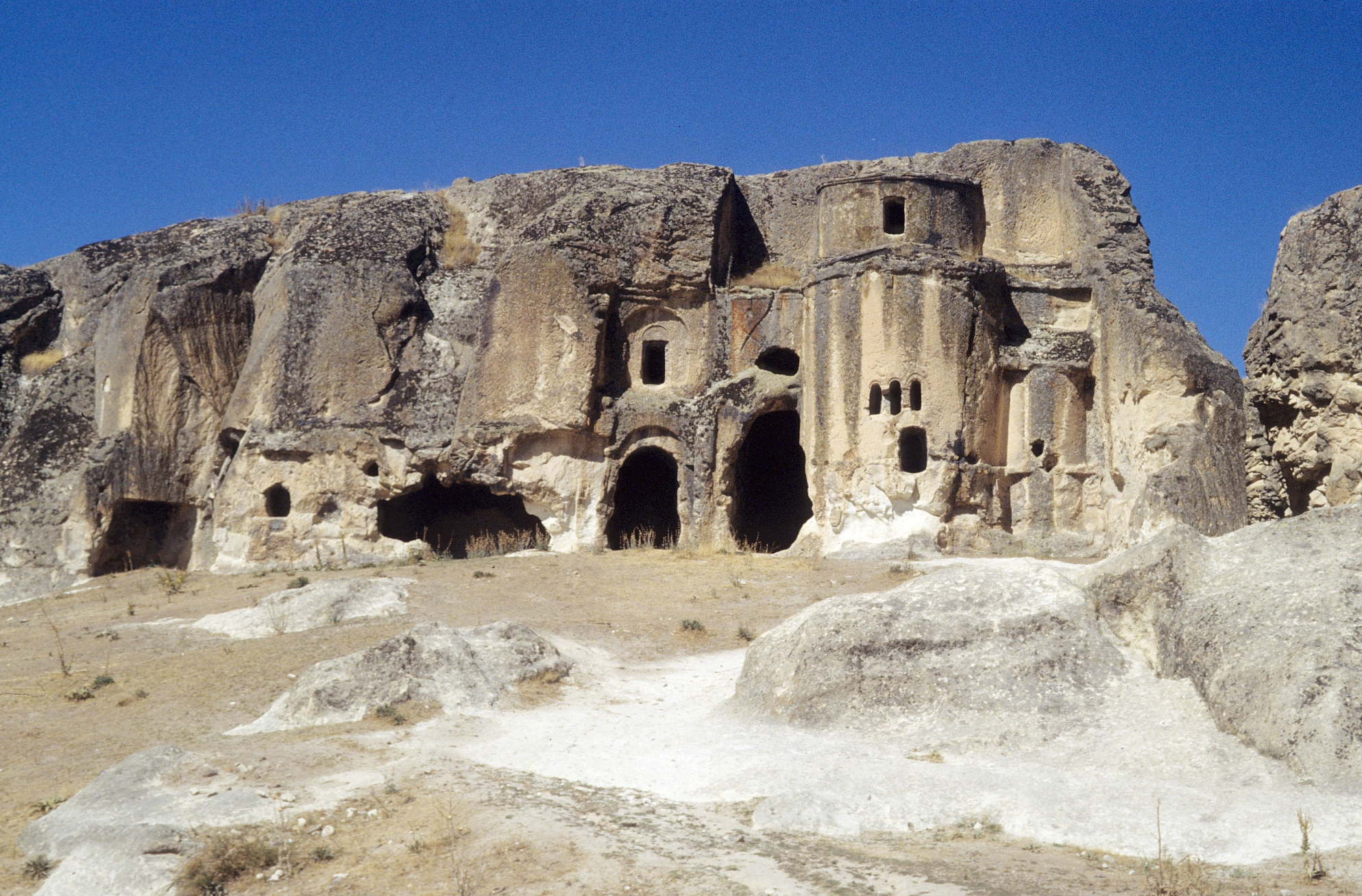
Rock-cut Byzantine church.

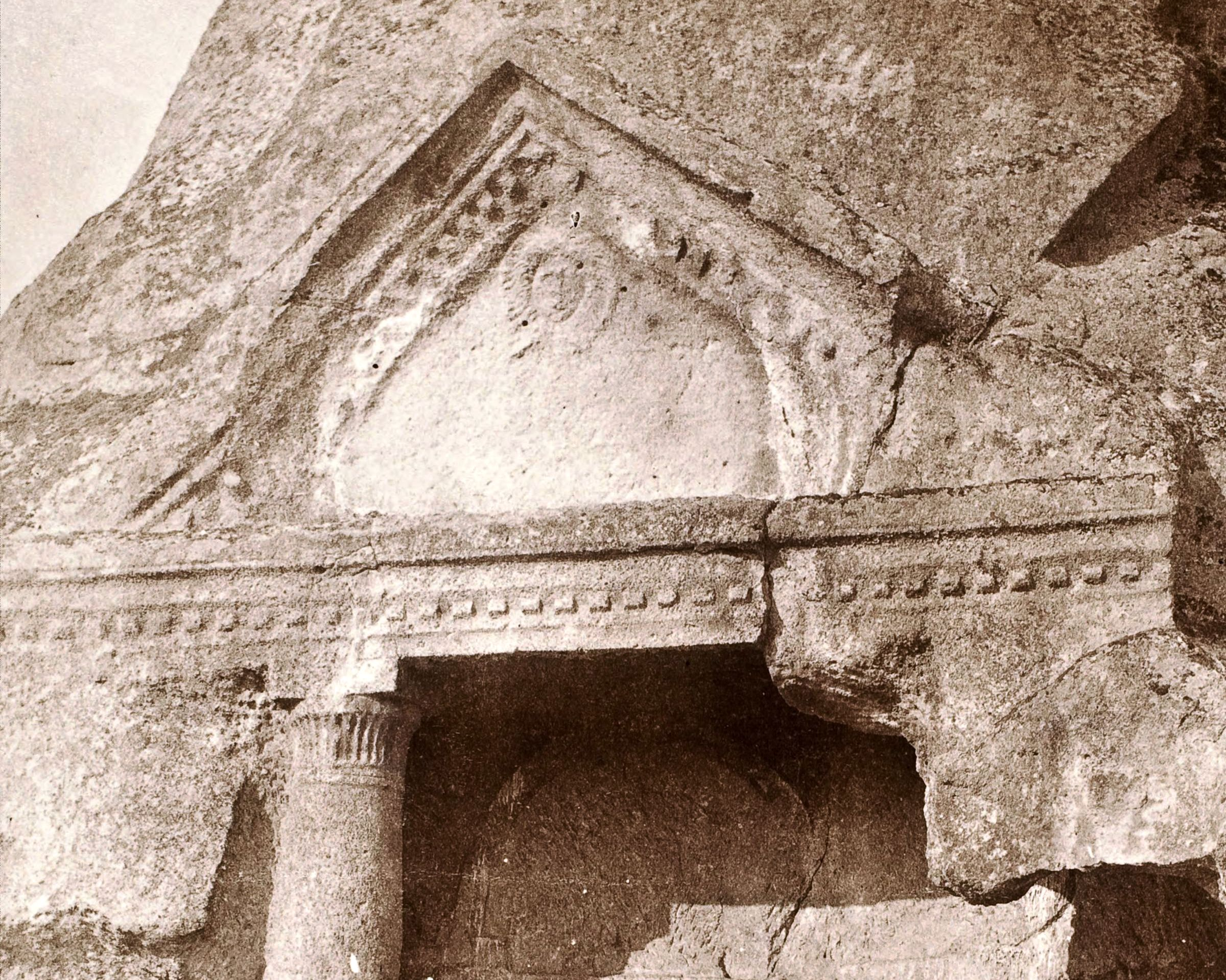
Rock-carved Ancient Roman tomb with Medusa relief.

The location has been used as a settlement since the Phrygian Period. There are family and single-person rock tomb chambers with lion figures and columns from the Roman and Byzantine periods, churches and rock dwellings from the Byzantine Period, thanks to carving-suitable rocks. In addition there is the Avdalaz Castle with a cistern carved into massive rock. After the Byzantine era, the site was settled by the Seljuks. It was reported that there are more than 300 caves in various size used as dwelling and 35 churches and chapels.

Rock-carved dwellings

Rock dwellings from the Early Byzantine Period are found in the entrance and inside the village. The dwellings have single rooms, rooms grouped side by side or one over the other. Some are accessible by steps or by tunnel-shaped passages from other rooms. In some rooms, there are benches and niches of various size for storing objects and candles or oil lamps. The rock dwellings on both sides of the entrance to Avdalaz Valley are large. The dwellings on one side is in multi-story form. In the inside, there are deep pits used as a hearth and warehouse. A circular room featuring seats side by side around the walls is accessible by an inclined tunnel. Next to this section, a slightly-elevated toilet room is carved into rock.

Castle dwelling

There are multi-story dwellings resembling today's apartments in the rock-carved castle at the upper end of the Avdalaz Valley. A cistern is carved on the castle's ground.

Rock church

A church structure carved into steep tuff rock is situated at the entrance to Ayazini. It has an apse and a dome. Built in the 1000s, it has a monastery structure with the adjacent rock chambers.

Rock-cut tombs

The facade of the rock-carved tombs are in the form of columned openings arched with a figure of Medusa. Some tombs are decorated with lion figure reliefs. On one tomb, the owner couple is depicted.

== Tourism ==
The Governor of Afyonkarahisar Province started the establishment of the "Phrygia Open-air Museum" with a visitor center under the project of "Restoration of Ayazini and Improvement of Village Streets". The Provincial Directorate of Culture and Tourism and the Department of Archaeology of the Afyon Kocatepe University support the project.
