= Karakütük, Tarsus =

Karakütük
- Neighbourhood
- Location in Turkey
- Coordinates: 37°10′N 34°51′E
- Country: Turkey
- Province: Mersin
- District: Tarsus
- Elevation: 750 m (2,460 ft)
- Population (2022): 298
- Time zone: UTC+3 (TRT)
- Area code: 0324

Karakütük is a neighbourhood in the municipality and district of Tarsus, Mersin Province, Turkey. Its population is 298 (2022). It is in the Toros Mountains and to the west of Turkish state highway O.51. It is 35 kilometres (22 mi) to Tarsus and 60 kilometres (37 mi) to Mersin. The main economic activity of the village is agriculture.
