= Çekmeköy =

- District and municipality
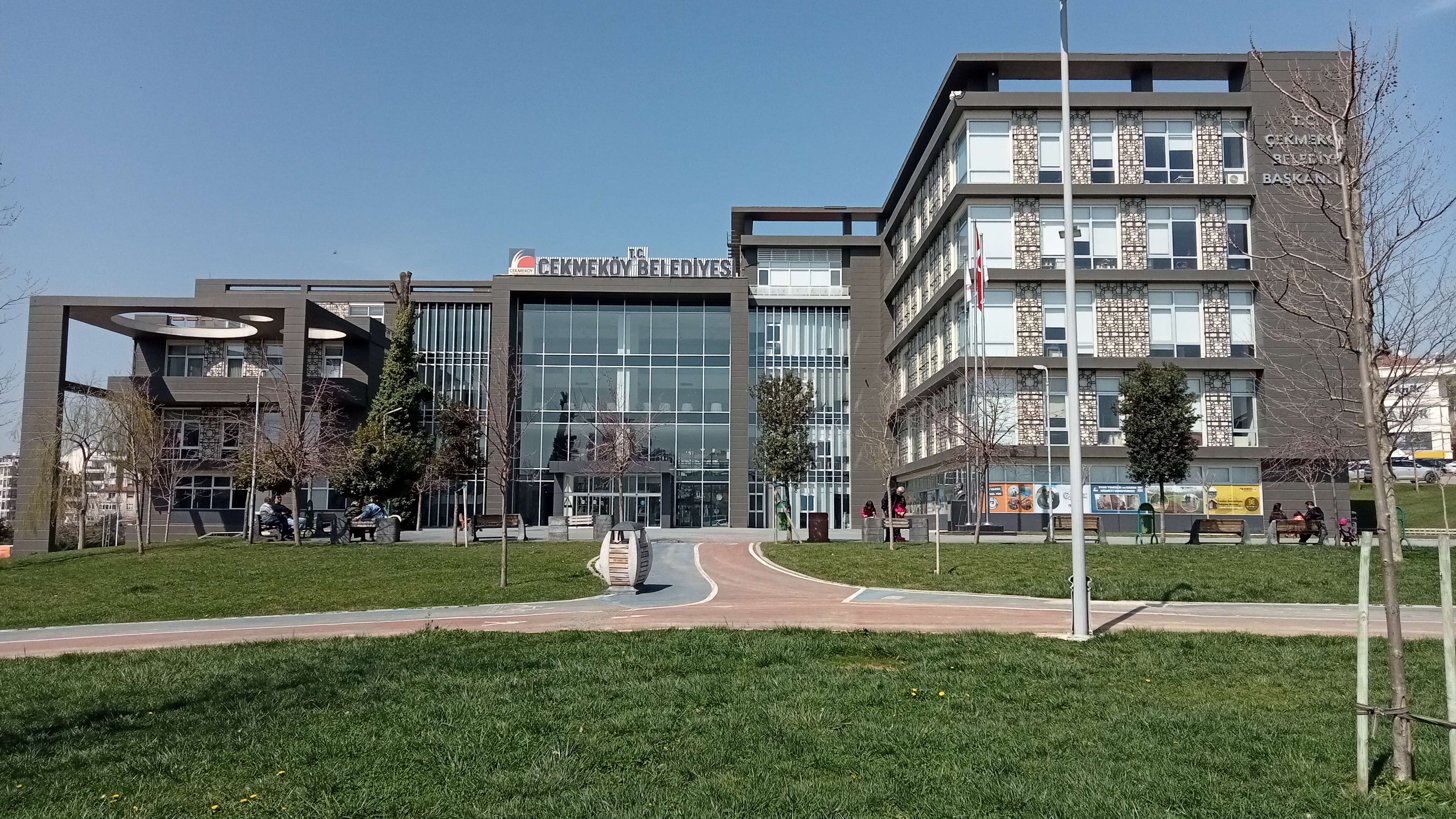
- Çekmeköy Municipality Building

- Logo

- Map showing Çekmeköy District in Istanbul Province

- Location within Turkey Location within Istanbul
- Coordinates: 41°02′13″N 29°10′43″E
- Country: Turkey
- Province: Istanbul

Government
  - Mayor: Orhan Çerkez (AKP)
- Area: 152 km^{2} (59 sq mi)
- Population (2022): 296,066
  - Density: 1,950/km^{2} (5,040/sq mi)
- Time zone: UTC+3 (TRT)
- Area code: 0216
- Website: www.cekmekoy.bel.tr

Çekmeköy is a municipality and district of Istanbul Province, Turkey. Its area is 152 km^{2}, and its population is 296,066 (2022). It is on the Asian side of Istanbul.

In 2008 the district Çekmeköy was created from part of the district Ümraniye, including the former municipalities Çekmeköy, Taşdelen, Alemdağ and Ömerli. The urban part of the new district, 17 neighbourhoods, was established as a municipality. At the 2013 Turkish local government reorganisation, the rural part of the district was integrated into the municipality, the villages becoming neighbourhoods. Its first mayor, Ahmet Poyraz, was elected in the 2009 Turkish local elections from (AKP).

The district is also home to one of the leading foundation universities, namely the Özyeğin University.

== History ==
In March 2026, a vocational school in Çekmeköy was the site of a school stabbing perpetrated by a 17-year-old student.

== Neighbourhoods ==
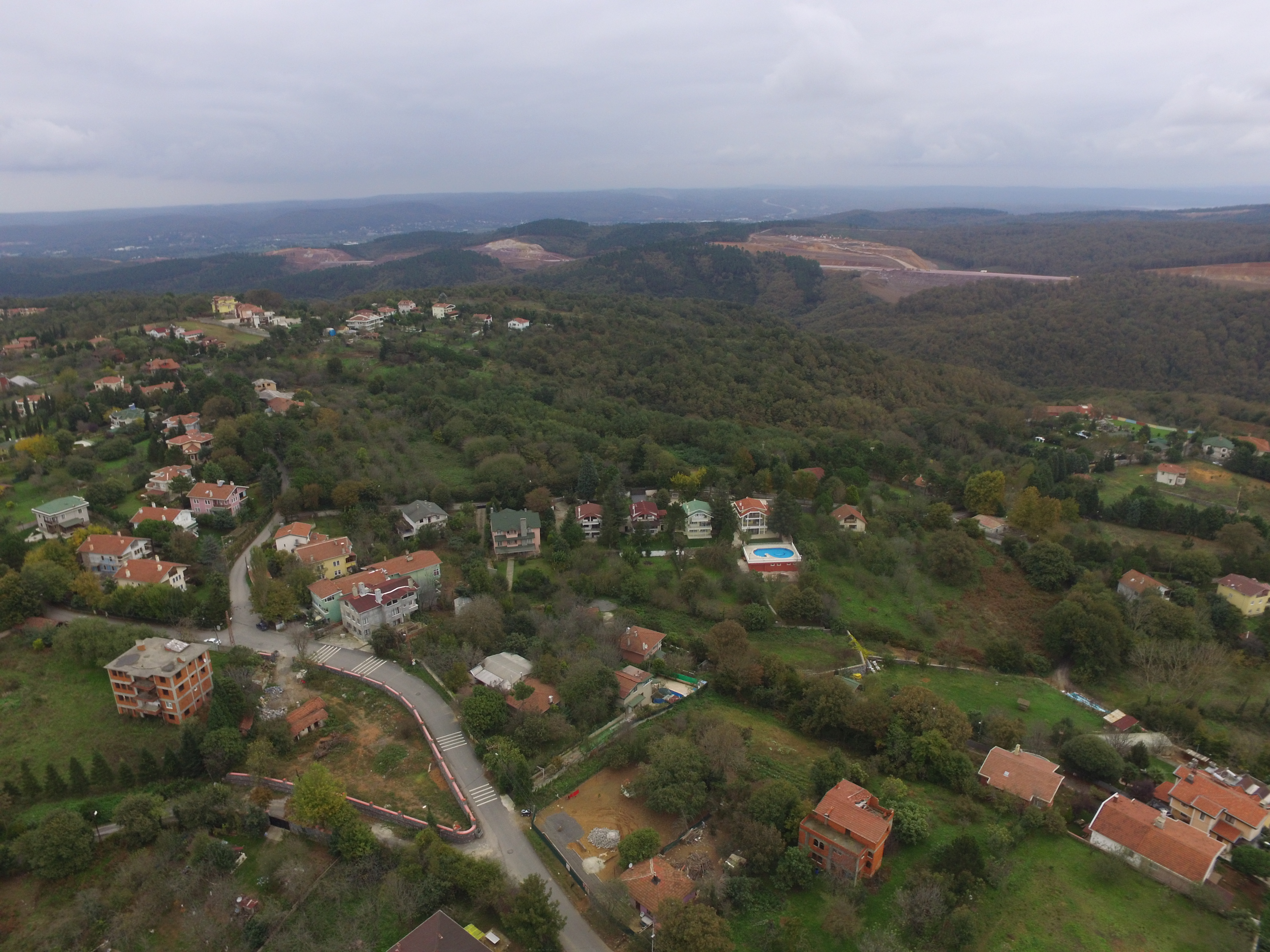
Reşadiye Neighborhood

Neighbourhoods of Çekmeköy

There are 21 neighbourhoods in Çekmeköy District:

- Alemdağ
- Aydınlar
- Çamlık
- Çatalmeşe
- Cumhuriyet
- Ekşioğlu
- Güngören
- Hamidiye
- Hüseyinli
- Kirazlıdere
- Koçullu
- Mehmet Akif
- Merkez
- Mimar Sinan
- Nişantepe
- Ömerli
- Reşadiye
- Sırapınar
- Soğukpınar
- Sultançiftliği
- Taşdelen
