= Murder of İbrahim Oktugan =

2024 shooting of Turkish school principal

Ibrahim Oktugan
- Born: 1950; Istanbul, Turkey
- Died: May 7, 2024 (aged 73–74); Eyüpsultan, Istanbul, Turkey
- Cause of death: Gunshot wounds
- Occupation: Principal
- Known for: Victim of murder on the school grounds

On 7 May 2024, İbrahim Oktugan, a 74-year-old principal of a private high school in Istanbul's Eyüpsultan district, was fatally shot by a former student identified as Yousif K., a 17-year-old of Iraqi origin who held Turkish citizenship. The suspect had been expelled from the school approximately five months earlier due to disciplinary issues. On the day of the attack, he returned to the school, entered Oktugan's office, and shot him five times. Oktugan was transported to a hospital but died from his injuries despite emergency medical treatment.

School officials stated that Oktugan had expelled the suspect following repeated behavioral problems, and the expulsion was cited as the motive for the murder. Kadriye Deveci, a teacher at the school, described the student as "very problematic" in an interview with Rawin, stating that Oktugan believed that the student was "not a good example" and was frequently disrespectful toward teachers. Deveci added that the family had attempted to contest the expulsion, but school authorities ultimately decided they could no longer tolerate the student's conduct. Following the killing, family members, colleagues, and students gathered to protest the murder, calling on authorities to take stronger measures to protect educators and address violence within the education sector.

== Shooting ==
On May 7, 2024, a person identified by police as Yousif K. entered Oktugan's office and fatally shot him. Reports from authorities suggest that the shooter was a former student of Iraqi origin.

The student had been expelled from the school in December 2023 following repeated disciplinary incidents involving conflicts with teachers and school administration. According to reports, Yousif K. returned to the school approximately five months after his expulsion and entered Oktugan's office, where he shot the principal five times with a firearm he had brought with him, inflicting critical injuries. Oktugan was taken to a hospital but died despite medical treatment.

After the shooting, the suspect fled the scene. He was later apprehended by Eyüpsultan police and placed in detention before being transferred to the juvenile police bureau and subsequently to a courthouse for further legal proceedings.

Yousif K. had a criminal record, including offenses related to weapon possession and assault. Following the killing, he allegedly shared a video on social media in which he claimed responsibility for the shooting.

Security camera footage reportedly showed the suspect entering and exiting the principal's room within approximately 20 seconds while visibly carrying a firearm.

== Reactions ==
Following the shooting, education unions across Turkey organised nationwide strikes and demonstrations to protest violence against educators.

On 10 May 2024, teachers held protests in all 81 provinces, calling for stronger safety measures in schools. In Ankara, demonstrators gathered in front of the Ministry of National Education and marched to the Grand National Assembly, while parallel protests took place in Istanbul and other provinces at local education directorates. Reports indicated that many parents kept their children at home, leaving numerous schools largely empty.

In Istanbul, teachers and union members gathered at Beyazıt Square and marched to the Istanbul Provincial Directorate of National Education following a call by multiple unions. Many educators supported the protest through a one-day strike, refraining from teaching and administrative duties.

In response, Deputy President Cevdet Yılmaz, along with Interior Minister Ali Yerlikaya, Justice Minister Yılmaz Tunç, and Education Minister Yusuf Tekin, visited Ankara Atatürk High School. Yilmaz stated that legislative measures were being prepared to address violence against teachers and condemned attacks on education professionals.

The Education and Science Workers' Union (Eğitim-Sen) said the protests also aimed to highlight systemic problems within the education system that it argued contributed to the killing. Speaking to BBC Turkish, Eğitim-Sen Branch No. 1 President Barış Uluocak said that tens of thousands of teachers participated in the Istanbul protest.

== Trial ==
On 5 February 2025, the trial began in the Eyüpsultan district of Istanbul. During the hearing at the Istanbul 1st Heavy Penal Court, suspect Yousif K., a minor accused of involvement in the crime, and the family of the deceased Ibrahim Oktugan were present as "complainants." Two other minors involved in the crime, who were not detained, and the defendant Muhammed Günay G., along with the parties' lawyers, also attended the court.

In his defense, Yousif K. stated that he was a person who constantly uses a weapon, saying, "Defendant Muhammed Günay provoked me; otherwise, I would not kill anyone. I experienced racism; whoever is provoked would experience this incident. I was not expelled from school; this is in my E-school system. When they saw me at school, they did not open the door."

Defendant Muhammed Günay G. stated in his defense, "Yousif K. confronted İbrahim Hoca at school and approached him aggressively. I was afraid he would make a wrong move. I do not agree with his statements that I provoked him. A person who constantly does such things and carries a weapon, I did not provoke him in any way."

The wife of the deceased İbrahim Oktugan, Fatma Oktugan, said, "My husband served this country and many students for 56 years. He loved his children and his country very much; he was someone who touched everyone's life. I am a retired teacher; I have never heard any bad words from my husband. He was a very enlightened person; he taught all teachers. They called him a martyr, but he was not given martyrdom. What did he do to deserve this? I am a complainant. I want my husband's blood not to be left on the ground."

The lawyer of the complainant Oktugan family, İbrahim Ethem Abikoğlu, stated that the defendant was born in Iraq and expressed that he might be over 18 years old at the time of the murder, adding that they requested a report from the Forensic Medicine Institution for bone age determination.

The court, announcing its interim decision, decided to inquire whether there are documents such as a birth report from the Population Directorate regarding the detained child involved in the crime, Yousif K., and ruled for the continuation of his detention. The panel also ordered the viewing of camera footage related to the incident at the next hearing and adjourned the trial.

After the hearing, İbrahim Ethem Abikoğlu, the lawyer of the Oktugan family, stated, "The trial will continue in the upcoming process, and witnesses will be heard in the next session. We have requests for a report to be obtained regarding the defendant who committed the act, especially concerning the determination of bone age. Therefore, we have an assertion that he is over 18 years old. We requested his referral to the Forensic Medicine Institution regarding this. After the court conducts research on this matter, an interim decision will be made, and eyewitnesses of the incident will be heard. Besides this, we lost a very valuable statesman. He left behind a grieving wife, a child, and a young man. Their only expectation from this point on is justice. At this stage, our trust in justice is infinite."

In the indictment prepared by the Istanbul Chief Public Prosecutor's Office, it was requested that Yousif K. be sentenced to imprisonment for a term of 19 to 27 years for the crimes of "premeditated murder due to the performance of a public duty" and "possession of an unlicensed firearm." It was also requested that the two children involved in the crime, A.S. and A.A., be sentenced to 15 to 20 years in prison for the crime of "aiding in premeditated murder due to the performance of a public duty." In the indictment prepared with a request for consolidation, it was requested that Muhammed Günay G. be sentenced to 15 to 20 years in prison for the crime of "aiding in premeditated murder due to the performance of a public duty."

== See also ==
- Murder of Özgecan Aslan
- 2026 Onikişubat school shooting
- Belgrade school shooting similar public reaction to the incident
