= Onikişubat =

- District and municipality
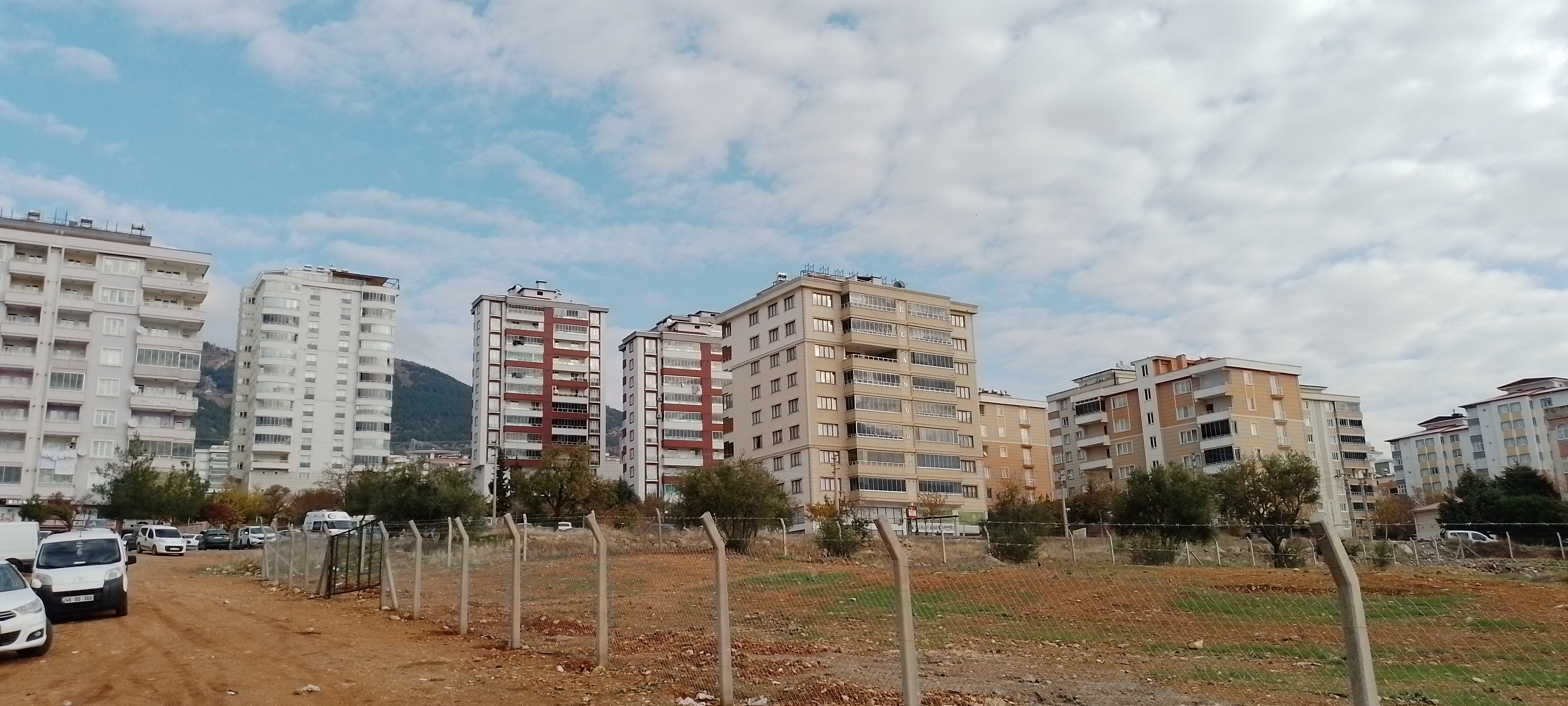

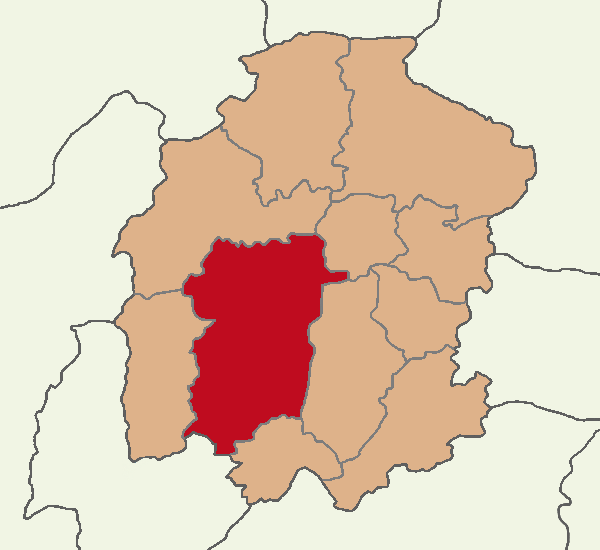
- Map showing Onikişubat District in Kahramanmaraş Province

- Location within Turkey
- Coordinates: 37°34′40″N 36°55′25″E
- Country: Turkey
- Province: Kahramanmaraş
- Area: 2,429 km^{2} (938 sq mi)
- Population (2022): 453,730
  - Density: 186.8/km^{2} (483.8/sq mi)
- Time zone: UTC+3 (TRT)
- Area code: 0344
- Website: www.onikisubat.bel.tr

Onikişubat is a municipality and district of Kahramanmaraş Province, Turkey. Its area is 2,429 km^{2}, and its population is 453,730 (2022). The district Onikişubat was created at the 2013 reorganisation from part of the former central district of Kahramanmaraş, along with the new district Dulkadiroğlu. It covers the western part of the agglomeration of Kahramanmaraş and the adjacent countryside. The name Kahramanmaraş is reserved for the metropolitan municipality.

"Onikişubat" means "12 February"; it refers to the date of recovery of Kahramanmaraş during the Turkish War of Independence in 1920.

== History ==
It was created as a result of the division of the central district of Kahramanmaraş into two by the law number 6360 adopted by the Grand National Assembly of Turkey on 12 November 2012.

=== 2026 shooting ===
On 15 April 2026, a school shooting occurred at the Ayser Çalık Secondary School in the Onikişubat district of Kahramanmaraş Province, Turkey. İsa Aras Mersinli, a 13-year-old (Note: Described as 14 years old in the majority of sources) student enrolled at the school, shot and killed 12 people and injured 13 more. Mersinli died from hypovolemic shock after sustaining a fatal knife injury while attempting to flee the scene.

The shooting occurred the day after a school shooting in the Siverek district of Şanlıurfa Province. It is the deadliest school shooting in the history of Turkey.

== Composition ==
There are 141 neighbourhoods in Onikişubat District:

- 5 Nisan
- Abdülhamidhan
- Afşar
- Ağcalı
- Akçakoyunlu
- Akif Inan
- Altınova
- Avcılar
- Avgasır
- Ayşepınarı
- Barbaros
- Beşbağlar
- Beşen
- Binevler
- Boğaziçi
- Bulutoğlu
- Büyüksır
- Çağırgan
- Çağlayan
- Çakırdere
- Çakırlar
- Çamlıbel
- Çamlıca
- Çamlık
- Celilli
- Çevrepınar
- Ceyhan
- Çokran
- Cüceli
- Çukurhisar
- Cumhuriyet
- Dadağlı
- Demrek
- Dereboğazı
- Döngel
- Döngele
- Dönüklü
- Dumlupınar
- Ertuğrul Gazi
- Fatih
- Fatmalı
- Gayberli
- Gedemen
- Gölpınar
- Hacıağlar
- Hacıbayramveli
- Hacıbudak
- Hacıibrahimuşağı
- Hacılar
- Hacımustafa
- Hacınınoğlu
- Hartlap
- Hasancıklı
- Haydarbey
- Hayrullah
- Hürriyet
- Ilıca
- İsmailli
- İstiklal
- Kale
- Kalekaya
- Kapıkaya
- Karacaoğlan
- Karadere
- Karamanlı
- Kavlaklı
- Kaynar
- Kazım Karabekir
- Kerimli
- Kertmen
- Kılavuzlu
- Kısıklı
- Kızıldamlar
- Kızılseki
- Köseli
- Köşürge
- Kozcağız
- Küçüksır
- Kumarlı
- Kumaşır
- Kümperli
- Kurtlar
- Kürtül
- Kurucaova
- Maarif
- Mağralı
- Maksutlu
- Malik Ejder
- Mercimektepe
- Mevlana
- Mimar Sinan
- Molla Gürani
- Muratlı
- Necip Fazıl
- Önsen
- Orhangazi
- Oruç Reis
- Öşlü
- Osman Gazi
- Özdenören
- Öztürk
- Payamlı
- Piri Reis
- Rahmacılar
- Reyhanlı
- Saçaklızade
- Sadıklı
- Şahinkayası
- Sarıçukur
- Sarıgüzel
- Sarımollalı
- Saygılı
- Şazibey
- Şehit Abdullah Çavuş
- Şehitevliya
- Selçuklu
- Selimiye
- Serintepe
- Suçatı
- Süleymanlı
- Süleymanşah
- Suluyayla
- Tavşantepe
- Tekerek
- Tekir
- Topçalı
- Uludaz
- Üngüt
- Vadi
- Yamaçtepe
- Yavşanova
- Yenicekale
- Yenidemir
- Yeniyapan
- Yeşilyurt
- Yirmiikigün
- Yolyanı
- Yunusemre
- Yürükselim
- Yusuflar
- Zeytindere
