= 2026 Bahçeşehir school attack =

School attack in Istanbul, Turkey

2026 Başakşehir School Stabbing
- Location: Istanbul, Turkey
- Date: 6 October 2026; 8:40 a.m. (UTC+3:00)
- Target: Students
- Attack type: Mass stabbing
- Weapon: Two knives
- Deaths: 1
- Injuries: 7
- No. of participants: 1
- Motive: Unknown

On 6 October 2026, a mass stabbing occurred at the Şeyh Şamil Imam Hatip Middle School in Istanbul, Turkey. A 15-year-old girl armed with two knives attacked students entering the school, killing one student and injuring seven others.

== Attack ==
The attack occurred at Şeyh Şamil Imam Hatip Middle School at approximately 8:40 a.m. (UTC+3:00) on 6 October 2026. As students were entering the school through the front gate, a 15-year-old student from another school attacked them with two knives while wearing her school uniform. School security personnel detained the student and handed them over to police. Their mother was also arrested.

== Victims ==
According to a statement by the Governor of Istanbul, one student died in hospital due to her injuries, with seven other students still undergoing treatment.

== Reactions ==
Davud Gül, Govenor of Istanbul, made a statement in Başakşehir Çam and Sakura Hospital, wished a speedy recovery to the injured. He also announced that 5 of 7 injured will be released in the same day, while 2 needing further treatment although they do not have any life-threatening injury.

Turkey's Radio and Television Supreme Council announced that a publication ban had been imposed on coverage of the attack, following a decision by the Istanbul 3rd Criminal Judgeship of Peace. The decision prohibited news reports, interviews and critical coverage of the incident in print, broadcast and visual media, internet media and social media until the investigation was completed. RTÜK said the ban was intended to prevent interference with the investigation.

== See also ==
- 2026 Poland school stabbings, a series of school attacks that occurred a few days after in Poland
