= 2026 Istanbul school stabbing =

Stabbing in Turkey

- Location: Borsa İstanbul Vocational and Technical Anatolian High School, Çekmeköy, Istanbul, Turkey
- Date: 2 March 2026
- Attack type: School stabbing
- Weapon: Knife
- Deaths: 1
- Injuries: 2
- Perpetrators: 17-year-old student (F.S.B.)
- Motive: Under investigation

The Çekmeköy school stabbing occurred on 2 March 2026 at a vocational high school in the Çekmeköy district of Istanbul, Turkey. A 17-year-old student carried out a stabbing attack inside the school, killing one teacher and injuring another teacher and a student before being detained at the scene by police.

== Attack ==
On 2 March 2026, a stabbing incident occurred at the Borsa Istanbul Vocational and Technical Anatolian High School in Çekmeköy, Istanbul, Turkey. A 17-year-old student attacked two teachers and one student inside the school with a knife during school hours.

The injured were taken to nearby hospitals, with one teacher arriving to the hospital in critical condition, and dying at the hospital. The suspect was apprehended at the scene by responding security forces.

=== Perpetrator ===
The perpetrator was identified as a 17-year-old male student of the vocational school in Çekmeköy. According to early reports, he had previously been flagged for behavioral concerns within the school system. Authorities reported that he was taken into custody immediately after the incident and transferred to law enforcement for questioning.

== Aftermath ==
Legal proceedings were initiated by Turkish authorities following the arrest of the suspect. Education unions across Turkey went on a one-day strike on 3 March 2026, the day after the incident, in response to the killing.
