= Eskişehir Osmangazi University =

Public university in Eskişehir, Turkey

- Eskişehir Osmangazi Üniversitesi
- Other name: ESOGU
- Motto: In the light of science, In the way of modern civilization...
- Type: Public
- Established: 18 August 1993
- Rector: Prof. Dr. Kamil Çolak
- Administrative staff: 1,507
- Students: 29,822
- Postgraduates: 5077
- Location: Eskişehir, Turkey; 39°45′00″N 30°28′44″E
- Website: en.ogu.edu.tr

Eskisehir Osmangazi University (Turkish: Eskişehir Osmangazi Üniversitesi), abbreviated as ESOGU, is located in Eskişehir, in the Eskişehir Province of Turkey.

== History ==
Eskişehir Osmangazi University (ESOGU) is a state university that dates back to the foundation of the Faculty of Medicine, the Faculty of Engineering and Architecture and the Faculty of Letters and Applied Sciences in 1970. Eskişehir Osmangazi University was founded with the transfer of various educational units of Anadolu University in 1993. These three faculties together with Eskişehir School of Health, Eskişehir Vocational School of Health Services, Institutes of Health Sciences, Metallurgy, and Applied Sciences, newly founded Faculty of Economic and Administrative Sciences and Institute of Social Sciences, have formed Eskişehir Osmangazi University on 18 August 1993. The university has added many new faculties and colleges over the years. Some colleges were converted into faculties in 2013 and 2016.

=== 2018 shooting ===
On April 5, 2018, 37-year-old research assistant Volkan Bayar, who was investigated by the university for verbally assaulting multiple faculty members, opened fire at the institution during an administrative meeting regarding his investigation, killing three academics and a secretary along with injuring three others. He then attempted fleeing the area before being arrested. In 2020, he received four life sentences along with his wife (also a research assistant), who was accused of instigating the attack.

== Affiliations ==
The university is a member of the Caucasus University Association.
