= 2026 Siverek school shooting =

Mass shooting in Şanlıurfa Province, Turkey

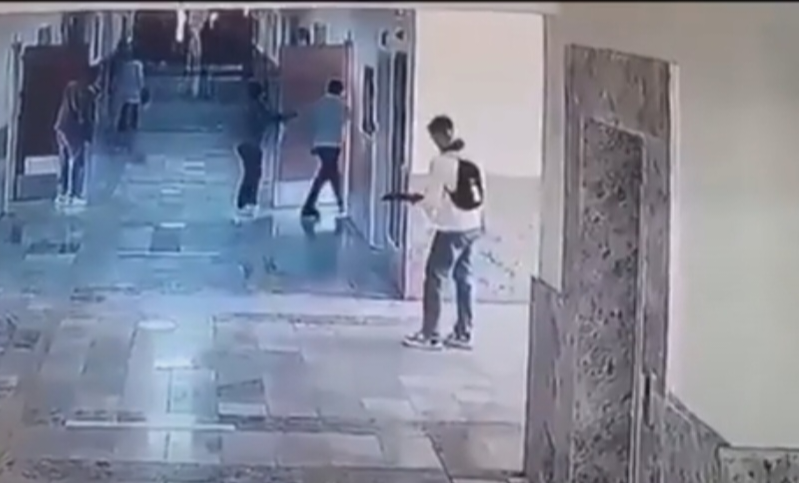
- The perpetrator loading his shotgun
- Location: 37°45′12″N 39°19′33″E; Siverek, Şanlıurfa Province, Turkey
- Date: 14 April 2026 c.9:30 a.m. (TRT; UTC+3:00)
- Target: Students, teachers, and other staff at the Ahmet Koyuncu Vocational and Technical Anatolian High School
- Attack type: School shooting, mass shooting, attempted murder-suicide
- Weapon: Pump-action shotgun
- Deaths: 1 (the perpetrator)
- Injuries: 16
- Perpetrator: Ömer Ket
- Motive: Under investigation

On 14 April 2026, a school shooting occurred at the Ahmet Koyuncu Vocational and Technical Anatolian High School in Siverek, Şanlıurfa Province, Turkey. Sixteen people were injured before the perpetrator, 19-year-old Ömer Ket, committed suicide. Twenty-eight hours after the shooting, another school shooting occurred in the Onikişubat district of Kahramanmaraş.

== Background ==
Turkey's gun laws require licensing, registration, mental and criminal background checks, and severe penalties for illegal possession. Although these laws are strict, the number of illegal guns is estimated to have increased to 25 million, perhaps ten times the legal number.

School shootings are rare in Turkey, although there are occasional knife attacks. In May 2024, a former student killed the principal of a private high school in Istanbul with a firearm five months after being expelled. He fled after the shooting and was arrested later. The killing triggered a nationwide debate while thousands of teachers demonstrated in Istanbul, calling for increased school safety measures.

In March 2026, a biology teacher, Fatma Nur Çelik, was stabbed to death by a 17-year-old student, while another teacher and a student were injured. Çelik had previously raised concerns about the student who would later kill her, he had disciplinary issues, and Çelik told colleagues, "we have no personal safety."

Prior to the shooting in Onikişubat, the deadliest school shooting in modern Turkish history was the 2018 Eskişehir University shooting, in which 37-year-old research assistant Volkan Bayar shot and killed four staff members and injured three other people at Eskişehir Osmangazi University.

== Shooting ==
Ket arrived at the school with a shotgun and opened fire outside the building at around 9:30 a.m. local time before hiding inside. CCTV footage showed Ket walking through a corridor while firing at people. An injured student told state broadcaster TRT that the gunman entered at least two classrooms, including the one he was in. During the shooting, some students jumped out of a window. Ket was cornered by police and killed himself with a self-inflicted gunshot.

== Victims ==
Ten students, four teachers, a cafeteria employee and a police officer were injured in the shooting. Eleven victims were treated in Siverek, while the other five were transported to a hospital in Şanlıurfa with more serious injuries.

== Perpetrator ==
Ket in an undated photograph

The perpetrator was identified as 19-year-old Ömer Ket, a former student who had attended the school for one year. He had previously been expelled in ninth grade for absenteeism and academic failure, but he continued his education through distance learning. Although he did not have a criminal record, it was reported that Ket had booked an appointment a month ago to be admitted to a psychiatric hospital, and it was noted that he had antisocial personality disorder. The motive for the shooting is unknown and remains under investigation. Days before the attack, Ket wrote "There's going to be an attack at this school in a few days—get ready, beavers" in the comments section of a post on the school's social media account. He also posted an image of Eric Harris and Dylan Klebold on Facebook.

After the Forensic Medicine Institute released his body to his family, Ket was buried in Urfa under heavy police guard. His family was placed under state protection and transported from Siverek.

== Aftermath ==
A day after the attack, a 13-year-old opened fire at a middle school in Onikişubat, Kahramanmaras, killing 12 people and injuring 12 others before getting stabbed to death, making it the deadliest school shooting in Turkish history. On the same day, a teenager opened fire at a student outside of a high school in Gaziantep. Five shots were fired, but nobody was injured. A high school student in Tarsus, Mersin, was also taken into custody after being caught with a handgun at school.

== See also ==
- List of school attacks in Turkey
