= 2026 Onikişubat school shooting =

2026 mass shooting in Kahramanmaraş Province, Turkey

- Students jumping from windows to escape the shooting
- Location: 37.5868°N 36.8662°E; Onikişubat, Kahramanmaraş Province, Turkey
- Date: 15 April 2026 c.13:30 (TRT; UTC+03:00)
- Attack type: School shooting, mass shooting, mass murder, child murder
- Weapons: Perpetrator: Five 9mm semi-automatic pistols: Sarsılmaz SAR9; Sarsılmaz SAR9 CX; CZ 75B; Atmaca 53; Ruger P85; Defender: Kitchen knife
- Deaths: 13 (including the perpetrator)
- Injuries: 15 (13 by gunfire)
- Perpetrator: İsa Aras Mersinli
- Defenders: Necmettin Bekçi, and two teachers
- Motive: Under investigation

On 15 April 2026, a school shooting occurred at the Ayser Çalık Secondary School in the Onikişubat district of Kahramanmaraş Province, Turkey. İsa Aras Mersinli, a 13-year-old (Note: Described as 14 years old in the majority of sources) student enrolled at the school, shot and killed 12 people and injured 13 more. Mersinli died from hypovolemic shock after sustaining a fatal knife injury inflicted by a parent on the school stairs while attempting to flee the scene.

The shooting occurred the day after a school shooting in the Siverek district of Şanlıurfa Province. It is the deadliest school shooting in the history of Turkey.

At the time, İsa Aras Mersinli was undergoing treatment for psychiatric issues, having a history of self-harm (such as stabbing their palm with a pen, cutting their hand with a knife, and slitting their own throat), as well as aggressive behavior towards other people at the school. In spite of this, their father, Uğur Mersinli, a police officer, had reportedly taken his child to a police shooting range to teach them how to use firearms two days prior to the shooting. He later claimed that they were locked in a safe, which was disproven by a video showing his child loading a magazine and several photos of their posing with a gun. The deputy headteacher, who checked Mersinli's schoolbag every day and closely monitored their mental state, had been relieved of their duties a month before the massacre. It was reported that the attacker had managed to smuggle the weapons into the school by concealing them inside an art project.

== Background ==
School shootings are uncommon in Turkey. The nation has gun laws that require licensing, registration, psychiatric evaluations, criminal background checks, and severe penalties for illegal possession. Although some say these laws are strict, others say that the number of individual gun owners has increased dangerously. Prior to the Onikişubat shooting, the most notable school shooting was the 2018 Eskişehir University shooting. Following the Siverek attack, many teachers' unions in Turkey announced a nationwide one-day work stoppage for 15 April to protest the lack of security for educators and students.

Minutes before the shooting, Minister of National Education Yusuf Tekin addressed the press ahead of the AK Party's Grand National Assembly (TBMM) group meeting. Regarding the Siverek shooting, he stated that, based on assessments conducted with the Ministry of the Interior, schools have been classified by risk category and that such safety issues remain a priority on his agenda.

=== Other attacks in Turkey ===
The day prior, a 19-year-old man opened fire at a vocational high school in Siverek, Şanlıurfa Province, injuring 16 people before committing suicide. On the same day as the Onikişubat shooting, a teenager opened fire at a student outside a high school in Şahinbey, Gaziantep Province. Five shots were fired but nobody was injured. A high school student in Tarsus, Mersin Province, was also taken into custody after being caught with a handgun at school. A 14-year-old boy was severely injured in a stabbing at a park in Keçiören, Ankara Province. On 17 April 2026, a parent of a student at the Dumlupınar Secondary School in Şanlıurfa attempted to attack a teacher with a knife. Police officers at the school subdued the attacker, and no one was injured in the incident.

== Shooting ==
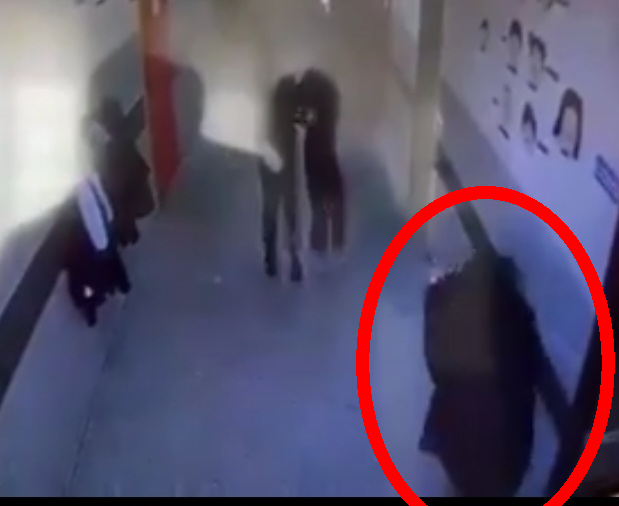
Mersinli (circled in red) aiming at two students before shooting them.

According to preliminary reports from the Kahramanmaraş Governor's Office and local law enforcement, the shooting began at approximately 13:30 TRT. The shooter reportedly concealed five 9mm pistols and seven magazines in a backpack before entering the school. The shooting started after the perpetrator entered a classroom and opened fire on the occupants. Following this, they moved to a second classroom where they continued the attack. At least one of the attacked classrooms was a mathematics class. As the shooting occurred, students reportedly jumped out of the school windows in order to escape.

Necmettin Bekçi, a parent of two students at the school, eventually entered the building to attempt to stop the attack. He claimed that two members of staff at the school were already attempting to hold the perpetrator down in a stairwell when they arrived. Bekçi explained that, after the perpetrator broke free, he slashed the leg of the perpetrator with a knife in order to incapacitate them, inadvertently severing their femoral artery. An autopsy report showed that hypovolemic shock resulted in Mersinli's death.

=== Immediate aftermath ===
Shortly after the first reports, emergency medical teams were immediately sent to help the injured and take them to nearby hospitals. Schools in Kahramanmaraş were closed for two days following the incident. Interior Minister Mustafa Çiftçi, National Education Minister Tekin, and Minister of Health Kemal Memişoğlu declared his intention to travel to Kahramanmaraş to manage the response efforts and assist families. The Ministry of Justice announced a broadcast ban on covering the shooting for "the sake of the integrity of the investigation". Seven prosecutors, four chief civil inspectors and four chief police inspectors have been assigned to the ongoing investigation.

== Victims ==
One teacher and eleven students were killed, including one who later died after being treated for 18 days at a hospital. 13 were injured at the school, and seven more were injured while trying to escape, including five critically. Eleven people were discharged from hospital after receiving treatment.

Ayla Kara, 56, a mathematics teacher, was hailed as a hero by shielding her students with her body when the shooting began. She was struck by bullets and died at the scene.

One of the victims of the shooting was 11-year-old Yusuf Tarık Gül, who later died from his injuries. His father was a police officer who was sacked during the post-2016 Turkish coup attempt purges in Turkey and spent six years in prison. Only six months after they were reunited following his father’s release from prison, Yusuf was killed. No government officials from the ruling Justice and Development Party (AKP) attended Yusuf’s funeral, reportedly due to his father’s background. This prompted criticism from human rights groups and MPs Ömer Faruk Gergerlioğlu and Turan Çömez. On 4 May, another female student, Almina Ağaoğlu, died in the hospital from her injuries.

All of the following were killed in the shooting (excluding the perpetrator):

- Ayla Kara, female, 55 (teacher)
- Şuranur Sevgi Kazıcı, female, 11 (student)
- Belinay Nur Boyraz, female, 11 (student)
- Kerem Erdem Güngör, male, 11 (student)
- Furkan Sancak Balal, male, 11 (student)
- Yusuf Tarık Gül, male, 11 (student)
- Bayram Nabi Şişik, male, 11 (student)
- Yılmaz Efe Konar, male, 11 (student)
- Zeynep Kılıç, female, 11 (student)
- Kağan Güngör, male (student)
- Adnan Göktürk Yeşil, male, 11 (student)
- Almina Ağaoğlu, female, 11 (student)

== Perpetrator ==
The perpetrator was identified as 13-year-old İsa Aras Mersinli (13 August 2012 – 15 April 2026) who was an 8th-grade student at the school. They reportedly entered the school with weapons belonging to his father, a police officer serving as 1st Degree Police Chief, which they had concealed in a backpack. Mersinli's motive for the attack is under investigation. Terrorism was initially suspected but has since been ruled out. State-run broadcaster TRT reported that the perpetrator's parents had been detained for questioning following the attack, though the mother was later released. Reports indicated that the perpetrator's WhatsApp profile picture featured American mass murderer Elliot Rodger. However, other reports mentioned that Mersinli identified as Non-Binary online and liked to wear clothes on camera.

According to the testimony provided by the perpetrator's father, Uğur Mersinli, his child had been struggling with psychological issues and was receiving treatment from a psychiatrist. The father stated that the firearms were kept in a locked chest and he was unsure how his child had accessed them; he added that just two days before the shooting, he had taken his child to a police shooting range to teach them how to use the firearms. The claim that the father had locked the guns in a Maraş chest was reportedly disproven by a video showing the perpetrator loading a magazine and several photos of them posing with a gun.

In a written statement issued by the Kahramanmaraş Chief Public Prosecutor’s Office, it was stated that all information and documents regarding the perpetrator’s state of health had been obtained from the relevant healthcare institutions. Investigations revealed that two different institutions' psychologists had indicated that the perpetrator required child psychiatric support prior to the shooting, but that his parents had failed to take these recommendations into account.

A student claimed that Mersinli had no friends in school, often slept during lessons and behaved strangely in class; alleging that he had told his classmates a few days before the attack that he intended to carry out an armed assault on the school but that those around them did not take these statements seriously and dismissed them as a joke. She also stated that Mersinli harmed themself with sharp or piercing objects such as pens, and that during quiet moments in the classroom, they experienced sudden crying fits for no apparent reason which frequently required the intervention of the school counselling service.

Additionally, the parent of a student at the same school claimed that the attacker had cut themself with a razor blade at a maternity hospital a month ago, and that this had not been recorded on their criminal record because their father was a member of the police force. Furthermore, Hülya Çevik, head of the school's parent-teacher organization, stated that Mersinli was a troubled child, also noting that they had previously stabbed them palm with a pen, cut his hand with a knife, slit his own throat, and frequently exhibited aggressive behavior. Çevik also reported that the deputy headteacher, who checked Mersinli's schoolbag every day and closely monitored his mental state, had been relieved of his duties a month before the incident.

It was reported that the attacker had smuggled the weapons into the school by concealing them inside an art project.

=== Online activity ===
It was reported that Mersinli had actively used Discord under the nicknames "Konata Herself" and "Konata Themself", and that his last message on the app was a partial screenshot of a manifesto, in which he explained his plan and intentions in a Discord direct message. The factual integrity of this was supported by Mersinli's online partner and online friends. In one message Mersinli sent, he claimed that his father tried to strangle him to death.

Mersinli's online partner from Argentina admitted that Mersinli had made repeated threats to carry out the shooting in Discord chats, but she dismissed them as jokes. Their girlfriend also stated that she and Mersinli were in a polyamorous relationship with an individual named Victor, and that Mersinli was Victor's girlfriend.

In one instance, Mersinli stated in TikTok direct messages that he had access to firearms and was undergoing gun safety training, referencing his ability to use weapons owned by a family member. The message did not contain a direct threat but contributed to concerns about how potentially alarming statements may be communicated in private online spaces.

The perpetrator had played a Columbine Massacre Roblox game before the event.

=== Manifesto ===
A two-page excerpt of Mersinli's manifesto was made public by their online partner on X. In the document, he wrote about living a life of constant loneliness and isolation from society. Despite being considerably wealthy and wanting to connect with others, he admitted that he often found themself alone. Mersinli openly stated that he had only two friends who later abandoned them, and was disappointed in them. Mersinli dismissed social isolation as the primary reason for their actions, instead attributing his behavior to their self-proclaimed status as a "genius". They cited a claimed IQ of 130 as evidence of his intellectual standing. The manifesto contains criticisms of the formal education system, which Mersinli asserts was "not suited to him", leading them to become an autodidact; they highlighted his self-taught proficiency in English as a primary example of this "genius".

=== Death ===
The initial reports suggested that Mersinli had committed suicide at the scene. The autopsy report, however, showed the actual cause of death was blood loss resulting from stab wounds to the leg. This was the result of the father of two students, Necmettin Bekçi, hearing the shooting and attacking Mersinli with a knife from the school canteen. Bekçi was interviewed by authorities following the shooting. In his testimony, Bekçi stated that his actions were intended to prevent Mersinli from causing further harm. He testified that he did not bring a weapon to the school but that he had retrieved a knife from the school canteen. Bekçi was released following his testimony.

According to the report, Mersinli’s height was around 1.79 meters and their weight was between 85 to 90 kilograms. The lividity was slight at the back and non-pressure areas. Mersinli was wearing protective nylon bags on his hands and four pads for electrodes at their back. No lesions could be noticed on their back, palms, armpits, and skin folds. A 2.5 centimeters incised wound, caused by a kitchen knife, was identified on the posterior aspect of the right hind limb. Following the post-mortem examination, Mersinli was buried in Osmaniye Province. The burial service was met with a mass of protestors, resulting in armoured police vehicles being called to protect the service.

== Aftermath ==
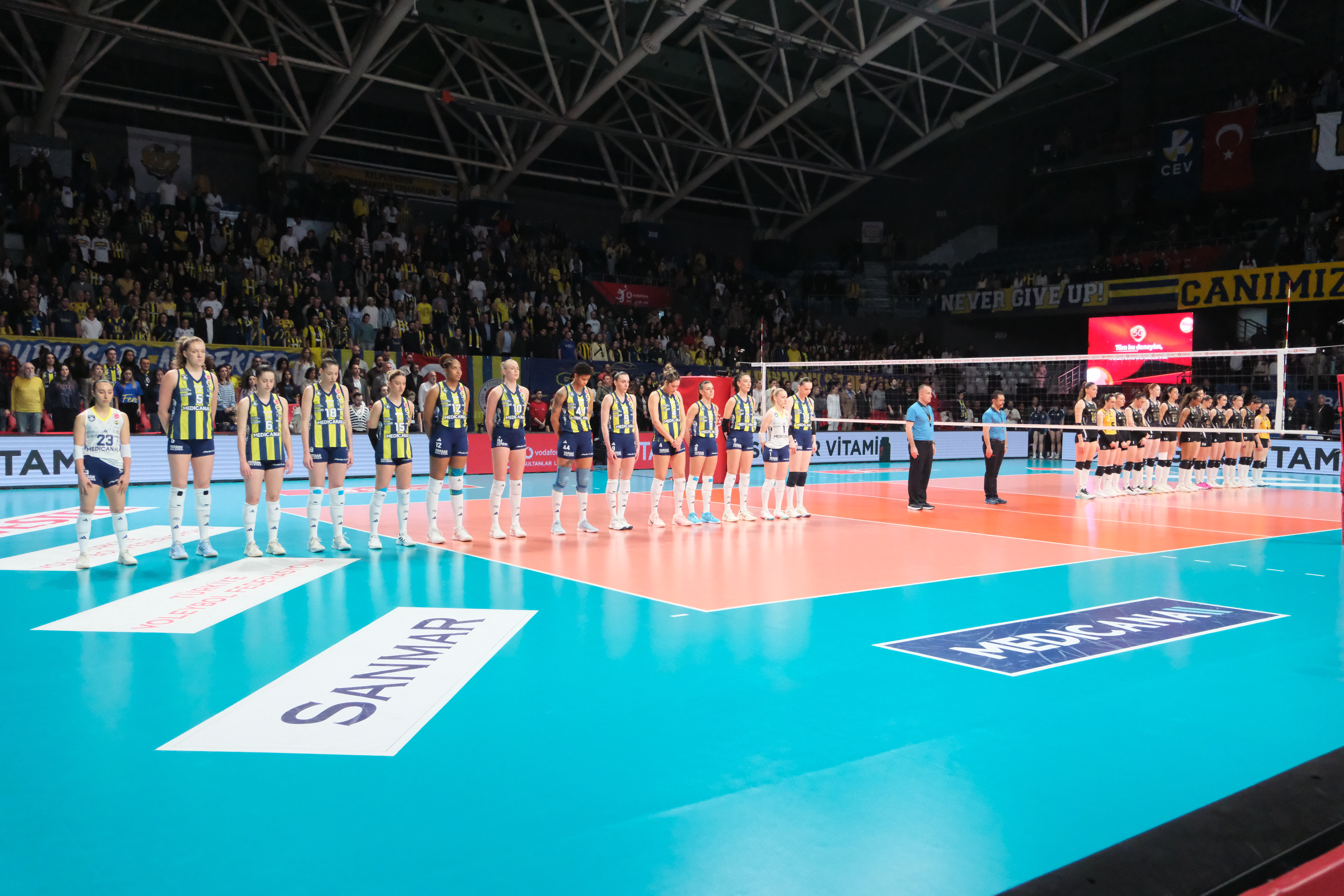
A moment of silence was held during sporting events held over the weekend in which the shooting took place

Legal proceedings were filed against accounts identified as having shared uncensored footage of the attack via Telegram. Simultaneously, the Department of Counter Cyber Crimes, operating under the General Directorate of Security (EGM), announced proceedings against 591 social media accounts and the arrest of 411 individuals accused of spreading disinformation, distorting events, and posting provocative content. In addition, detention orders were issued against 83 individuals found to have glorified the perpetrator; access to 940 social media accounts and 1,866 URLs were blocked, and 111 Telegram groups were shut down. A total of 174 individuals who posted misleading content and made threats or called for action have been identified; 127 of them have been apprehended.

A Telegram group with approximately 100,000 members named "C31K", which had previously been known to law enforcement for the murders of Ayşenur Halil and İkbal Uzuner, praised the attackers and disseminated fictitious dates and locations for new attacks designed to incite widespread public panic. The Telegram group was shut down on 16 April 2026, and one of its founders was arrested the following day. Following these events, Telegram was called to give a statement to the Grand National Assembly of Turkey. Meanwhile, law enforcement arrested many individuals who used deceptive posts to create widespread public panic. Most notably, the Sivas Governor's Office reported that E.A., a year 10 student born in 2009, was arrested at his residence after being identified as having posted claims that local schools were at risk of attack.

On 16 April 2026 at 15:30, the EGM announced that the perpetrator's father, Uğur Mersinli, was taken into custody. He was subsequently arrested and transferred to Elazığ Prison. The father is facing potential charges of gross negligence and failing to secure firearms. A detention order was issued for Salih Gergerlioğlu, the son of DEM Party MP Ömer Faruk Gergerlioğlu, who allegedly made posts on social media intended to spread fear and panic following the shooting and publicly disseminated misleading information to the public. Ayser Çalık Secondary School, the site of the shooting, was temporarily closed on 17 April 2026. It was announced that the students would continue their education at another school.

On the same day, a high school student who shared a photo of a bomb and messages containing threats to carry out a bombing in Istanbul was arrested. A bulletproof vest, camouflage gear, a helmet, a knife, and pepper spray were seized from the individual's home. An investigation was launched into the "Minecraft Parodileri" YouTube channel, which has over 7.5 million subscribers, on allegations that it was one of the factors that incited the Mersinli to perpetrate the shooting. Furthermore, access to the channel was blocked in Turkey.

An eighth-grade student in Bolu Province, identified as A.A., was detained by the Gendarmerie General Command following allegations that he threatened an attack on his school. During questioning, the student reportedly stated that the threats were made as a joke. Eight students suspected of planning an attack at a school in Torbalı, İzmir Province, were taken into custody. It was determined that the individuals had planned the attack in a WhatsApp group they had created among themselves. Justice Minister Akın Gürlek announced that new regulations will be introduced in Law No. 6136 regarding the storage of firearms, including plans to expand parental responsibility and increase penalties for serious violent crimes involving children.

Security measures at schools nationwide have been strengthened. As part of the new protocols, police have been stationed outside of schools, with additional teams on standby during school hours and a minimum of two officers assigned to each school. Additionally, some schools have banned cell phones, smartwatches, and tablets, and stricter entry controls have been implemented, including identity checks and parent appointment requirements.

Mahinur Özdemir Göktaş, Minister of Family and Social Services, stated that a six-month action plan had been drawn up for schools following the shooting. Göktaş also announced that a dedicated team had been established for each school.

On 19 April 2026, the Ministry of National Education (MEB) announced that Erhan Baydur, who served as the Kahramanmaraş Provincial Director of National Education, was removed from his position.

On 21 April 2026, a motion for a parliamentary committee to investigate, the shootings that occurred in Şanlıurfa and Kahramanmaraş, as well as the risks and adverse effects children face in digital environments, was approved by the TBMM. On the same day, Justice Minister Gürlek announced that the perpetrator's mother, Pınar Peyman Mersinli was arrested.

On 23 April 2026, a bill amending the Social Services Law and certain other laws, which includes provisions relating to social media and maternity leave, was passed by the TBMM and became law. Under the law, social media providers will be prohibited from providing services to children under the age of 15 and will be required to take necessary measures, including age verification, to ensure that such services are not provided.

=== Reactions ===
The teachers' unions Eğitim-İş and Eğitim-Sen announced a nationwide three-day strike on 15–17 April to draw attention to the rising levels of violence in schools. Footage of an attempt to silence a father whose son was killed in the shooting by covering his mouth after he protested against the governor sparked outrage on social media. Turkish President Recep Tayyip Erdoğan issued a statement of condolence through his official social media accounts. Republican People's Party (CHP) leader Özgür Özel expressed deep sorrow regarding the shooting, while party spokesperson Zeynel Emre proposed the deployment of 65,000 sergeant majors to serve as security personnel in schools across Turkey. Ahmet Davutoğlu, leader of the Future Party, suggested that 23 April, the National Sovereignty and Children's Day should not be celebrated in the wake of the attack. Davutoğlu stated, "They did not declare a national day of mourning, but I am declaring one. I will not attend any reception involving celebrations, laughter or merriment."

Some Turkish news outlets, most notably journalist Ahmet Hakan and professor Ali Murat Kırık, linked the attack — and similar attacks throughout the world — with the prevalence of violent videogames and the glorification of violence and anti-social behavior on social media. A significant amount of discussion within the aftermath of the shooting involved allegations regarding the Turkish media and its contribution to creating a culture of violence. State officials and critics mostly attributed the psychological desensitization of young people and the romanticization of gun use to the popularity of television shows with mafia themes.

Radio and Television Supreme Council (RTÜK) member İlhan Taşcı, stated that "although such incidents are too multifaceted to be reduced to a single cause, the influence of content on television and digital platforms must not be overlooked." Similarly, Nationalist Movement Party (MHP) leader Devlet Bahçeli claimed that digitalisation erodes national and cultural values and increases the risk of such incidents occurring. As a result of the backlash, the series Eşref Rüya and Yeraltı were removed from their weekly schedule. Producers of these and similar shows were ordered to revise their scripts accordingly. Eğitim-İş and Eğitim-Sen members protested against the lack of security in schools and demanded the resignation of Yusuf Tekin in front of the Ministry of National Education (MEB) building in Ankara Province.

== See also ==
- 2026 Siverek school shooting (the school shooting in Turkey the day prior)
- List of massacres in Turkey
- List of school attacks in Turkey
- Murder of Ibrahim Oktugan
