= 2025 in Turkey =

- Centuries: 20th; 21st
- Decades: 2000s; 2010s; 2020s; 2030s
- See also: List of years in Turkey

Individuals and events related to 2025 in Turkey.

== Incumbents ==
Office	Image	Name	Tenure / Current length
President		Recep Tayyip Erdoğan	28 August 2014 (11 years ago)
Vice President of Turkey		Cevdet Yılmaz	4 June 2023 (2 years ago)
30th Speaker of the Grand National Assembly		Numan Kurtulmuş	27 June 2023 (2 years ago)
President of the Constitutional Court		Zühtü Arslan	10 February 2015 (11 years ago)
Minister of National Defense		Yaşar Güler	4 June 2023 (2 years ago)
Chief of the Turkish General Staff		Metin Gürak	3 August 2023 (2 years ago)

== Events ==
=== Ongoing ===
- Kurdish–Turkish conflict (2015–present)
- Purges in Turkey (2016–present)
- 2025 Turkish protests

=== January ===
- 13 January – Riza Akpolat, the CHP mayor of Beşiktaş, Istanbul Province, is arrested as part of an investigation into alleged bid-rigging, bribery and unjust acquisition of property.
- 16 January – At least 30 people are reported to have died across Istanbul after consuming bootleg alcohol. By 17 February, the death toll reaches 124, with cases also reported in Ankara.
- 20 January – Ümit Özdağ, the leader of the Victory Party, is arrested on charges of insulting President Recep Tayyip Erdoğan and inciting violence on social media during the 2024 anti-refugee riots in Turkey.
- 21 January –
  - At least 78 people are killed in a fire at a hotel in Kartalkaya, Bolu Province.
  - Four people are injured in a gas explosion at a ski resort in Sivas Province.
- 25 January – Two people are killed in the collapse of an apartment building in Konya.
- 28 January – Serhan Asker, the chief editor of Halk TV, is detained along with two other journalists after the station airs a phone conversation with a court-appointed expert accused of bias against mayors belonging to the CHP.
- 29 January – Sofya Alagas, the DEM mayor of Siirt, is removed from her position after a conviction for terrorism offenses connected with accusations of her supporting the PKK.
- 31 January – Five alumni of the Turkish Military Academy are dismissed along with three other officers from the Turkish Armed Forces for reciting an unauthorized secularist oath at their graduation ceremony in 2024.

=== February ===
- 6 February – Turkey withdraws its accreditation of Afghan diplomats representing the pre-2021 government.
- 11 February – Ten CHP district municipal officials from Kartal and Ataşehir in Istanbul Province are arrested on suspicion of links to the PKK.
- 13–18 February – Around 282 people are arrested in nationwide raids in 51 cities on suspicion of having links with the PKK.
- 19 February – An inflatable dinghy carrying migrants sinks off the coast of Selçuk, killing at least six people.
- 27 February – PKK leader Abdullah Öcalan issues a message from prison calling for the group to hold a congress dissolving itself and laying down its weapons.

=== March ===
- 1 March – The PKK declares a ceasefire following Abdullah Öcalan's appeal on 27 February.
- 19 March – The CHP mayor of Istanbul, Ekrem İmamoğlu, is arrested on charges of corruption and terrorism, sparking nationwide protests.
- 27 March – Two people, including Olympic skier Berkin Usta, are killed in a fire at the Kervansaray Hotel in Uludağ, Bursa Province.

=== April ===
- 2 April – Meta Platforms announces that the Turkish government has imposed a "substantial" fine on the company for refusing to limit content on Facebook and Instagram.
- 3 April – A boat carrying migrants sinks off the coast of Çanakkale Province, killing nine passengers.
- 8 April – At least 38 officers of the General Directorate of Customs Protection are arrested as part of an investigation into bribery at the Kapıkule border crossing with Bulgaria.
- 17 April – The Interior Ministry announces the arrest of 525 suspected drug dealers across Ankara in what is described as the country's "biggest narcotics operation".
- 21 to 27 April – 2025 IIHF World Championship Division III Group A
- 22 April – A minibus and a truck collide in Gürpınar, Van Province, killing eight people and injuring 11 others.
- 23 April – A magnitude 6.2 earthquake hits the Marmara Sea off the coast of Istanbul, injuring 236 people.
- 30 April – Swedish journalist Joakim Medin, who was arrested while covering the 2025 Turkish protests, is convicted and sentenced to a suspended 11-month prison term by a court in Ankara on charges of insulting President Erdoğan.

=== May ===
- 3 May – A magnitude 3.6 earthquake hits the Sea of Marmara, injuring one person in Istanbul Province.
- 7 May – The Constitutional Court of Turkey upholds the 2024 law allowing for the culling of stray dogs.
- 12 May – The PKK announces its dissolution and laying down of arms.
- 15 May – A magnitude 5.0 earthquake hits Konya Province, injuring 17 people.
- 16 May – The first direct peace negotiations since 2022 between Ukraine and Russia are held in Istanbul.
- 17 May – Joakim Medin is released and returned to Sweden following lobbying by the Swedish and other European foreign ministries.
- 23 May – Fifty-six people are arrested in nationwide raids on suspicion of involvement in the 2016 Turkish coup attempt.

=== June ===
- 2 June – A magnitude 5.8 earthquake hits Muğla Province, killing one person.
- 5 June – The CHP mayors of Avcılar, Büyükçekmece and Gaziosmanpaşa in Istanbul Province, along with the CHP mayors of Seyhan and Ceyhan in Adana Province, are suspended on corruption charges.
- 15 June – A hot-air balloon crashes near Gözlükuyu, Aksaray, killing the pilot and injuring 19 Indonesian passengers on board.
- 17 June – Ümit Özdağ, the leader of the Victory Party, is sentenced to two years' imprisonment and insulting President Erdoğan and inciting violence on social media during the 2024 anti-refugee riots in Turkey, but is ordered released by the same court due to time served in pre-trial detention.
- 28 June – At least 54 people are arrested during attempts by police to prevent the celebration of Istanbul Pride.
- 29 June – A wildfire breaks out in İzmir Province, leaving one person dead and prompting the evacuation of 50,000 people.
- 30 June – The offices of the satirical magazine Leman is pelted with stones in Istanbul by demonstrators protesting against the publication of cartoons allegedly depicting the Prophet Muhammad.

=== July ===
- 1 July – The former mayor of İzmir, Tunç Soyer, is arrested as part of 120 officials in İzmir Province linked with the CHP on suspicion of corruption.
- 4 July – A wildfire breaks out in Dörtyol, Hatay Province, prompting the evacuation of 920 homes.
- 5 July – Three CHP mayors (Abdurrahman Tutdere of Adiyaman, Zeydan Karalar of Adana, and Muhittin Böcek of Antalya) are arrested on suspicion of corruption, bribery and other charges.
- 6 July –
  - A man is injured after being attack by a lion that had escaped from a zoo in Manavgat.
  - Twelve Turkish soldiers are killed by methane gas poisoning in a cave in northern Iraq while searching for the remains of a fellow soldier who was killed by the PKK during Operation Claw-Lock in 2022.
- 9 July –
  - A message from PKK leader Abdullah Öcalan is released in which he announces the end of the group's armed struggle against the Turkish state.
  - The government partially bans content from X's AI chatbot Grok amid a probe over insults to president Erdoğan and founder Mustafa Kemal Atatürk.
- 12 July –
  - A fire at an apartment building in Ankara kills three people, including a baby, and injures many others, with 20 people hospitalized.
  - The ancient city of Sardis and the Lydian Tumuli of Bin Tepe are designated as World Heritage Sites by UNESCO.
- 16 July – The CHP mayor of Istanbul, Ekrem İmamoğlu, is convicted of insulting and threatening Istanbul's Chief Public Prosecutor Akin Gurlek and sentenced to one year and eight months' imprisonment.
- 22 July – Ten forestry and emergency workers are killed in a wildfire in Seyitgazi, Eskişehir Province.
- 25 July –
  - The provinces of Bilecik and İzmir are designated as disaster areas due to wildfires.
  - The Environment Ministry records the highest temperature recorded in Turkey, at 50.5 °C (122.9 °F) in Silopi, Şırnak Province.
- 28 July – A water tanker overturns in Bursa, killing three firefighters responding to a wildfire in Ağlaşan.

=== August ===
- 2 August – A ceremony is held in Kilis to open the distribution of natural gas from Azerbaijan to Syria via Turkey.
- 9 August – Turkey welcomed the peace agreement signed between Armenia and Azerbaijan.
- 10 August – A magnitude 6.1 earthquake hits Balikesir Province, killing one person and injuring 29 others.
- 11 August – A firetruck responding to a wildfire falls into a ditch in Hasanbeyli, Osmaniye Province, killing a forestry worker.
- 15 August – İnan Güney, the CHP mayor of Beyoğlu, Istanbul Province, is arrested amid an investigation into alleged corruption.
- 18 August –
  - Four migrants are found dead after falling from a rubber dinghy off the coast of Karaburun, İzmir Province.
  - A bus overturns along the Otoyol 7 in Sancaktepe, Istanbul Province, killing four people.
- 19 August – A man is arrested after setting his car on fire in front of the Grand National Assembly building in Ankara in protest against vehicle taxation policies.
- 26 August – Transport minister Abdulkadir Uraloğlu is fined 9,267 Turkish Lira ($225) for posting a video of himself on social media overspeeding along a highway near Ankara.
- 27 August – Around 1,534 items of merchandise valued at 1.25 billion Turkish liras ($30.5 million) are seized by police during a raid at the Grand Bazaar in Istanbul as part of an investigation into diamond smuggling.
- 29 August – Turkey imposes a trade ban on Israel, closing its ports to Israeli ships and barring aircraft affiliated with government officials and arms shipments from its airspace.

=== September ===
- 2 September – A court annuls the CHP's 2023 Istanbul provincial congress that led to the election of Özgür Çelik as party provincial chair, citing procedural irregularities.
- 7 September – A magnitude 4.9 earthquake hits Balıkesir Province, destroying two houses in Sındırgı.
- 8 September – Two police officers are shot dead by a 16-year old gunman at a police station in Balçova, İzmir Province.
- 11 September – Around 121 companies belonging to Can Holding, including the private television broadcasters Habertürk TV and Show TV are seized by the state and placed under the control of the Savings Deposit Insurance Fund of Turkey as part of an investigation into fraud, tax evasion and money laundering.
- 12 September – Turkey–Islamic State conflict: Police announce the arrest of 161 suspected Islamic State members over the last week and seize unlicensed weapons and documents in raids in 38 provinces, including Istanbul and Ankara.
- 13 September – Hasan Mutlu, the CHP mayor of Bayrampaşa, Istanbul Province, is arrested along with 47 other municipal officials amid an investigation into alleged corruption.
- 14 September – Turkey finishes in second place at EuroBasket 2025 after losing to Germany 88-83 at the final in Latvia.
- 18 September – The historic Keyvanlar mansion in Mudurnu, Bolu Province, is destroyed in a fire.
- 21 September – Özgür Özel is reelected as leader of the CHP following a special congress.
- 23 September – Thirteen people are arrested as part of an investigation into alleged corruption over concerts organized by the Ankara municipal government.
- 26 September – Turkish Airlines announces an agreement with Boeing to purchase 225 of the latter's aircraft.
- 28 September – A magnitude 5.4 earthquake hits Kütahya Province, destroying eight houses in Simav District.

=== October ===
- 2 October – A magnitude 5.0 earthquake hits the Sea of Marmara, injuring 17 people in the Istanbul area.
- 24 October – A migrant boat sinks off the coast of Bodrum, Muğla Province, killing at least 14 people. Two survivors are rescued.
- 26 October – The PKK announce their withdrawal from Turkey as part of a disarmament process, following the earlier decision in May to disarm and disband.
- 27 October –
  - A magnitude 6.1 earthquake hits Balıkesir Province, destroying three buildings.
  - Turkey signs an agreement with the United Kingdom to purchase 20 Eurofighter Typhoon fighter aircraft.
- 29 October – Four people are killed in the collapse of an apartment building in Gebze.
- 31 October – Eleven people, including the hotel owner, are sentenced to life imprisonment over the 2025 Kartalkaya hotel fire in January.

=== November ===
- 7 November –
  - Turkey issues arrest warrants to 37 Israeli officials for crimes against humanity in the Gaza war, including Prime Minister Benjamin Netanyahu, Defence Minister Israel Katz, National Security Minister Itamar Ben-Gvir and IDF chief Lieutenant General Eyal Zamir.
  - A magnitude 3.9 earthquake hits Hatay Province, injuring one person in Defne.
- 8 November – Six people are killed in a fire at a perfume depot in Dilovası, Kocaeli Province.
- 11 November –
  - 2025 Turkish Air Force Lockheed C-130 crash: A Turkish Armed Forces C-130 Hercules cargo plane flying from Azerbaijan crashes in Signagi Municipality, Georgia, killing all 20 people on board.
  - 2025 Turkish football betting scandal: An Istanbul court issues arrest warrants for eight suspects involved in investigations into alleged illegal sports betting by Turkish Football Federation staff.
- 12 November — Four members of a Turkish-German family fall ill and subsequently die from suspected pesticide gas poisoning caused by phosphine at a hotel in Fatih, Istanbul.
- 26 November — Journalist Fatih Altaylı is sentenced to four years' imprisonment on charges of issuing and disseminating threats against President Erdoğan on his YouTube programme.
- 27 November —
  - Pope Leo XIV arrives in Ankara in the first overseas visit of his papacy.
  - A court in Istanbul acquits four photojournalists on charges of violating laws on demonstrations and public gatherings during the 2025 Turkish protests in March.
- 28 November —
  - A ecumenical meeting of the Orthodox and Catholic Churches at Nicaea is held to mark the 1,700th anniversary of the Council of Nicaea.
  - Two tankers believed to be part of the Russian shadow fleet are attacked using unspecified weapons and set on fire in the Black Sea.

=== December ===
- 2 December – A Russian-flagged tanker heading to Sinop is attacked by a drone 80 miles from the Turkish Black Sea coast. The ship and crew are unharmed.
- 8 December – A police officer is killed in a shootout during a drug raid in Çekmeköy, Istanbul.
- 11 December – Five people are arrested as part of an investigation into the sexual harassment of female interns at the Grand National Assembly in Ankara.
- 15 December – The Turkish Air Force shoots down an unidentified drone that had entered the country's airspace over the Black Sea.
- 19 December – An unidentified drone crashes into a field in Kocaeli Province.
- 22 December – The Grand National Assembly extends the mandate for Turkish military intervention in Libya until 2027.
- 23 December – A jet crashes shortly after takeoff from Ankara, killing all eight occupants, including Mohammed Ali Ahmed al-Haddad, the chief of staff of the Libyan Army.
- 24 December – Fenerbahçe S.K. president Sadettin Saran is arrested after testing positive for illegal drugs.
- 25 December – Authorities announce the arrest of 115 suspected Islamic State members following raids on 124 locations in Istanbul on suspicion of plotting attacks over the Christmas and New Year holidays.
- 29 December –
  - Six suspected Islamic State members and three police officers are killed in shootout during a raid at a residence in Elmalik, Yalova Province.
  - Turkey and Armenia reach an agreement allowing for the issuance of free electronic visas for holders of diplomatic, special and service passports from both countries.
- 31 December – Authorities announce the arrest of 125 suspected Islamic State members following raids on across 25 provinces.

== Holidays ==
- 1 January – New Year's Day
- 30 March to 1 April – Ramazan Bayramı
- 23 April – Children's Day
- 1 May – Labour Day
- 19 May – Youth and Sports Day
- 6 June to 9 June – Kurban Bayramı
- 15 July – Democracy and National Unity Day
- 30 August – Victory Day
- 29 October – Republic Day

== Deaths ==
- 2 January – Ferdi Tayfur, 79, singer.
- 4 January – Yılmaz Urul, 82, footballer.
- 7 January – Ayla Erduran, 90, violinist.
- 8 January – Selim İleri, 75, writer.
- 14 January – Ishak Haleva, 86, chief rabbi of Turkey.
- 16 January – Yusuf Kırkpınar, 75, politician.
- 30 January – İlhan Usmanbaş, 103, contemporary classical composer.
- 2 February – Ogün Altıparmak, 86, footballer.
- 6 February – Zeynep Korkmaz, 103, scholar.
- 13 February – Fethi Heper, 81, footballer.
- 20 February – Feroz Ahmad, 87, academic.
- 24 February – Hasan Çelebi, 87, calligrapher.
- 27 February – Derya Erke, 41, swimmer.
- 2 March – Edip Akbayram, 74, musician.
- 20 March – Osman Sınav, 68, director.
- 21 March – Filiz Akın, 82, actress.
- 27 March – Berkin Usta, 24, skier.
- 31 March – Volkan Konak, 58, folk singer.
- 3 April – Seyit Halil Özsoy, 77, politician.
- 4 April – Eraslan Özkaya, 85, judge.
- 3 May – Sırrı Süreyya Önder, 62, actor, film director, MP (2011–2018, since 2023) and deputy speaker (since 2023) of the Grand National Assembly.
- 15 May – Ali Özgentürk, 79, director.
- 19 May – Yusuf Ziya Bahadınlı, 97, politician.
- 23 May – Rüşdü Saracoğlu, 77, economist.
- 26 May – İlhan Şeşen, 76, musician.
- 9 June – Ferdi Zeyrek, 48, mayor of Manisa (since 2024).
- 4 July – Nihat Genç, 69, journalist.
- 9 July – Rüçhan Çamay, 94, singer and actress.
- 11 July – Yiğit Bulut, 53, journalist and conspiracy theorist.
- 15 July:
  - Pınar Kür, 82, novelist, dramatist, and translator.
  - Emre Törün, 53, actor and voice actor.
- 19 July – Altan Öymen, 93, journalist and politician.
- 20 July – Lale Karabıyık, 59, scholar and politician.
- 26 July – Süreyya Serdengeçti, 73, economist.
- 29 July – Süreyya Özkefe, 86, footballer.
- 5 August – Selçuk Alagöz, 81, singer and songwriter.
- 7 August – Ümit Aktan, 76, sportscaster, journalist, author and presenter.
- 15 August – Ali Boğa, 76, MP (2011–2015).
- 18 August – Banu Kırbağ, 74, singer, composer and arranger.
- 30 August – Anta Toros, 77, actress.
- 7 September – Cahit Karakaş, 97, minister of transport (1971) and speaker of the Grand National Assembly (1977–1980).
- 8 September – Agah Oktay Güner, 88, journalist and politician.
- 28 September – Yavuz Bülent Bâkiler, 89, poet and writer.
- 8 October – Niyazi Sayın, 98, ney player and music educator.
- 16 October – Arif Erkin Güzelbeyoğlu, 90, actor and musician.
- 1 November – Faruk Fatih Özer, 31, cryptocurrency trader and convicted fraudster, founder of Thodex.
- 12 November – Muazzez Abacı, 78, singer.
- 11 December – Nermin Abadan Unat, 104, academic, lawyer, sociologist, and writer.
- 31 December – Gökmen Özdenak, 78, footballer.

== See also ==
- Outline of Turkey
- Index of Turkey-related articles
- List of Turkey-related topics
- History of Turkey
- Other events in 2025
