= 2023 in Turkey =

- Centuries: 20th; 21st
- Decades: 2000s; 2010s; 2020s; 2030s
- See also: List of years in Turkey

Individuals and events related to 2023 in Turkey.

== Incumbents ==
- President: Recep Tayyip Erdoğan
- 29th Speaker of the Grand National Assembly: Mustafa Şentop → Devlet Bahçeli → Numan Kurtulmuş
- President of the Constitutional Court: Zühtü Arslan
- Chief of the Turkish General Staff of the Armed Forces: Yaşar Güler
- Government: 66th government of Turkey → 67th government of Turkey
- Cabinet: Fourth Erdoğan Cabinet → Fifth Erdoğan Cabinet

== Events ==
=== Ongoing ===
- 2016–present purges in Turkey

=== January ===
- 2 January - With the decision of the Council of State by a majority vote, Turkey's decision to withdraw from the Istanbul Convention became final.
- 3 January - A cooperation agreement in the field of natural gas was signed between Turkey and Bulgaria.
- 5 January
  - A Turkish coast guard vessel exchanges warning shots with a Greek coast guard vessel near the Greek island of Farmakonisi.
  - The Constitutional Court decided to block HDP's treasury aid account.
- 7 January - Five people are killed, and 23 others are injured in a bus crash in Diyarbakır.
- 13 January - Rami Library is put into service.
- 21 January - The Turkish defense ministry cancels Swedish defense minister Pål Jonson's upcoming visit to Turkey in response to an approval for far-right extremist Rasmus Paludan to protest in front of the Turkish embassy in Stockholm.
- 30 January - The Nation Alliance announced the Common Policies Memorandum of Understanding, which includes its actions after the general election.

=== February ===
- 2 February - The Netherlands, Germany, the UK, France, Belgium, Sweden, Italy, and Switzerland closed their consulates in Istanbul for security reasons.
- 5 February - At least eight people are killed and 42 injured when a bus crashes and overturns in Afyonkarahisar Province.
- 6 February - 2023 Turkey–Syria earthquake
- 7 February - A state of emergency was declared for 3 months in 10 provinces due to the earthquake.
- 9 February - Three inmates are killed and 12 more injured after soldiers open fire during a prison riot in Hatay Province. The prisoners were demanding to see their families affected by the recent earthquake.
- 17 February - A Syrian family of seven, including five children, is killed by a fire that struck a home in Nurdağı, Gaziantep Province, which they moved to after surviving the earthquake. Seven other people were injured during the fire.
- 20 February - A magnitude 6.4 earthquake struck in southern Turkey and is also felt in Syria, Lebanon and Egypt.
- 27 February - One person is killed, and 69 others are injured during a magnitude 5.6 earthquake in Yeşilyurt, Malatya.

=== March ===
- 5 March - Nation Alliance member Meral Akşener left the alliance in response to the selection of Kemal Kılıçdaroğlu as the presidential candidate. However, a day later, she abandoned this decision and accepted Kılıçdaroğlu's candidacy.
- 7 March - The Nation Alliance, which was established by the alliance of six political parties, publicly known as the Table of Six, announced CHP leader Kemal Kılıçdaroğlu as its presidential candidate in the upcoming election.
- 9 March - The third meeting of the tripartite memorandum between Finland, Sweden and Turkey was held in Brussels, Belgium.
- 10 March - Pınar Gültekin murder suspect Cemal Metin Avcı was sentenced to aggravated life imprisonment.
- 15 March - 2023 Turkey floods
- 17 March – Turkish president Recep Tayyip Erdoğan submits a bill on granting Finland membership into NATO to the Grand National Assembly.
- 18 March - Foreign Minister Mevlüt Çavuşoğlu met with Egyptian Foreign Minister Sameh Shoukry in Cairo. With this, diplomatic relations between Turkey and Egypt, which had been cut for 11 years, were resumed.
- 19 March - Turkey's first boron carbide production facility was opened in Bandırma, Balıkesir.
- 30 March – Turkey's Grand National Assembly approves Finland's NATO membership bid.
- 31 March – President Recep Tayyip Erdoğan signed and approved the proposal containing Finland's accession protocol to NATO.

=== April ===
- 10 April - The amphibious assault ship, TCG Anadolu, was delivered to the Turkish Naval Forces.
- 15 April - İMECE, Turkey's first domestic satellite with sub-meter resolution, was launched from Vandenberg Space Force Base with SpaceX's Falcon 9 Block 5 rocket at 09:48 Turkish time.
- 17 April - Istanbul Financial Center was put into service.
- 20 April - 710 billion cubic meters of natural gas discovered approximately 170 kilometers off the Black Sea began to be extracted.
- 23 April - The Altay tank was delivered to the Turkish Land Forces for testing.
- 25 April - The TAI Hürjet made its first flight.
- 26 April - Ankara–Sivas high-speed railway was put into service.
- 27 April:
  - Teknofest 2023 was held at Atatürk Airport until 1 May.
  - Akkuyu Nuclear Power Plant gained the status of a nuclear facility by bringing in nuclear fuel.
  - The first National Electric Train set was delivered to TCDD.

=== May ===
- 2 May - Karapınar solar power plant, the largest in Europe and Turkey, was put into service.
- 3 May - The Zigana Tunnel, the third longest tunnel in the world and the longest in Europe and Turkey, with a length of 14,476 meters, was put into service.
- 14 May - 2023 Turkish parliamentary election and first round of 2023 Turkish presidential election
- 28 May - second round of 2023 Turkish presidential election; Recep Tayyip Erdoğan is elected for president.

=== June ===
- 3 June - Members of the 67th cabinet of Turkey were announced.
- 10 June - The 2023 UEFA Champions League final was held at the Atatürk Olympic Stadium.
- 14 June - The fourth meeting of the tripartite memorandum between Finland, Sweden and Turkey was held in Ankara, Turkey.
- 15 June - Two families clashed due to a land dispute in Diyarbakır's Bismil district. 9 people were killed, and 2 were injured.

=== July ===
- 6 July - The fifth meeting of the tripartite memorandum between Finland, Sweden, and Turkey was held in Brussels, Belgium.

=== September ===
- 6 September – At least 10 people are killed by floods caused by torrential rain in Bulgaria, Turkey, and Greece.
- 22 September – Turkish police announces that they have detained 10 people with links to the Islamic State in İzmir after intelligence revealed hidden explosives manufacturing supplies.

=== October ===
- 1 October – The capital Ankara was struck by a terrorist attack which was carried out by two members of the PKK. The attack took place in front of the entrance gate to the General Directorate of Security building.
- 2 October – Turkey launches airstrikes against around 20 PKK targets in northern Iraq, in response to the PKK's bombing of Ankara, killing an unknown number of militants.
- 19 October – Israel withdraws its ambassador Irit Lillian and other diplomats from Turkey after urging its citizens to avoid all travel to the country.
- 23 October – Turkish president Recep Tayyip Erdoğan submits a bill on granting Sweden membership into NATO to the Grand National Assembly.

=== November ===
- 4 November – Turkey recalls its ambassador to Israel in response to Israel's military actions in the Gaza Strip.
- 5 November – Pro-Palestinian protestors clash with police in attempting to overrun the USAF occupying Incirlik Air Base.
- 7 November –
  - Trade between Turkey and Israel decreased by half since the start of the war, compared with the same period last year, according to the Turkish trade minister.
  - Turkey’s parliament removes Coca-Cola and Nestle products from restaurants in the country over their alleged support for Israel.
- 20 November – Nine people are killed, and eleven more are missing during floods across Turkey.
- 30 November — Mohamed, the son of president of somalia Hassan Shekh Mohamud, hit Yunus Emre Göçer, a motorcycle courier, on the Kennedy Avenue highway.

=== December ===
- 22 December – Police across Turkey arrests at least 304 people during simultaneous raids against "suspected Islamic State members".
- 28 December – At least 10 people are killed and 57 others injured by a multiple-vehicle collision on a motorway in Sakarya Province.

== Arts and entertainment ==
- List of Turkish films of 2023
- List of 2023 box office number-one films in Turkey

== Deaths ==
=== February ===
- 6 February: (in the 2023 Turkey–Syria earthquake)
  - Cemal Kütahya, 32, handball player
  - Yakup Taş, 63, politician, MP (since 2018)
  - Ahmet Eyüp Türkaslan, 28, footballer (Osmanlıspor, Ümraniyespor, Yeni Malatyaspor)
  - Zilan Tigris, 50, singer
  - Nilay Aydogan, 30, basketball player
- 9 February – Sıtkı Güvenç, 61, politician, MP (2011–2015)
- 11 February – Deniz Baykal, 84, politician and former CHP leader
- 17 February – Alparslan Arslan, 46, convicted criminal
- 18 February – Ahmet Suat Özyazıcı, 86, footballer
- 20 February – Şener Eruygur, 81, army general
- 26 February – Ziya Şengül, 79, footballer

=== March ===
- 10 March:
  - Vefa Tanır, 96, politician and minister
  - Ayşegül Sarıca, 87, pianist
- 24 March – Orhan Karaveli, 93, journalist and writer
- 26 March – Köksal Engür, 77, actor

=== April ===
- 13 April – Julia Ituma, 18, volleyball player, fall.

=== May ===
- 24 May:
  - İlham Gencer, 97, jazz pianist, singer and composer
  - Ergun Öztuna, 85, footballer
  - Adil Serdar Saçan, 60, police chief

=== June ===
- 4 June – Selahattin Çetiner, 100, politician and lieutenant general
- 30 June – Murat Karagöz, 55, diplomat

=== July ===
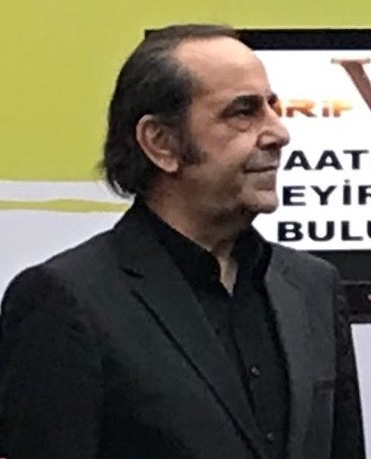
Özkan Uğur

- 8 July – Özkan Uğur, 69, musician and actor
- 12 July – Abdulbaki Erol, 74, Islamic scholar and the leader of the Menzil community
- 19 July – Roni Margulies, 68, poet and author
- 25 July – Yılmaz Gruda, 93, actor and poet

=== August ===
- 15 August – Sakıp Özberk, 78, footballer

=== September ===
- 5 September – Necmettin Cevheri, 93, politician and lawyer
- 15 September:
  - Burhan Sargun, 94, footballer
  - Gökhan Abur, 79, musician and meteorologist
- 26 September – Hıfzı Topuz, 100, journalist and novelist
- 27 September – Seda Fettahoğlu, 44, actress
- 30 September – Galip Haktanır, 102, footballer

=== October ===
- 9 October – Haluk Akakçe, 53, artist
- 21 October – Burak Bekdil, 57, columnist
- 29 October – Jeyan Mahfi Tözüm, 95, actress and voice artist

=== December ===
- 13 December – Yılmaz Atadeniz, 91, film director
- 14 December – Hasan Bitmez, 53, politician
- 26 December – Yaşar Okuyan, 73, politician

== See also ==
- Outline of Turkey
- Index of Turkey-related articles
- List of Turkey-related topics
- History of Turkey
