= Neyzi =

Neyzi is a Turkish surname. Notable people with the surname include:

- Leyla Neyzi (born 1961), Turkish academic anthropologist, sociologist and historian
- Olcay Neyzi (1927–2022), Turkish doctor, mother of Leyla
