= 2024 Antalya local elections =

- 31 March 2024; Part of the 2024 Turkish local elections
- Turnout: 78.5% (▼6.7 pp)
- Metropolitan Municipality
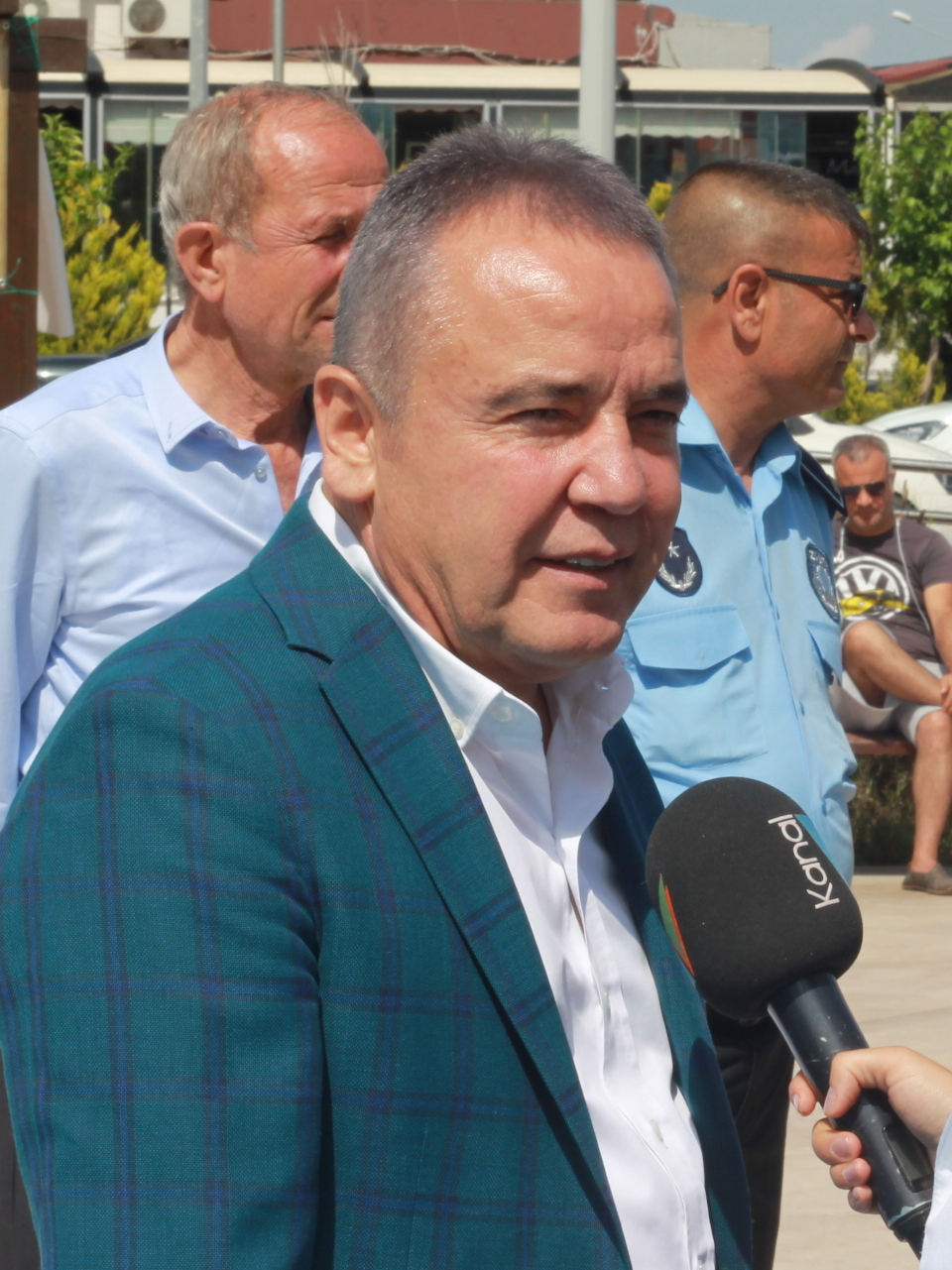

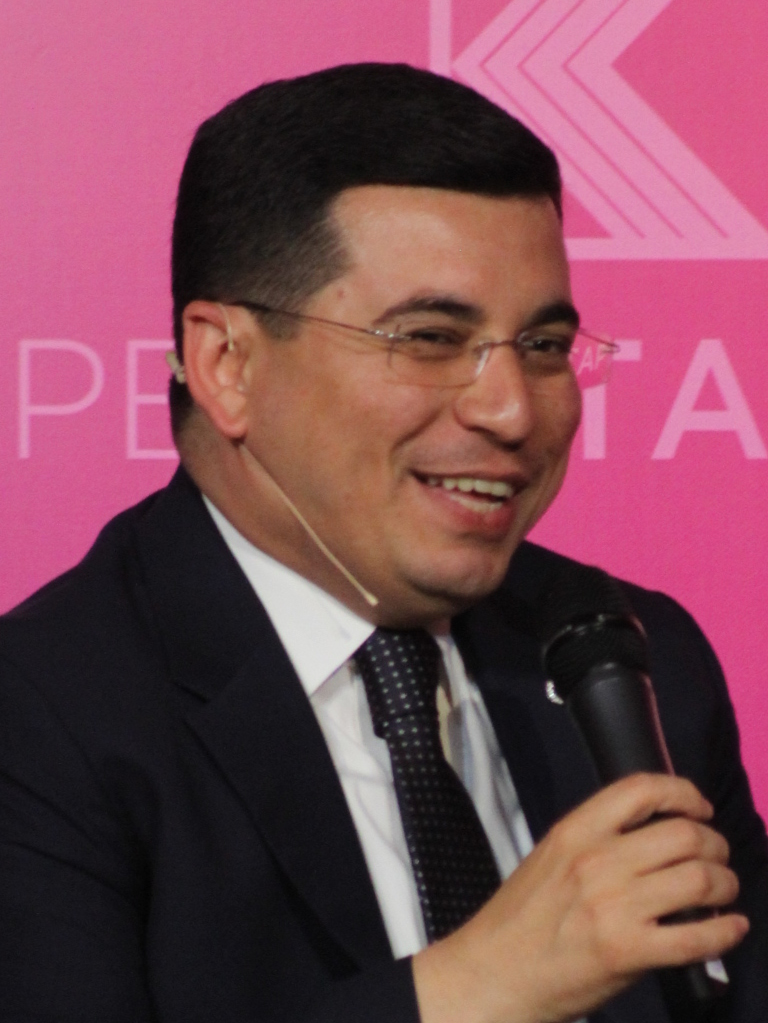
Nominee	Muhittin Böcek	Hakan Tütüncü
Party	CHP	AK Party
Alliance		People
Popular vote	706,877	580,891
Percentage	48.71%	40.03%
- CHP AK Party
- District Municipalities
- All 19 municipal districts of Antalya
Party	Seats	+/–
CHP	16	+7
AK Party	2	−4
DP	1	+1
This lists parties that won seats. See the complete results below.
Districts won by CHP
Districts won by AK Party
Districts won by DP
Mayor of Antalya before	Mayor of Antalya after
Muhittin Böcek; CHP	Muhittin Böcek; CHP

Local elections were held in the Turkish province of Antalya as part of nationwide local elections on 31 March 2024. 20 mayors were elected, 19 for each of the districts of Antalya, and one for the Antalya Metropolitan Municipality. Municipal councils for the 19 district municipalities and the Antalya Metropolitan Municipality were also elected.

The incumbent mayor of the metropolitan municipality, Muhittin Böcek, retained his position with a plurality.

== Candidates ==
For the metropolitan municipality, 27 candidates have registered for the role. The most popular candidates in Antalya are the incumbent Mayor Muhittin Böcek and Hakan Tütüncü, the candidate of the largest party in Turkey. The other candidates include:

- Nesrin Ünal, Candidate of the Good Party (İYİ)
- Oğuz Ersöz, Candidate of the Victory Party (ZP)
- Ümit Özkurt, Candidate of the New Welfare Party (YRP)
- Kemal Bülbül, Candidate of the DEM Party
- Serdar Üsküplü, Candidate of the Patriotic Party

While the ruling People's Alliance unified behind Hakan Tütüncü, opposition parties did not field a joint candidate.

== Opinion Polls ==
Fieldwork date	Polling firm	Sample size	CHP	AK PARTY	İYİ	DEM	ZP	YRP	Others	Lead
March	GENAR	?	43,7	45,7	3,7	2	1,7	1,8	1,4	2
25-26 March	ORC	2.720	44,5	39	7,3	5,9	—	—	3,3	5,5
12-26 March	Avrasya	?	43,3	41,7	—	—	—	—	15	1,6
21-25 March	Areda Survey	4.358	44	42,3	3,7	4,9	2,7	1,5	0,8	1,7
18-24 March	ALF	3.200	38,5	40,7	9,1	6,5	—	—	5,2	2,2
20-22 March	Pollstar	3.000	37,6	44,3	7,1	5,7	—	—	5,3	6,7
13-18 March	ASAL	1.500	41,4	39,6	6,9	4,1	1,9	2,5	3,6	1,8
1-15 March	ADA	1.500	41,5	44,2	5,8	—	—	—	8,5	2,7
21 February-4 March	MAK	1.910	34	41	7	7	2	1,5	2,5	7
1-2 March	Özdemir	8.444	40,5	42,3	4,1	5,1	2,9	2,7	2,4	1,8
18-20 February	Optimar	2.500	46,6	45,1	2,9	1,5	0,7	2,5	0,7	1,5
2024
September	ASAL	1.764	37,3	34	10,6	2,1	—	—	16,3	3,3
2023
31 March 2019	2019 election	1.411.011	50,6	46,3	—	—	—	—	3,1	4,3

Districts

=== Alanya ===
Fieldwork date	Polling firm	Sample size	MHP	İYİ	CHP	Others	Lead
23-26 March	Pi-Ar	1.400	31,2	37.3	28	3.5	6,1
20-23 March	ORC	1.500	30,2	38,1	27,1	4,6	7,9
2024
31 March 2019	2019 election	163.291	57,6	36,2	—	6,2	21,4

=== Döşemealtı ===
Fieldwork date	Polling firm	Sample size	CHP	AK PARTY	İYİ	DEM	Others	Lead
20-23 March	ORC	850	39,2	42	6,9	3,5	8,4	2,8
2024
31 March 2019	2019 election	38.360	48,7	48,5	—	—	2,8	0,2

=== Kaş ===
Fieldwork date	Polling firm	Sample size	AK PARTY	CHP	WPT	İYİ	DP	Others	Lead
26 March	Kırmızı Kare	11.516	52,8	39,8	5,1	2,3	—N/a	—	13
2024
31 March 2019	2019 election	38.051	42,9	34,9	—	—	21,0	1,2	8

=== Kepez ===
Fieldwork date	Polling firm	Sample size	AK PARTY	CHP	DEM	İYİ	Others	Lead
20-23 March	ORC	1.650	38,4	42,1	7,2	6,5	5,8	3,7
2024
31 March 2019	2019 election	297.906	50,4	44,6	—	—	5	5,8

=== Konyaaltı ===
Fieldwork date	Polling firm	Sample size	CHP	AK PARTY	WPT	İYİ	Others	Lead
20-23 March	ORC	1.740	49,6	23,2	10,9	10,4	5,9	26,4
2024
31 March 2019	2019 election	95.858	66,8	30,8	—	—	2,4	36

== Results ==
The CHP held the metropolitan municipality mayorship and won mayorships in 16 district municipalities. The AK Party on the other hand only won mayorships in 2 districts. The Democrat Party only won the Kumluca district mayorship. MHP, the DSP and İYİ failed to win any municipalities.

=== Antalya Metropolitan Municipality ===
Candidate	Party	Votes	Percentage (%)
Muhittin Böcek	CHP	706,877	48.7%
Hakan Tütüncü	AK Party	580,891	40.0%
Kemal Bülbül	DEM Party	45,070	3.1%
Nesrin Ünal	İYİ Party	38,876	2.7%
Oğuz Ersöz	ZP	24,128	1.7%
Ümit Özkurt	YRP	17,123	1.2%
Hasan Hüsein Ataşoğlu	DP	8,423	0.6%
Mehmet İlteber Bahadır	BTP	4,690	0.3%
Nazlı Ece Mutlu	TKP	2,809	0.2%
Kıvanç Çetinkaya	DEVA Party	2,318	0.2%
Elif Bilen Taş	EMEP	2,279	0.2%
Independent candidates	N/A	2,177	0.2%
Abdulbaki Özdemir	HÜDA PAR	1,992	0.1%
Hakan Şaklar	DSP	1,369	0.1%
Serdar Üsküplü	VP	1,251	0.1%
Ayhan Uzun	AB Party	980	0.1%
Sadettin Gündüz	Millet Party	920	0.1%
Osman Koç	AP	913	0.1%
Sultan Bayram	HAK-PAR	715	0.0%
Nimet Çakılkaya	TKH	679	0.0%
Mevlüt Yakışıklı	Milli Yol	518	0.0%
Total		1,444,998	100%

=== District Municipalities ===
==== Akseki ====
Party	Candidate	Votes	%
CHP	İlkay Akca	3,758	46.35
AK Party	İbrahim Özkan	3,740	46.13
Memleket	Mustafa Kavasoğlu	183	2.26
İYİ	Ali Kartal	139	1.71
YRP	Tufan Meyuk	81	1
SAADET	Tahsin Arslan	79	0.97
Victory Party	Cemil Zıngal	70	0.86
DP	Fatih Öztürk	17	0.21
BTP	Esmagül Taşpınar	15	0.19
DSP	Berke Ertem	13	0.16
Free Cause Party	Zülküf Elaltunkara	12	0.15
Patriotic	Recep Deveci	1	0.01
Total votes		8,108	100.00
Turnout		8,738	84
Registered electors		10,403	
CHP gain from AK Party			

==== Aksu ====
Total registered count		Total ballot box count		
57,075		182		
Candidates			Results	
Abbr	Party	Candidate	Votes	%
CHP	Republican People's Party	İsa Yıldırım	24,646	54.75%
AK Party	Justice and Development Party	Durmuş Kaan Şahin	15,348	34.09%
DEM	Peoples' Equality and Democracy Party	Rezzan Çelik	1,662	3.69%
İYİ	Good Party	Deniz Karataş	1,179	2.62%
YRP	New Welfare Party	Cemal Kamar	579	1.29%
Büyük Birlik	Great Unity Party	İsmail Metin	497	1.1%
Victory Party	Victory Party	Naim Uygun	405	0.9%
SAADET	Felicity Party	Latif Mercan	168	0.37%
BTP	Independent Turkey Party	Bilal Şahin	131	0.29%
Free Cause Party	Free Cause Party	Ömer Arslanğray	111	0.25%
Democracy and Progress Party	Democracy and Progress Party	Hakan Halim Okudan	71	0.16%
DSP	Democratic Left Party	Cihan Demirtaş	69	0.15%
TİP	Workers' Party of Turkey	Oğuzhan Demir	62	0.14%
HKP	People's Liberation Party	Yılmaz Fidan	40	0.09%
Patriotic	Patriotic Party	Turabi Akyürek	26	0.06%
Justice Unity Party (Turkey)	Justice Unity Party	Mustafa Oğuztürk Zenginoğlu	23	0.05%
Total			45,017	100%
Invalid or blank			2,292	
Turnout			82.89%	
Mayor before: Halil Şahin (AK Party)
Mayor after: İsa Yıldırım (CHP)

==== Alanya ====
Total registered count		Total ballot box count		
234,347		745		
Candidates			Results	
Abbr	Party	Candidate	Votes	%
CHP	Republican People's Party	Osman Tarık Özçelik	79,893	45.5%
MHP	Nationalist Movement Party	Adem Murat Yücel	46,821	26.66%
İYİ	Good Party	Mehmet Şahin	38,067	21.68%
DEM	Peoples' Equality and Democracy Party	Mehmet Şirin Filiz	2,977	1.7%
Victory Party	Victory Party	Tahsin Biner	2,292	1.31%
YRP	New Welfare Party	Enes Nergiz	1,709	0.97%
AP	Justice Party	Haydar Yıldız	795	0.45%
Future Party	Future Party	Mevlüt Demir	613	0.35%
Büyük Birlik	Great Unity Party	İlhan Ceylan	576	0.33%
Free Cause Party	Free Cause Party	Alpaslan Edizer	375	0.21%
Democracy and Progress Party	Democracy and Progress Party	Cem Sak	348	0.2%
TİP	Workers' Party of Turkey	Hülya Arga	259	0.15%
TKP	Communist Party of Turkey	Canel Durak	235	0.13%
BTP	Independent Turkey Party	Orhan Dallı	232	0.13%
Patriotic	Patriotic Party	Evren Kurtoğlu	202	0.12%
Ind	Independent politician	Adnan Celiloğlu	111	0.06%
DSP	Democratic Left Party	Yüksel Uzan	98	0.06%
Total			175,603	100%
Invalid or blank			9,202	
Turnout			78.79%	
Mayor before: Adem Murat Yücel (MHP)
Mayor after: Osman Tarık Özçelik (CHP)
