= 2022 in Turkey =

- Centuries: 20th; 21st
- Decades: 2000s; 2010s; 2020s; 2030s
- See also: List of years in Turkey

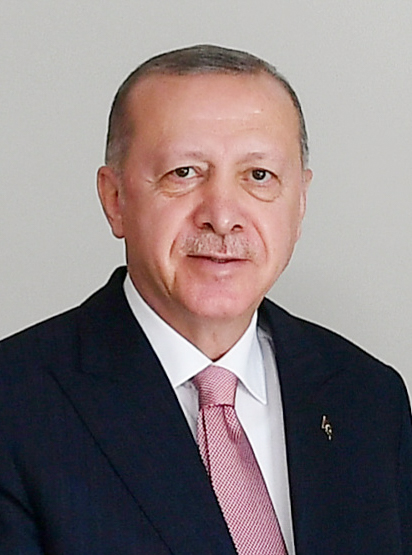
President of the Republic of Türkiye Recep Tayyip Erdoğan

Individuals and events related to Turkey in 2022.

== Incumbents ==
- President: Recep Tayyip Erdoğan
- 29th Speaker of the Grand National Assembly: Mustafa Şentop
- President of the Constitutional Court: Zühtü Arslan
- Chief of the Turkish General Staff of the Armed Forces: Yaşar Güler
- Government: 66th government of Turkey
- Cabinet: Fourth Erdoğan Cabinet

== Events ==
=== Ongoing ===
- COVID-19 pandemic in Turkey
- Purges in Turkey (2016–present)
- 2018–2022 Turkish currency and debt crisis

=== January ===
- January: Turkey's authorities decided to rebrand their country's international image. President Recep Tayyip Erdoğan issued a communiqué, tweaking the country's internationally recognised name from "Turkey" to "Türkiye".
- 1 January: Turkey lifts its embargo on Armenia.
- 8 January: Konya - Karaman high-speed train line was put into service.
- 13 January: Turkey's first pocket satellite was launched into space.
- 14 January: The first meeting of the normalization process of Armenia–Turkey relations was held in Moscow, Russia.
- 23 January: Storm Elpis

=== February ===
- 2 February: After the start of the normalization process between Armenia and Turkey, flights between the two countries started.
- 5 February: Recep Tayyip Erdoğan, and his wife, Emine Erdoğan, contract COVID-19 and have mild symptoms.
- 16 February: The Council of Higher Education announced that the threshold score in the Higher Education Institutions Exam was removed.

=== March ===
- 2 March: Due to the COVID-19 pandemic in Turkey, the HES Code application, which had been implemented since 10 April 2020, and the obligation to wear masks in open areas were lifted as a result of the Coronavirus Scientific Advisory Board meeting held on 2 March 2022. However, the Advisory Board announced that the HES Code application would continue in public transport and the use of masks in closed areas will continue.
- 9 March: Israeli President Isaac Herzog meets Erdoğan in Ankara, in what is perceived to be a renewal of relations between Israel and Turkey, which have been poor since 2010.
- 10 March: Russian Foreign Minister Sergey Lavrov and Ukrainian Foreign Minister Dmytro Kuleba discussed the Russian-Ukrainian War in Antalya. Negotiations on ending the Russian invasion of Ukraine, the evacuation of civilians and a ceasefire were not fruitful.
- 18 March: The Kınalı-Balıkesir Motorway, which the 1915 Çanakkale Bridge is a part of, was put into service.
- 29 March: Russian and Ukrainian delegations met in Dolmabahçe, Istanbul as part of the Russia-Ukraine Peace Talks. Even though the meeting ended without positive results, the Ukrainian authorities stated that they would like to see Turkey among the guarantor countries.

=== April ===
- 7 April: The case file on the murder of journalist Jamal Khashoggi at the Consulate General of Saudi Arabia in Istanbul on 2 October 2018 was transferred to Saudi Arabia.
- 17 April: Operation Claw-Lock
- 26 April: As a result of the decision taken by the Coronavirus Scientific Advisory Board, the obligation to use masks in closed areas was removed. However, it was announced that the obligation to wear masks in public transportation vehicles and hospitals would continue.
- 27 April: In the FIBA Europe Cup final, Bahçeşehir Koleji S.K. defeated Pallacanestro Reggiana and became the 2021–22 FIBA Europe Cup champion. In addition, Bahçeşehir Koleji became the first Turkish team to win the cup.

=== May ===
- 18 May: Turkey quickly blocked the start of accession negotiations for Finland and Sweden to NATO.
- 21 May: Anadolu Efes S.K. became the EuroLeague champion for the second time in a row by beating their opponent Real Madrid Baloncesto in the 2021–22 EuroLeague final match.
- 22 May: In the 2021–22 CEV Women's Champions League final, VakıfBank S.K. became the European champion for the fifth time by beating its rival Imoco Volley.
- 25 May: For the first time in 15 years, Israel and Turkey held a meeting at the level of the Minister of Foreign Affairs. Foreign Minister Mevlüt Çavuşoğlu met with his Israeli counterpart, Yair Lapid, in Tel Aviv, where regional issues and relations between the two countries were discussed.
  - The first meeting of the delegations of Finland, Sweden and Turkey was held in Ankara, Turkey.

=== June ===
- 2 June: The United Nations agrees to officially change the English name of the country from Turkey to Türkiye.
- 14 June: Türksat 5B was put into service.
- 20 June: The second meeting of the delegations of Finland, Sweden and Turkey was held in Brussels, Belgium.
- 21 June: A forest fire started around Marmaris's Bördübet village.
- 22 June: An Iranian spy gang, which was preparing to attack Israeli tourists in Istanbul, was caught as a result of the operation organized by the MİT and the Istanbul Police Department.
- 23 June: As part of the normalization process of Israel–Turkey relations, Foreign Minister Mevlüt Çavuşoğlu met with his Israeli counterpart, Yair Lapid, in Ankara.
- 24 June: The suspect, who was stated to have started the Marmaris forest fires, was arrested.
- 24 June: Numerous protesters gathered in front of the European Court of Human Rights (ECHR) in Strasbourg, France, to protest the injustices taking place in Türkiye.
- 25 June:
  - The operations in the Çöpler mine in the İliç district of Erzincan were stopped by the Ministry of Environment, Urbanisation and Climate Change due to environmental pollution caused by cyanide leakage.
  - Marmaris forest fires were brought under control on the 4th day.
- 28 June: Finland, Sweden, and Turkey sign a joint memorandum on security, clearing the way for Finland and Sweden's NATO accession bids.
- 30 June: The first monkeypox case in Turkey was announced by Health Minister Fahrettin Koca.

=== July ===
- 6 July:
  - Turkey finished the 2022 Mediterranean Games in second place after Italy with 108 medals.
  - After the death of specialist doctor Ekrem Karakaya at Konya City Hospital while on duty, the healthcare professionals decided to leave work on 7 and 8 July as a sign of protest.
- 7 July: Israeli Transport Minister Merav Michaeli announced that an aviation agreement would be signed between Israel and Turkey after 71 years.
- 9 July: Credit rating agency Fitch Ratings downgraded Turkey's credit rating from "B+" to "B", citing rising inflation, widening current account deficit and other economic risks.
- 11 July: President Recep Tayyip Erdoğan met with Prime Minister of Armenia Nikol Pashinyan. During their meeting, the two leaders emphasized the importance of the normalization process between Armenia and Turkey.
- 13 July:
  - A forest fire started in Datça, Muğla. The fire was brought under control after 24 hours. The Ministry of Agriculture and Forestry reported that 700 hectares of agricultural and forest areas were damaged and 7 people were injured.
  - A forest fire started at two different points in Çeşme, İzmir. The fire was brought under control after 24 hours. A total of 120 hectares of land was damaged in the two fires. Seven people were detained in connection with the cause of the fire.
  - Turkish, Ukrainian, Russian and UN delegations held a summit in Istanbul to discuss a solution to the Grain Crisis caused by the Russian invasion of Ukraine and the creation of a grain corridor by opening Ukrainian ports.
- 21 July: An earthquake with a magnitude of 4.6 occurred in Gönen, Balıkesir. The earthquake was felt in the surrounding cities.
- 22 July: The solution to the Grain Crisis caused by the Russian invasion of Ukraine and the agreement to open a grain corridor by opening the Ukrainian ports of Chornomorsk, Odesa and Yuzhne was signed by President of Turkey Recep Tayyip Erdoğan, United Nations Secretary General António Guterres, Russian Defense Minister Sergey Shoygu and Turkish Defense Minister Hulusi Akar in Dolmabahçe, Istanbul.
- 29 July: 5G started to be used for the first time in Turkey at Istanbul Airport.
- 30 July:
  - 2022 Turkish Super Cup.
  - National swimmer Aysu Türkoğlu became the youngest Turkish swimmer to cross the English Channel in 16 hours and 28 minutes.

=== August ===
- 4 August:
  - A fire broke out in the historical Balıklı Greek Hospital in Zeytinburnu, Istanbul. 104 patients in the hospital were evacuated and no one was killed or injured in the fire. The hospital became unusable as a result of the fire. Bakırköy Chief Public Prosecutor's Office launched an investigation on the issue.
  - The results of the Public Personnel Selection Exam held on 31 July became void due to a scandal that saw the questions leaked beforehand. Halis Aygün was dismissed as the President of Measuring, Selection and Placement Center and Bayram Ali Ersoy was appointed instead. The center announced that it had postponed in its sessions due to be held on 6–7 August and 14 August.
- 18 August: Israel and Turkey announce the resumption of full diplomatic relations.
- 20 August: 2022 Turkey bus crashes.
- 26 August:
  - The Ministry of Environment, Urbanization and Climate Change announced that the ship named "NAE Sao Paulo", which was brought to Turkey for dismantling from Brazil, would not be allowed to enter Turkish territorial waters on the grounds that it contains asbestos.
  - The first meeting of the tripartite memorandum between Finland, Sweden and Turkey was held in Vantaa, Finland.

=== September ===
- 1 September: An armed attack took place on the headquarters of the TFF in Riva, Istanbul, while the board of directors held a meeting. While no one was killed or injured as a result of the attack, two suspects who carried out the attack were caught.
- 18 September: Thousands march in Istanbul in an anti-LGBTQ march.
- 26 September: PKK militants opened fire on a police house in the Tece neighborhood of Mersin's Mezitli district, and a bomb attack was carried out.

=== October ===
- 6 October: Within the scope of the normalization process between Armenia and Turkey, President Recep Tayyip Erdoğan and Prime Minister of Armenia Nikol Pashinyan met for the first time at the European Political Community summit held in Prague.
- 14 October: an explosion in a mine in Amasra, Bartın Province, killed 42 people.
- 29 October: Turkey's domestic car Togg started mass production.

=== November ===
- 5 November: Gaziray suburban line was put into service.
- 12 November: At 18:57, a simultaneous earthquake drill was held for the first time in Turkey.
- 13 November: 2022 Istanbul bombing
- 20 November: Operation Claw-Sword
- 21 November: An earthquake with a magnitude of 5.4 occurred off the Datça district of Muğla.
- 22 November: Turkey's highest dam Yusufeli Dam came into service.
- 23 November: 2022 Düzce earthquake
- 25 November: The second meeting of the tripartite memorandum between Finland, Sweden and Turkey was held in Stockholm, Sweden.
- 26 November: Turkey's highest pedestal viaduct, Eğiste Hadimi Viaduct, was put into service.

=== December ===
- 14 December: Unmanned fighter aircraft Baykar Bayraktar Kızılelma made its first flight.
- 26 December: President Recep Tayyip Erdoğan announced that there were 170 billion cubic meters of natural gas reserves in the Black Sea. Thus, the total natural gas reserves in the Black Sea reached 710 billion cubic meters.

== Deaths ==
=== January ===
- 11 January: Ahmet Yılmaz Çalık, footballer (born 1994)
- 21 January: Selahattin Beyazıt, Turkish businessman (born 1931)
- 24 January
  - Fatma Girik, actress and politician (born 1942)
  - Ayberk Pekcan, actor (born 1970)

=== February ===
- 3 February : Olcay Neyzi, doctor (b. 1927)
- 6 February : Üner Tan, neuroscientist and evolutionary biologist (b. 1937)
- 15 February
  - Onur Kumbaracıbaşı, civil servant and politician (b. 1939)
  - Arif Şentürk, traditional folk singer (b. 1941)
- 22 February : Muvaffak "Maffy" Falay, jazz trumpeter (b. 1930)

=== March ===
- 3 March : Şenol Birol, footballer and manager (b. 1936)
- 21 March : Fevzi Zemzem, footballer and manager (b. 1941)
- 23 March : Özcan Köksoy, footballer (b. 1940)
- 28 March : Naci Erdem, footballer and manager (b. 1931)
- 31 March : Rıdvan Bolatlı, footballer (b. 1928)

=== April ===
- 21 April : Aydın İlter, former general of the Turkish Gendarmerie (b. 1930)
- 27 April : İsmail Ogan, freestyle wrestler and Olympic champion (b. 1933)

=== June ===
- 8 June : Tarhan Erdem, politician (born 1933)
- 28 June : Cüneyt Arkın, actor, director and producer (born 1937)

=== July ===
- 6 July : İlter Türkmen, diplomat and politician (b. 1927)
- 17 July : Erden Kıral, film director and screenwriter (b. 1942)
- 28 July : İlhan İrem, singer and songwriter (b. 1955)

=== August ===
- 16 August : Aydın Yelken, footballer (b. 1939)
- 20 August : Civan Canova, actor, playwright and theatre director (b. 1955)
- 22 August : Adnan Çoker, painter and academician (b. 1927)

=== September ===
- 11 September : Ahmet Toptaş, politician (b. 1949)
- 18 September : Mustafa Dağıstanlı, freestyle wrestler and Olympic champion (b. 1931)
- 22 September : Gürkan Coşkun, painter (b. 1941)

=== October ===
- 15 October : Billur Kalkavan, actress (b. 1962)
- 18 October : Bülend Özveren, television presenter and sports commentator (b. 1943)
- 25 October : Halit Kıvanç, journalist, writer, television and radio presenter (b. 1925)

=== November ===
- 20 November : Hıncal Uluç, journalist and writer (b. 1939)
- 27 November : Mehmet Oğuz, footballer (b. 1949)

== See also ==
- Outline of Turkey
- Index of Turkey-related articles
- List of Turkey-related topics
- History of Turkey
