= Özkaya =

Özkaya is a Turkish surname.

== People ==
- Ali Özkaya, a Justice and Development Party politician
- Eraslan Özkaya, a Turkish judge
- Naci Özkaya, a footballer who competed in the 1948 Summer Olympics
- Özgür Özkaya, a footballer for Altay S.K.
- Serkan Özkaya, a Turkish-American conceptual artist
