= Zeydan Karalar =

Turkish politician (born 1958)

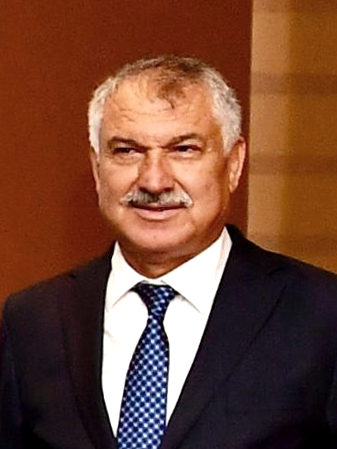

Deputy President of the Union of Municipalities of Turkey
- In office 23 March 2025 – 8 July 2025
- Preceded by: Ekrem İmamoğlu

Mayor of Adana
- In office 11 April 2019 – 8 July 2025
- Preceded by: Hüseyin Sözlü

Mayor of Seyhan
- In office 5 April 2014 – 11 April 2019
- Preceded by: Azim Öztürk
- Succeeded by: Akif Kemal Akay

Personal details
- Born: 1 January 1958 (age 68) Adana
- Party: Republican People's Party (CHP)
- Occupation: Politician, engineer

Zeydan Karalar (born 1 January 1958) is a Turkish engineer, politician, former Mayor of Adana Metropolitan Municipality, and former Deputy President of the Union of Municipalities of Turkey.

== Early life ==
He was born on 1 January 1958 in the Seyhan district of Adana. He attended primary school, middle school and high school in Adana and graduated from Çukurova University with a degree in mechanical engineering in 1980.

Karalar was elected President of the Chamber of Civil Engineers, serving as regional president and delegate to the higher council for two years. Between 1979 and 1985, he worked as Yarn Plant Manager at Çukobirlik. Between 1985 and 1991, he served as Customer Service Manager at AEG-ETİ.

== Political career ==
Karalar began his political career in 1977 by founding the (English: Democratic Left Higher Education Association) Demokratik Sol Yüksek Öğrenim Derneği and serving as its chairman. During the same period, he served as an accountant for the Adana Provincial Youth Branch of the Republican People's Party and chairman of the Adana Central District Youth Branch.

On 7 July 2010, he was appointed to the Adana Provincial Chairmanship of the Republican People's Party by the party's central committee, and was elected chairman at the Adana Provincial Congress of the Republican People's Party held on 23 January 2011.

Karalar, was elected Mayor of Seyhan with 31.7% of the vote and 136,457 votes in the 2014 Turkish local elections, was selected as the CHP's candidate for Mayor of Adana Metropolitan Municipality in the 2019 Turkish local elections at the CHP Party Assembly meeting held on 18 December 2018. He won the local elections held on 31 March 2019 with 53.69% of the vote and 656,704 votes and took office as Mayor of Adana Metropolitan Municipality on 11 April 2019 after receiving his certificate of election from the Supreme Election Board.

In 2022, he became co-chair of the United Cities and Local Governments Committee on Social Inclusion and Participatory Democracy.

Karalar was re-elected as the mayor of Adana Metropolitan Municipality in the 2024 Turkish local elections, running as the Republican People's Party candidate and receiving 42.82% of the vote.

On 23 March 2025, following the arrest of Ekrem İmamoğlu, he was temporarily appointed as Deputy President of the Union of Municipalities of Turkey.

Karalar was detained on 5 July 2025 as part of an investigation conducted by the Istanbul Chief Public Prosecutor's Office. The investigation is related to allegations against the Aziz İhsan Aktaş, and it is claimed that Karalar demanded unjust financial benefits from company executives who did business with the municipality during his tenure as Mayor of Seyhan. As part of the operation, searches were conducted at Karalar's home in Adana and the municipal building. Adıyaman Mayor Abdurrahman Tutdere and Antalya Metropolitan Mayor Muhittin Böcek were also detained as part of the same investigation.

Following Karalar's detention, CHP Adana Provincial Presidency organised support rallies with the slogan "Adana İradesine Sahip Çıkıyor". The rallies took place in front of Adana Metropolitan Municipality Building and the Atatürk Street was closed to traffic with the participation of thousands of citizens.

Karalar was arrested three days after this detention on 8 July 2025.

== Personal life ==
Karalar was born in 1958 as the sixth child in a family of ten children. He belongs to the Alawites ethnoreligious group. He married Nuray Karalar in 1982 and has three children, one daughter and two sons.

Political offices
Preceded by Hüseyin Sözlü	Mayor of Adana; 2019–present	Succeeded by Incumbent
