= Michael Skråmo =

- Born: 2 November 1985 (age 40); Bergsjön, Gothenburg, Sweden
- Other name: Abu Ibrahim Al-Swedi
- Children: 7

Michael Nikolai Skråmo (born 2 November 1985, presumed dead in March 2019) was a Swedish-Norwegian terrorist and member of the Islamic State (ISIS). He was a recruiter of IS-terrorists from the Nordic region. His mother revealed to SVT that she had received information that her son had died in early March 2019, during the final battles in the Syrian city of Al-Baghuz Fawqani. As of 2026, his fate is unknown.

== Biography ==
Skråmo grew up in Gothenburg and also had Norwegian citizenship, training to become a chef. He converted to Islam after becoming interested in religions during his school years. In 2005, he travelled to Egypt where he studied the Arabic language and Islam, and after that he travelled throughout Sweden and Europe preaching salafism and announced his support for Islamic terrorist attacks. While in Egypt he called himself Abdul Samad and became known under that name in the salafist movement's social media posts. He told close relatives in Sweden that he planned to travel to Syria, but only told them that he would be working as a chef in an Islamic State controlled hospital. He travelled from Gothenburg to Raqqa, Syria in 2014 along with his wife who also had converted to Islam, and he became a recruiter of members of the terrorist group by posting photos and videos of himself on social media wearing military clothes, using Facebook under the names of Abu Ibrahim Al-Swedi and Abdulsamad al-Swedi. Al-Swedi is Arabic for "the Swede" and his recruitment targeted mostly Sweden and the other Nordic countries. In videos on social media he called for terror cells in Europe to proceed to engage in terrorist attacks in Europe.

His wife was killed in a grenade attack in Baghouz in north western Syria in December 2018. In March 2019, during the final battle against ISIS in Baghouz it was reported by media that Skråmo had been arrested by Kurdish forces, but his name was missing from the official lists of captured IS terrorists; later on his mother in Sweden announced that she had received information about his death. Norwegian security police opened an investigation into terrorism crimes committed by Skråmo and he is wanted internationally by Interpol. On 18 April, Swedish authorities announced that Skråmo's seven children would be able to leave the al-Hawl refugee camp in Syria to be transported to the Swedish consulate in Erbil, Iraq. The children which Skråmo fathered with his now deceased wife were transported to Erbil in early May, and on 14 May they returned to Sweden where they were placed in child protective custody.

== See also ==
- Joakim Medin, writer of a book about Skråmo's wife
