= Ayyıldız Movement =

Turkish far-right nationalist group

Ayyıldız Movement (Ayyıldız Hareketi)
- Flag of the Ayyıldız Movement
- Founder: Ümit Özdağ
- Ideology: Turkish nationalism; Pan-Turkism; Idealism; Kemalism; Turanism; Nativism; Anti-Arabism; Anti-Kurdism; Anti-immigration
- Political position: Far-right
- Part of: Victory Party

The Ayyıldız Movement (Turkish: Ayyıldız Hareketi; lit. "Star and Crescent Movement") is a Turkish far-right nationalist group that is the youth wing of the Victory Party.

== History ==
On May 19, 2021, in Anitkabir, Ümit Özdağ made the following statement:

"We're continuing on with our visits throughout the country. Today, we are in Eskişehir, and our trips will pursue in the coming weeks. On August 26, we will officially establish our party. The name of our movement is the 'Ayyıldız Movement,' but we will announce the name of our party to the public, our esteemed nation, the great Turkish nation, on August 26. On the same day, we will also present the program of our party and the founding committee to the Turkish nation. The 'Ayyıldız Movement' is a party on Atatürk's path, embracing Turkish nationalists, patriots, those who adopt the philosophy of the War of Independence and the founding philosophy of the Republic of Turkey. We embrace the entire Turkish nation with love, friendship, and brotherhood. We will fight against those who robs this country and betray it."

In 2021, Ümit Özdağ established the Victory Party and the Ayyıldız Movement became its youth wing.

The first chairman of the Ayyıldız Movement, Gökşen Ulukuş, became the advisor to Kemal Kılıçdaroğlu in 2023. Ulukuş gained fame in 2020 when he excessively insulted a politician who posted the Kurdish flag on Twitter.

The Ayyıldız Movement often stages rallies and protests against Arab migrants and refugees in Turkey. In May 2023, members of the Ayyıldız Movement physically attacked members of the Free Cause Party who were running a stand in Trabzon.
