= 2024 anti-refugee riots in Turkey =

Anti-Syrian riots across Turkey

2024 Turkish riots
- Date: 30 June 2024 – 2 July 2024
- Location: Various Turkish cities, predominantly Kayseri
- Caused by: Anti-Syrian sentiment

Parties
Turkish protestors	Syrian refugees in Turkey	Turkish Police

Casualties
- Death: 1
- Injuries: 120+
- Detained: 474

In early July 2024, Turkey experienced a surge of anti-Syrian riots driven by anti-refugee sentiment. Caused by the molestation of a young girl, riots began in Kayseri, and spread across Turkey.

== Background ==
Turkey has the most refugees of any country in the world. The largest population is the Syrian refugees, with more than 3.6 million registered refugees, according to the United Nations High Commissioner for Refugees in the country. Kayseri itself has around 83,000. There is a fair amount of xenophobia against the Syrians, with a 2024 survey by the UNCHR finding that 77% of respondents in Turkey supported closing the border to refugees, the highest in the world.

== Events ==
After rumors of a Syrian refugee sexually assaulting a seven-year-old Syrian girl, (later revealed to be his own cousin) spread on social media, the city of Kayseri erupted into violence.

The protests spread to other areas such as Istanbul, Hatay, Adana, Urfa, Bursa, Gaziantep, Konya, İzmir, and Antalya. Protestors waved Turkish flags and made the wolf salute in the streets. Slogans of the protest included "Erdoğan, resign!" and "I do not want refugees in my country."

Dozens of properties and vehicles of Syrians were burnt. Fourteen police officers and one firefighter were among those injured in the riots.

At a restaurant in Maslak, a Turkish man holding a knife approached a table of Saudi businessmen, including billionaires Khaled al-Fawzan and Ibrahim al-Hadithi, while making slicing motions and the wolf salute. He was later arrested.

A 15-year-old Syrian named Ahmed al-Naif died in hospital after being stabbed by three teenagers in Serik.

== Reactions ==
The police chief of Kayseri said about the incident “I assure you that every legal action, including deportation, will be taken against this individual and his family.” The Ministry of Family and Social Services said in an official statement that, “The child victim, their siblings and her mother have been placed under state protection following the necessary procedures at the police station. Our expert teams have initiated psychosocial support for the child and their family. We at the Ministry will actively follow the judicial process to ensure the perpetrator receives the maximum penalty.”

In response to the riots, president Recep Tayyip Erdoğan condemned the violence saying "Nothing can be achieved by fueling xenophobia and hatred of refugees in society". He also blamed the opposition for fueling xenophobia.

The riots ended up fueling violence in Syria itself, particularly in Aleppo, where protestors attacked Turkish military bases and took down Turkish flags.

On 20 January 2025, Ümit Özdağ, the leader of the Turkish far-right Victory Party, was arrested on charges of insulting President Erdoğan and inciting violence on social media during the riots.
