= Besim Dutlulu =

Turkish statesman (born 1979)

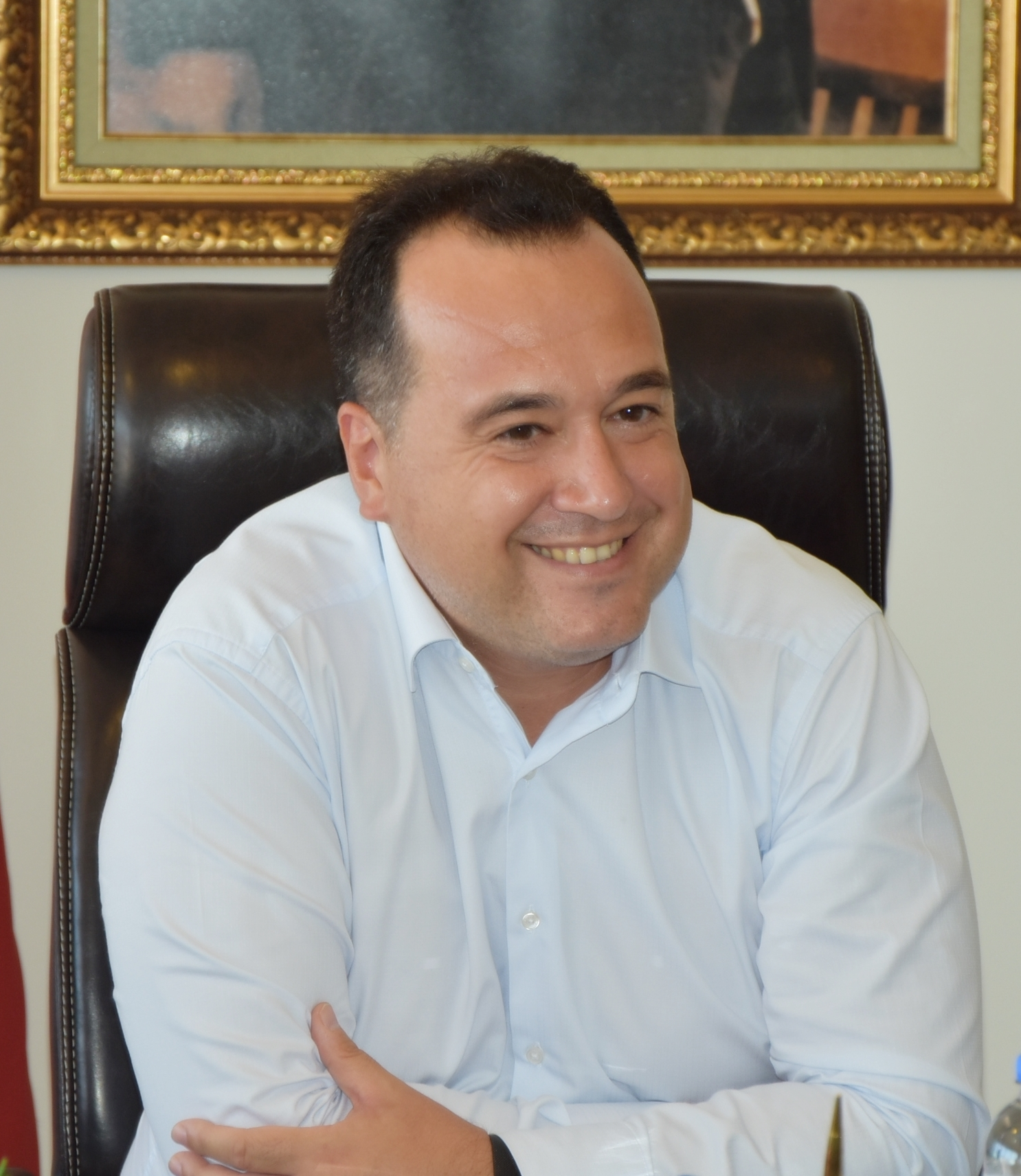

Mayor of Manisa Metropolitan Municipality
- Incumbent
- Assumed office 16 June 2025
- Preceded by: Ferdi Zeyrek

Mayor of Akhisar
- In office 4 April 2019 – 16 June 2025
- Preceded by: Salih Hızlı
- Succeeded by: Ekrem Kayserili

Personal details
- Born: September 28, 1979 (age 46) Akhisar, Manisa, Turkey
- Party: Republican People's Party (2014–present)
- Spouse: Özge Dutlulu (m. 2005)
- Children: 2
- Education: Ege University
- Occupation: Pharmacist; Politician
- Website: besimdutlulu.com

Besim Dutlulu (born 28 September 1979; Akhisar) is a Turkish politician and pharmacist who has been serving as the Mayor of Manisa Metropolitan Municipality since 2025. After completing his pharmacy education at Ege University, Dutlulu opened his own pharmacy in Akhisar in 2005 and held various positions in the Manisa Chamber of Pharmacists and several cooperatives. He joined the Republican People's Party (CHP) in 2014 and was elected Mayor of Akhisar in the 2019 Turkish local elections with 55.41% of the vote as the candidate of CHP and the Nation Alliance. He was re-elected in the 2024 Turkish local elections, serving a second term.

While serving as Mayor of Akhisar, following the death of Manisa Metropolitan Mayor Ferdi Zeyrek, Dutlulu was elected Mayor of Manisa Metropolitan Municipality by the Manisa Metropolitan Municipal Council on 16 June 2025. He received 85 out of 87 votes as the CHP nominee.

== Life and career ==
Besim Dutlulu was born on 28 September 1979 in the district of Akhisar in Manisa. Both of his parents are pharmacists. His father, Ahmet Dutlulu, served as Mayor of Akhisar between 1994 and 1999 representing the True Path Party. He completed his primary education at Misak-ı Milli Primary School in Akhisar and continued his secondary and high school education as a boarding student at İzmir Turkish Private College. He obtained his bachelor's degree in pharmacy from the Faculty of Pharmacy at Ege University.

After completing his university education, Dutlulu began practicing as a pharmacist in Akhisar. In 2005, he opened his own pharmacy. On 18 June 2005, he married Özge Dutlulu, who is also a pharmacist. He served for approximately ten years in the Akhisar district representation of the Manisa Chamber of Pharmacists and held the position of district representative for one term.

=== Political career ===
Besim Dutlulu joined the Republican People's Party in 2014. On 24 October 2018, he announced his candidacy for mayor from CHP for the 2019 Turkish local elections. Due to multiple candidates within CHP, a primary election was held in Akhisar on 2 December 2018. Following the primary, Dutlulu became CHP's official candidate for Mayor of Akhisar.

=== Mayor of Akhisar ===
In the 2019 Turkish local elections held on 31 March 2019, Dutlulu ran as the candidate of the Nation Alliance and won the election with 55.41% of the vote (61,001 votes), becoming Mayor of Akhisar.

During his term, the municipality implemented various services including budget management, social assistance programs, student scholarship schemes, infrastructure renewal, and green space projects. Social initiatives introduced during his tenure included a municipal soup kitchen, free public Wi-Fi access points, the “Grocery Card” social aid program, milk distribution for children, neighborhood daycare centers, and home-care services. He also organized regular neighborhood meetings and public forums to engage directly with residents. Projects supporting agricultural cooperatives, women producers, and rural development were also carried out.

In the 2024 Turkish local elections held on 31 March 2024, Dutlulu was re-elected as Mayor of Akhisar and served in this position until 16 June 2025.

=== Mayor of Manisa Metropolitan Municipality ===
Following the death of Ferdi Zeyrek on 9 June 2025, the Manisa Metropolitan Municipal Council convened on 16 June 2025 to elect a new mayor. Dutlulu, nominated by the Republican People's Party, was elected Mayor of Manisa Metropolitan Municipality by receiving 85 of the 87 votes cast. Prior to the election, the Justice and Development Party (AKP) Manisa Provincial Chairman Süleyman Turgut announced that his party would not nominate a candidate.
