= Cezmi Polat =

Turkish politician (born 1955)

General Secretary of the Victory Party
- Incumbent
- Assumed office December 3, 2021
- Preceded by: İsmail Koncuk

Member of the Grand National Assembly of Turkey
- Constituency: 1999 – Erzurum

Personal details
- Born: January 1, 1955 (age 71) Erzurum
- Party: Nationalist Movement Party (until 2017); İYİ Party (2017-2019); Victory Party (2021-present)
- Education: Erzurum Atatürk University

Cezmi Polat (born 1955, Erzurum) is a Turkish politician and General contractor.

He graduated from the Department of Business Administration, Faculty of Economics and Administrative Sciences, Atatürk University. He has served as a council member of Erzurum Municipality, board member of the Erzurum Development Foundation and the Eastern Anatolia Region Industrialists and Businessmen Association, and chairman of the Erzurum branch of the All Construction Contractors Employers' Union. He was a deputy for Erzurum from the Nationalist Movement Party (MHP) during the 21st term of the Grand National Assembly of Turkey. He was a founding member of the İYİ Party and resigned from the party in 2019. He is among the founders of the Victory Party and has served as the vice president responsible for local governments and is currently the party's general secretary. He is married and has two children.
