= Menzil, Kahta =

Menzil
- Village
- Location within Turkey
- Coordinates: 37.767°N 38.763°E
- Country: Turkey
- Province: Adıyaman
- District: Kâhta
- Population (2021): 2,318
- Time zone: UTC+3 (TRT)

Menzil (formerly Durak, Kurdish: Menzîl) is a village in the Kâhta District, Adıyaman Province, Turkey. The village is populated by Kurds of the Kawan tribe and had a population of 2,318 in 2021.

The Menzil Community is named after this village.
