= Necdet Mahfi Ayral =

Turkish actor

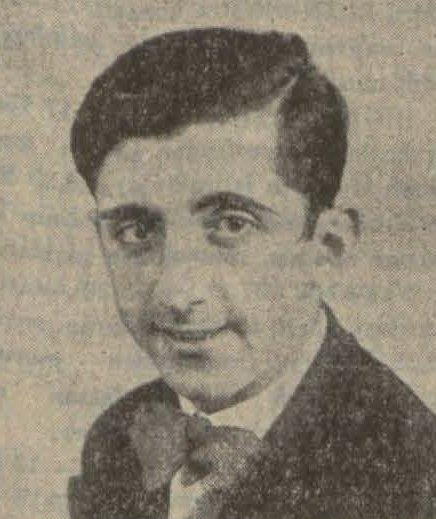
Necdet Mahfi Ayral.

Necdet Mahfi Ayral (August 6, 1908, in Istanbul – June 6, 2004, in Istanbul) was a well-known Turkish stage and cinema actor, as well as theatre director. While alive, he held the record for being the oldest Turkish actor who was still active. He is father of actress and well-known voice-over artist Jeyan Mahfi Tözüm.

== Filmography ==
- 1929 - Kaçakçılar
- 1933 - Söz Bir Allah Bir
- 1933 - Cici Berber
- 1933 - Fena Yol (O Kakos Dhromos)
- 1933 - Söz Bir Allah Bir
- 1934 - Milyon Avcıları
- 1939 - Allah'ın Cenneti
- 1940 - Akasya Palas
- 1940 - Yılmaz Ali
- 1940 - Şehvet Kurbanı
- 1945 - Hürriyet Apartmanı
- 1946 - Domaniç Yolcusu / Unutulan Sır
- 1949 - Efsuncu Baba
- 1950 - Akdeniz Korsanları
- 1951 - İstanbul Kan Ağlarken
- 1951 - Kızıl Tuğ Cengiz Han
- 1951 - Vatan ve Namık Kemal
- 1952 - Adak Tepe
- 1952 - Edi İle Büdü Tiyatrocu
- 1953 - Soygun
- 1955 - Kadının Fendi
- 1955 - Sihirli Boru
- 1961 - Naylon Leyla
- 1961 - Sahte Prens
- 1965 - Hep O Şarkı
- 1966 - Koca Yusuf
- 1968 - Vatan ve Namık Kemal
- 1977 - Gülünüz Güldürünüz
- 1996 - Eşkıya
- 1997 - Hamam
- 1997 - Mektup
- 2000 - Canlı Hayat
