= Menzil community =

Sufi group from Turkey

Founder
- Abdulhakim Erol

Regions with significant populations
- Turkey

Religions
- Islam

Scriptures
- Quran

Languages
- Turkish

Related ethnic groups
- Naqshbandi-Khalidi Sufi order

The Menzil community (Turkish: Menzil cemaati) is a branch of the Naqshbandiyya-Khalidiyya Sufi order originating in Adıyaman, Turkey. It is named after the village of Menzil in Adıyaman. The movement was founded by Mehmet Raşit Erol, who was noted for his support of the government during the 1980 Turkish coup d'état.

Menzil has become one of the largest religious orders in Turkey, attracting followers from diverse backgrounds. Its growth has been attributed in part to claims and rumors that individuals visiting the community's center were able to overcome negative habits after seeking guidance from the sheikh.

The Menzil community had gradually developed a complex organizational structure encompassing charitable foundations, educational initiatives, and a wide network of affiliated associations. The community is also alleged to be involved in politics, healthcare and bureaucracy.

== History ==
The community was reportedly founded by Abdulhakim Erol (1902-1972), who originally lived in Baykan, Siirt. The Erol family left their village in Siirt due to Turkish-Kurdish conflict and bought Menzil village in 1971, moving there. In the 1970s, various people around Turkey began to visit the village and Abdulhakim Erol. After his death, his son Muhammed Raşit Erol took his position. Muhammed Raşit was forcibly sent to reside in Gökçeada by the military junta in 1983. His brother Abdulbaki Erol became the leader of the group in 1993, after Muhammed Raşit's death.

Following the 1980 military coup, the Menzil Community experienced rapid growth, partly attributed to its reputation as a religious order supportive of the state and right-wing political parties. The community expanded its presence to cities such as Ankara and Istanbul. The community became widely known in the public opinion after the politicians such as Muhsin Yazıcıoğlu (former leader of the Great Union Party) and Ökkeş Kenger Şendiller (former leader of the Grey Wolves branch in Maraş) became followers of Muhammed Raşid Erol. Two former ministers of Turkey, Recep Akdağ and Taner Yıldız, were also alleged to be members of Menzil community. Such claims had been rejected by the official sources.

A splinter group (Buhara) had appeared within the community during the 2000s, led by Fevzettin Erol (one of the sons of Muhammed Raşit). The group has been centered in Buhara village of Sivrihisar.

The ongoing succession crisis since Abdülbaki Erol's death in 2023 has been widely reported in the media. Abdülbaki reportedly declared all of his three sons as his successors. The elder son of Abdülbaki, Muhammed Saki Erol, stated that the right to receive tawbahs (from the followers) were divided between all three sons.

However, according to the press and social media the sons have had disagreements; and therefore three different cliques were formed around the sons. Muhammed Mübarek and Muhammed Fettah reportedly act together and controlled the Semerkand Foundation (Semerkand Vakfı) which had been split into the Buhara Foundation (Buhara Vakfı) and the Gucdevan Foundation (Gucdevan Vakfı), respectively. Muhammed Saki controls the Serhendi Foundation (Serhendi Vakfı). Another implication of the situation was reported to be leading into disagreements about the ownership and usage rights of common amenities, buildings, and land lots. There had been protests in Manisa, Uşak and Afyonkarahisar regarding the issues.

== Leaders ==
- Mehmet Raşit Erol - founder
- Abdulhakim Erol
- Muhammed Raşid Erol (? - 22 October 1993)
- Abdulbaki Erol (22 October 1993 - 12 July 2023)
- Muhammed Saki Erol (12 July 2023 - present) Serhendi group
- Muhammed Mübarek Erol (12 July 2023 - present) Semerkand group
- Muhammed Fettah Erol (12 July 2023 - present) Semerkand group
