= Jeyan Mahfi Tözüm =

Turkish actress (1928–2023)

Fatma Tözüm
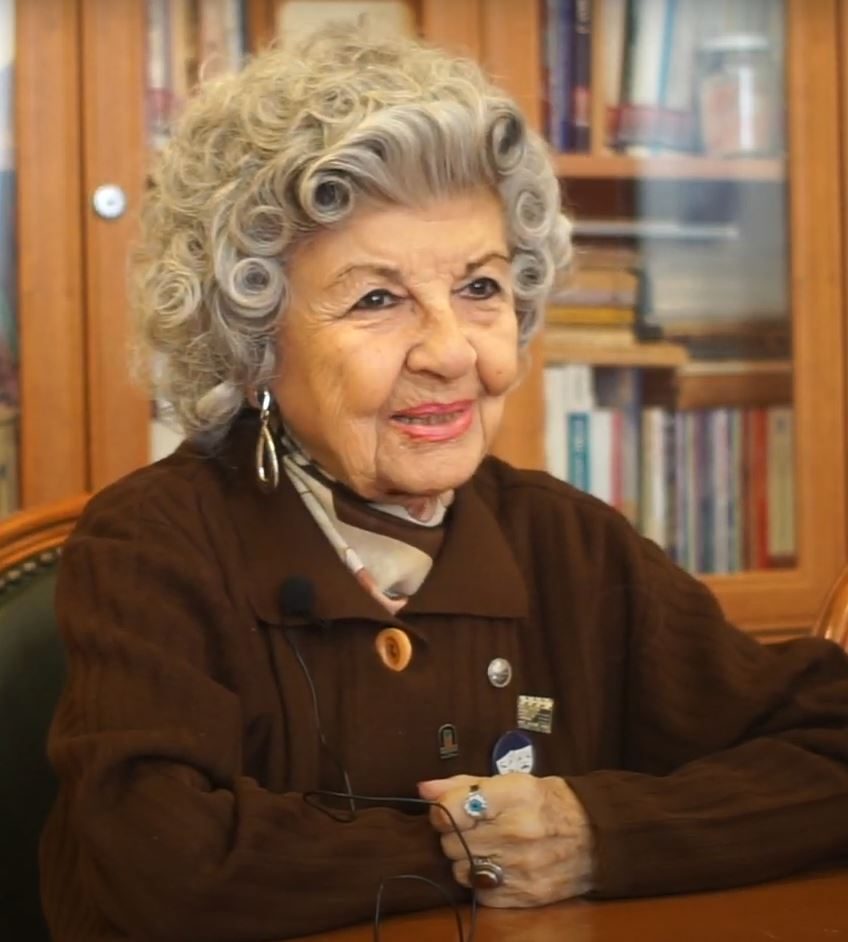
- Tözüm in 2020
- Born: Fatma Mesanet Jeyan Mahfi Ayral; 6 August 1928; Istanbul, Turkey
- Died: 29 October 2023 (aged 95); Istanbul, Turkey
- Resting place: Zincirlikuyu Cemetery
- Education: Beşiktaş Atatürk Anatolian High School
- Occupations: Actress; voice actress
- Years active: 1931–2018
- Spouse: Rauf Tözüm (m. 1954; died 1978)
- Father: Necdet Mahfi Ayral

Fatma Mesanet Jeyan Mahfi Ayral Tözüm (6 August 1928 – 29 October 2023) was a Turkish actress and voice artist.

== Life and career ==
Jeyan was born on 6 August 1928 in Istanbul. She started her artistic career with the encouragement of her father, Necdet Mahfi Ayral, when she was only three years old, by being cast by Muhsin Ertuğrul in the play Peer Gynt, a work of Henrik Ibsen. At Istanbul City Theatres; she acted in many plays such as Happy Days, Dressing the Nude, Roots, Half and Kezban and retired from there.

Tözüm started dubbing at the age of 10 with the voice of the TV show Happy Days. She has voiced many actresses such as Belgin Doruk, Türkan Şoray, Filiz Akın, Hülya Koçyiğit, Fatma Girik, Müjde Ar, Hale Soygazi, Emel Sayın, Gülşen Bubikoğlu, Ahu Tuğba and Hülya Avşar. She decided to leave the cinema with her husband in 1954 and devoted herself to theater plays and dubbing for many years. She also worked as a radio commercial speaker for 3 years. In addition to theater, she acted in movies and television series.

In 2005, she was awarded Bilge Olgaç Achievement Award at the 8th Flying Broom International Women's Film Festival.

== Personal life and death ==
Jeyan Mahfi Tözüm was married to composer Rauf Tözüm, who died in a traffic collision in 1978.

Tözüm died on 29 October 2023, at the age of 95. She was buried at Zincirlikuyu Cemetery.

== Filmography ==
- 1939: Allahın Cenneti
- 1947: Gençlik Günahı
- 1947: Seven Ne Yapmaz
- 1949: Efsuncu Baba
- 1949: Uçuruma Doğru
- 1953: Beklenen Şarkı
- 1954: Bozkurt Obası
- 1972: Falcı
- 1996: Gurbetçiler
- 1996: Şehnaz Tango
- 2000: Dadı
- 2001: Tatlı Hayat
- 2002: Ekmek Teknesi
- 2004: Sahra
- 2004: Yadigar
- 2005: Belalı Baldız
- 2006: Yaprak Dökümü
- 2006: Hayırdır İnşallah
- 2007: Hayat Apartmanı
- 2010: Çığlık Çığlığa Bir Sevda
- 2014: Deliha
- 2018: Deliha 2
