= Yusuf Ziya Bahadınlı =

Turkish politician (1927–2025)

Member of the Grand National Assembly of Turkey for Yozgat
- In office 22 October 1965 – 12 October 1969

Personal details
- Born: 9 September 1927; Bahadın, Turkey
- Died: 19 May 2025 (aged 97)
- Resting place: Karacaahmet Cemetery, İstanbul
- Political party: TİP
- Education: Gazi Eğitim Enstitüsü
- Occupation: Writer

Yusuf Ziya Bahadınlı (9 September 1927 – 19 May 2025) was a Turkish politician. A member of the Workers' Party of Turkey (TİP), he served in the Grand National Assembly from 1965 to 1969.

Bahadınlı died on 19 May 2025, at the age of 97. At the time of his death, he was the last surviving TİP Member of Parliament who was elected in the 1965 Turkish general election. He was buried at Karacaahmet Cemetery.
