= 2025 Metina cave poisonings =

Death of Turkish soldiers in Iraqi Kurdistan

- Part of Kurdistan Workers' Party insurgency
- Location: Metina, Iraqi Kurdistan
- Date: July 6–7, 2025
- Attack type: Natural methane gas poisoning
- Deaths: 12
- Injuries: 7
- Victim: (Turkey) Turkish Armed Forces

The 2025 Metina cave poisonings occurred on 6–7 July 2025, when twelve Turkish soldiers died from methane gas exposure in a cave in the Metina region of Iraqi Kurdistan, as they were searching for the body of a Turkish soldier who was killed in the area by the PKK during Operation Claw-Lock in 2022.

== Background ==
During Operation Claw‑Lock in 2022, a Turkish soldier was killed by the PKK in the area around Metina. His body was never found, and the Turkish Armed Forces began a search mission in July 2025 to retrieve it.

== Incident ==
On 6 July 2025, a Turkish military unit of nineteen soldiers entered a mountain cave at an altitude of approximately 852 metres (932 yd) in the Metina region. The cave was previously used by the PKK as a field hospital. In the cave, five soldiers died due to exposure to methane gas. On the next day, seven more soldiers died due to the effects of the gas, bringing the total number of fatalities to twelve. Seven others were hospitalized with severe injuries.

== Cause ==
According to the Turkish Ministry of Defence, the soldiers died due to methane gas inhalation in the confined cave. Methane is a colorless, odorless gas that displaces oxygen and can cause asphyxiation in high concentrations. The ministry stated there was no evidence of sabotage or chemical weapons use.

== Reactions ==
President Recep Tayyip Erdoğan and Defence Minister Yaşar Güler expressed condolences through a post online.

Pakistan's Foreign Office also issued a statement expressing that "Pakistan stands in firm solidarity with brotherly Turkiye in this moment of grief."

Opposition parties and military experts in Turkey criticized the lack of gas-detection equipment and the absence of unmanned reconnaissance tools, urging an investigation into safety protocols.
