= Zilan Tigris =

Turkish singer (1972–2023)

- Born: 1972; Diyarbakır, Turkey
- Died: 6 February 2023 (aged 50–51) Diyarbakır, Turkey
- Genres: Folk
- Occupation: Singer

Zilan Tigris (Armenian: Զիլան Տիգրիս, 1972 – 6 February 2023) was a Turkish singer.

== Biography ==
Zilan Tigris was born in Diyarbakır, where she received her primary, secondary and higher education. Both her mother and father were ethnic Armenians. The singer's maternal grandmother lost her entire family during the Armenian Genocide, only one sister survived. Her grandmother was adopted by a colonel, and her grandmother's sister was sold in the market.

== Career ==
Tigris was engaged in music for about three decades. She released two albums in 1992 and 1998, which consist only of Kurdish songs. In 1989, she created the first children's choir in Diyarbakır, and in 2005, she created the first women's choir in the city. In 2015, Tigris participated in the program "Ari Tun" organized by the Ministry of Diaspora, within the framework of which she visited Armenia. She sang in Kurdish, Turkish and Armenian.

== Personal life ==
Tigris was married to actor Çağdaş Çankaya and had an adopted son named Arat Barış.

== Death ==
On 6 February 2023, the 2023 Turkey–Syria earthquake took place with a magnitude of 7.8 occurred in the southwest of Turkey, including Diyarbakır in which it was affected. The following day, it became known that Tigris was also under the rubble. Two days later, on 9 February, the dead bodies of Tigris and her husband Çankaya were pulled out from the rubble. She was interred at Yeniköy Cemetery in Diyarbakır.
