= Riza Akpolat =

Turkish politician and former mayor of Beşiktaş

Rıza Akpolat

6th Mayor of Beşiktaş
- In office 31 March 2019 – 17 January 2025
- Preceded by: Tahir Doğaç (acting)
- Succeeded by: Rasim Şişman (acting)

Personal details
- Born: November 11, 1982 (age 43) Bahçelievler, Istanbul, Turkey
- Party: Republican People's Party (CHP) (2006–present)
- Spouse: Derya Akpolat (m. 2022, divorced) Yeşim Yankılıç (m. 2024)
- Children: 2
- Education: Sakarya University

Ali Rıza Akpolat (born 11 November 1982) is a Turkish politician who served as the Mayor of Beşiktaş from 2019 to 2025. He is a member of the Republican People's Party (CHP).

== Political career ==
Rıza Akpolat was born in Bahçelievler, Istanbul in 1982. He graduated from the Faculty of Economics and Administrative Sciences at Sakarya University in 2004.

Akpolat joined the youth branch of the CHP in 2006 and held various roles in the Bahçelievler district branch until 2015. He was a parliamentary candidate from Istanbul’s 3rd electoral district in the 2015 general elections (June and November) but was not elected.

He was elected Mayor of Beşiktaş in the 2019 local elections with 73% of the vote. He was re-elected in the 2024 local elections with 64.12% of the vote.

== Investigation and arrest ==
On 13 January 2025, Akpolat was detained in connection with a bribery investigation targeting municipal officials and contractors in Istanbul. He was formally arrested along with 22 others, including municipal executives, on 17 January 2025.

Following his arrest, the Turkish Ministry of the Interior suspended Akpolat from office as a precautionary measure. Ömer Rasim Şişman was later elected as acting mayor by the Beşiktaş Municipal Council on 23 January 2025.

== Personal life ==
Akpolat is of Alevi Zaza origin and hails from the village of Bulanık in Üzümlü, Erzincan Province. He has two daughters from his first marriage to Derya Akpolat. In July 2024, he married Yeşim Yankılıç, the former Istanbul chairwoman of the CHP women’s branch.
