= Ferdi Zeyrek =

Turkish politician (1977–2025)

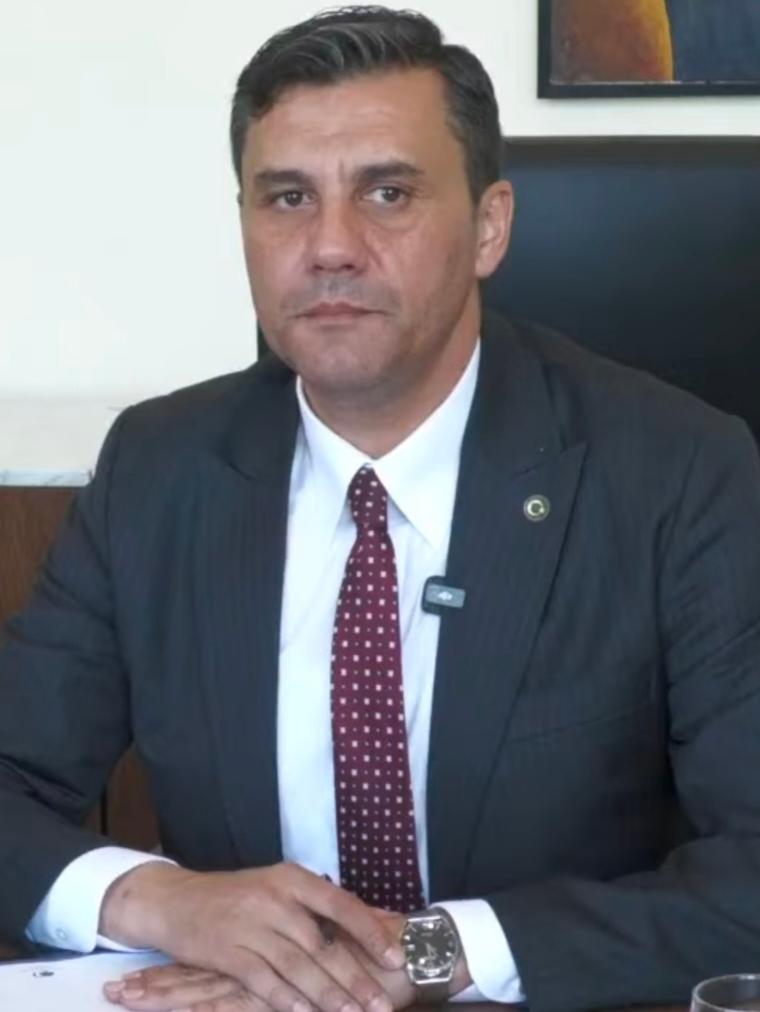
- Zeyrek in 2025

Mayor of Manisa
- In office 3 April 2024 – 9 June 2025
- Preceded by: Cengiz Ergün
- Succeeded by: Besim Dutlulu

President of Union of Municipalities of Aegean
- In office 6 June 2024 – 9 June 2025
- Preceded by: Tunç Soyer
- Succeeded by: Bülent Nuri Çavuşoğlu

President of CHP Manisa Provincial
- In office 24 September 2023 – 1 December 2023
- Preceded by: Ali Kuyumcu
- Succeeded by: İlksen Özalper

Personal details
- Born: 16 March 1977 Manisa, Turkey
- Died: 9 June 2025 (aged 48) Yunusemre, Manisa, Turkey
- Party: Republican People's Party (2018–2025)
- Spouse: Nurcan Zeyrek (m. 2003)
- Children: 3
- Education: Bursa Uludağ University
- Occupation: Architect, politician
- Website: www.ferdizeyrek.com
- Nickname(s): Manisa'nın Efe'si; Ferdi Başkan

Ferdi Zeyrek (Turkish pronunciation: [fæɾˈdi ˈze̞jrek]; 16 March 1977 – 9 June 2025) was a Turkish architect and politician. He served as the mayor of Manisa between 2024 and 2025.

== Early life, education and career ==
Zeyrek was born in Manisa on 16 March 1977. After completing his primary and secondary education in Manisa, he graduated from the Faculty of Architecture of Bursa Uludağ University. Zeyrek founded his own interior architecture company. He served as the president of Manisa Architects' Chamber for seven years. Zeyrek was on the board of management of Manisaspor between 2012 and 2014.

== Political career ==
Zeyrek served as a councillor in Manisa Metropolitan Municipality and Şehzadeler Municipality. He became a candidate for the mayorship nomination from the Republican People's Party for 2019 Turkish local elections, but was not nominated. He became Manisa provincial head of the CHP in 2023. He was elected from CHP as the Mayor of Manisa Metropolitan Municipality in the 2024 local elections. This election was the first time that the CHP had won Manisa in a local election in 74 years.

== Personal life and death ==
Zeyrek was married to Nurcan Zeyrek from 2003. He was survived by his wife and three daughters.

On 6 June 2025, while at home, Zeyrek sustained an electric shock on the stairs that lead to the machine room of the swimming pool. He was taken to Manisa Celal Bayar University Hafsa Sultan Hospital, where he was admitted to intensive care. Zeyrek died of his injuries three days later, at the age of 48.

According to his daughter, Nehir, the electrocution was caused by negligence. The house was supposed to have two residual current devices, but instead, it had only one and that one was faulty. According to her, her father had talked to the responsible plumber on the day before the accident about the suspicions that something was not right, and the plumber had stated that everything was right.
