= Joakim Medin =

Swedish journalist and writer (born 1984)

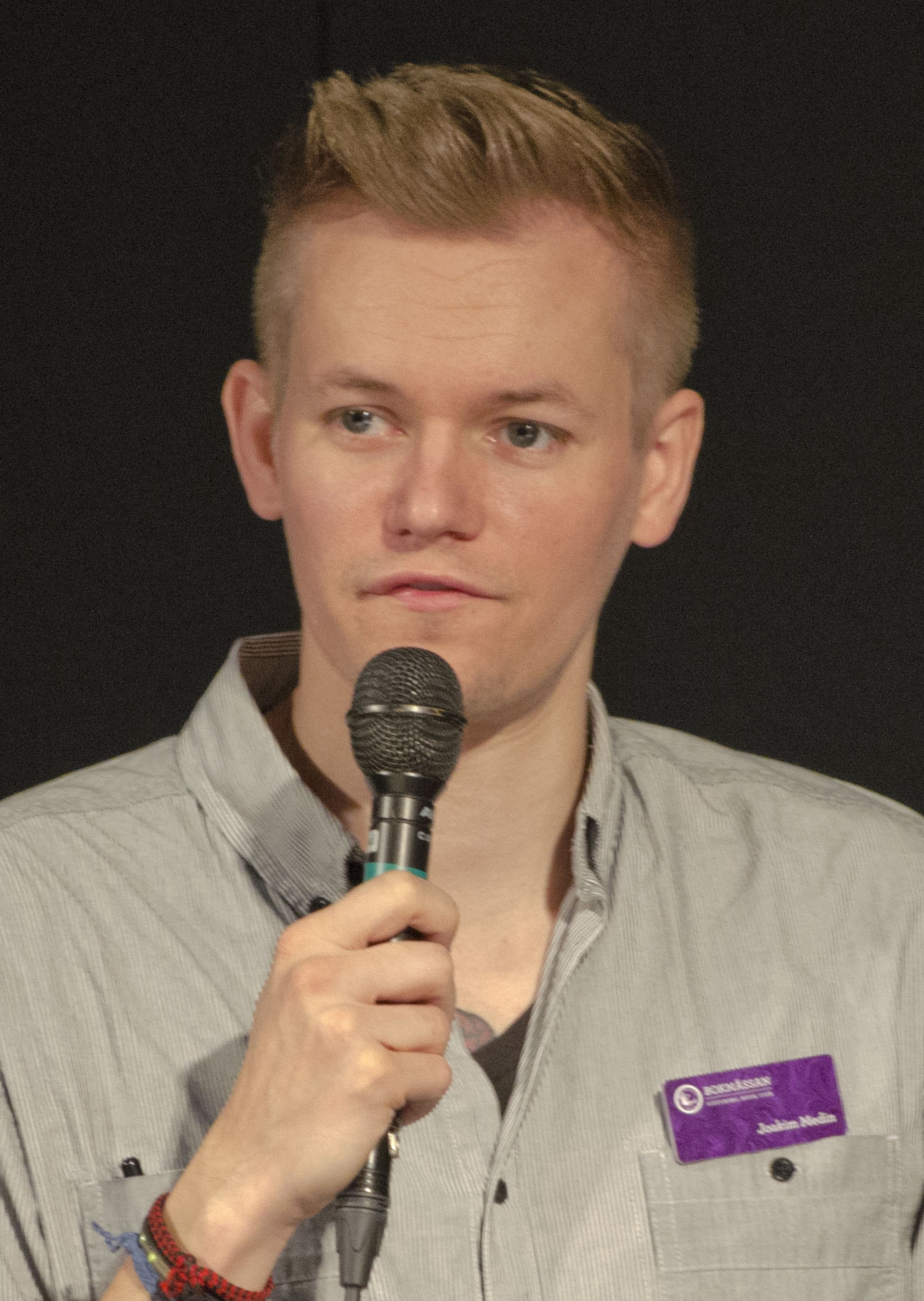
- Medin in 2016
- Born: Kaj Joakim Medin; 1984 (age 41–42); Mölndal, Sweden
- Education: Uppsala University
- Occupations: Writer; journalist
- Years active: 2009–present
- Spouse: Sofie Axelsson
- Children: 1

Kaj Joakim Medin (born 1984) is a Swedish journalist and writer.

== Early life ==
He was born in 1984 in Mölndal. He has a sister and a brother. He worked as a history and social studies teacher for two years at Westerlundska Gymnasium in Enköping.

== Career ==
His first job in journalism was covering the 2009 Honduran coup d'état for a Guatemalan newspaper. He studied journalism at Uppsala University.

In 2016, Medin wrote the book Kobane: den kurdiska revolutionen och kampen mot IS (translation: "Kobani: The Kurdish revolution and the battle against IS"), which was based on his travels to Syria as a journalist, where he met Kurds trying to establish Rojava after having defeated ISIS attempting to establish a caliphate in the region.

His fifth book Amanda – Min dotters resa till IS (translation: "Amanda - My daughter's journey to IS") was published in 2022 and co-written with Patricio Galvez. The book tells about Galvez' daughter Amanda Gonzalez who converted to Islam as a teenager, was then radicalised and married Michael Skråmo. In 2014, the couple and their children travelled to the ISIS caliphate in Syria where both were subsequently killed in 2019.

=== Imprisonment in Syria ===
Working as a freelance journalist he has reported on the treatment of Kurds in Syria. While working there he and his interpreter were jailed for a week.

In February 2022, Medin was in Kyiv and reported on the first week of Russia's invasion of Ukraine. Later that same year he was awarded the Uppsala Medal of Honor.

=== Imprisonment in Turkey ===
On 27 March 2025, Medin was arrested when arriving in Turkey where he was supposed to report on the ongoing protests for the newspaper ETC. A day later, Medin's editor-in-chief at ETC confirmed his arrest, and that he was being charged with "insulting the president" and "membership of a terrorist organisation". This was also confirmed by prosecutors in Ankara.

His arrest stems from his alleged involvement in a protest against Turkish president Recep Tayyip Erdoğan in Stockholm in 2023 were an effigy of Erdogan was hanged outside Stockholm Town Hall. On 23 April, he was officially charged with insulting the President, and terrorism. The trial in Ankara was attended by Swedish parliamentarians Jonas Sjöstedt of the Left Party and Ulrika Westerlund from the Green Party. He was convicted on the insult charges and sentenced to a suspended 11-month prison term. He remained detained at Marmara Prison pending a verdict on his terrorism case. He was released on 16 May 2025 and returned to Sweden the same day.

== Personal life ==
His wife, Sofie Axelsson, is also a journalist. They have a daughter.

== Bibliography ==
- Kobane: den kurdiska revolutionen och kampen mot IS. Stockholm: Leopard förlag. 2016. ISBN 9789173436250
- Orbánistan: rädsla och avsky i det illiberala Ungern. Stockholm: Verbal. 2018. Libris 22422690. ISBN 9789187777370
- Thailandssvenskarna. Stockholm: Verbal. 2019. ISBN 9789187777752
- Samhällsbärarna. Stockholm: Unizon. 2021. ISBN 978-91-519-8816-0
- Amanda – Min dotters resa till IS. Stockholm: Verbal. 2022. ISBN 978-91-89155-81-7
- Samhällsbärarna. Stockholm: Unizon. 2021. ISBN 978-91-519-8816-0
- Kurdspåret. Sverige, Turkiet och priset för ett Natomedlemskap. Stockholm: Verbal. 2023. ISBN 978-91-89524-38-5
- Fängslad av Erdoğan. Stockholm: Albert Bonniers Förlag. 2026. ISBN 9789100812829
