= Abdulbaki Erol =

Turkish Islamic scholar and religious leader (1949–2023)

Şex Abdulbaki Erol

Leader of the Menzil community
- In office 22 October 1993 – 12 July 2023
- Preceded by: Muhammed Raşid Erol (disputed)

Personal life
- Born: 2 May 1949 Ormanpınar, Turkey
- Died: 12 July 2023 (aged 74) Kurtköy, Pendik, Istanbul, Turkey
- Resting place: (Turkish: Menzil Köyü Markad-ı Şerif)
- Parent: Abdulhakim Erol (father)
- Occupation: Religious Leader, Sheikh, Scholar

Religious life
- Religion: Islam
- Tariqa: Naqshbandi

Abdulbaki Erol (2 May 1949 – 12 July 2023) was a Sufi Islamic scholar and the sheikh (Kurmanji Kurdish: Şex, lit. 'leader') of the Menzil community, which is one of the largest religious organizations in Turkey. He was born in Siirt. He received his initial education in Arabic and religious sciences at his father's madrasah in their village of Menzil. Subsequently, he pursued further studies in Siirt and Van.

Abdulbaki Erol's father was Abdulhakim Erol. After his father's death, his brother Muhammed Raşid Erol became the leader of the Menzil community. Abdulbaki Erol assumed leadership of the Menzil community following the death of his brother on 22 October 1993.

== Death ==
Şex Abdulbaki Erol died on 12 July 2023, at the age of 74. At the time he had been undergoing treatment for kidney failure at a private hospital in Kurtköy, Pendik. His funeral was conducted in Menzil village, Adıyaman, and was attended by 250,000 people.

President Recep Tayyip Erdoğan expressed his condolences, stating: "May divine mercy be bestowed upon Şex Abdulbaki Erol, a revered spiritual leader in our nation, who devoted his life to acquiring knowledge, spreading wisdom, and serving the Islamic faith. My heartfelt sympathies go out to his family, friends, and all those who benefited from his teachings. May his final abode be a place of eternal bliss."
