= Leyla Neyzi =

Turkish academic

Leyla Neyzi (born 29 July 1961) is a Turkish academic anthropologist and oral historian. She is particularly interested in the study of conflict-afflicted areas. She is employed at the Sabancı University, Istanbul, but in 2025 is the Leverhulme Trust Visiting Professor in the School of Humanities at the University of Glasgow.

== Biography ==
Leyla Neyzi was born in Istanbul, Turkey, the daughter of Ali H. Neyzi, a businessman and writer, and Olcay Neyzi, a pediatrician. After graduating from Robert College of Istanbul, she studied Anthropology at Stanford University (BA 1982) and Development Sociology at Cornell University (PhD 1991). Her doctorate was titled Beyond “Tradition” and “Resistance”: Kinship and Economic Development in Mediterranean Turkey, and won the Malcolm H. Kerr Dissertation Award. She worked as an assistant professor at Boğaziçi University, (1992–1994) and as the Oral History Project Director, Economic and Social History Foundation (1995–1996). She currently teaches Anthropology at Sabancı University. As of 2025 Neyzi is the Leverhulme Trust Visiting Professor in the School of Humanities at the University of Glasgow, where she lectures in memory studies and oral history. She has also been a visiting scholar at St Antony's College at the University of Oxford, where she taught in the South East European Studies course (Seesox).

Neyzi is particularly interested in the study of conflict-afflicted areas. Neyzi produced a notable series of studies based on the diaries of Yaşar Paker, who issued from the tiny Jewish community of early 20th century Ankara, and who was twice enrolled in the labor battalions in Turkey, the first time during the Greco-Turkish War (1919-1922) and the second time during the Second World War (in which Turkey did not take part). One of these studies was published in Jewish Social Studies in Fall 2005. Neyzi publishes in English and Turkish.

== Awards ==
- Malcolm H. Kerr Dissertation Award, Middle East Studies Association of North America, 1992.
- Research Award, Population Council Middle East Awards Program, 1998–1999 (Family History, Generation and Identity in Turkey).
- Research Award, Sabancı University, 2003–2004, (An Oral History of the Neighborhood of Teşvikiye).
- Visiting Scholar, Oxford University Programme on Contemporary Turkey and St. Antony's College, Senior Associate Member, 2004.
