= Berkin Usta =

Turkish alpine skier (2000–2025)

- Usta at the 2022 Winter Olympics

Personal information
- Born: 29 May 2000 Bursa, Turkey
- Died: 27 March 2025 (aged 24) Uludağ, Bursa, Turkey
- Occupation: Alpine skier

Sport

Skiing career
- Club: Bursa 16 Sports Club

Berkin Usta (29 May 2000 – 27 March 2025) was a Turkish alpine skier who competed at the 2022 Winter Olympics.

== Biography ==
Berkin Usta was born in Bursa, Turkey on 29 May 2000. His father Yahya was a national alpine skier. He began skiing at the age of two. He studied International Trade and Business at Istanbul Bilgi University.

Usta competed as an alpine skier, and was a member of Bursa 16 Sports Club. He participated in the grand slalom event of the 2017 European Youth Olympic Winter Festival in Erzurum, Turkey, and ranked 21st. He competed at the 2022 Winter Olympics in Beijing, China. He finished 43rd in the giant slalom and failing to finish in the slalom.

Usta died in a hotel fire at Mount Uludağ on 27 March 2025, at the age of 24. His father also died in the fire.

== See also ==
- Turkey at the 2017 European Youth Olympic Winter Festival
