= Gürkan Coşkun =

Turkish painter (1941–2022)

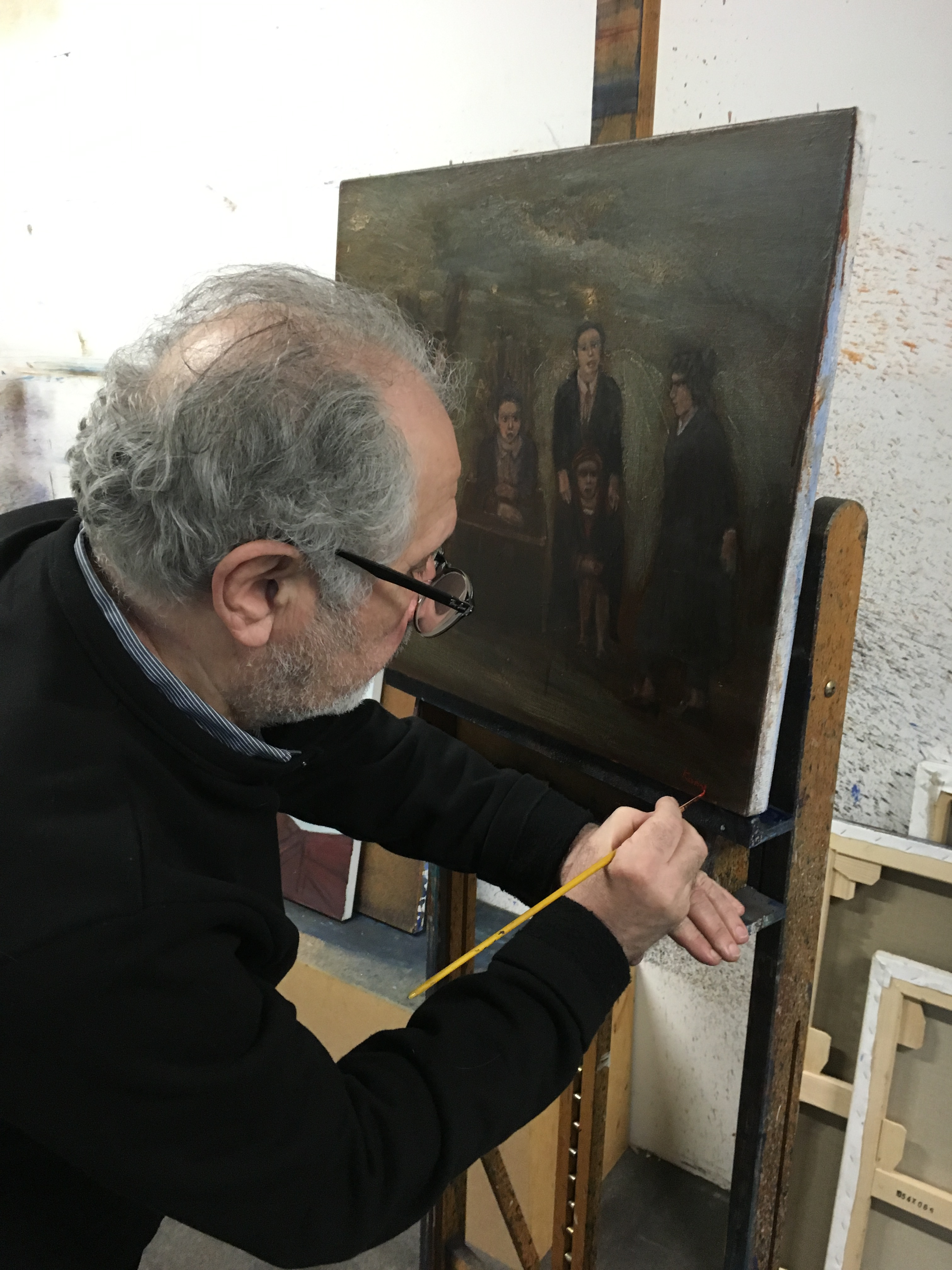
Coşkun with a painting

Gürkan Coşkun (1941 – 22 September 2022) or more widely known as Komet was a Turkish painter.

Coşkun was born in Çorum in 1941. After attending İstanbul State Academy of Fine Arts between the years 1960 and 1967, he moved to Paris in 1971. He split his time between the two cities. His work is exhibited in various countries and is very respected in his home town. In his paintings, he most often blended fantasy and reality.
