= Yusuf Kırkpınar =

Turkish politician (1949–2025)

Member of the Grand National Assembly of Turkey
- In office 18 April 1999 – 1 October 2002

Personal details
- Born: 1949; Aşkale, Turkey
- Died: 16 January 2025 (aged 75)
- Political party: MHP
- Education: Ege University (B.J.)
- Occupation: Journalist; Businessman

Yusuf Kırkpınar (1949 – 16 January 2025) was a Turkish politician. A member of the Nationalist Movement Party, he served in the Grand National Assembly from 1999 to 2002.

Kırkpınar died on 16 January 2025, at the age of 75.
