= Seda Fettahoğlu =

Turkish singer and actress (1979–2023)

- Born: 26 September 1979; Trabzon, Turkey
- Died: 27 September 2023 (aged 44); Beyoğlu, Istanbul, Turkey
- Occupation: Actress
- Years active: 2002–2023

Seda Fettahoğlu (26 September 1979 – 27 September 2023) was a Turkish actress.

== Life and career ==
Fettahoğlu was born on 26 September 1979 in Trabzon. After graduating from Trabzon Anatolian High School in 1997, she studied at Bilkent University, Faculty of Music and Performing Arts, Department of Theater and graduated from there in 2002. She was the cousin of actress Ayşe Tolga.

Fettahoğlu began her acting career in 2002, which continued until her death in 2023. She joined the Istanbul City Theaters in 2003 as a permanent actress. She took the stage in many theater plays such as Yer Demir Gök Bakır, A Midsummer Night's Dream and Keşanlı Ali Destanı etc.

Due to her command of English, she did dubbing work in foreign cinema and TV productions. Between 2003 and 2004, she presented the theater program "İyi Seyiirler" with Can Gürzap on Elmavision channel. In 2015, she took part in the team that trained the contestants in the television program Komedi Türkiye. In her acting career, she mainly appeared in TV series and commercials.

She is most remembered for her role as "Sultan", the mother-in-law of Havuç, in the TV series Çocuk Duymasın, which became a phenomenon of its time and was broadcast on ATV and Kanal D. At the same time; She appeared on the screens with productions such as My Magic Mother, Dolunay and Sular Durulmayan.

== Death ==
Fettahoğlu was found dead with a gunshot wound to the head in a park in Beyoğlu, Istanbul, on 27 September 2023. She was 44, and had lived with depression. Fettahoğlu was buried in the family cemetery in Domaçlı District of Doğancı village in Giresun's Tirebolu district.
