= Ali Boğa =

Turkish politician (1949–2025)

Member of the Grand National Assembly
- In office 28 June 2011 – 23 June 2015
- Constituency: Muğla (2011)

Personal details
- Born: 1949 Fethiye, Turkey
- Died: 15 August 2025 (aged 76) Fethiye, Turkey
- Party: AKP
- Education: Ankara University

Ali Boğa (1949 – 15 August 2025) was a Turkish politician. A member of the Justice and Development Party, he served in the Grand National Assembly from 2011 to 2015.

== Death ==
Boğa was killed after being struck by a vehicle in Fethiye, on 15 August 2025, at the age of 76.
