= Yavuz Bülent Bâkiler =

Turkish poet (1935 or 1936 – 2025)

Yavuz Bülent Bâkiler (1935 or 1936 – 28 September 2025) was a Turkish poet and writer.

== Life ==
Yavuz Bülent Bâkiler was of Azerbaijani Turkic origin. His ancestors migrated from the Karabakh region of Azerbaijan to Sivas, where he was born. He completed his primary and secondary education in Sivas, Gaziantep and Malatya. In 1960, he graduated from the Faculty of Law at Ankara University, after which he briefly worked at the newspaper Yeni İstanbul.

While serving as a rapporteur at the TRT Ankara Radio Program Department, he prepared and presented various cultural programs. Between 1969 and 1975, he practiced law in Sivas. He also served as the provincial head of the Justice Party and was nominated as both mayoral and parliamentary candidate.

From 1975 to 1976 he was legal adviser at the Prime Ministry Undersecretariat of Land and Agricultural Reform, and from 1976 to 1979 he worked at Ankara Television. In 1979–1980 he served as Deputy Undersecretary at the Ministry of Culture and Tourism. After the 1980 Turkish coup d'état, he was appointed as an adviser and continued in the ministry until 1992. He then worked for two years as an adviser to the Prime Ministry before retiring in 1994.

Bâkiler's first poem appeared in Türk Sanatı magazine in 1953. Later his poems were published in local magazines and newspapers. For many years he wrote columns for Tercüman and Türkiye. He resigned from Türkiye newspaper on 24 March 2013.

== Death ==
Bâkiler died on 28 September 2025, at the age of 89. After the funeral prayer at Marmara University Faculty of Theology, a ceremony was held at the Ay Yıldız Mosque in Sivas, and he was buried in the family cemetery at Yukarı Tekke Cemetery.
