= Eraslan Özkaya =

Turkish judge (1939–2025)

President of the Court of Cassation
- In office 19 June 2002 – 1 December 2004
- Preceded by: Sami Selçuk
- Succeeded by: Osman Arslan

Personal details
- Born: 1 December 1939; Hacıbektaş, Turkey
- Died: 4 April 2025 (aged 85)
- Education: Ankara University, Law School
- Occupation: Judge

Eraslan Özkaya (1 December 1939 – 4 April 2025) was a Turkish judge. He served as president of the Court of Cassation from 2002 to 2004.

Özkaya died on 4 April 2025, at the age of 85.
