= Olcay Neyzi =

Turkish doctor (1927–2022)

Remide Olcay Neyzi (27 July 1927 – 3 February 2022) was a Turkish doctor and the former Director of the Department of Pediatrics, Istanbul Faculty of Medicine (1979–1994). As the first author of the most comprehensive pediatric textbook in Turkish, she greatly contributed to improving the level of medical education in Turkey.

== Biography ==
Early life and education

Olcay Neyzi was born in Istanbul, Turkey, the daughter of Şükrü Ataman.

Neyzi graduated in 1946 from Robert College. She went on to study at the University of Michigan, where she earned a Bachelor of Science degree in Zoology after three years of study. She completed her medical degree at the Istanbul Faculty of Medicine in 1954. In 1950, she married Ali Halim Neyzi.

Neyzi specialized in Pediatrics and pursued postgraduate training at Massachusetts General Hospital in Boston (1956-1957), where she worked in the Pediatric Metabolism and Endocrinology Unit under the mentorship of Dr. Allan Macy Butler and Dr. John Douglas Crawford II.

Career

In 1960, Neyzi became an associate professor at the Istanbul Faculty of Medicine. In 1963, she received a scholarship from UNICEF to further her studies at the Institute of Child Health in London, where she participated in a three-week observational study in Africa. She also joined the Centre International de l’Enfance (International Children’s Centre) in Paris upon the invitation of British pediatrician James Tanner, known for the Tanner scale. In 1967, she became a full professor.

From 1979 to 1994, she was the Head of Department of Pediatrics at Istanbul Faculty of Medicine, as well as the Director of Institute of Child Health, University of Istanbul. During that time, Olcay Neyzi initiated the Woman and Child Research and Education Unit within the hospital area of the Istanbul Faculty of Medicine. She also initiated the Family Health Department with a multidisciplinary team within the Institute of Child Health at Istanbul University.

Contributions

Neyzi made significant contributions to pediatric endocrinology through the development of Turkish pediatric growth charts, which are still widely used in Turkey today. These growth charts, based on data from Turkish children, have become a crucial tool in assessing children’s growth and development in the country.

She is the author of many notable publications in the field of pediatrics. The Turkish medical textbook "Pediatri", first published in 1987, has been updated and republished in various editions, making it an essential resource for medical students and practitioners.

Olcay Neyzi was recognized for her outstanding contributions to pediatric endocrinology and child health, receiving several prestigious awards, including the Eczacıbaşı Medical Award of Honor in 2017, recognizing her significant contributions to pediatric endocrinology and child health in Turkey and internationally.

Olcay Neyzi published her autobiography, *Durmayalım Düşeriz – Bir Çocuk Doktorunun Not Defterinden* (2022), where she discusses her life and contributions to the field of pediatric medicine.

Neyzi died on 3 February 2022, at the age of 94. Her two children are Mehmet Ali Neyzi and Leyla Neyzi.
