= Victory Party (Turkey) =

Nationalist political party in Turkey

Victory Party Zafer Partisi
- Abbreviation: ZAFER (unofficial); ZP (unofficial)
- Leader: Ümit Özdağ
- Secretary-General: Cezmi Polat
- Spokesperson: Azmi Karamahmutoğlu
- Founder: Ümit Özdağ
- Founded: 26 August 2021
- Split from: Good Party
- Headquarters: Ankara, Turkey
- Youth wing: Ayyıldız Movement
- Membership (2026): ▲74,399
- Ideology: Anti-immigration; Kemalism; Pan-Turkism; Right-wing populism Ultranationalism
- Political position: Right-wing to far-right
- Colours: Red; White (National Colors); Grey (Customary)
- Slogan: Zafer Partisi Gelecek Sığınmacılar Gidecek! ("The Victory Party Will Come, The Refugees Will Go!"); Bilim, Birlik, Barış ("Science, Unity, Peace")
- Anthem: Kutlu Olsun ("May it be blessed")
- Grand National Assembly: 0 / 600
- Metropolitan municipalities: 0 / 30
- Provinces: 0 / 51
- District municipalities: 2 / 922
- Belde Municipalities: 0 / 388

Website
- zaferpartisi.org.tr

The Victory Party (Turkish: Zafer Partisi, ZP) is a right-wing to far-right, anti-immigrant, right-wing populist, ultranationalist political party in Turkey founded on 26 August 2021 under the leadership of Ümit Özdağ. The party was represented in the Grand National Assembly by a single MP, Özdağ himself, until it failed to pass the electoral threshold in the 2023 election and therefore was barred from any seats.

The Victory Party is the continuation of the Ayyıldız Movement (lit. 'Star and Crescent Movement') initiated by Ümit Özdağ, which became a youth movement after the establishment of the party. The founding petition of the party was submitted to the Ministry of the Interior on 26 August 2021 and then the party was officially established.

== History ==
The party was founded by Ümit Özdağ, due to his many disagreements with other Turkish parties, including corruption allegations, the demographic effects of the ruling AKP's refugee policies (which the Victory Party calls "strategic demographic engineering"), the "anti-democratic approaches" by the İYİ Party, and his feuds with the MHP and the modern CHP. In Özdağ's words, it was organized under the name of Ayyıldız Movement with the aim of "forming the motto of Turkish nationalism along the lines of Atatürk" and submitted its founding petition to the Ministry of Interior on August 26, 2021, when it was officially established.

Party leader Ümit Özdağ endorsed Ankara mayor Mansur Yavaş for the 2023 presidential elections, although Yavaş was a member of the CHP. Yavaş stated the declaration was without his knowledge and consent, declaring he was not a candidate for president. Ümit Özdağ confirmed that his statement was not with the consent of the Mayor of Ankara, claiming "It would have been a plot if we informed Mansur Yavaş".

In February 2023, Muharrem İnce, the leader of the Homeland Party, announced that his party was discussing an electoral alliance with the Democratic Left Party, the Victory Party, True Party and the Justice Party for the 2023 Turkish general election. On 6 March 2023, Muharrem İnce left the four-party alliance negotiations by sending a message to their WhatsApp group.

On 11 March 2023, the Ancestral Alliance was formed with Victory Party, Justice Party, and two other minor parties. The alliance endorsed Sinan Oğan as their presidential candidate in the 2023 elections, who came in 3rd place in the first round. Victory Party received 2.23% of the vote and failed to pass the electoral threshold. On 24 May, Özdağ and the party announced they would back Kemal Kılıçdaroğlu in the second round of the elections. The same day, it was revealed that there had been talks on Özdağ's appointment as Interior Minister if Kılıçdaroğlu won the election and that the parties had agreed on a seven-point memorandum of understanding. However, the party's endorsed candidate, Sinan Oğan declared his support for Recep Tayyip Erdoğan.

Upon its establishment, the party had two MPs, Ümit Özdağ and İsmail Koncuk. Koncuk later rejoined the İYİ Party. Özdağ continued his membership until his party failed to enter parliament in 2023. Ancestral Alliance was dissolved shortly after the election.

== Controversies ==
=== Süleyman Soylu and Ümit Özdağ ===
On 5 May 2022, Ümit Özdağ made a press statement against the Interior Minister Süleyman Soylu, who criticized him heavily in a television program, and stated that he would be in front of the Ministry of Interior building at 11:00 the next day and that he was waiting for Süleyman Soylu. Özdağ and the crowd went to the Ministry of Interior the next day, but were blocked by the police. The statements made by Özdağ in front of the Ministry, and the statements he made to Soylu increased the visibility of his party in the media.

On 13 September 2022, a banner with the inscription "Domestic and National Escobar" on the Victory Party's Fatih District Directorate building and a bald and halfless head image below was hung. The Prosecutor's Office quickly removed this banner, stating that it "insulted a public official". Although it was not disclosed which public official was effectively being insulted.

=== Devlet Bahçeli and Ümit Özdağ ===
In 2023, Ümit Özdağ criticised Devlet Bahçeli and described him as "an agent". Semih Yalçın, a high ranking MHP official later said that "Ümit Özdağ, who reveals his true colors by insulting our party, our chairman, and us, for revealing his hypocrisy, insincerity and bad intentions." He criticised Ümit Özdağ's father by saying "Ümit Özdağ's father, the late Muzaffer Özdağ, left our late Chief Alparslan Türkeş alone the day before the military memoir on March 12, 1971 and resigned on March 11. In other words, he had daggered his companion in the back and left. Ümit Özdağ was made a deputy by Mr. Devlet Bahçeli as 'maybe he will be a man' and important duties were assigned to him. However, he left everything and ran away, just like his father. He shot his companion in the back. It was a burden for Özdağ to work in the ranks of nationalism and the MHP; it was heavy. With the referral of the genetic heritage he carried, he threw himself into the arms of sedition, mischief and serialization at the first opportunity".

== Leadership ==
These are the board members of Victory Party:

| # | Name | Title |
|---|---|---|
| 1 | Ümit Özdağ | Chairperson |
| 2 | İlkim Yüksel | Director of Education and Social Policies |
| 3 | Cezmi Polat | General Secretary |
| 4 | Ali Dinçer Çolak | Director of Organization |
| 5 | Sevda Gül Tunçer | Director of Youth Politics and Party Spokeswomen |
| 6 | Şükrü Sina Gürel | Director of Foreign Policy Responsible |
| 7 | Mehmet Alagöz | Director of Development Policies |
| 8 | Murat Yıldız | Director of Legal Affairs |
| 9 | Şahin Filiz | Director of the Turkic World |
| 10 | Nadir Özkardaş | Director of Relations with Bureaucracy |
| 11 | Aslan Yaman | Director of Economics |
| 12 | Eser Güneysel | Director of Propaganda |
| 13 | Songül Mercan | Director of Local Administrations |
| 14 | Uğur Batur | Director of Press and Publications |
| 15 | Aziz Ergen | Director of Coordination Studies |
| 16 | Sevda Özbek | Director of Women, Family and Children |
| 17 | Koçak Tükenmez | Director of R&D |
| 18 | Fikret Bayır | Director of National Security |
| 19 | Seyit Yücel | Director of Political Affairs |
| 20 | Erdinç Örencik | Director of European and American Turkishness |
| 21 | Mustafa Hakan Akşit | General Accountant |
| 22 | Lütfü Şahsuvaroğlu | Director of Election Affairs |
| 23 | Mehmet Ali Şehirlioğlu | Director of Health Policy |
| 24 | Fatma Melike Karaaslan | Assistant Secretary General |

== Electoral performance ==
=== Parliamentary elections ===
| Election | Leader | Votes | | | Seats | | Position |
| Election | Leader | # | % | Rank | # | ± | Position |
|---|---|---|---|---|---|---|---|
| 2023 | Ümit Özdağ | 1,215,264 | 2.23 | 7th | 0 / 600 | new | Extra-parliamentary opposition |

=== Presidential elections ===
| Election | Candidate | Votes | % | Outcome | Map |
|---|---|---|---|---|---|
| 2023 | Sinan Oğan (Independent, supported by Victory Party) | 2,831,208 | 5.17% | 3rd | |

=== Local elections ===
| Election | Leader | City Councils | | | Number of municipalities | | Rank |
| Election | Leader | Oy | % | ± | # | ± | Rank |
|---|---|---|---|---|---|---|---|
| 2024 | Ümit Özdağ | 1.100.294 | 2.59% | New | 0 / 1,385 | Election | 7th |
