= Muhittin Böcek =

Turkish politician (born 1962)

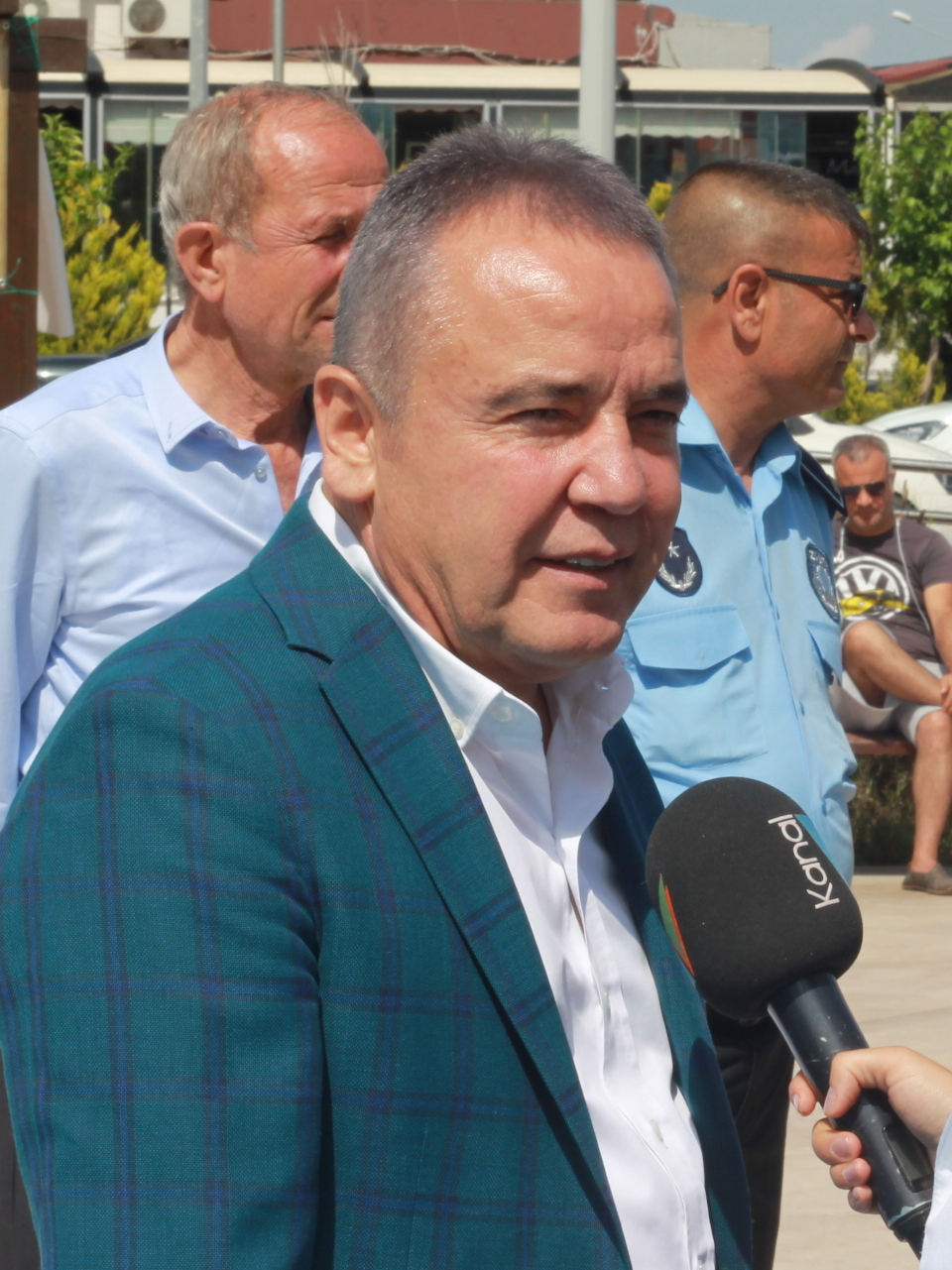

Mayor of Antalya
- In office 8 April 2019 – 7 July 2025 (He was suspended from duty by the decision of the Ministry of Justice.)
- Preceded by: Menderes Türel
- Succeeded by: Büşra Özdemir

Mayor of Konyaaltı
- In office 18 April 1999 – 8 April 2019
- Preceded by: Hasan Talşık
- Succeeded by: Semih Esen

Personal details
- Born: 25 October 1962 (age 63) Konyaaltı, Antalya, Turkey
- Party: Republican People's Party (since 2002)
- Other political affiliations: Motherland Party (1994-2002)

Muhittin Böcek (born 25 October 1962) is a Turkish politician from the Republican People's Party serving as the mayor of Antalya since 8 April 2019. He served as the mayor of Konyaaltı, a district of Antalya, from 1999 to 2019.

On 5 July 2025, he was arrested on suspicion of bribery.

== Personal life ==
He caught coronavirus during the COVID-19 pandemic and was taken to the intensive care unit on 8 September 2020, he was taken from the intensive care unit out at the end of 64 days.
