= List of banks in Turkey =

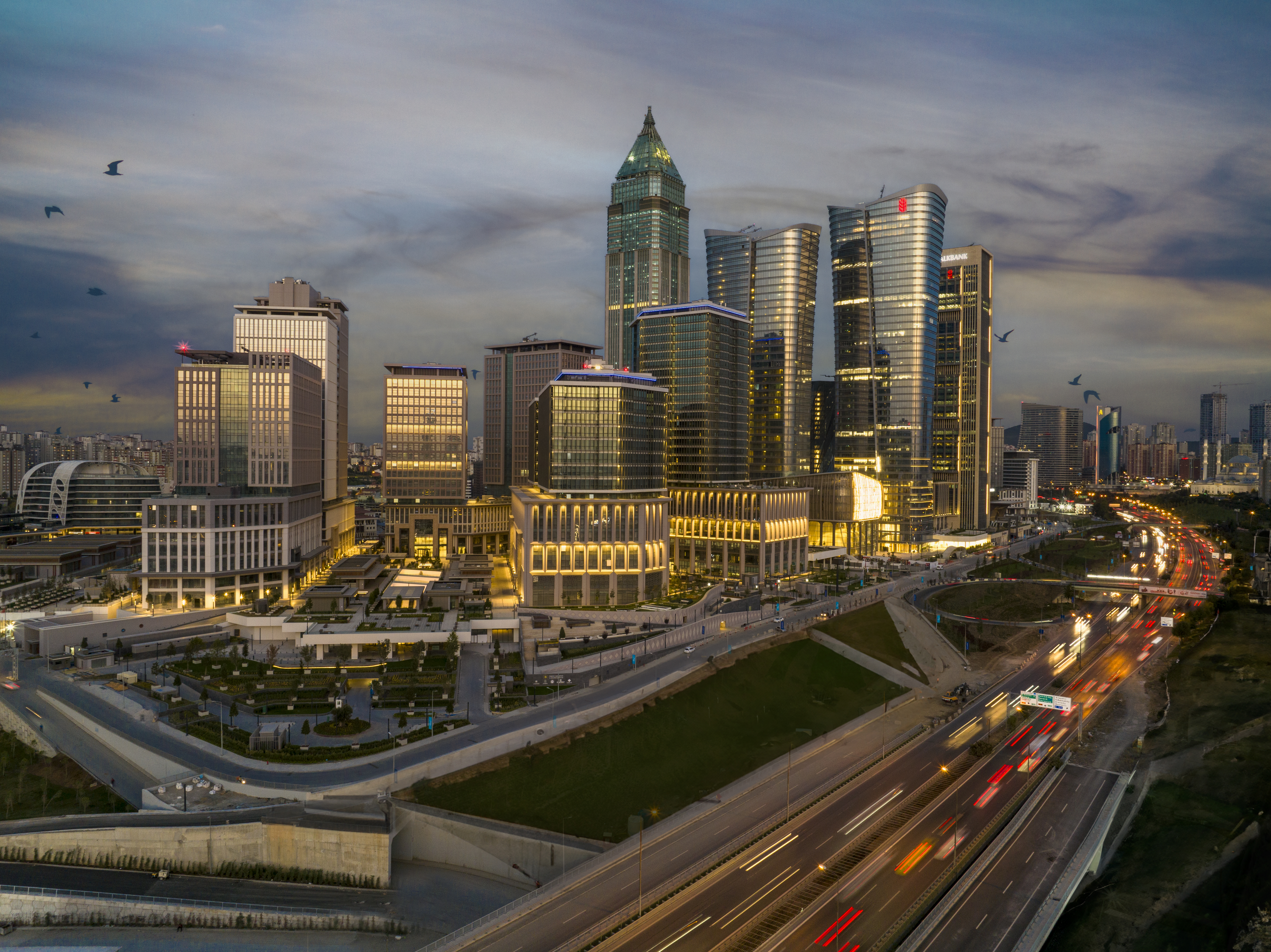
Istanbul Financial Center is the new campus for both public and private banks in Turkey

As of March 2024, the total assets of the banking industry in Turkey are 804.3 billion USD. There are 68 banks: 37 deposit, 21 development and investment, 9 participation banks and 1 bank under the supervision of the TMSF.

Below is a list of banking institutions operating in Turkey, approved by the Turkish Banking Regulation and Supervision Agency. Commercial banks are required to be members of either the Banks Association of Turkey or Participation Banks Association of Turkey.

== List of banks in Turkey by total assets ==
=== TBB data as of June 30, 2025 ===
Bank	Type	Funding	Website	Foundation	Number of Branches	Total Assets (Million $)
Ziraat Bank	Deposit bank	State-owned		1863	1,773	174,611
VakıfBank	Deposit bank	State-owned		1954	979	114,623
İşbank	Deposit bank	Privately owned		1924	1,033	100,037
Halkbank	Deposit bank	State-owned		1938	1,100	91,846
Garanti BBVA	Deposit bank	Foreign		1946	797	81,680
Akbank	Deposit bank	Privately owned		1984	689	70,918
Yapı ve Kredi Bankası	Deposit bank	Privately owned		1944	772	70,615
QNB	Deposit bank	Foreign		1987	426	45,273
Denizbank	Deposit bank	Foreign		1997	614	40,571
Türk Eximbank	Development and investment bank	State-owned		1987	24	27,720
TEB	Deposit bank	Privately owned		1927	436	18,571
İller Bankası	Development and investment bank	State-owned		1933	19	7,329
Türkiye Sınai Kalkınma Bankası	Development and investment bank	Privately owned		1950	2	7,218
İstanbul Takasbank	Development and investment bank	Privately owned		1995	1	6,625
HSBC	Deposit bank	Foreign		1990	44	5,836
ING	Deposit bank	Foreign		1984	59	5,132
Türkiye Kalkınma Bankası	Development and investment bank	State-owned		1975	1	4,657
Şekerbank	Deposit bank	Privately owned		1953	239	3,941
Fibabanka	Deposit bank	Privately owned		1984	36	3,909
Burgan Bank	Deposit bank	Foreign		1991	28	3,879
Anadolubank	Deposit bank	Privately owned		1997	95	3,858
Aktif Yatırım Bankası	Development and investment bank	Privately owned		1998	15	3,031
Alternatif Bank	Deposit bank	Foreign		1991	15	2,599
Citibank	Deposit bank	Foreign		1981	2	2,517
ICBC Turkey Bank (formerly Tekstilbank A.Ş.)	Deposit bank	Foreign		1986	31	2,420
Odeabank	Deposit bank	Foreign		2011	36	2,376
Nurol Bank	Development and investment bank	Privately owned		1998	1	2,051
MUFG Bank Turkey	Deposit bank	Foreign		2012	1	1,783
Deutsche Bank	Deposit bank	Foreign		1988	1	905
Türk Ticaret Bankası	Deposit bank	Privately owned		2021	6	716
Destek Yatırım Bankası	Development and investment bank	Privately owned		2021	1	678
Arap Türk Bankası (A&T Bank)	Deposit bank	Foreign		1977	4	561
Turkland Bank	Deposit bank	Foreign		1991	6	490
Golden Global Yatırım Bankası	Development and investment bank	Privately owned		2019	1	476
Enpara Bank	Deposit bank	Foreign		2023	1	360
PASHA Yatırım Bankası	Development and investment bank	Foreign		1987	1	335
Q Yatırım Bankası	Development and investment bank	Privately owned		2022	4	331
Birleşik Fon Bankası (formerly Bayındırbank A.Ş.)	Deposit bank	Under TMSF		1958	1	282
Intesa Sanpaolo S.p.A.	Deposit bank	Foreign		2013	1	240
Bank of China Turkey	Deposit bank	Foreign		2017	1	207
Tera Yatırım Bankası	Development and investment bank	Privately owned		2021	1	175
JPMorgan Chase	Deposit bank	Foreign		1984	1	172
D Yatırım Bankası	Development and investment bank	Privately owned		2020	1	160
Turkish Bank	Deposit bank	Privately owned		1981	6	147
Ziraat Dinamik Banka A.Ş.	Deposit bank	State-owned		2023	1	135
Bank of America Yatırım Bank	Development and investment bank	Foreign		1992	1	125
Misyon Yatırım Bankası	Development and investment bank	Privately owned		2021	1	97
Colendi Bank A.Ş.	Deposit bank	Privately owned		2023	1	76
Rabobank	Deposit bank	Foreign		2013	1	53
GSD Yatırım Bankası	Development and investment bank	Privately owned		1998	3	52
Bank Mellat	Deposit bank	Foreign		1984	3	52
Hedef Yatırım Bank	Development and investment bank	Privately owned		2022	1	48
BankPozitif	Development and investment bank	Foreign		1998	1	39
Standard Chartered Yatırım Bankası Türk	Development and investment bank	Foreign		1990	1	26
Habib Bank Limited	Deposit bank	Foreign		1982	1	17
Diler Yatırım Bankası	Development and investment bank	Privately owned		1998	1	8
Société Générale	Deposit bank	Foreign		1989	1	5
FUPS Bank A.Ş.	Deposit bank	Privately owned		2023	1	0
Aytemiz Yatırım Bankası A.Ş.	Development and investment bank	Privately owned		2024		

=== TKBB data as of June 2025 ===
Bank	Type	Funding	Website	Foundation	Number of Branches	Total Assets (Million ₺)
Kuveyt Türk Katılım Bankası	Deposit bank	Foreign		1989	452	1,047,971
Ziraat Katılım	Deposit bank	State-owned		2015	220	638,282
Vakıf Katılım	Deposit bank	State-owned		2016	213	561,830
Albaraka Türk Katılım Bankası	Deposit bank	Foreign		1984	225	388,749
Türkiye Finans Katılım Bankası	Deposit bank	Foreign		2005	260	356,651
Türkiye Emlak Katılım Bankası	Deposit bank	State-owned		2018 (1926)	122	298,369
Dünya Katılım (formerly Adabank)	Deposit bank	Privately owned		2023 (1984)	22	54,048
Hayat Finans	Deposit bank	Privately owned		2022		17,444
TOM Bank	Deposit bank	Privately owned		2022		14,281

== Defunct banks ==
- Anadolu Bank (1961)
- Bank Asya, Asya Katılım Bankası A.Ş. (Bank Asya is the trademark of Asia Participation Bank Inc.)
- Bank Ekspres
- Bank Kapital
- Bayındır Bank
- Demirbank
- Dışbank A.Ş.
- Egebank
- EGS Bank
- Emlak Kredi Bank
- Esbank
- Etibank
- İktisat Bankası
- İmar Bankası
- Impexbank
- İnterbank
- İstanbul Bank
- Kentbank
- Koçbank
- Marmara Bank
- Osmanlı Bankası (Ottoman Bank)
- Oyak Bank
- Pamukbank
- Raybank
- Sitebank
- Sümerbank
- Taib Yatırım Bank A.Ş.
- Tarişbank
- Toprak Bank
- Töbank
- Türk Ticaret Bankası
- Tütünbank-Yaşarbank
- TYT Bank
- Ulusal Bank
- Yurtbank

== See also ==
- Banking in Turkey
- List of banks in Europe
