= Banking in Turkey =

Banking sector in Turkey

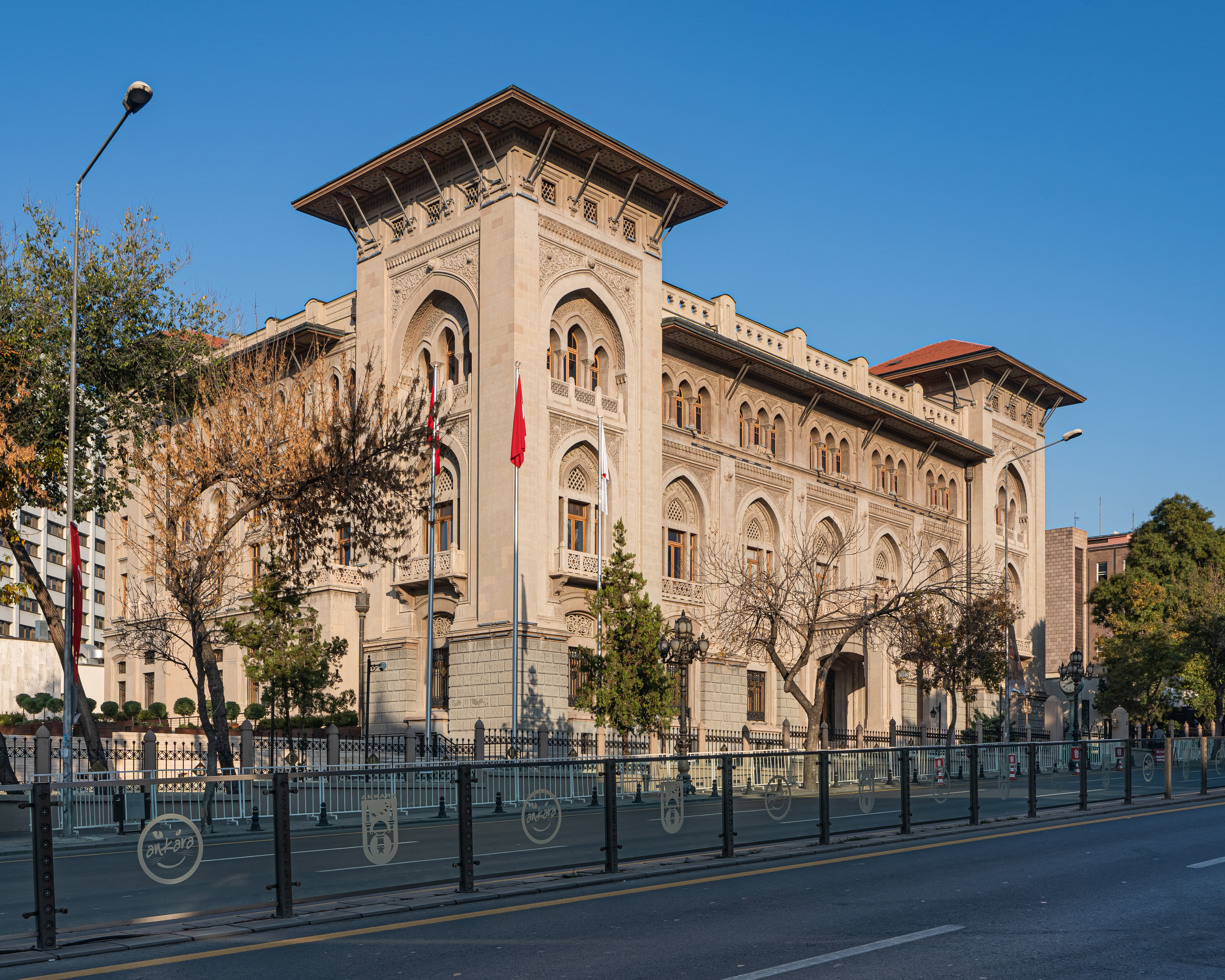
Historical building of Ziraat Bank, currently serving as Turkey's first banking museum

Banking in Turkey is an important aspect of the financial system Turkey's dynamic economy. Banks handle the majority of money and capital market transactions and activity. Commercial banks make up the majority of Turkey's financial sector, accounting for 91 percent of overall financial sector assets as of 2020.

The beginnings of the banking industry can be traced to the 19th century with Galata bankers creating the first Ottoman bank. As of January 2021, there are a total of 48 banks operating with 9,880 branches in Turkey and 71 branches abroad. The total value of assets of the banking sector in Turkey amounted to more than $800 billion.

== History ==
=== Ottoman period ===
The so-called money-changers and Galata bankers were the first to engage in banking activities in the early 1800s. All quasi-banking activities were carried out by money-changers during this era, and the Galata bankers were largely ethnic minorities in Istanbul. Following the Crimean War, the Ottoman Empire's financial condition deteriorated, necessitating external financial assistance. During this time, officials from a number of foreign banks traveled to Istanbul with the intention of giving high-interest financing to the Empire. In exchange for their loans to the state, several Galata Bankers were granted powers to form banks during the Ottoman Empire's last decades. These bankers built the Ottoman Empire's first banks and expanded their economic dominance significantly. With their loan to the Ottoman Empire, bankers Jacques Alléon and Teodor Baltazzi were granted the privilege of creating a bank in 1847, forming the Bank-ı Dersaadet, the Ottoman Empire's first bank. Mayer Amschel Rothschild, a French banker, was also banker who got permission from the Ottoman Empire to open another bank. The Ottoman Bank (Bank-ı Osmani) was founded in 1856 and operated as the Central Bank until the 1930s, with its headquarters in London.

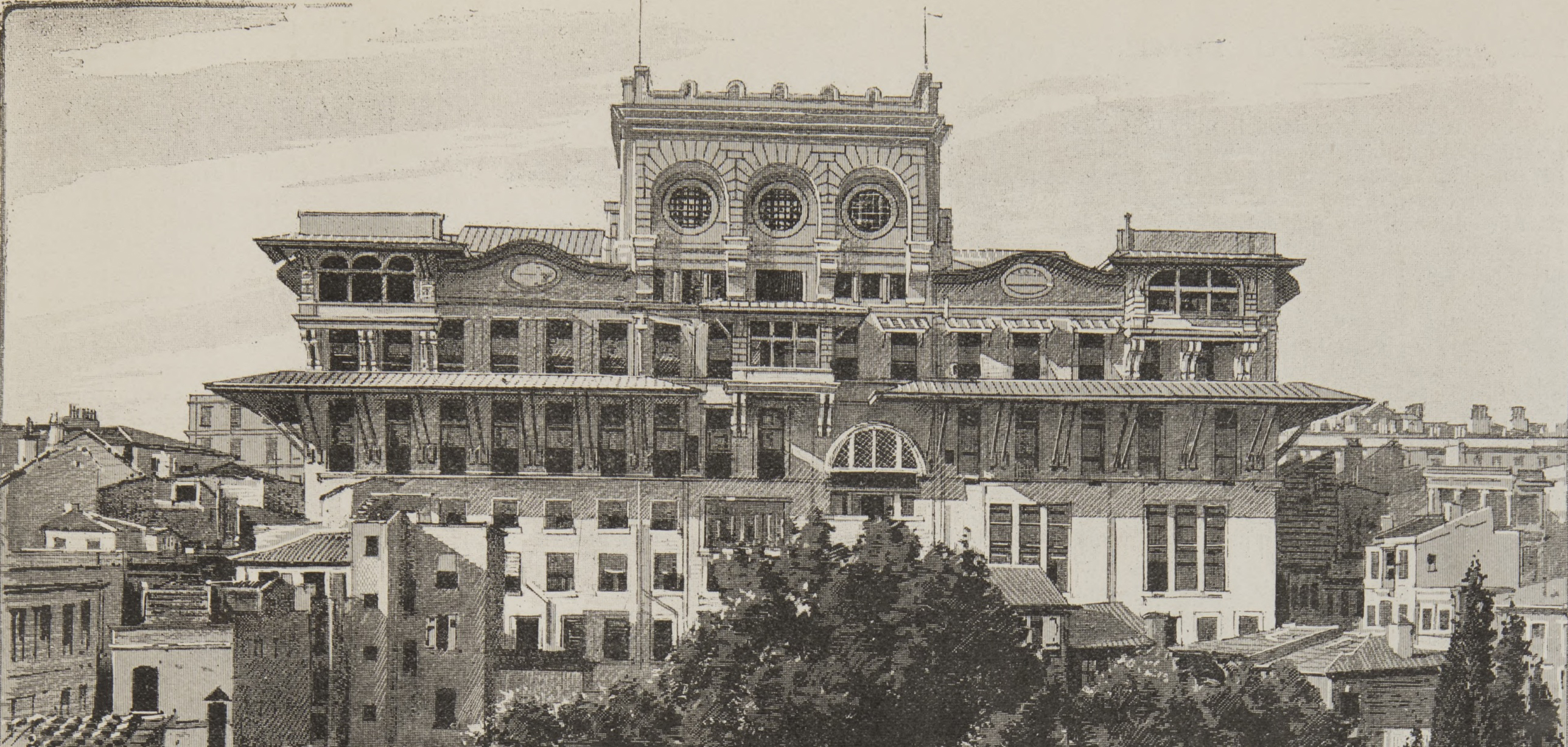
Imperial Ottoman Bank Headquarters, 1896. Designed by Alexander Vallaury.

In 1863, a French stakeholder was added, and the bank continued to operate as a central, commercial, and investment bank under the name The Ottoman Imperial Bank (Bank-ı Şahane-i Osmani). The bank is considered as the first modern bank in the Ottoman Empire. The bank was granted powers to print money.

In 1920, İş Bank was founded with funds transported to Ankara by Muslim Indians who wished to help the Turkish government in their war with the Greeks. İş Bank, as the representative of capital in Ankara, competed with the Ottoman Bank and prevailed, becoming the moderator of the country's new financial system. After the Ottoman Bank, several banks owned by foreigners, opened over time. Because both İş Bank and the Ottoman Bank were created with foreign money, they mostly lent to foreign traders. As a result, residents turned to moneychangers or the state office, which held the assets of widows and orphans.

The first Security Fund was established in 1863 in Ruse (in modern-day Bulgaria) with Ottoman capital thanks to Midhat Pasha. A second fund was established five years later in Constantinople. The public was in charge of the finances, which were under the government's jurisdiction. The Security Fund was established to gather public property, and people who asked for loans were granted money in pawns or with guarantors. In 1907, Security Funds were handed to the jurisdiction of Ziraat Bank.

=== Republican period ===
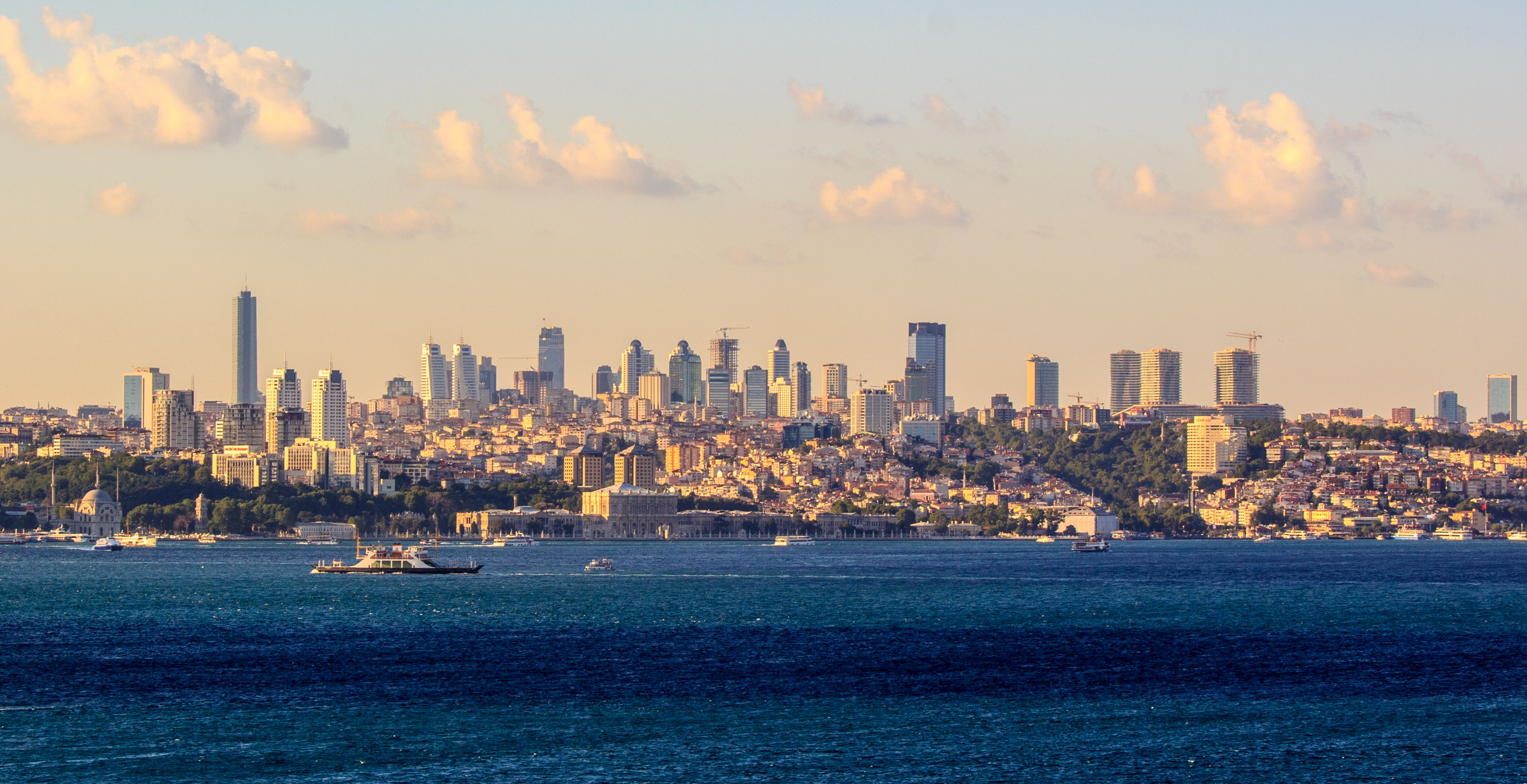
Financial institutions are primarily located in Levent, Istanbul.

The Central Bank of the Republic of Turkey, which was established in the early 1930s, is responsible for creating banknotes, safeguarding the currency, and regulating the banking sector. The Central Bank also lends to public and commercial banks. It also funds the budget deficit of the government. After 1983, the Central Bank began to restrict credit and increase its regulatory responsibilities.

There were only four foreign banks in Turkey before 1980. Following the liberalization policy of the Turgut Özal administration, this number rose rapidly. During these years, a series of reforms were implemented to boost financial market development, including the liberalization of interest and foreign currency rates, the acceptance of new entrants into the banking system, and the encouragement of international banks to operate in Turkey.

Turkey's banking industry has grown fast over the last decade to become a significant part of the economy. By the end of 2020, the banking sector's assets to GDP ratio have risen from 80 percent in 2010 to 120 percent. Banking institutions' outstanding loans in Turkey account for 71 percent of GDP, making it one of the biggest in the BSTDB Region. The banking industry in Turkey is characterized by a high level of government participation, with state-owned banks accounting for more than 40% of total banking assets. The percentage of state participation has risen in recent years, from below 30% in 2016, as the sector's development over the previous four years has been fueled mostly by the expansion of balance sheet from state-owned banks. As of 2020, three of the four largest banks in Turkey are state-owned. Recent studies note that through these institutions, the government has intervened to control credit allocation for political reasons. Turkey's banking sector is well-capitalized. The capital adequacy ratio has risen over the previous decade, reaching 19% by the end of 2020, demonstrating that banks possess capital buffers well beyond the legal minimum of 8%.

== Legislation ==
The main legislation in relation to the regulatory and supervisory framework for financial institutions are as follows:

- Banking Law No. 5411 (Banking Act).
- Commercial Code No. 6102.
- Code of Obligations No. 6098.
- Law on the Central Bank of Turkey No. 1211 (Central Bank Law).
- Capital Markets Law No. 6362.
- Law on the Protection of the Value of the Turkish Currency No. 1567.
- Law on Payment and Security Settlement Systems, Payment Services and Electronic Money Institutions No. 6493.
- Financial Leasing, Factoring and Financing Companies Law No. 6361
- other applicable laws and regulations.

== Regulatory agencies ==
=== Banking Regulation and Supervision Agency ===
The Banking Regulation and Supervision Agency (BDDK) was established under the new Law to protect depositors' rights and benefits. It has administrative and financial autonomy. The Banks Act, as well as the requirements of other bank-related legislation, apply to all banks in Turkey.

=== Capital Markets Board of Turkey ===
The Capital Markets Board of Turkey is responsible for transactions that come within the scope of capital market licences. It is a public legal organization with administrative and financial autonomy, independent regulatory and supervisory tasks and powers, and an independent decision-making process, similar to the BDDK. It oversees public corporations, capital market instrument issuers, exchanges, investment firms, and brokerage firms.

=== Savings Deposit Insurance Fund ===
The Savings Deposit Insurance Fund of Turkey is a legal entity that covers savings deposits and participation funds of natural persons in credit institutions. If a bank becomes insolvent or unable to function with the financial strength needed by law, the SDIF takes over the bank, strengthens its financial condition with exceptional measures, and restructures it until all of its obligations are paid and it is liquidated. The SDIF has administrative and financial autonomy and operates with an independent decision-making process.

=== General Directorate of Financial Markets and Foreign Exchange ===
The General Directorate of Financial Markets and Foreign Exchange (Turkish: Finansal Piyasalar ve Kambiyo Genel Müdürlüğü) is part of the Ministry of Treasury and Finance and regulates the public financing, global economic relations, exchange regimes and private insurance companies.

=== Financial Crimes Investigation Board ===
Financial offenses are investigated by the Financial Crimes Investigation Board. It is a department of the Ministry of Treasury and Finance that has the jurisdiction to oversee, audit, and demand information from financial institutions.

== Representation ==
The representative body Banks Association of Turkey was established in 1958 and has the purpose to protect banks' rights and benefits. Its tasks include conducting studies for the growth of the banking sector for its stable functioning and the development of the banking profession, strengthening competition power, taking decisions to prevent unfair competition and implementing the decisions in accordance with the principles of open market economics and competition.

== Ethics ==
As of 2023 several banks are willing to finance coal in Turkey.

== See also ==
- History of banking
- Economy of Turkey
- Istanbul Stock Exchange
- List of banks in Turkey
