= State-owned enterprises of Turkey =

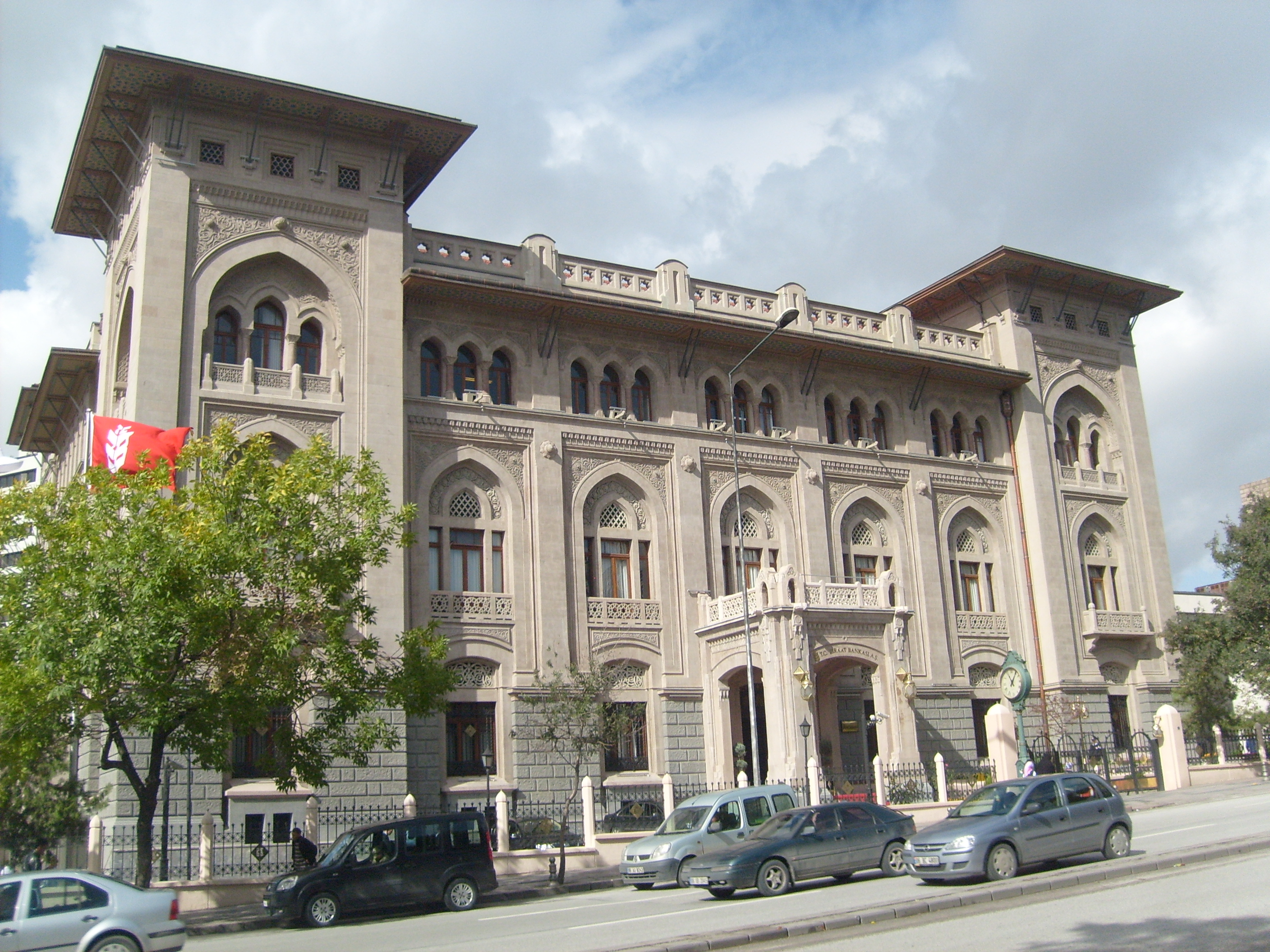
Ziraat Bank is a state-owned bank in Turkey founded in 1863.

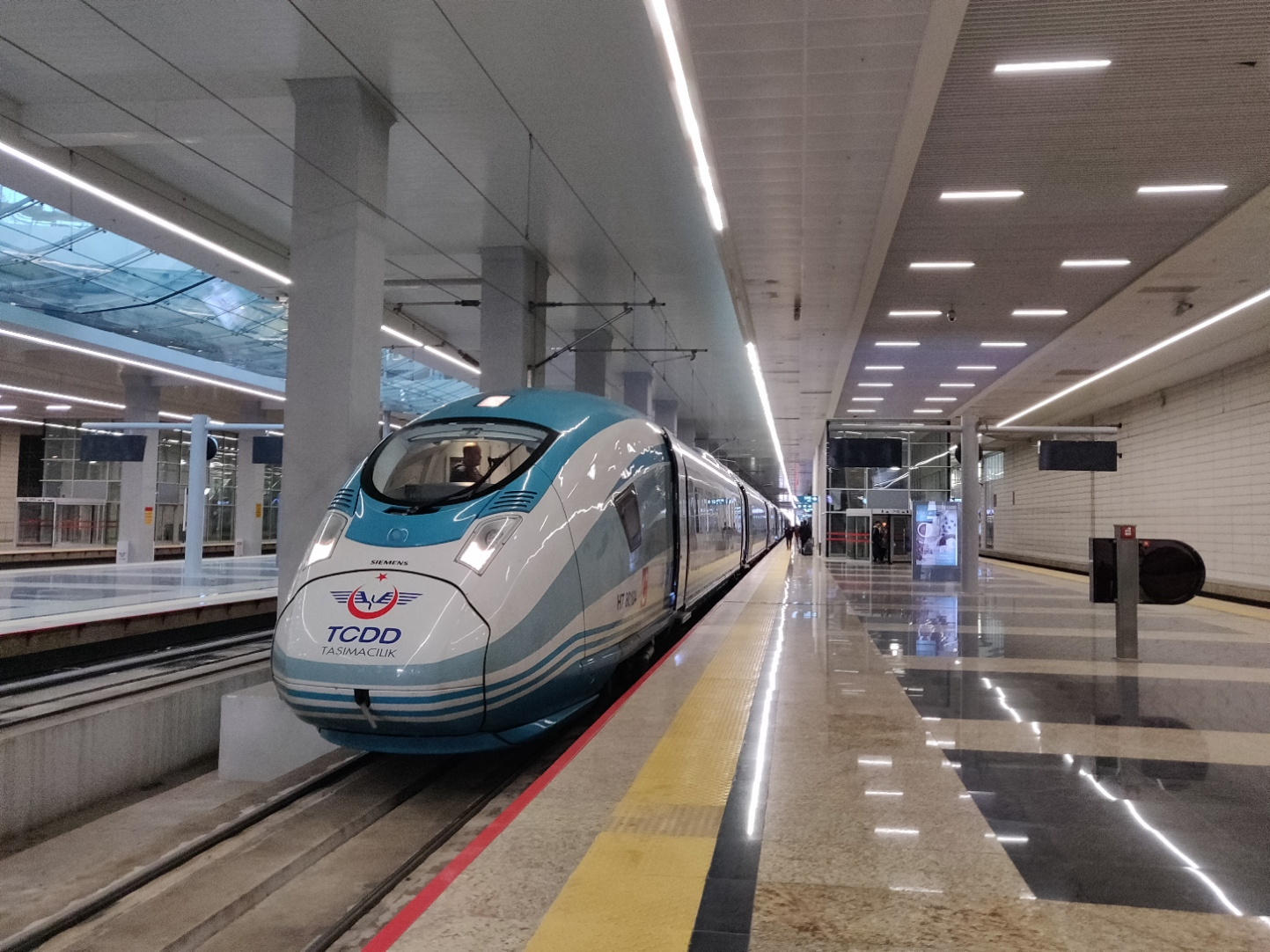
TCDD is a state owned rail transportation monopoly. HT80004 waits to depart the high-speed section of the Ankara railway station for Konya.

In Turkey, state-owned enterprises are called "Kamu İktisadi Teşebbüsü" or abbreviation "KİT".

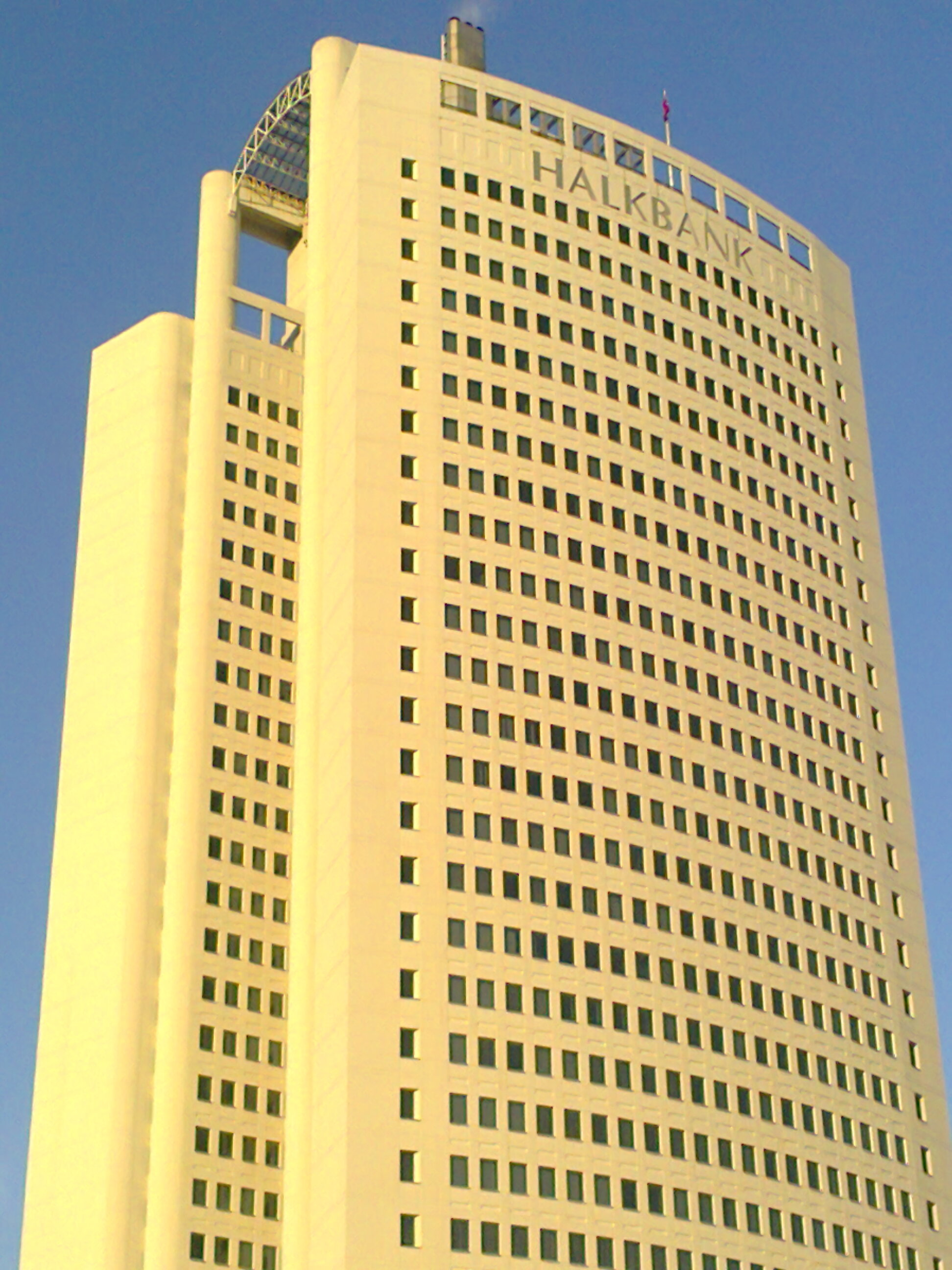
Halkbank Former Headquarters in Ankara

== List ==
Company	share	direct Owner	Note
Ziraat Bank	full ownership	Turkey Wealth Fund	The oldest bank in Turkey.
Halkbank	%51,11	Turkey Wealth Fund	
VakıfBank	%73,44	Turkey Wealth Fund	
Türkiye Kalkınma Bankası	full ownership	Turkey Wealth Fund	
Türk Eximbank	full ownership	Turkey	
İller Bankası	full ownership	Turkey	
CBRT	full ownership	Turkey	It's central bank of Turkey. Currently, it indirectly managed by Treasuary of Turkey
Türkiye Şeker Fabrikaları	full ownership	Turkey	In abbreviation: Türkşeker
Turkish State Railways	full ownership	Turkey	Directly managed by Government
BOTAŞ	full ownership	Turkey	Directly managed by Government
TPAO	full ownership	Turkey Wealth Fund	Directly managed by Government
Eti Mine Works	full ownership	Turkey	Directly managed by Government
Turkish Hard Coal Enterprises	full ownership	Turkey	
Çaykur	full ownership	Turkey Wealth Fund	
Turkish Post	full ownership	Turkey Wealth Fund	
Turksat	full ownership	Turkey	
TOKİ	full ownership	Turkey	
Mechanical and Chemical Industry Corporation	full ownership	Turkish Army Foundation	Indirectly managed by government
Aselsan	full ownership	Turkish Army Foundation	Indirectly managed by government
Turkish Aerospace Industries	full ownership	Turkish Army Foundation	Indirectly managed by government
HAVELSAN	full ownership	Turkish Army Foundation	Indirectly managed by government
Roketsan	full ownership	Turkish Army Foundation	Indirectly managed by government
ASFAT	full ownership	Turkey	Managed by government and Turkish Army Foundation
Turkish Maritime Organization	full ownership	Turkey	
Turkish Airlines	%49,12	Turkey Wealth Fund	
Electricity Generation Company	full ownership	Turkey	
Turkish Coal Operations Authority	full ownership	Turkey	
TÜLOMSAŞ	full ownership	Turkey	Produce railway equipments
