= İktisat Bankası =

- Company type: Bank
- Industry: Banking
- Founded: 1927
- Defunct: 2001
- Headquarters: Denizli-Istanbul, Turkey
- Products: Financial services

İktisat Bankası T.A.Ş. (literally: "Economy Bank Turkey Inc.") was a former Turkish bank. Founded as Denizli İktisat Bankası in 1927, it was transformed from a local bank to a nationwide operating deposit bank in 1971. Renamed in 1980, it was closed down in 2001 due to financial problems.

== History ==
Following the İzmir Economic Congress in 1923, a number of small local banks were founded in Turkey. One of these was Denizli İktisat Bankası, a local bank founded in Denizli in 1927. In 1971, it was reconstituted as a deposit bank operating nationwide. In 1980, the bank was renamed to İktisat Bankası T.A.Ş., and its headquarter was moved to Istanbul.

As one of the two banks affected by the financial crises took place in Turkey during February 2001, İktisat Banksaı went under the control of the Banking Regulation and Supervision Agency (Turkish: Bankacılık Düzenleme ve Denetleme Kurulu, BDDK) because of deposit outflows. At that ime, the bank ranked at 20th place in Turkey in terms of assets. It had 62 branches and 1,339 employees. The bank was transferred on March 15, 2001, to the Savings Deposit Insurance Fund of Turkey (Turkish: Tasarruf Mevduatı Sigorta Fonu, TMSF). The TMSF twice offered the bank for sale, however, it received no demand. The bank's cumulative loss amounted to ₺ 1.757 billion (around US$1.105 billion). The banking license of İktisat Bankası for deposit receiving was then revoked, and the bank was closed down on December 7 the same year.
