= Participation banking =

Islamic banking in Turkey and MENA

Participation banking is a name given to Islamic banks mainly in Turkey, as well as in the broader MENA region. There are participation banks in Turkey, Pakistan, Bangladesh, Indonesia, Saudi Arabia, Malaysia, the UAE and other Gulf countries.

== Core principles ==
Participation banks operate on Islamic financial principles distinguished from conventional banking:

- Prohibition of interest (riba): Prohibiting interest is necessary for but may guarantee Shari'ah compliance
- Risk sharing: Banks and customers share both profits and losses from investments
- Asset-backed financing: All transactions must be backed by real economic activity
- Prohibition of uncertainty (gharar): Ambiguous or uncertain transactions are not allowed
- Ethical investment: Avoiding speculative transactions and trading in impermissible products such as alcohol

== History ==
Participation banking share of assets in the Turkish banking sector was 2.13% in 2000, 5.1% in 2012, and reached 7.8% or 717.3 billion TL in 2021.

In 2020, top total sukuk issuers included: Malaysia, Saudi Arabia, and Indonesia.

According to Ernst & Young, the assets of global participation banking reached US $930 billion in 2015, with growth rates declining across all regions compared to previous years.

== Monetary policy implications ==
=== Integration with conventional systems ===
Integration of Islamic banking principles with modern monetary systems presents opportunities and challenges for financial reform. Islamic central banks have limited conventional monetary policy instruments.

=== Regulatory recognition ===
The sector has gained international recognition through regulatory frameworks. The International Monetary Fund Executive Board endorsed a proposal on the use of the Core Principles for Islamic Finance Regulation, which were developed by the Islamic Financial Services Board.

=== Monetary reform perspective ===
From a monetary reform standpoint, participation banking presents both opportunities and challenges:

Opportunities:

- Alternative to interest-based financial systems
- Emphasis on real economic activity over speculation
- Built-in risk-sharing mechanisms

Challenges:

- Integration with conventional monetary policy tools
- Standardization across different regulatory environments
- Limited scale compared to conventional banking

== List of participation banks ==
- Ziraat Participation Bank
- Vakıf Participation Bank
- Turkey Finance Participation Bank
- Albaraka Türk Participation Bank
- Kuwait Turk Participation Bank
- World Participation Bank

=== Defunct ===
- Asia Participation Bank (founded 1996, closed 2016)
