= VakıfBank =

Turkish bank

Türkiye Vakıflar Bankası T.A.O.

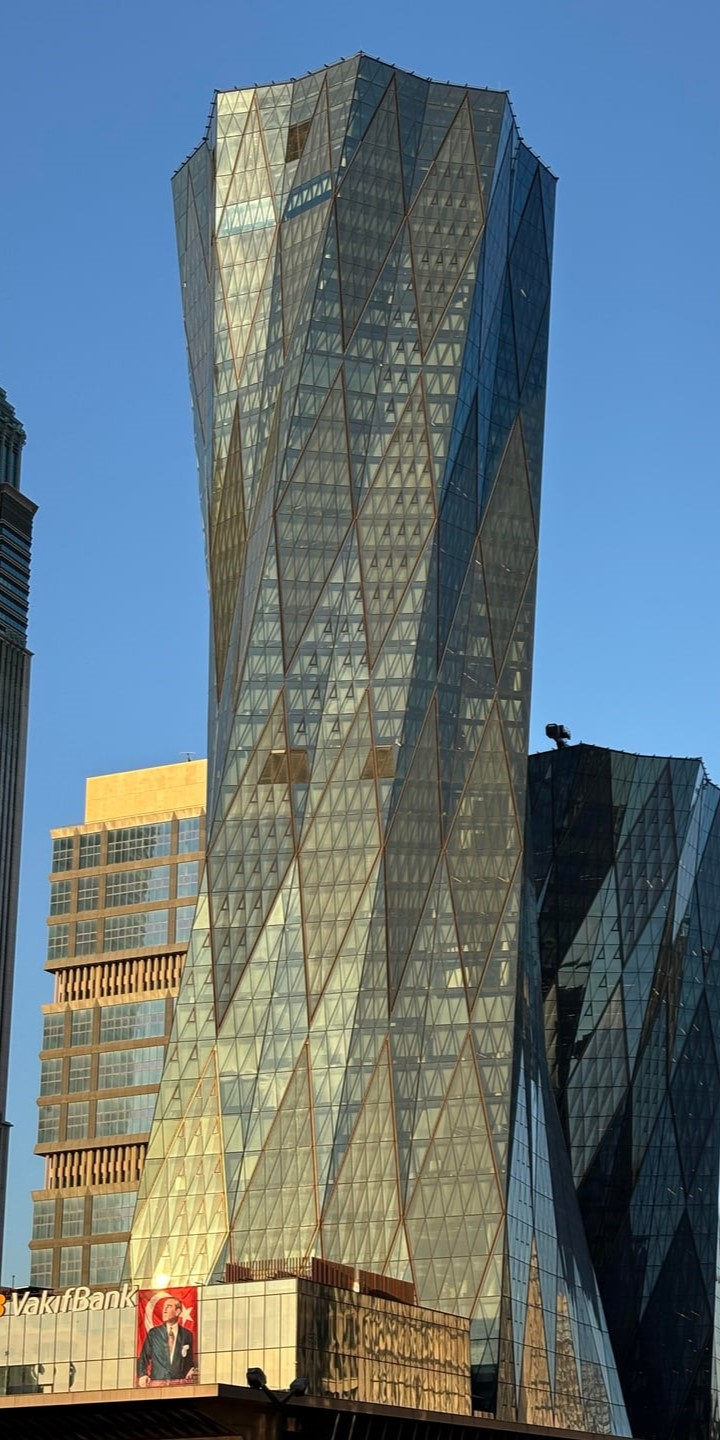
- Headquarters in Istanbul Financial Center
- Type: Anonim Şirket
- Traded as: BİST: VAKBN
- Industry: Finance
- Founded: January 11, 1954; 72 years ago
- Headquarters: Ümraniye, Istanbul, Turkey
- Number of locations: 950 Branches
- Area served: Worldwide
- Key people: Mustafa Saydam (Chairman); Abdi Serdar Üstünsalih (CEO)
- Products: Financial services, credit cards, consumer banking, corporate banking, investment banking, mortgage loans, private banking
- Revenue: ▲US$21.60 billion (2024)
- Operating income: ▲US$2.11 billion (2024)
- Net income: ▲US$1.42 billion (2024)
- Total assets: ▲US$118.65 billion (2024)
- Total equity: ▲US$6.84 billion (2024)
- Owner: Turkey Wealth Fund
- Number of employees: 18.579 (2024)
- Website: www.vakifbank.com.tr/en

VakıfBank (lit. 'Foundation Bank') is the second-largest bank in Turkey in terms of asset size, established with an initial capital of TL 50 million on January 11, 1954, and later started operating on April 13, 1954. Abdi Serdar Üstünsalih is CEO of the VakıfBank.

VakıfBank has 935 branches, 4,153 ATMs and 963,062 units of POS that constitute its distribution channels as of September 30, 2022. VakıfBank has six international branches located in New York, Bahrain, Arbil, Dubai, London and Qatar. In addition, VakıfBank operates in Austria with a subsidiary, VakıfBank International AG, which has branches in Vienna, Cologne, Frankfurt, as well as Budapest. As a result, VakıfBank maintains an active presence in 10 countries.

Vakıfbank offers commercial loan support as well as retail loans such as consumer loans, auto loans and housing loans.

== Present ==
The bank is a full-service commercial and retail bank with its headquarters in İstanbul, Turkey and is controlled by the Turkish Treasury, which (pursuant to Decree No. 696) on 11 December 2019 acquired shares in the bank that had previously been held by various foundations managed by the GDF and (indirectly through the Turkey Wealth Fund) acquired newly issued shares of the bank on 20 May 2020 and 21 March 2022. As of 30 September 2022, the bank was the second-largest Turkish bank in terms of assets, second in terms of loans and deposits and fourth in terms of branch network according to the BRSA and the Banks Association of Turkey. As of such date, the bank provided retail, commercial and investment banking services through a network of 935 full-service branches. On February 2, 2021, VakıfBank Qatar Branch was approved to commence the regulated activities by Qatar Financial Centre Regulatory Authority.

== Services ==
The financial services offered by VakıfBank include corporate banking, commercial banking, and small business banking, as well as retail and private banking. The bank is also into the business of investment banking and capital market operations, such as underwriting, financial leasing, and factoring.

Vakıf Yatırım, a subsidiary of Vakıfbank, provides support to stock market investors.

== Ownership Structure ==
Following the public offering in 2005, the 74.76% share of the Directorate General of Foundations in the bank decreased to 58.45% and the 24.89% share of the VakıfBank Pension Fund decreased to 16.10% and the publicly traded shares constituted 25.18% of the bank’s capital.

As of December 11, 2019, 43.00% shares and 15.51% shares of the Directorate General of Foundations representing Group (A) and Group (B), respectively (58.51% in total) have been transferred to the Ministry of Treasury and Finance as per the Presidential Decree dated December 3, 2019.

As of May 20, 2020, the capital increase process of VakıfBank was completed through private placement and Türkiye Wealth Fund became a shareholder of the bank with 35.99% share.

As of March 21, 2022, the capital increase process of VakıfBank was completed through private placement and Türkiye Wealth Fund increased its shareholder of the Bank with 64.85% share.

== Subsidiaries and affiliates ==
VakıfBank has 11 subsidiaries, which are Vakıf Faktoring A.Ş., Vakıf Finansal Kiralama A.Ş., Vakıf Gayrimenkul Yatırım Ortaklığı A.Ş., Vakıf Menkul Kıymet Yat. Ort. A.Ş., Vakıf Yatırım Menkul Değerler A.Ş., Vakıf Pazarlama San. ve Ticaret A.Ş., Taksim Otelcilik A.Ş., Vakıf Enerji ve Madencilik A.Ş., Vakıf Gayrimenkul Değerleme A.Ş., VakıfBank International AG. ANF Vakıf Elektronik Para ve Dağıtım Hizmetleri A.Ş. also VakıfBank has 14 affiliates operating in various sectors.

== See also ==
- List of banks in Turkey
