= TEB Family Academy =

Logo of the project.

TEB Family Academy (Turkish: TEB Aile Akademisi) is a social responsibility project, carried out by Türk Ekonomi Bankası (TEB) in order to raise financial literacy level of Turkish people. It was launched in October 2012.

== History ==
The project was launched by Türk Ekonomi Bankası (TEB) in October 2012 with the purpose of "raising financial literacy level of Turkish people". With this aim, a series of free trainings started to be provided to the individuals in TEB branches. By the demand of companies or organizations, volunteer TEB trainers could provide free trainings in large groups. In January 2013, a protocol was signed between Türk Ekonomi Bankası and Ministry of Family and Social Policy. With this protocol, the project became the official partner of "Family Education Programme" (Turkish: Aile Eğitim Programı) of the ministry and TEB started to give financial literacy education in every event that's organized within the ministry's project. TEB became the first corporate member of Financial Literacy and Inclusion Association (Turkish: Finansal Okuryazarlık ve Erişim Derneği, abb. FO-DER) at the same year, and on May 22, 2013, in cooperation with FODER, TEB organized 1st Financial Literacy and Inclusion Summit in alignment with TEB Family Academy’s objectives. On November 5, 2013 in Boğaziçi University, the first financial literacy and inclusion index of Turkey which was conducted through partnership with Boğaziçi University was announced. According to the study, financial literacy index of the country was 59.8, and financial inclusion index was 43.15.

In May 2014, TEB Children's Theatre (Turkish: TEB Çocuk Tiyatrosu) was founded. Through TEB Children's Theater's very first play Rüzgar'ın Kumbarası (Rüzgar's Piggy Box) TEB started to teach children financial literacy through a free musical. 2nd Financial Literacy and Inclusion Summit that was organized on October 27, 2014 in Boğaziçi University. During the summit, it was announced that a project named "Social and Financial Education with Art" (Turkish: Sanat Yoluyla Sosyal ve Finansal Eğitim) has been established in cooperation with Ministry of National Education and UNICEF, and with this project, financial literacy class has been added to curriculum 11 million secondary school students in Turkey.

On June 13, 2015, TEB Family Academy Festival (Turkish: TEB Aile Akademisi Panayırı) was organized in Antalya with the purpose of giving financial literacy education to people through an interactive family setting. In October 2015, the protocol about project "I Can Manage My Budget" (Turkish: Bütçemi Yönetebiliyorum) that was signed between TEB and Lifetime Learning General Management of the Ministry of National Education. Through the project, TEB will give free financial literacy education in Public Education Centers in 81 provinces of Turkey. Ümit Leblebici, General Manager of Türk Ekonomi Bankası, announced that by the end of 2015, financial literacy education were given over 200,000 people since the establishment of the project.

== Awards and honours ==
- In April 2013, the project received an award in "Active administration" of Europe CSR Awards Turkey which is carried out by Corporate Social Responsibility Association of Turkey.
- In December 2013, the project received 2nd Place of Jury Award in CSR Market Place Awards which is carried out by Corporate Social Responsibility Association of Turkey.
