= National debt of Turkey =

Total amount of debt owed to lenders by the Republic of Turkey

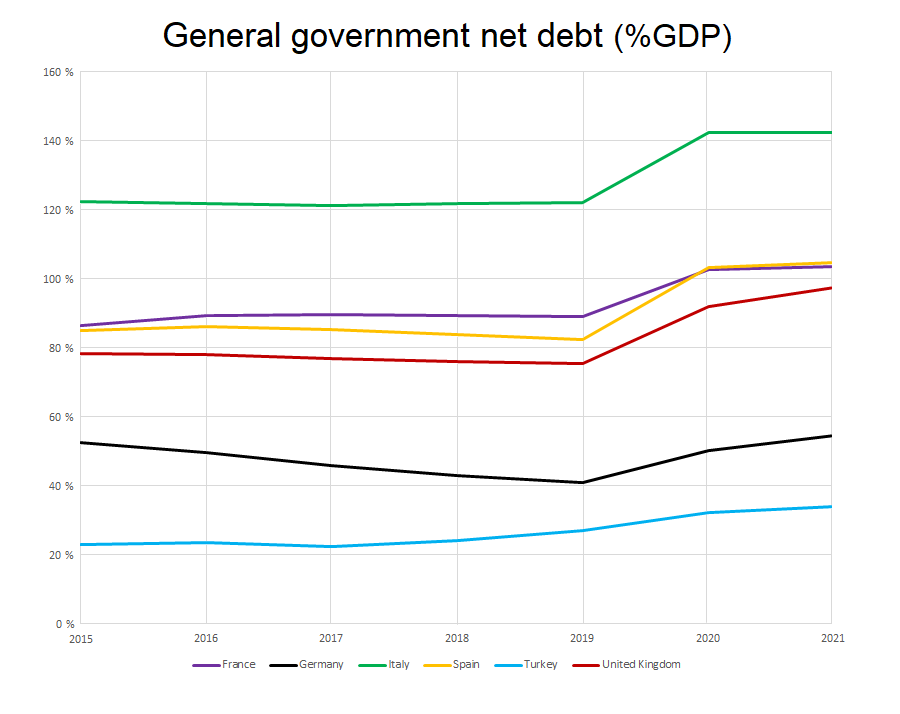
General government debt of selected European countries

The national debt of Turkey is the entire stock of direct, fixed-term, contractual, financial obligations of the state of the Republic of Turkey that are outstanding on a particular date. (Note: Government debt includes domestic and foreign liabilities, such as currency and money deposits, securities other than shares, and loans. It is the gross amount of government liabilities reduced by the amount of equity and financial derivatives held by the government. Because debt is a stock rather than a flow, it is measured as of a given date, usually the last day of the fiscal year. See: Central government debt, total (% of GDP) for Turkey, Federal Reserve Bank of St. Louis)

== Domestic debt ==
At the end of 2017, the total, gross state-debt of Turkey stood at approximately TL954 bn (appr. $221 bn), equivalent to about 30% of GDP. (Note: The Turkish Treasury calculates Turkish Lira (TL) equivalents of debt stock amounts from original, foreign currencies on the basis of the selling rate at the relevant end of period. See: Debt Management Reports, Treasury, p. 13) After deducting the net assets of the Central Bank of Turkey, public-sector deposits, and the net assets of the unemployment insurance funds, the total, net state-debt of Turkey stood at approx. TL262 bn (approx. $60 bn), representing 8% of GDP. (Note: Turkish 2017 GDP was TL3.1 tr ($722 bn). See: April 2018 Treasury Report.)

== Foreign debt ==
At the end of December 2017, the gross, foreign-currency denominated debt of the Turkish state stood at $453.2 bn (about 53% of GDP), while Turkey's net foreign debt was $291.2 bn (about 34% of GDP). Loans guaranteed by the Turkish Treasury stood at $13.8 billion during the same period.

In February 2018, the country's foreign-currency reserves stood at the equivalent of $114.5 bn.

== Concerns ==
While some analysts, in the recent past, have dismissed concerns about Turkey's "debt problem" as "alarmist" and based on "fallacies," (Note: "Countries all around the world have been issuing massive volumes on government debt for years – some with high rates of inflation (Turkey) and others with low rates of inflation (Japan) – without any problem of “funding” at all. The reason is that the deficits, after all, provide the funds that the Government borrows back!" :from Mitchell, William (2009) "D for debt bomb; D for drivel") in March 2018, citing concerns about the country's large, external-financing needs and a "deteriorating political climate", financial analysts Moody's downgraded Turkey's debt to Ba2 from Ba1, with "a stable outlook." Their report suggested the "possibility of a sudden, disruptive reversal in foreign capital inflows, a more rapid fall in already inadequate [foreign exchange] reserves and, in a worst-case scenario, a balance of payments crisis."

In April 2018, the Turkish Industry and Business Association chairman stated that the country "should leave the course of economic growth based on consumption and foreign loans," recalling that Turkey's foreign debt stock "now exceeds 53% of its GNP."

Turkey's Deputy Prime Minister Mehmet Simsek stated that the national currency's "depreciation has made the economy [more] competitive, and that "the worst for the Turkish Lira is now over." Analysts warned of a "systemic risk" on account of the weakening of the Lira against the U.S. Dollar and the Euro, and the growing amount of corporate, foreign-currency debt, (Note: About 80% of corporate debt is held by domestic banks) which has "more than doubled since 2009."

== Financial markets ==
As of 2018, Turkey's bond market, trading in the local currency, is the 6th largest among emerging market countries. (Note: See also: Recent trends in Emerging Market Economies government debt volume and composition, Bank of International Settlements, 2017) At the end of 2009, the corporate-bond market in Turkey amounted to TL481 million (US$340million), going up to TL1.4 billion5 (US$1.9 billion) by 2010 and to TL4.3 billion at the end of 2011. By 2017, the market totaled approximately TL18 bn ($5.2 bn), although a series of corporate defaults and restructurings has somewhat "dampened investor appetite."

The average coupon rate on corporate debt issued between 2015 and 2017 was 12.1%, compared with 11.1% on short-term deposits and 10.4% for 2-year government bonds.

The Turkish Eurobond market opened in early 2011, and banks and corporate entities were allowed to issue Eurobonds directly, without paying withholding taxes on interest payments under the bonds.

== See also ==
- Economy of Turkey
- Ottoman public debt
- Banks Association of Turkey
