= Egebank =

Former bank from Turkey

- Company type: Private company
- Industry: Financial services
- Founded: 1928
- Defunct: 1999
- Successor: Savings Deposit Insurance Fund of Turkey
- Headquarters: İzmir, Turkey
- Products: Banking

Egebank is a former Turkish bank, which operated from 1928 until it was acquired by Savings Deposit Insurance Fund of Turkey in 1999.

== History ==
Following the İzmir Economic Congress in 1923, a number of small local banks were founded in Turkey. One of these was İzmir Esnaf Ahali Bankası, a local bank founded in İzmir in 1928. The name of the bank means "The banks of artisans and people". In 1959 it was renamed as Egebank where Ege is the Turkish name of the Aegean Region. On 21 December 1999 it was acquired by Savings Deposit Insurance Fund of Turkey (TMSF).
