= Tütünbank =

Turkish bank

Tütünbank (Yaşarbank)
- Company type: Bank
- Industry: Financial services
- Founded: September 7, 1924
- Defunct: December 21, 1999
- Successor: Oyak Bank
- Headquarters: Akhisar and İzmir, Turkey
- Products: Banking

Tütünbank (full name (Turkish: Akhisar Tütüncüler Bankası) "Tobacco Producers' Bank of Akhisar") was a former Turkish bank which was eventually merged with Sümerbank in 1999.

== History ==
Following İzmir Economic Congress a number of small local banks were founded in Turkey. Tütünbank was one of them. It was founded on 7 September 1924 in Akhisar, Manisa Province, a region known for tobacco production. The bank was named after tobacco (Turkish: tütün). Its founding capital was TL 500,000. Among the 250 founding members there were notable politicians such as Celal Bayar (later, prime minister and president), Şükrü Saracoğlu (later prime minister) and Abdülhalik Renda (later the Speaker of the Grand National Assembly).

Up to 1930 the bank had a single branch office in Akhisar. After opening branch offices in various cities in the Aegean Region of Turkey it became a regional bank. In 1954 it was renamed as Türkiye Tütüncüler Bankası ("Tobacco Producers' Bank of Turkey") Also its headquarter was moved to İzmir which is the main export terminal of tobacco.

Its shares were sold to a holding company, Yaşar Holding, and in 1996 it was renamed Yaşarbank. However, on 21 December 1999 it was merged to Sümerbank (along with some other banks).
