= Birleşik Fon Bankası =

Birleşik Fon Bankası A.Ş.
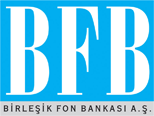
- Company type: Anonim şirket
- Industry: Finance and Insurance
- Predecessor: Bayındırbank A.Ş.
- Founded: 1958; 68 years ago
- Headquarters: Esentepe, Istanbul, Turkey
- Number of locations: 1 Branch (2010) in Turkey
- Area served: Turkey
- Products: Banking
- Parent: TMSF
- Website: www.fonbank.com.tr

Birleşik Fon Bankası A.Ş. (literally translated as Joint Funds Bank S.A. in English), was initially founded as Çaybank A.Ş. in 1958. In 1992, the name of the bank was changed to Derbank and after being acquired by the Bayındır Group in 1997, the name was changed to Bayındırbank.

With the decision made by the Turkish Banking Regulation and Supervision Agency (BDDK), Bayındırbank was transferred to the Savings Deposit Insurance Fund (TMSF) on 9 July 2001 and the name was changed to Birleşik Fon Bankası on 7 December 2005. The administration rights are being held by TMSF.

The following confiscated banks were transferred to the Birleşik Fon Bankası.

== Bayındırbank A.Ş. (09.07.2001) ==
Bayındırbank was transferred on 9 July 2001.

== EGS Bank A.Ş. (18.01.2002) ==
The TMSF board of directors decided on 26 December 2001 to merge EGS Bank with all of its active and passive assets to Birleşik Fon Bankası.

== Etibank A.Ş. (05.04.2002) ==
The TMSF board of directors decided on 20 March 2002 to merge Etibank A.Ş. which was during its liquidation process at that particular time. TMSF and BDDK's board of directors decided to cancel the liquidation process and merged the bank with Birleşik Fon Bankası. Esbank T.A.Ş. and İnterbank A.Ş. were also included during the merger.

== İktisat Bankası T.A.Ş. (05.04.2002) ==
The TMSF board of directors decided on 20 March 2002 to merge İktisat Bankası T.A.Ş. with Birleşik Fon Bankası.

== Kentbank A.Ş. (05.04.2002) ==
The TMSF board of directors decided on 20 March 2002 to merge Kentbank A.Ş. with Birleşik Fon Bankası.

== Toprakbank A.Ş. (30.09.2002) ==
The TMSF and BDDK board of directors decided on 26 September 2002 to merge Toprakbank A.Ş. with Birleşik Fon Bankası
