= Al Baraka Bank Pakistan =

Bank in Pakistan, founded 1991

- Company type: Unlisted public company
- Industry: Islamic Banking
- Founded: 1991; 35 years ago
- Number of locations: 190 branches (2023)
- Key people: Muhammad Atif Hanif (CEO)
- Products: Retail banking; Corporate banking; Investment banking; Consumer banking
- Revenue: ▲ Rs. 15.479 billion (US$55 million) (2023)
- Operating income: ▲ Rs. 6.124 billion (US$22 million) (2023)
- Net income: ▲ Rs. 3.104 billion (US$11 million) (2023)
- Total assets: ▲ Rs. 255.373 billion (US$910 million) (2023)
- Total equity: ▲ Rs. 18.253 billion (US$65 million) (2023)
- Parent: Al Baraka Banking Group
- Website: albaraka.com.pk
- Footnotes / references Financials as of 31 December 2023

Al Baraka (Pakistan) Limited (ABPL) (Urdu: البراکہ بینک پاکستان) is a Pakistani Islamic bank headquartered in Karachi. It is a subsidiary of the Al Baraka Banking Group, a Bahrain-based Islamic banking group.

== History ==
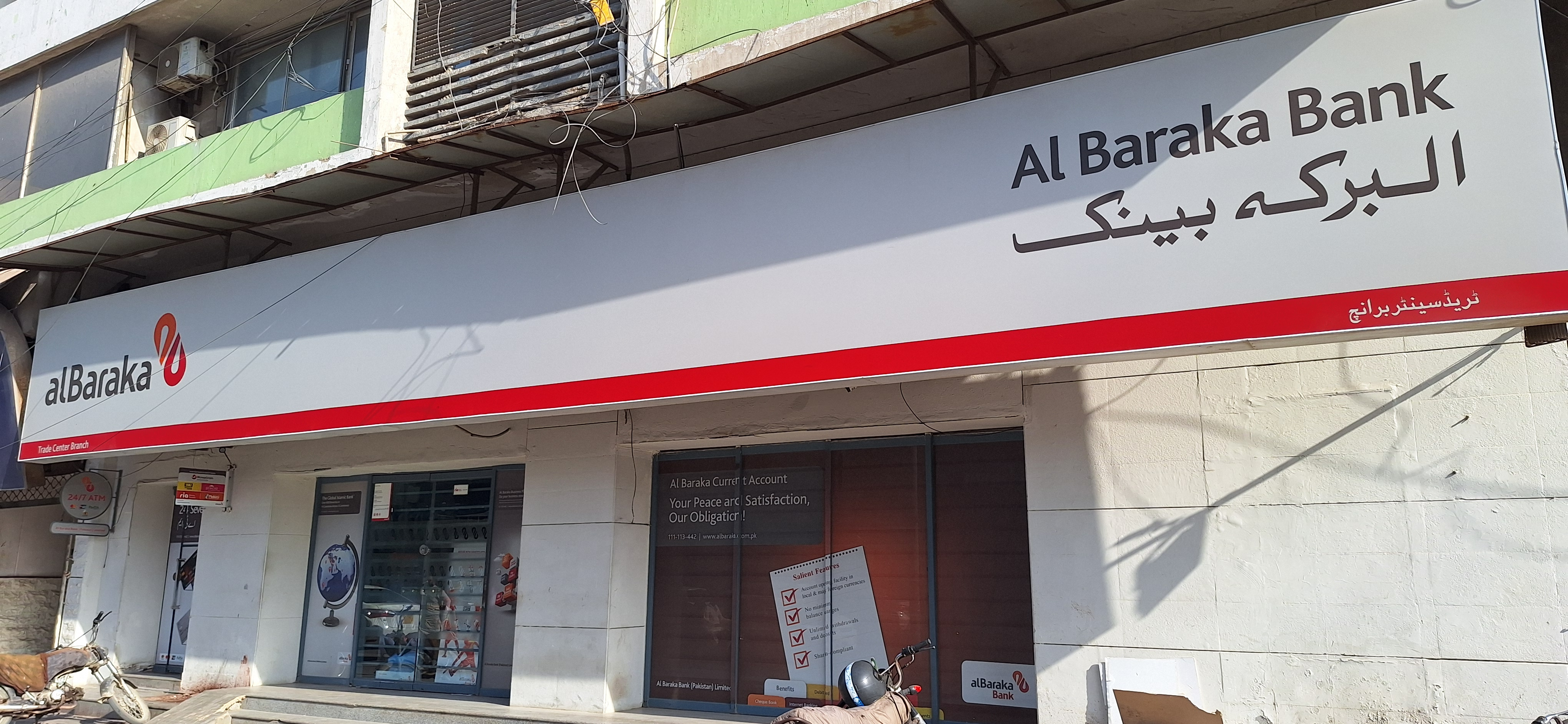
Al Baraka Bank's branch on I.I. Chundrigar Road in Karachi

Al Baraka Islamic Bank was initially established in Pakistan in 1991 as Al Baraka Islamic Bank (AIB) Bahrain, and later incorporated as a public limited company in December 2004, receiving its Islamic banking license in 2007.

In October 2010, Al Baraka Bank (Pakistan) merged with Emirates Global Islamic Bank (Pakistan), with the latter being renamed as Al Baraka Bank (Pakistan) Limited. It was the first merger in the Islamic Banking sector of Pakistan. The merger took place between the branch operations of Al Baraka Islamic Bank (AIB) Bahrain, Al Baraka Islamic Bank Pakistan (AIBP) and Emirates Global Islamic Bank (Pakistan), and thus from 1 November 2010, the operations of the merged entity began. The second merger took place in 2016 with Burj Bank Ltd. As of September 2016, the Bank has a national presence in Pakistan with a network of 191 branches in more than 97 cities across the country.
