= Dünya Katılım =

Turkish private sector bank

Dünya Katılım Bankası A.Ş.
- Type: Public (ISE: ADA)
- Industry: Finance and Insurance
- Founded: 1984; 42 years ago
- Headquarters: Mecidiyeköy, Istanbul, Turkey
- Number of locations: 1 Branch (2010) in Turkey
- Area served: Turkey
- Products: Banking
- Number of employees: 65 (2010)
- Website: www.adabank.com.tr

Dünya Katılım Bankası A.Ş. was founded in 1984 as Adabank and was seized from the Uzan Grubu as from the İmarbank Scandal. 99.9% of the company was transferred to the Savings Deposit Insurance Fund of Turkey (TMSF). Adabank A.Ş. was sold in 2006 to the Kuwaiti The International Investor Company. The Banking Regulation and Supervision Agency (BDDK), cancelled the deal, as it found the acquiring party not being able to raise the necessary capital. In 2008, another bid was made, and Kök Menkul ve Gayrimenkul Yatırım Ticaret A.Ş., part of the Sinpaş Group successfully bid for the bank. As of now, no other declarations and news have been received regarding future operations.

On 26 November 2010, Turkey's Savings Deposit Insurance Fund (BDDK), has turned down BankPozitif offer to buy Adabank at an auction. Savings Deposit Insurance Fund expected $90 million as sale price, and BankPozitif offer of $46 million was rejected as too low. Bank Pozitif, majority-owned by Israel's Bank Hapoalim, was the sole bidder for the small Turkish lender Adabank. Bank Hapoalim, Israel's second-largest bank, bought a 57.6 percent stake in Turkey's BankPozitif in 2006 and raised its stake to 65 percent in 2008.

== See also ==
- List of banks
- List of banks in Turkey
