= Port of İzmir =

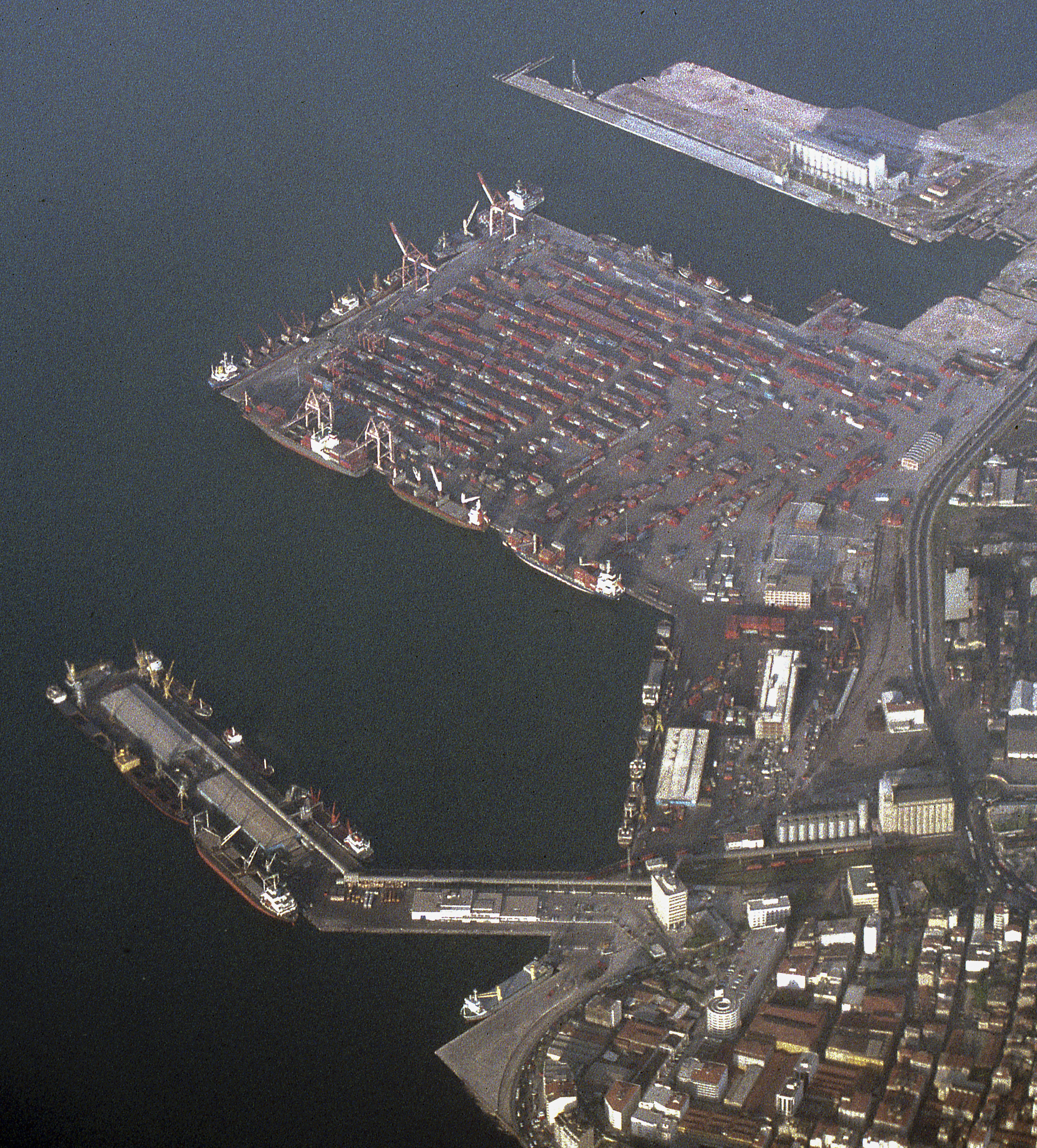
- Aerial photograph of the Port of İzmir
- Interactive map of Port of İzmir

Location
- Country: Turkey
- Location: Konak, İzmir
- Coordinates: 38°26′32″N 27°09′09″E
- UN/LOCODE: TRIZM

Details
- Opened: 1959
- Operated by: Turkish State Railways
- Owned by: Turkey Wealth Fund
- Type of harbour: Natural
- Land area: 902,000 square metres (9,710,000 sq ft)
- Employees: 753 (2006)
- Chief Executive Officer: Nihat Kaynar

Statistics
- Vessel arrivals: ▼2,047 (2018)
- Annual cargo tonnage: ▼9,040,779 tonnes (2018)
- Annual container volume: ▼610,908 TEU (2018)
- Passenger traffic: ▼9,172 (2017)
- Net income: ₺383.2 million (2018)

The Port of İzmir (Turkish: İzmir Limanı), alternatively known as the Port of Alsancak, is a seaport in İzmir, Turkey. It is situated in the Gulf of İzmir.

== History ==
İzmir was an important port of the Ottoman Empire and the first quay was constructed in 1869. The port was constructed between 1955 and 1959. Its first operator was Turkish State Railways. In 1960 it was acquired by DenizBank (a state-owned bank responsible for maritime business). On 1 January 1989 it was handed back to Turkish State Railways. In 2007 it was privatized. But because of legal reasons the privatization was halted. In March 2017, it became a sister port of the Port of Miami. In 2018 the port infrastructure was included in the Turkey Wealth Fund.

== Technical details ==
The total land area is 902,000 square metres (9,710,000 sq ft). The total quay length is 3,386 metres (11,109 ft). With this length the quay serves for 18 ships. The average depth is 11 metres (36 ft).

== Business ==
According to 2018 figures, the number of marine vessels which visit the port is 2,047. The total trading size in the same year was 9 million tonnes.
