= Yeni Kavaflar Market =

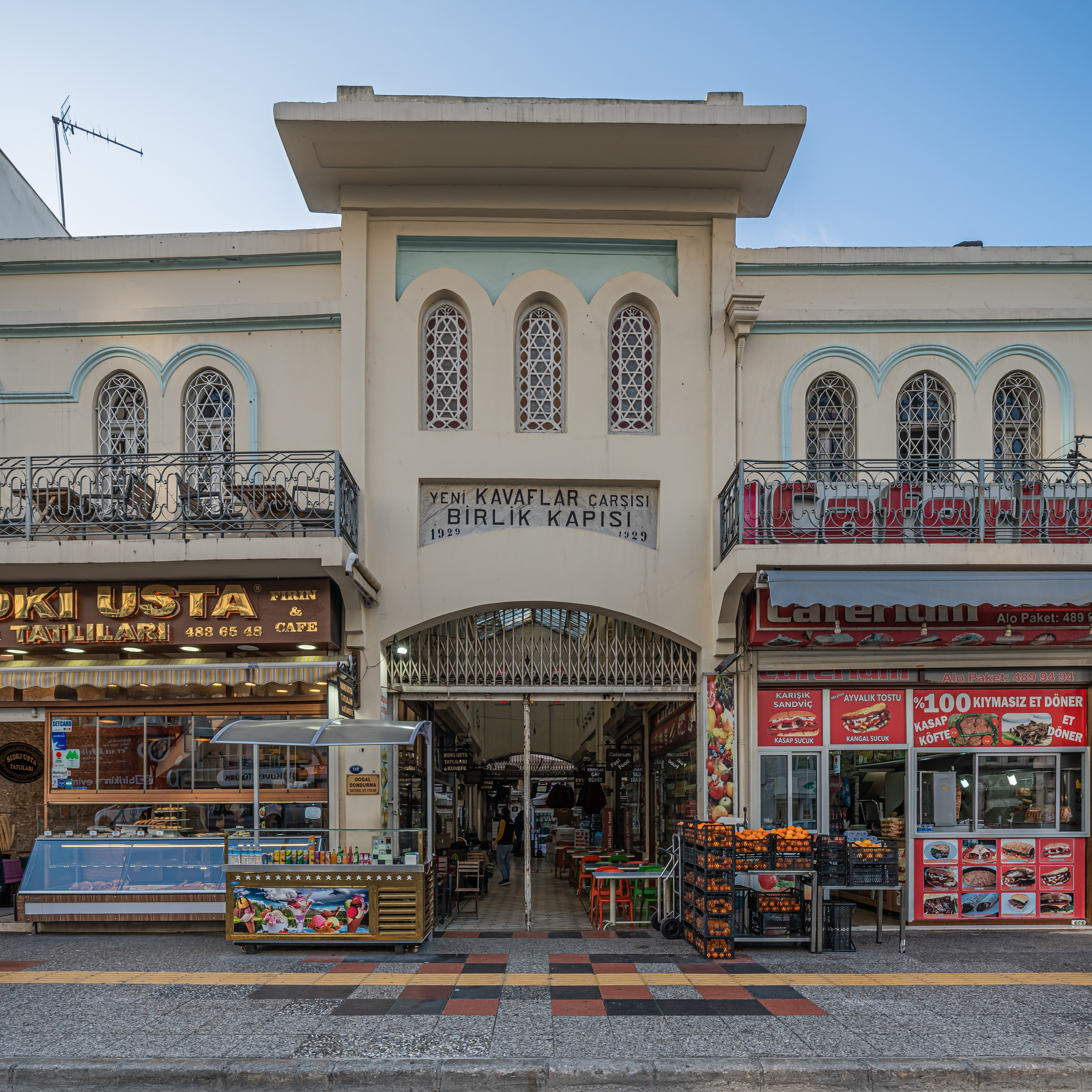
Birlik Gate, one of the five gates of the Kavaflar Market facing Fevzipaşa Boulevard

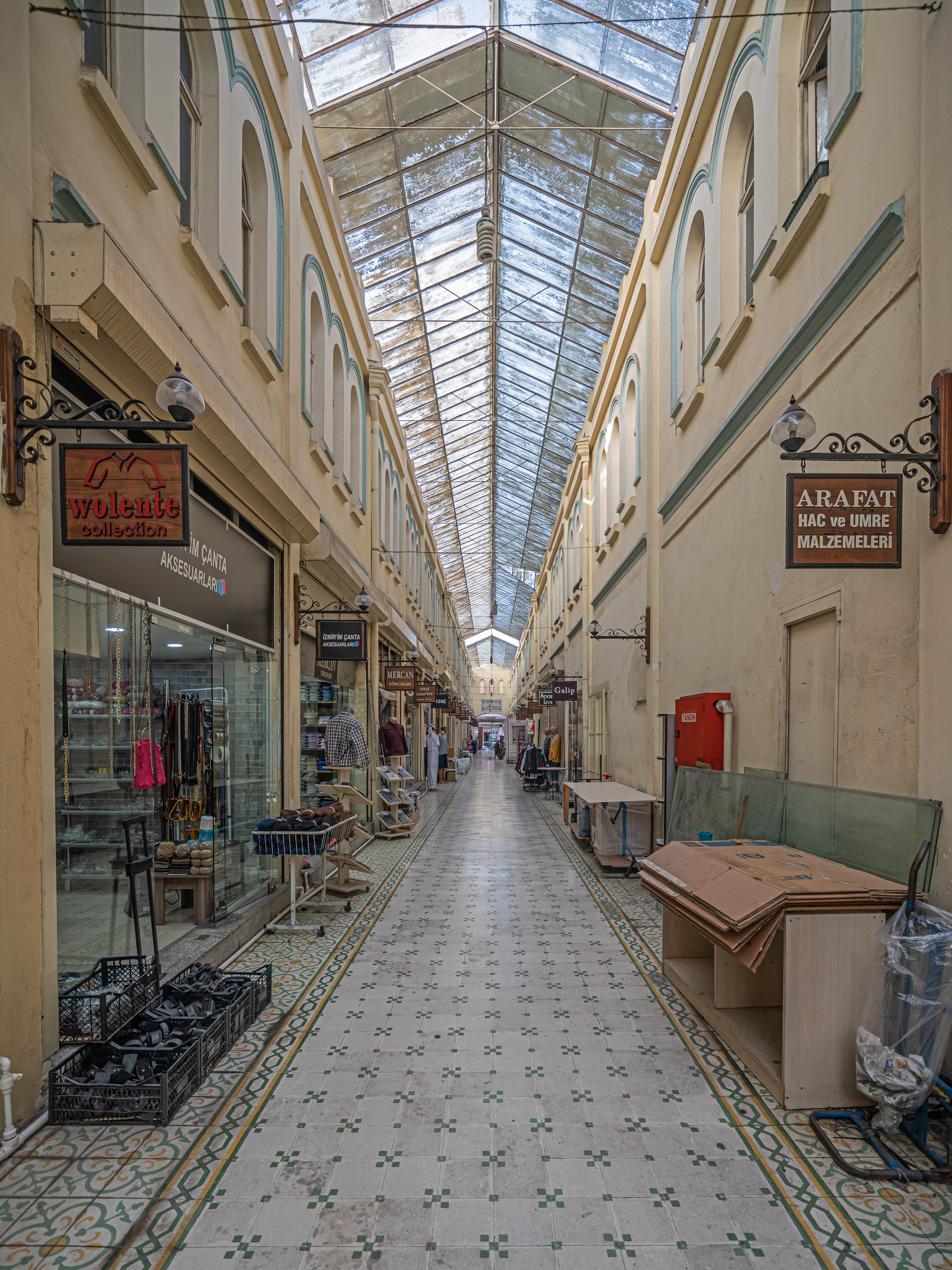
Interior of the market

Yeni Kavaflar Market (Turkish: Yeni Kavaflar Çarşısı) is a covered bazaar in İzmir, Turkey.

== Location ==
The market, situated at 38°25′20″N 27°8′9″E, is to the south of Fevzipaşa Boulevard and to the north of Kemeraltı Bazaar at Çankaya neighborhood of Konak district in İzmir. The 130 m (430 ft)-long west to east dimension of the market lies in parallel to the boulevard. There are 64 shops in the market.

== History ==
During the Great fire of İzmir in 1922, just after the liberation of İzmir, most of the İzmir business center were burned down. In İzmir Economic Congress held on 17 February 1923 – 4 March 1923, reconstruction of the business center was planned. The Yeni Kavaflar Market was a part of this project and it was completed in 1929. In 2009, it was restored by the Municipality of Konak, a secondary municipality of İzmir. Although the name Yeni Kavaflar means "New Shoemakers", there are many shops of diverse sectors such as leather dealers, furniture shops etc.
