= Ziraat Katılım =

State owned bank in Turkey

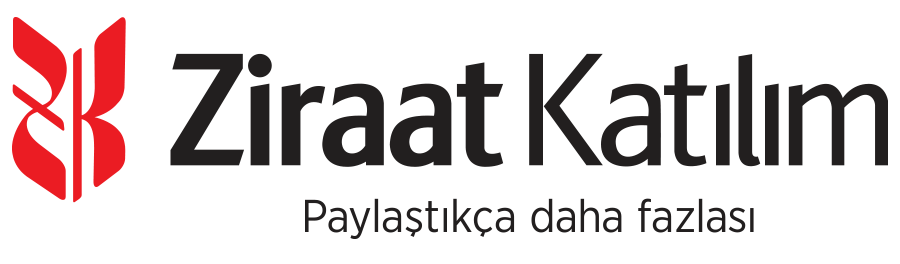
- Company type: Public
- Industry: Finance and Insurance
- Founded: 12 May 2015; 10 years ago
- Area served: Turkey
- Products: Islamic Banking
- Owner: Turkey Wealth Fund
- Website: ziraatkatilim.com.tr

Ziraat Katılım is a public participation bank in Turkey. The bank was founded on 12 May 2015, and is owned by the Turkey Wealth Fund. Ziraat Katılım is a member of Ziraat Finance Group, which has Turkey's largest bank Ziraat Bank both per number of branches and total assets, as of 2016. Its official motto is “Paylaştıkça daha fazlası”, meaning “Even more when shared”.

The official opening ceremony was held on 29 May 2015, on the anniversary of Fall of Constantinople with participation of the President of Turkey. First account was opened for the President Erdoğan.

The logo of the bank is very similar to Ziraat Bankası, both resembling an "ear of wheat" with bank initials, ZB and ZK respectively. Ziraat Bank logo additionally contains the letters "TC" for the Republic of Turkey (Turkish: Türkiye Cumhuriyeti).

Ziraat Katılım has 166 branches across Turkey as of 6 May 2023. The bank holds Islamic banking licenses for profit and loss sharing, consumer finance, and credit card services.

== See also ==
- Ziraat Bank
