= Anadolu Bank (1961) =

Former bank in Turkey

- Company type: Bank
- Industry: Banking
- Founded: 29 December 1961
- Defunct: 8 January 1988
- Headquarters: Ankara, Turkey
- Products: Financial services

Anadolu Bank was a former bank in Turkey.

It was founded by the merger of two other banks; namely Buğday Bank and Türk Ekspres Bank on 29 December 1961. Its founding capital was TL 45,000,000 and the number of its branch offices was 31. By 1987 its capital was raised to TL 75,000,000,000 and the number of its branch offices was raised to 130. However, on 8 January 1988 it was merged to Emlak Kredi Bank.
