= Raybank =

- Company type: Bank
- Industry: Banking
- Founded: 1956
- Defunct: 1963
- Headquarters: Ankara, Turkey
- Products: Financial services

Raybank is a former Turkish bank.

It was founded in 1956. The name of the bank ray means "rail" and the main shareholder was the Turkish State Railways staff charity fund with 29%. However, in 1963, the bank was liquidated under the supervision of Emlak Kredi Bank, a public bank.
