= Burj Bank =

Bank in Pakistan (2006–2016)

- Formerly: Dawood Islamic Bank Limited (2006–2011)
- Company type: Islamic bank
- Industry: Banking
- Founded: 2006
- Defunct: 2016
- Fate: Merged with Al Baraka Bank
- Successor: Al Baraka Bank
- Headquarters: Karachi, Pakistan
- Area served: Pakistan
- Website: burjbankltd.com

Burj Bank Limited, formerly known as Dawood Islamic Bank Limited (DIBL), was an Islamic bank based in Karachi. In 2016, it was merged into Al Baraka Bank.

== History ==
Burj Bank received its license from the State Bank of Pakistan in May 2006, and officially commenced operations on Friday, April 27, 2007.

The bank was the result of an initiative of the First Dawood Group, with the Islamic Corporation for the Development of the Private Sector (ICD) in Jeddah, Unicorn Investment Bank in Bahrain, Al Safat Investment Company in Kuwait, Gargash Enterprises (LLC) in Dubai, the Singapore-based entrepreneur Azam Essof Kolia and Shaikh Abdullah Mohammad Al-Romaizan, an entrepreneur from the Kingdom of Saudi Arabia. In July 2011, the bank was renamed Burj Bank.

Burj Bank merged in 2016 into the Al Baraka Bank, which had assets of more than $1.1b after the merger.
