= Anadolubank =

Anadolubank A.Ş.
- Company type: Corporation
- Industry: Banking, financial services
- Founded: 1997; 29 years ago
- Headquarters: Ümraniye, Istanbul, Turkey
- Number of locations: 106 branches (Jun 2016) in Turkey; 1 subsidiary (2016) in The Netherlands, Anadolu Securities, Anadolu Factoring
- Area served: Turkey; The Netherlands
- Key people: Mehmet Rüştü Başaran, (Chairman); Pulat Akçin (CEO); Hüseyin Çelik (CFO); Tunç Bergsan (CIO); Kürşad Orhun (COO)
- Products: Banking; Investment banking Investment management
- Total assets: ▲TL 10.9 billion (Dec 2015)
- Number of employees: 1,750 (Jun 2016)
- Parent: HABAŞ Group
- Website: www.anadolubank.com.tr

Anadolubank A.Ş. is a Turkish bank bought in 1997 by HABAŞ Group from the Prime Ministry Privatization Administration of Turkey (Turkish: T.C. Başbakanlık Özelleştirme İdaresi Başkanlığı). Anadolubank currently maintains 106 branches throughout Turkey and has 1,750 employees. In 2025, the bank is ranked as the 21st largest bank in Turkey.

Anadolubank provides vehicle loans, housing loans, consumer loans and commercial loans.

Anadolubank A.Ş. has the fully owned subsidiary Anadolubank N.V. in the Netherlands, maintaining one branch in Amsterdam.

Anadolubank provides credits for financing small and middle-sized companies. The bank is also targeting to handle a genuine service in retail banking through deposit and credit products.

== History ==
In 2024, its total assets were 104.26 billion TRY.

== Ownership structure ==
The main shareholders of the bank are Habaş Sınai ve Tıbbi Gazlar İstihsal Endüstri A.Ş Holding (69,98%) and Mehmet Rüştü Başaran (27,32%) of aggregate capital. Other shareholders are Aysel Başaran (1,16%), Erol Altıntuğ (0,63%), Elif Altıntuğ (0,62%), Habaş Endüstri Tesisleri A.Ş. (0,20%) and Fikriye Filiz Haseski (0,09%).

== Financial subsidiaries ==
- Anadolu Yatırım Menkul Kıymetler A.Ş.
- Anadolubank Nederland N.V.
- Anadolu Faktoring

== See also ==
- List of banks
- List of banks in Turkey
