= Mehmet Rüştü Başaran =

Turkish businessman

- Born: 1946 or 1947 (age 78–79)
- Occupation: Businessman
- Title: Chairman of Anadolubank
- Spouse: Divorced
- Parent: Hamdi Başaran (father)

Mehmet Rüştü Başaran (born 1946/1947) is a Turkish billionaire businessman, the head of Habas Industrial and Medical Gases Production Industries, one of Turkey's largest steel producers. In 2018, Mehmet Rustu Basaran ranked #1999 on the Forbes World's Billionaires list, with wealth listed at US$1.1 billion.

Habas was founded by his father, Hamdi Başaran, in 1956. he is the chairman and part owner of Anadolubank.

Başaran is divorced, and lives in Istanbul, Turkey.
