= DenizBank =

Turkish bank

DenizBank A.Ş.

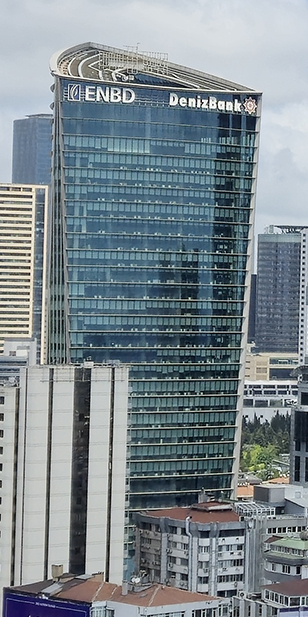
- DenizBank's headquarters in Istanbul
- Type: Anonim Şirket
- Traded as: BİST: DENIZ
- Industry: Financial services
- Founded: 1997; 29 years ago
- Headquarters: Şişli, Istanbul, Turkey
- Number of locations: 631 branches (2025)
- Area served: Turkey
- Key people: Recep Baştuğ (CEO)
- Products: Banking; Investment banking Investment management
- Revenue: ▲US$1.36 billion (2023)
- Net income: ▲US$967 million (2023)
- Total assets: ▲US$48.71 billion (2023)
- Total equity: ▲US$3.11 billion (2023)
- Number of employees: 14,136 (2017)
- Parent: Emirates NBD
- Website: denizbank.com

The logo used until June 2026

DenizBank A.Ş. (lit. 'Sea Bank') is a large private bank in Turkey. It is currently owned by Emirates NBD. It was owned and controlled by leading Russian bank Sberbank from 2012 to 2019. European financial services institution Dexia was the owner before this.

== History ==
Operations commenced in a Swissôtel The Bosphorus room in August 1997, and the bank moved into its new headquarters in Karaköy the following month. Its first 13 branches (5 outside Istanbul) were also opened. With a revitalization program initiated, branches were opened under a new corporate identity. Expansion was supported by the acquisition of branch offices from other banks, including Tarişbank in 2002. Internet banking was introduced in 1999, and Deniz Yatırım was founded in 2001.

2002 saw the bank move into its new headquarters in Esentepe, Şişli, and the acquisition of Tarişbank. The bank's IPO on the Istanbul Stock Exchange took place in 2004.

On May 31, 2006, Dexia announced it had acquired a 75% stake in the company for US$2.437 billion. The remaining 25% of the shares were held publicly. It remained the primary shareholder until 2012, when Sberbank agreed to buy DenizBank for US$3.6 billion from the financially troubled Dexia.

Emirates NBD agreed to buy DenizBank from Sberbank in 2018. The deal was completed in July 2019.

== Shareholders ==
As of July 2019, the only shareholder of the bank is Emirates NBD (99.85% of shares).

=== Companies sold under agreement with the EU ===
Due to Dexia's agreement with the European Union, certain businesses were required to be sold. The ones sold from the DFSG are listed below.

Name of Company	Country	Industry
Deniz Emeklilik ve Hayat A.Ş.	Turkey	Pension and Life Insurance

=== Companies sold ===
Name of Company	Country	Industry
Deniz Türev Menkul Değerler A.Ş.	Turkey	Securities

== Controversies ==
In November 2024, there were some developments regarding allegations of fraud involving high-profile football stars. Prosecutors in Istanbul have prepared an indictment seeking prison sentences ranging from 72 to 240 years for Denizbank's CEO, Hakan Ateş, and former assistant general manager, Mehmet Aydoğdu. They are accused of orchestrating a fraudulent scheme that defrauded players such as Arda Turan and Fernando Muslera, among others, out of approximately $44 million through a purported "secret special fund".

The case stems from actions taken by a former branch manager, Seçil Erzan, who has been accused of running a Ponzi scheme. The indictment claims that Ateş and Aydoğdu were aware of Erzan's activities, given their close relationships with some of the complainants.

Both Ateş and Aydoğdu have vehemently denied the allegations. Ates stated he only learned of the fraudulent activities in April 2023 and promptly reported it to authorities, asserting that any fund creation would require regulatory approval. Aydoğdu echoed this sentiment, claiming he had no knowledge of the fraud and attributing his involvement to his connections with Galatasaray, the football club linked to many victims.

Denizbank has publicly distanced itself from the allegations, stating that it has not received any formal information regarding the investigation and criticizing the premature disclosure of indictment details as a violation of confidentiality. As the case unfolds, no arrests have yet been made, nor have any court appearances been scheduled for Ateş or Aydoğdu.

== See also ==
- List of banks in Turkey
- List of companies of Turkey
