= Töbank =

Former Turkish bank (1958–92)

- Company type: Bank
- Industry: Financial services
- Founded: May 22, 1958
- Defunct: May 22, 1992
- Successor: Halkbank
- Headquarters: Ankara and Istanbul, Turkey
- Products: Banking

Töbank (full name Türkiye Öğretmenler Bankası) was a former Turkish bank.

It was founded on 22 May 1958 in Ankara. Its main shareholders were 21,000 teachers. The name of the banks means "Teachers' Bank of Turkey". In 1985 headquarter of the bank was moved to Istanbul. On 22 May 1992 it was merged with Halkbank, a Turkish public bank.

== Töbank camp ==
Töbank owned a holiday camp in Kumkuyu town of Mersin Province. The ground area of the sea side camp was 60 decares (0.060 km^{2}; 0.023 sq mi). After the merger, the camp was bought by the provident fund of Töbank employees. On 5 March 2011 the fund sold the camp to a private tourism company.
