= Milli Aydın Bank =

Milli Aydın Bank (Tarişbank)
- Type: Bank
- Industry: Financial services
- Founded: February 21, 1914
- Defunct: July 17, 2001
- Headquarters: Aydın and İzmir, Turkey
- Products: Banking

Milli Aydın Bank ("National Aydın Bank"), also known as Tarişbank, was a former Turkish bank that was founded in 1914 and was merged with Savings Deposit Insurance Fund of Turkey in 2001.

== History ==
Milli Aydın Bank was founded in Aydın, on 21 February 1914, during the Ottoman Empire era. Initially, the bank was aimed to support the fig producers around Aydın. Some of its founders were the members of the Union and Progress Party. Although the bank stopped the activities during years of Greek occupation of the Aegean Region it resumed its activities after the Turkish War of Independence.

In 1983, its headquarter was moved to İzmir. In 1987, the bank was renamed Tariş, (abbreviation of the Turkish phrase for "Marketing Cooperatives of the Agricultural Products"), a name used in the associated companies of the bank.

On 17 July 2001, the bank was merged with the Savings Deposit Insurance Fund of Turkey (TMSF).
