= Albaraka Türk =

Turkish Financial and Banking Services Company

Albaraka Türk Katılım Bankası A.Ş.
- Type: Public
- Traded as: BİST: ALBRK
- Industry: Finance and Insurance
- Predecessor: Albaraka Türk Özel Finans Kurumu A.Ş.
- Founded: 1984; 42 years ago
- Headquarters: Ümraniye, Istanbul, Turkey
- Number of locations: 225 Branches (2022)
- Area served: Turkey
- Key people: Malek Khodr Temsah (General Manager); Turgut Simitcioğlu (General Vice Manager)
- Products: Islamic banking Banking; Investment banking Investment management
- Revenue: ▲327.2 million USD (2008)
- Number of employees: 1,684 (2008)
- Parent: Al Baraka Group
- Website: www.albarakaturk.com.tr www.albaraka.com.tr/

Albaraka Türk was founded in 1984 in Istanbul, Turkey and began actively serving in 1985 and commenced its commercial activities in 1985 as Albaraka Türk Özel Finans Kurumu. It is now known as the first participation bank in Turkey.

It has been founded under the guidance of the strong capital groups in the Middle East, Al Baraka Group, Islamic Development Bank (IDB) and another industry group serving the Turkish economy for more than a half century, Al Baraka Turk continued operating in Turkey in compliance with the 5411 Banking Law.

As of June 2021, in our partnership structure, the share of the foreign partners is 60.87%, the share of the local partners is 0.72% and the share open to the public is 38.41%.

In addition to Albaraka Türk offering financial services to its customers through its branches, they also act as Anadolu Sigorta and Anadolu Hayat Emeklilik agencies, selling insurance policies, private pension plans and other services related to their domain.

Furthermore, Albaraka Türk in cooperation with Anadolu Hayat Emeklilik announced that they will offer private pension plans in which the funds collected will be used in Sharia compliant non-interest financial instruments. This product especially aims towards the more sensitive Islamic customers.

Albaraka Türk Katılım Bankası has profit and loss partnership, consumer finance, credit card Islamic license.

== Ownership structure ==
As of 30 September 2010 the ownership structure is as shown in the table

Ownership Structure	Share Amount (in TRL)	Share (in %)
Foreign Shareholders	356,591,882.00	66.16
Al Baraka Group	291,373,378.00	54.06
Islamic Development Bank	42,265,852.00	7.84
Alharthy Family	18,629,256.00	3.46
Others	4,323,396.00	0.80
Local Shareholders	61,311,022.00	11.37
Public	121,097,096.00	22.47
Total	539,000,000.00	100.00
