= Türk Ekonomi Bankası =

Turkish private sector bank

Türk Ekonomi Bankası A.Ş.
- Company type: Anonim Şirket
- Industry: Banking
- Founded: 1927; 99 years ago
- Headquarters: Ankara, Turkey; Istanbul, Turkey
- Key people: Ümit Leblebici
- Products: Financial services
- Subsidiaries: TEB Yatırım Menkul Değerler, TEB Faktoring, TEB Portföy Yönetimi

Türk Ekonomi Bankası (TEB; English: Turkish Economy Bank) is one of Turkey’s oldest financial institutions. BNP Paribas owns 45% of TEB's equity capital directly. The remaining 55% is owned by a holding company that is itself jointly owned by BNP Paribas and the Çolakoğlu Group (50% each).

== Overview ==
In addition to providing its customers with corporate, SME, commercial, treasury & capital market, retail, and private banking products and services, TEB also supplies investment, leasing, factoring, and portfolio management financial services and products through its subsidiaries and group companies. TEB is a bank that provides consumer loans, vehicle loans, housing loans and commercial loans.

Originally established in the city of İzmit in 1927 as a privately owned joint-stock company with the name Kocaeli Halk Bankası TAŞ; in 2005, TEB entered into a strategic partnership with BNP Paribas.

TEB was one of the first banks in Turkey to enter into mobile banking. The bank’s investments in this business line were centered around its CEPTETEB platform, a mobile application released in 2008.

TEB first entered the SME banking business in 2005. TEB is also active is startup business banking.

As of end-2019, TEB had around nine thousand employees on its payroll and was serving customers through extensive branch and ATM networks, its CEPTETEB and CEPTETEB İŞTE mobile apps, an online banking website, and a call center.

TEB is a partner in Bank of America's International ATM Partnership.

Three TEB subsidiaries include:

- TEB Faktoring AŞ: Provides corporate and commercial firms, as well as SMEs, with export, import, and domestic factoring products and services since 1997.
- TEB Portföy Yönetimi AŞ: Asset management company that has been in business since 1999.
- TEB Yatırım Menkul Değerler AŞ: Brokerage house that commenced operations in 1996 and carries out capital market transactions on behalf of customers in accordance with the requirements of Turkish capital market laws and regulations.

== See also ==
- BNP Paribas
- List of banks in Turkey

== Sources ==
- TEB 2019 Annual Report, TEB, 2019
