= Al Baraka Group =

Bahraini Islamic bank

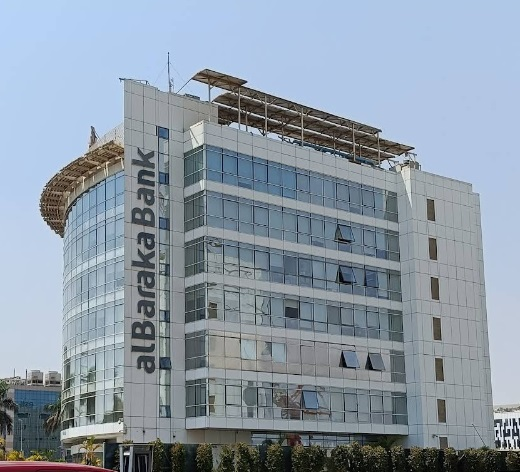
- Headquarters in Cairo, Egypt
- Type: Private bank
- Industry: Finance
- Founded: 1982; 44 years ago
- Headquarters: Manama, Bahrain
- Number of locations: 690 (2025)
- Area served: Algeria, Bahrain, Egypt, Jordan, Lebanon, Pakistan, South Africa, Sudan, Syria, Tunisia and Turkey
- Key people: Abdullah Saleh Kamel, Chairman; Mohamed Ebrahim Alshroogi, Vice Chairman
- Operating income: USD 1.3 billion (2025)
- Total assets: USD 31 billion (2025)
- Total equity: USD 2.1 billion (2025)
- Number of employees: 11 074 (2025)
- Parent: Dallah Al Baraka Group
- Website: www.albaraka.com

Al Baraka Group B.S.C. is a Bahraini international Islamic financial group that provides retail, corporate, treasury, and investment banking services through banking subsidiaries in 13 countries. Licensed by the Central Bank of Bahrain as an Investment Business Firm – Category 1 (Islamic Principles), it is headquartered in Manama, Bahrain.

== History ==
Al Baraka Group B.S.C. was established and registered on 27 June 2002 under a license from the Central Bank of Bahrain.

In 2006, Al Baraka launched an initial public offering, raising more than US$630 million and listing its shares on the Bahrain Bourse and Nasdaq Dubai. Trading on both markets began in September 2006. In 2017, the group issued US$400 million in Tier-1 Islamic sukuk, which was listed on the Irish Stock Exchange.

In June 2020, Abdullah Saleh Kamel was appointed chairman, succeeding his father, Saleh Abdullah Kamel.

In July 2022, the company changed its official name from Al Baraka Banking Group B.S.C. to Al Baraka Group B.S.C., after receiving regulatory approval to convert its license from Wholesale Bank (Islamic Principles) to Investment Firm Category 1 (Islamic Principles).

In November 2023, shareholders approved the delisting of the company from the Bahrain Bourse and its conversion from a public shareholding company to a closed shareholding company, subject to regulatory approvals. The shares were delisted from the Bahrain Bourse in July 2024.

== International operations ==
The global network of Al Baraka Group is present in 13 countries, as well under the Al Baraka and other brand names.

=== Africa ===
- Algeria: (also known as Banque Al Baraka D'Algerie), operates since 1991.
- Egypt: (formerly known as Al Ahram Bank and Egyptian Saudi Finance Bank) operates since 1980.
- South Africa: Operates since 1989.
- Sudan: Operates since 1985.
- Tunisia: (formerly known as Saudi Tunisian Finance Bank until 2009), operates since 1983.

=== Asia ===
- Iraq: (Albaraka Türk).
- Jordan: Operates as Jordan Islamic Bank, was the first international operation of the bank, operates since 1978.
- Lebanon: Operates since 1992. On November 19, 2022, the Central Bank of Lebanon officially seized control of Al Baraka Bank Lebanon, stripping the existing board of directors and executive management of their powers.
- Pakistan: (Al Baraka Bank Pakistan).
- Syria: Operates as a joint-stock company since 2007.
- Turkey: (Albaraka Türk).
