= Bank Asya =

Turkish private finance house

- Type: Private
- Industry: Financial services
- Founded: October 24, 1996; 29 years ago
- Defunct: July 22, 2016; 9 years ago
- Headquarters: Istanbul, Turkey
- Key people: İsmail GÜLER - Chairman of the Board of Directors; Abdullah GÜZELDÜLGER- Board Member President & CEO
- Number of employees: over 2,448
- Website: www.bankasya.com.tr

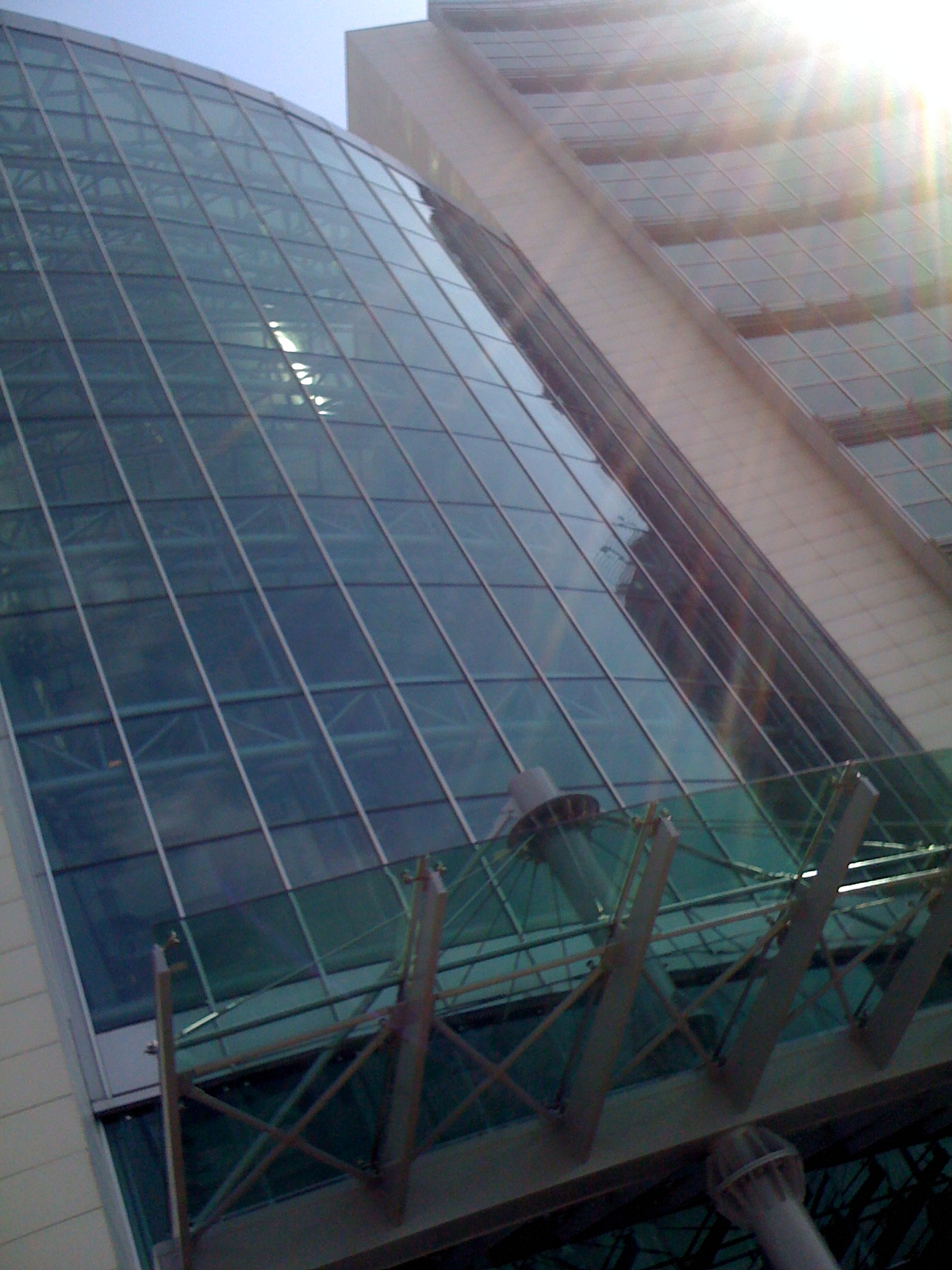
Bank Asya

Bank Asya was a former Turkish participation bank that operated between 1996 and 2016. It was established on October 24, 1996, with its head office in Istanbul, as the sixth private finance house of Turkey and an Islamic participation bank.

Bank Asya opened its first branch in Altunizade, Istanbul on 24 October 1996. The opening ceremony was held with an official ceremony and was attended by then Deputy Prime Minister Tansu Çiller, State Minister Abdullah Gül, Istanbul Metropolitan Mayor Recep Tayyip Erdoğan, and İhsan Kalkavan, Chairman of the Board of Directors of Asya Finans. The company's name, which had been previously "Asya Finans Kurumu Anonim Şirketi" (Asya Finance Incorporated Company), was changed into "Asya Katilim Bankasi Anonim Şirketi" (Asya Participation Bank Inc.) on December 20, 2005.

Bank Asya carried out its activities with 182 branches, 2 national and 1300 foreign correspondent banks besides the head office units as of May 2011.

The bank has been strongly tied to the controversial Gülen movement, led by the Islamic cleric and preacher Fethullah Gülen, and is widely considered to be founded and operated by his followers.

On 18 September 2014, President Erdoğan spoke at the Turkish Industry and Business Association, TÜSİAD meeting. Bank Asya was on Erdoğan's agenda without explicitly mentioning its name: "Yesterday, the main opposition leader accused us of working to bankrupt a bank. That bank is already bankrupt."

On 22 July 2016, the Banking Regulation and Supervision Agency (BDDK) cancelled Bank Asya's banking permissions as part of the 2016 purges.

With Decision No. 6318 of the Banking Regulation and Supervision Agency published on 29 May 2015, Bank Asya was transferred to the SDIF. The decision was published in the Official Gazette dated 30.05.2015 and numbered 29371. The decision read:

"As a result of the audits conducted in relation to Bank Asya (the Bank) within the scope of the Banking Law No. 5411 (the Law), it has been decided to transfer the Bank's shareholding rights, excluding dividends, and the management and supervision of the Bank to the Savings Deposit Insurance Fund in accordance with the provision of subparagraph (b) of the first paragraph of Article 71 of the Law for the purpose of partial or complete transfer, sale or merger, provided that the loss is deducted from the capital of the existing shareholders (it is revealed that the continuation of its activities poses a danger to the rights of deposit and participation fund holders and the confidence and stability of the financial system)."

At this stage, the SDIF did not yet revoke Bank Asya's banking licence and stated that it did not pose any risk to depositors.

- Muhiddin Gülal, President of the Savings Deposit Insurance Fund (SDIF), announced on 26 February 2016 that they plan to sell Bank Asya by 29 May, and that they will liquidate the bank if it cannot be sold.

According to The Banking Regulation and Supervision Agency (BRSA= BDDK in Turkish) board decision published on the website of the Banking Regulation and Supervision Agency and in the Official Gazette on 23 July 2016, Bank Asya's operating licence was cancelled.

- On 16 November 2017, with the decision of Istanbul 1st Commercial Court of First Instance dated 16.11.2017 and numbered 2017/41 E., Bank Asya was declared bankrupt.

Following the Justice and Development Party (AKP) government's restrictions on the Gülen movement and Bank Asya in Turkey since 2013, and particularly after the 2016 Turkish coup attempt, Bank Asya customers faced numerous rights violations. After the coup attempt, the Gülen movement was accused of plotting the coup and declared a terrorist organization by the Erdoğan regime. Consequently, being a partner, employee, or customer of Bank Asya became a significant factor in determining membership in the organization by government politicians and members of the judiciary. People, not blamed of any offenses, were accused of being members of a terrorist organization just because they worked for the bank, had an account or used bank's credit card and other banking services and they were subjected to criminal investigation.
