= Emlak Kredi Bank =

Former Turkish real estate credit bank

- Company type: Bank
- Industry: Financial services
- Founded: September 1, 1946
- Defunct: July 3, 2001
- Headquarters: Ankara, Turkey
- Products: Banking-Construction
- Owner: Turkish government

Emlak Kredi Bank (Turkish: Türkiye Emlak Kredi Bankası) was a former Turkish public bank specialized in real estate that operated from 1946 until the government liquidated the bank in 2001.

== History ==
It was founded on 1 September 1946 with a founding capital of 110,000,000 TRY. A former bank named Emlak ve Eytam Bank was merged into Emlak Kredi Bank. In the following years, the number of its branch offices was increased to 307. Some of the important housing projects financed by the bank were in Ankara, Istanbul, Eskişehir, Edirne, İzmir, Urfa, Çankırı and Diyarbakır. The bank also built a number of notable public buildings such as the central headquarters of Central Bank of the Republic of Turkey central headquarters of Turkish Radio and Television Corporation, public housing of Turkish parliament members etc.

Beginning by 1980s, some other small banks were merged into Emlak Kredi. On 8 January 1988, Anadolu Bank (which itself was a merger of two former banks) and on 29 November 1992, Denzicilik Bank were merged to Emlak Kredi Bank.

However, on 3 July 2001, the government decided to liquidate the bank. Its shares were bought by Ziraat Bank and Halkbank, two other public banks.
