= ING (Turkey) =

Turkish subsidiary of the ING Group

ING Türkiye
- Trade name: ING
- Type: A.Ş.
- Industry: Financial services
- Founded: 1984; 42 years ago
- Headquarters: Istanbul, Turkey
- Key people: John T. McCarthy (CEO)
- Owner: OYAK (1993–2007); ING Group (2007—present)
- Number of employees: 3,442 (2020)
- Website: ing.com.tr

ING is the Turkish subsidiary of the ING Group, an international banking company. The bank was formerly known as Oyak Bank, which became part of ING Group in December 2007. It provides retail and commercial banking services to individuals and businesses in Turkey, together with related financial products such as insurance and asset management. It was a financial subsidiary of OYAK Holding (Turkish Armed Forces Pension Fund) between 1993 and 2007.

== History ==
US-based First National Bank of Boston opened a branch in Istanbul, Turkey in 1984. The bank has operated independently since 1990 with three companies owning majority stakes: Alarko, Cerrahoğlu and OYAK.

The bank's name changed to Turkish Boston Bank A.Ş. again in 1991 and then OYAK purchased the other shares, becoming the only shareholder of the bank. Finally, the bank was again renamed to Oyak Bank in 1996.

In 2002, Sümerbank merged into Oyak Bank, which had over 300 branches around Turkey. The bank has a branch in Ireland and another one in Germany.
