= Turkey Wealth Fund =

Sovereign wealth fund of Turkey

- Native name: Türkiye Varlık Fonu
- Industry: Sovereign wealth fund
- Founded: 26 August 2016; 10 years ago
- Headquarters: Istanbul, Turkey
- Key people: President Recep Tayyip Erdoğan (Chairman); Salim Arda Ermut (CEO)
- AUM: ▲US$ 443 billion (2025)
- Owner: Republic of Türkiye
- Number of employees: 150+ (2025)
- Website: www.tvf.com.tr

The Türkiye Wealth Fund (TWF; Turkish: Türkiye Varlık Fonu, TVF) is the sovereign wealth fund of Türkiye. It was established on 26 August 2016 under Law No. 6741, with the purpose of contributing to the development of strategic investments, supporting large-scale infrastructure, and strengthening capital markets

As of 2025, its assets under management were estimated at more than US$443 billion, placing the fund among the 10 largest sovereign wealth funds in the world, according to the Sovereign Wealth Fund Institute.

TWF's operations have been characterized as secretive and opaque.

== History ==
TWF was officially founded on 26 August 2016. In its early years, TWF received the transfer of major state-owned enterprises, including Turkish Airlines, Ziraat Bank, Halkbank, the national postal operator PTT, Türk Telekom, and Turkish Petroleum Corporation. These holdings provided the fund with a broad base in sectors such as transport, finance, energy, and telecommunications. During the COVID-19 pandemic in 2020, the fund acted as a stabilizing institution by engaging in market-support measures and liquidity initiatives.

By the mid-2020s, it had become more active internationally, launching sector-specific investment vehicles such as a dedicated technology fund to support the country's innovation ecosystem.

=== 2017-2019 changes ===
After the 2017 Turkish constitutional referendum, the Prime Ministry of Türkiye was abolished. In accordance with this change, TWF law was changed to allow the President of Türkiye to become the chairman of the TWF and to appoint the CEO, Vice Chairman and board members. On 12 September, President Erdoğan became the chairman of the fund. He also appointed Zafer Sönmez, formerly of Malaysia's government investment vehicle Khazanah Nasional from September 2012 until September 2018, as Senior Vice President & Head. Erdoğan's son-in-law Berat Albayrak was named as his deputy on the board of the sovereign wealth fund.

=== 2020s ===
In January 2020, TWF acquired an additional 10% stake in Borsa Istanbul (BIST) from the European Bank for Reconstruction and Development (EBRD). The EBRD had made use of its rights to sell in October 2019 after the appointment of Mehmet Hakan Atilla, who was convicted in the US for helping Iran evade US sanctions, as chief executive of the stock exchange.

In April 2020, TWF Financial Investments was founded with previously government owned shares of insurance companies. In September 2020, the fund completed the acquisition of non-government shares in several insurance companies and consolidated them through mergers. This led to the creation of Türkiye Sigorta, formed by combining Güneş Sigorta, Halk Sigorta, and Ziraat Sigorta, and Türkiye Hayat ve Emeklilik, established through the merger of Vakıf Emeklilik ve Hayat, Halk Hayat ve Emeklilik, and Ziraat Hayat ve Emeklilik. The transactions constituted the largest insurance merger in Turkish M&A history.

On 18 June 2020, the fund agreed to acquire a 26.2% stake in Turkcell from Telia Company and Çukurova Holding for US$1.801 billion. The deal included US$196 million paid to Telia and a US$1.605 billion loan from Ziraat Bank to finance the transaction. On 22 September 2020, following amendments to Turkcell’s Articles of Association, TWF gained the right to appoint five of the nine members of the company's board of directors.

On 26 November 2020, TWF announced the sale of a 10% stake in Borsa Istanbul to the Qatar Investment Authority (QIA), a stake it had previously acquired from the European Bank for Reconstruction and Development (EBRD). The deal was valued at US$200 million, after which TWF retained an 80.6% shareholding. The following day, TWF's Vice Chairman Berat Albayrak announced his resignation, shortly after his resignation from the Ministry of Finance.

On 10 March 2022, TWF acquired a controlling stake in Türk Telekom for US$1.65 billion in order to resolve ownership handover issues expected in 2026. In December 2022, the fund purchased a minority stake in steel producer Kardemir, paying US$35.2 million for 50.3 million shares in the company.

In February 2025, negotiations for the proposed operation of the Alsancak Port in İzmir by Abu Dhabi Ports were canceled after the Turkish government ended the talks. The port remains part of TWF's portfolio and is operated by the Turkish State Railways (TCDD).

== Governance ==
TWF was established under Law No. 6741, which provides its legal foundation and sets out its management framework. Unlike traditional state budgetary institutions, the fund is organized as a joint-stock company under private law. This arrangement allows greater operational flexibility while also creating a distinct regulatory environment.

The governance framework of the fund includes several oversight mechanisms. Its accounts are subject to independent external audits, and expert committees provide further evaluation. In addition, the fund is required to report to national authorities. While these measures provide a degree of accountability, commentators have noted that the fund operates with less transparency than some other public institutions and remains partly removed from routine public oversight. On the international level, TWF has stated its alignment with the Santiago Principles of the International Forum of Sovereign Wealth Funds.

With estimated assets of more than US$300 billion, the Türkiye Wealth Fund is ranked among the world's largest sovereign wealth funds. Unlike many resource-backed sovereign wealth funds, such as Norway's Government Pension Fund and the Abu Dhabi Investment Authority, the Türkiye Wealth Fund is primarily capitalized through the transfer of state-owned enterprises and financing operations. While it owns companies active in petroleum, liquefied natural gas, and mining, it does not receive direct transfers of natural resource revenues. This structure has led to discussion of whether it should be regarded as a state investment holding company as well as a sovereign wealth fund.

TWF's model places it alongside other large non-resource-backed funds such as Temasek Holdings in Singapore, Khazanah Nasional in Malaysia, and the Indonesia Investment Authority (INA), which manage national assets and state-owned enterprises rather than natural resource surpluses.

=== Management ===
Chairman & CEO
Mehmet Bostan (2 November 2016 – 8 September 2017)
Himmet Karadağ (8 September 2017 – 12 September 2018)
Chairman	Vice Chairman	CEO
Recep Tayyip Erdoğan (12 September 2018-)	Berat Albayrak (12 September 2018 – 27 November 2020)	Zafer Sönmez (12 September 2018 – 9 March 2021)
Recep Tayyip Erdoğan (12 September 2018-)	vacant (27 November 2020 – 31 January 2021)	Zafer Sönmez (12 September 2018 – 9 March 2021)
Recep Tayyip Erdoğan (12 September 2018-)	Erişah Arıcan (31 January 2021-)	Zafer Sönmez (12 September 2018 – 9 March 2021)
Recep Tayyip Erdoğan (12 September 2018-)	Erişah Arıcan (31 January 2021-)	Salim Arda Ermut (9 March 2021-)

== International partnerships ==
Türkiye Wealth Fund has established a series of formal cooperation agreements intended to promote cross-border investment and strategic partnerships. In March 2017, TWF signed a memorandum of understanding (MoU) with the Russian Direct Investment Fund (RDIF) to create a Russia–Türkiye Investment Fund, into which each party would contribute up to US$500 million, with a focus on sectors such as healthcare and tourism. In November 2020, the fund entered into an MoU with the Qatar Investment Authority(QIA) concerning a 10% stake in Borsa Istanbul, laying the groundwork for potential governance collaboration. In November 2021, TWF and the Abu Dhabi Developmental Holding Company (ADQ) signed a strategic partnership agreement aimed at joint efforts in fields such as technology, logistics, capital markets, and other sectoral initiatives. Most recently, in April 2025, TWF concluded an MoU with the Iraq Development Fund (DFI), targeting collaborative investment in sectors including renewable energy, infrastructure, transportation, agriculture, and fintech.

=== Türkiye Technology Fund ===
In 2022, Türkiye Wealth Fund established the Türkiye Technology Fund (TTF) together with Abu Dhabi Developmental Holding Company (ADQ). The fund was launched with an initial size of US$300 million and a target of US$1 billion. At the time of its creation, it was described as the largest technology-focused venture capital fund in Türkiye. The TTF is structured with both a fund-of-funds (FoF) component, which invests in domestic and international venture capital funds, and a direct investment arm that provides financing to Turkish start-ups and technology companies at different stages of development. The fund's investment focus includes information technology, telecommunications, and other high-growth sectors.

== Capital markets and financing ==
Türkiye Wealth Fund has raised funding through both conventional and Islamic capital market instruments. In February 2024 it issued a US$500 million Eurobond maturing in 2029, the fund's first international Eurobond issuance. In October 2024 the fund issued a US$750 million sukuk al-ijarah with a tenor of just over five years. The issuance was oversubscribed, with investor orders totaling nearly US$7 billion, approximately 14 times the amount offered.

In November 2024, TWF secured a US$150 million murabaha financing agreement with Dubai Islamic Bank, featuring a five-year maturity. The following year, in March 2025, the fund arranged a €1.1 billion syndicated loan, split between euro and dollar tranches, without a sovereign guarantee. In August 2025, TWF completed a US$600 million, five-year murabaha deal with a consortium led by Kuwait Finance House, bringing its Islamic finance borrowings to a cumulative total exceeding US$1.8 billion.

Between early 2024 and mid-2025, Türkiye Wealth Fund raised close to US$5 billion through a combination of Eurobonds, sukuk, murabaha agreements, and syndicated loans.

== Holdings ==
Company	Operating area	Stake
Borsa Istanbul	Financial services	80.6%
BOTAŞ	Energy	100%
Çaykur	Agriculture and food	100%
Eti Maden	Mining	100%
Halkbank	Financial services	91.5%
Port of İzmir (Alsancak)	Transport and logistics	100%
Kardemir	Mining	4.41%
Kayseri Şeker	Agriculture and food	9.41%
Türk Altın Holding	Mining	
PTT	Transport and logistics	100%
TPAO	Energy	100%
Türkşeker	Agriculture and food	100%
Türk Telekom	Technology and telecom	61.68%
Turkcell	Technology and telecom	26.2%
TÜRKSAT	Technology and telecom	100%
Turkish Airlines	Transport and logistics	49.12%
Türkiye Sigorta	Financial services	81.1%
Türkiye Katılım Sigorta	Financial services	100%
Türkiye Hayat ve Emeklilik	Financial services	92.64%
Türkiye Katılım Hayat	Financial services	100%
TWF AEL Electricity	Energy	100%
TWF Energy	Energy	100%
TWF Financial Investments	Financial services	100%
TWF IT and Communications	Technology and telecom	100%
TWF Refinery and Petrochemical	Energy	100%
TWF Technology Investments	Technology and telecom	100%
Türkiye Maden	Mining	100%
Türkiye Technology Fund	Technology and telecom	100%
Türk Tarım	Agriculture and food	49%
VakıfBank	Financial services	74.8%
Ziraat Bank	Financial services	100%

Real estate:

- The fund also holds various real estate assets, most notably the Istanbul Finance Center (Turkish: İstanbul Finans Merkezi), a major commercial and financial hub project in Istanbul.

Licenses:

- Millî Piyango (for 49 years)
- Jockey Club of Türkiye (for 49 years)
