= Turkey Development Bank =

Turkish public bank

Kalkınma ve Yatırım Bankası A.Ş.
- Formerly: Devlet Sanayi ve İşçi Yatırım Bankası
- Type: Anonim şirket
- Industry: Public development bank
- Predecessors: Republic of Turkey Tourism Bank
- Founded: November 11, 1975; 50 years ago in Ankara
- Founder: Ministry of Industry and Technology
- Headquarters: Istanbul, Turkey
- Area served: Mostly Turkey
- Key people: Raci Kaya, chairman of the board
- Owner: Ministry of Treasury and Finance
- Number of employees: 401 (2025)
- Website: kalkinma.com.tr

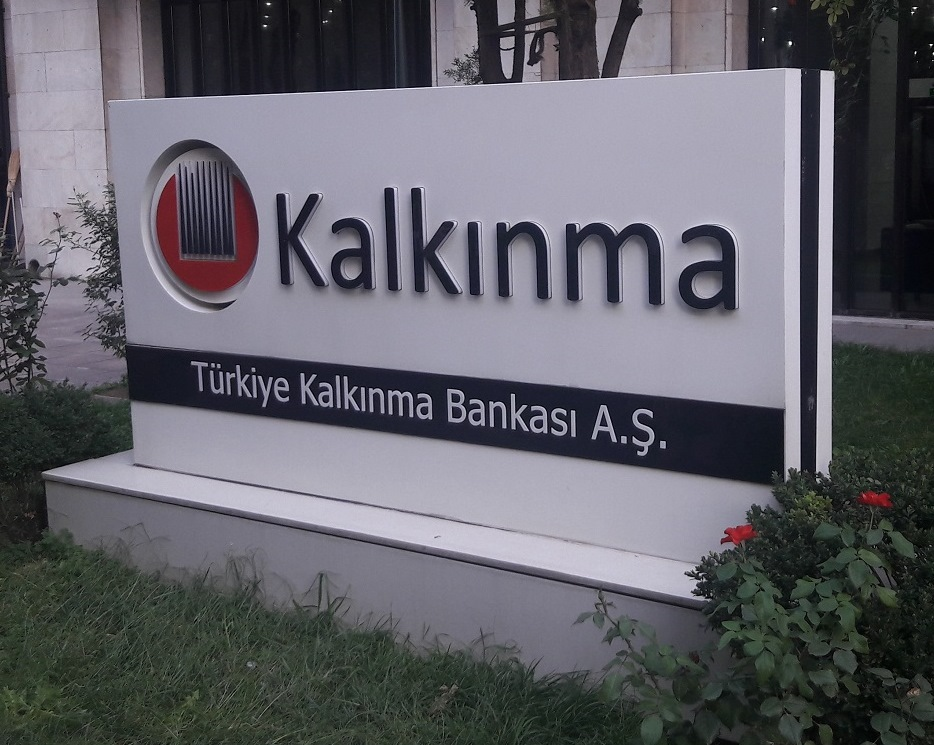
The entrance of the bank from its former headquarter in Ankara

Turkey Development Bank is a Turkish public development bank.

== History ==
The bank was founded on November 11, 1975, as Devlet Sanayi ve İşçi Yatırım Bankası A.Ş. (DESİYAB, English: State Industry and Worker Investment Bank), a part of Ministry of Industry and Technology. It was renamed on June 22, 1988, as Türkiye Kalkınma Yatırım Bankası In 1989, it was merged with Republic of Turkey Tourism Bank, and has started to operate in the field of tourism.

In 2018, the bank changed its name from Turkey Development Investment Bank to Development Investment Bank, which is its current name.
