= Ziraat Bank =

Turkish multinational bank

T.C. Ziraat Bankası A.Ş.

- Type: Public; Anonim Şirket
- Industry: Finance and Insurance
- Founded: November 20, 1863; 162 years ago
- Headquarters: Ümraniye, Istanbul, Turkey
- Number of locations: 1,773 branches (2018)
- Area served: Worldwide
- Key people: Burhaneddin Tanyeri (Chairman); Alpaslan Çakar (CEO)
- Products: Financial services, credit cards, consumer banking, corporate banking, investment banking, mortgage loans, private banking
- Revenue: ▲US$16.45 billion (2023)
- Operating income: ▲US$8.16 billion (2023)
- Net income: ▲US$3.43 billion (2023)
- Total assets: ▲US$89.34 billion (2023)
- Total equity: ▲US$12.84 billion (2023)
- Owner: Turkey Wealth Fund
- Number of employees: 25.904 (2023)
- Subsidiaries: List: Azer-Türk Bank ASC; Bileşim Alternatif Dağıtım Kanalları ve Ödeme Sistemleri A.Ş.; Kazakhstan-Ziraat International Bank; Turkish Ziraat Bank Bosnia d.d.; Turkmen Turkish Joint Stock Commercial Bank (TTJSC Bank); Uzbekistan-Turkish Bank (UTBANK); Yönetimi A.Ş. Ziraat Teknoloji A.Ş.; Ziraat Bank Azerbaijan OJSC; Ziraat Bank (Moscow) CJSC; Ziraat Bank International AG; Ziraat Banka AD Skopje; Ziraat Finansal Kiralama A.Ş.; Ziraat Hayat ve Emeklilik A.Ş.; Ziraat Katılım; Ziraat Portföy; Ziraat Sigorta A.Ş.; Ziraat Yatırım Menkul Değerler A.Ş.
- Website: www.ziraatbank.com.tr/en

Ziraat Bankası (lit. 'Agriculture Bank') is a Turkish public bank founded in 1863. The bank provides commercial loan support to companies and tradesmen, as well as personal loans such as consumer loans, vehicle loans and housing loans.

== History ==
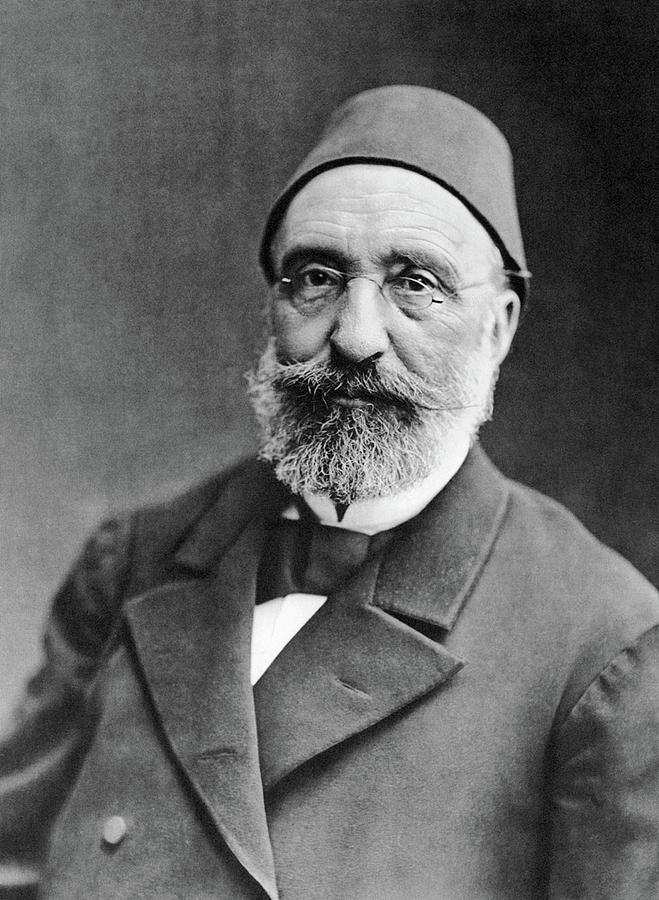
Midhat Pasha, founder of Ziraat Bank and the 190th Ottoman Grand Vizier, still has his portrait in all branches of the bank today

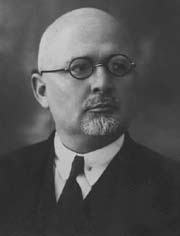
Mehmet Sabit Sağıroğlu, Ziraat Bank chief executive officer in the early days of the Turkish Republic

During the first half of the 19th century, with the adoption of western models of trade and finance, foreign banks began their activities in the Ottoman Empire. At that period, there was not enough capital to found a national banking system and no one could mention the existence of national banks as a source of capital. This situation was more harmful to farmers because they made up the majority of the population, and since they did not have any institutional financial structure to which to apply, they had to borrow money from the usurers at high-interest rates.

Under these conditions, the governor of Niš province of the Ottoman Empire, Midhat Pasha (1822–1884) began to take the first steps to overcome these difficulties in 1863 and achieved the reorganization of Memleket Sandığı (English: Homeland Funds), which became a law with Homeland Funds Regulations in 1867. Homeland Funds was the first agricultural financial institution founded by the state and operated with a state guarantee.

In 1888, Homeland Funds was renamed Ziraat Bankası (English: Agriculture Bank), and Ziraat Bank's head office in Istanbul began to function. The Greco-Turkish War between 1919 and 1922 affected the bank's policy. The Greek forces opened a Ziraat Bank Management Center in İzmir and occupied branches and funds were taken to the new center's management. On the other hand, the Turkish Grand National Assembly charged the Ankara branch of Ziraat Bank with the management of branches and funds. With the Liberation of İzmir by Turkish forces on September 9, 1922, the İzmir organization was re-unified with the Ankara branch; and on October 23, the Istanbul organization too was re-unified with the Ankara branch. After the Turkish War of Independence ended in late 1923, Ziraat Bank became a united entity once again. Since the 1930s, Ziraat played an important role in financing agricultural mechanisation in Turkey, which in the postwar period benefitted from support from the Marshall Plan.

In 1993, Ziraat Bank Moscow, Kazakhstan Ziraat International Bank (KZI Bank), Turkmen Turkish Commercial Bank (TTC Bank), and Uzbekistan Turkish Bank (UT Bank) and in 2008 Ziraat Bank Greece were founded and started to operate.

In Bosnia and Herzegovina, ZiraatBank BH d.d. Sarajevo, or simply Ziraat Banka, was founded in 1996 as the first bank in Bosnia after the Bosnian war with foreign capital.

In 2001, Emlak Bankası wholly merged into Ziraat Bank.

In 2023, Ziraat Bank moved to its new headquarters located in the Istanbul Finance Center. The new headquarters, designed by the New York-based architecture firm KPF, consists of two towers with 40 and 46 floors.

== See also ==
- Turkey Wealth Fund
- List of banks in Turkey
