= İzmir Economic Congress =

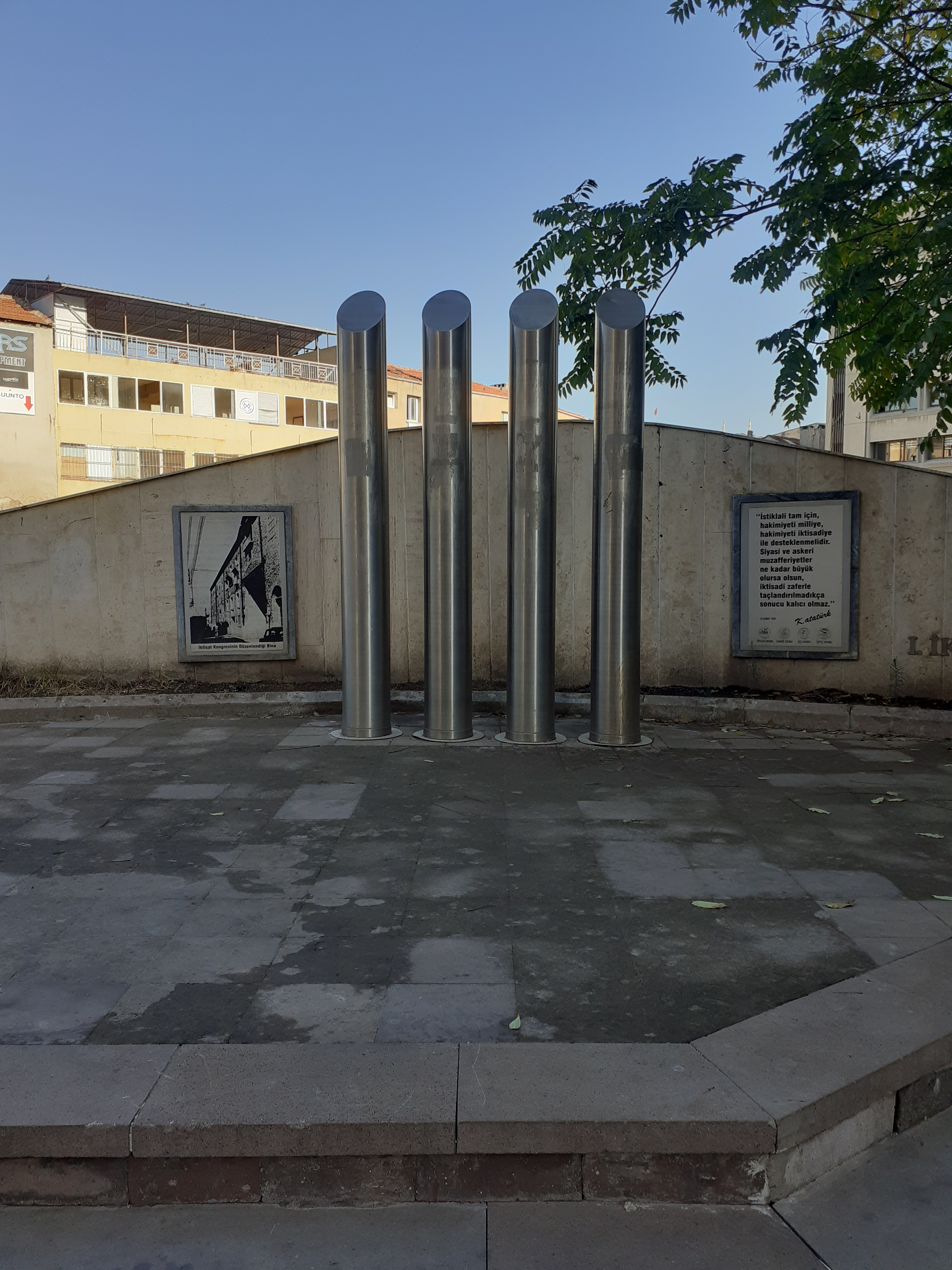
Monument of Izmir Economics Congress in Konak

İzmir Economic Congress (Turkish: İzmir İktisat Kongresi) was held in İzmir, Turkey between 17 February and 4 March 1923, shortly after the end of the Turkish War of Independence and during the interval between the two conferences that led to the Lausanne Treaty the same year. The conference was held in order to emphasize the importance of Turkish economic development, as the country had been shattered by years of war. Early Turkish economic policy was articulated at this congress.

The newborn republic adopted a mixed economy—as advised by Mustafa Kemal Atatürk. Mustafa Kemal's statements, made in specific political contexts, have long been quoted by statist economists in Turkey in an effort to justify the state's role in economy.

A second Congress under the same name and with stressed references to the first was held in 1981 after the 1980 Turkish coup d'état, and a third (named Economic Congress of Turkey) was organized by Turkey's State Planning Organization (T.C. Başbakanlık Devlet Planlama Teşkilatı) in 2004, both times also in İzmir, although these last two are far from having the historic significance of the first.

An exhibition of various commercial products organized simultaneously to the Congress, in İzmir's Hamparsumyan House, which was used as storehouse for the Ottoman Bank at the time, is considered to be the precursor of today's İzmir International Fair.

== See also ==
- Statism
