= Banks Association of Turkey =

Organisation for banks in the Republic of Turkey

- Türkiye Bankalar Birliği
- Abbreviation: TBB
- Formation: 1958; 68 years ago
- Type: Professional association
- Headquarters: Istanbul
- Members: Institute of International Finance; European Banking Federation; Asian Bankers Federation
- Key people: Naim Talu
- Website: www.tbb.org.tr

The Banks Association of Turkey (sometimes referred as, the Turkish Banks Association) or Türkiye Bankalar Birliği (TBB) is an organisation for banks in Turkey. Membership is compulsory for commercial and investment banks operating in Turkey. Its activities include conducting policy-related research and collecting statistics. As of April 2016, it has 47 members.

TBB has a General Assembly, which consist of representatives from member banks. General Assembly elects Board of Directors proportional to banks' year-end total assets. 8 members are elected by top 10 commercial banks, 3 members are elected by following 8 banks, 1 member elected by others and 1 member elected by investment banks.

Participation banks, which operate as Islamic banking, are not obliged to be a TBB member, but obliged to join a similar association, The Participation Banks Association of Turkey.
