= Savings Deposit Insurance Fund of Turkey =

Turkish banking governing body

Savings Deposit Insurance Fund
- Tasarruf Mevduatı Sigorta Fonu
- Logo of the Savings Deposit Insurance Fund of Turkey

Agency overview
- Formed: 1983
- Superseding agency: Independent
- Jurisdiction: Turkey
- Headquarters: Istanbul, Turkey
- Agency executive: Fatin Rüştü Karakaş, Chairman
- Website: www.tmsf.org.tr

The Savings Deposit Insurance Fund of Turkey (Turkish: Tasarruf Mevduatı Sigorta Fonu), a.k.a. TMSF in abbreviated form, is the governing body concerned with matters of fund management and insurance in the Turkish banking system. In recent years, it has expanded its remit to include the administration and sale of assets belonging to companies placed under state trusteeship. The TMSF has become a major state holding entity, temporarily managing more than a thousand companies across multiple sectors as part of legal and financial investigations.

The body was founded in 1933 with the name Deposit Protection Act (Turkish: Mevduatı Koruma Kanunu). In 1960, the name was changed to Banks Liquidation Fund (Turkish: Bankalar Tasfiye Fonu). The current name was adopted in 1983.

TMSF is also involved in the media industry, and owns at least one asset each for every newspaper, pay television, television and radio station. In 2013, TMSF acquired some assets from Çukurova Media Group after the company was forced to sell due to tax debts.

The institution was initially overseen by the Central Bank of Turkey, however, it later became attached to the Prime Minister's office, and later, to the President's office.

== Expansion of mandate and corporate takeovers ==
Since the mid-2010s, the TMSF’s remit has extended well beyond its original function of protecting bank deposits and managing failed financial institutions. Following the 2016 coup attempt in Turkey, the fund was tasked with taking control of companies suspected of links to the coup plot, and with selling or liquidating their assets.

By 2025, the number of businesses under TMSF trusteeship had grown substantially. Media reports indicated that the fund was administering more than 1,000 companies across diverse sectors, including media, finance, energy, and manufacturing. Among the firms placed under TMSF control were the conglomerates Can Holding, Ciner Group, and Istanbul Gold Refinery.

New legal provisions introduced in 2025 allowed courts to place companies under TMSF administration on the basis of “strong suspicion” of financial crimes such as money laundering. This development marked a significant expansion of the fund’s role from deposit insurance to temporary state trusteeship of private-sector assets under investigation.

== See also ==
- Banking Regulation and Supervision Agency
- List of financial supervisory authorities by country
