= Banking Regulation and Supervision Agency =

- Established: 23 June 1999; 27 years ago
- Headquarters: Şişli, Istanbul, Turkey
- Coordinates: 41°04′06″N 29°00′37″E
- Chairman: Şahap Kavcıoğlu
- Main organ: Executive Board
- Website: www.bddk.gov.tr/Home

The Banking Regulation and Supervision Agency (BRSA; Turkish: Bankacılık Düzenleme ve Denetleme Kurumu, BDDK) is a government agency in Turkey whose task is to regulate and supervise the banking system in the country. It aims to "provid[e] reliability and stability in financial markets", "ensur[e] the efficient running of the credit system", and protect consumer rights. Since June 2023, Şahap Kavcıoğlu serves as its chairman.

== See also ==
- Central Bank of the Republic of Turkey
- List of financial supervisory authorities by country
