= Outline of Turkey =

Overview of and topical guide to Turkey

The flag of Turkey

The location of Turkey

The following outline is provided as an overview of and topical guide to Turkey:

Turkey, officially the Republic of Türkiye, sovereign Eurasian country that stretches across the Anatolian peninsula in West Asia and Thrace (Rumelia) at the southeastern tip of the Balkan Peninsula in Southern Europe. Turkey is a democratic, secular, unitary, constitutional republic whose political system was established in 1923 under the leadership of Mustafa Kemal Atatürk, following the fall of the Ottoman Empire in the aftermath of World War I.

== General reference ==
Map of Turkey

- Pronunciation: /ˈtɜːr.ki/
- Common English country name: Turkey
- Official English country name: The Republic of Türkiye
- Common endonym(s), i.e., in Turkish: Türkiye
- Official endonym(s): Türkiye Cumhuriyeti
- Adjectival(s): Turkish
- Demonym(s): Turks (in Turkish language: Türkler)
- Etymology: Name of Turkey
- International rankings of Turkey
- ISO country codes: TR, TUR, 792
- ISO region codes: See ISO 3166-2:TR
- Internet country code top-level domain: .tr

== Geography of Turkey ==
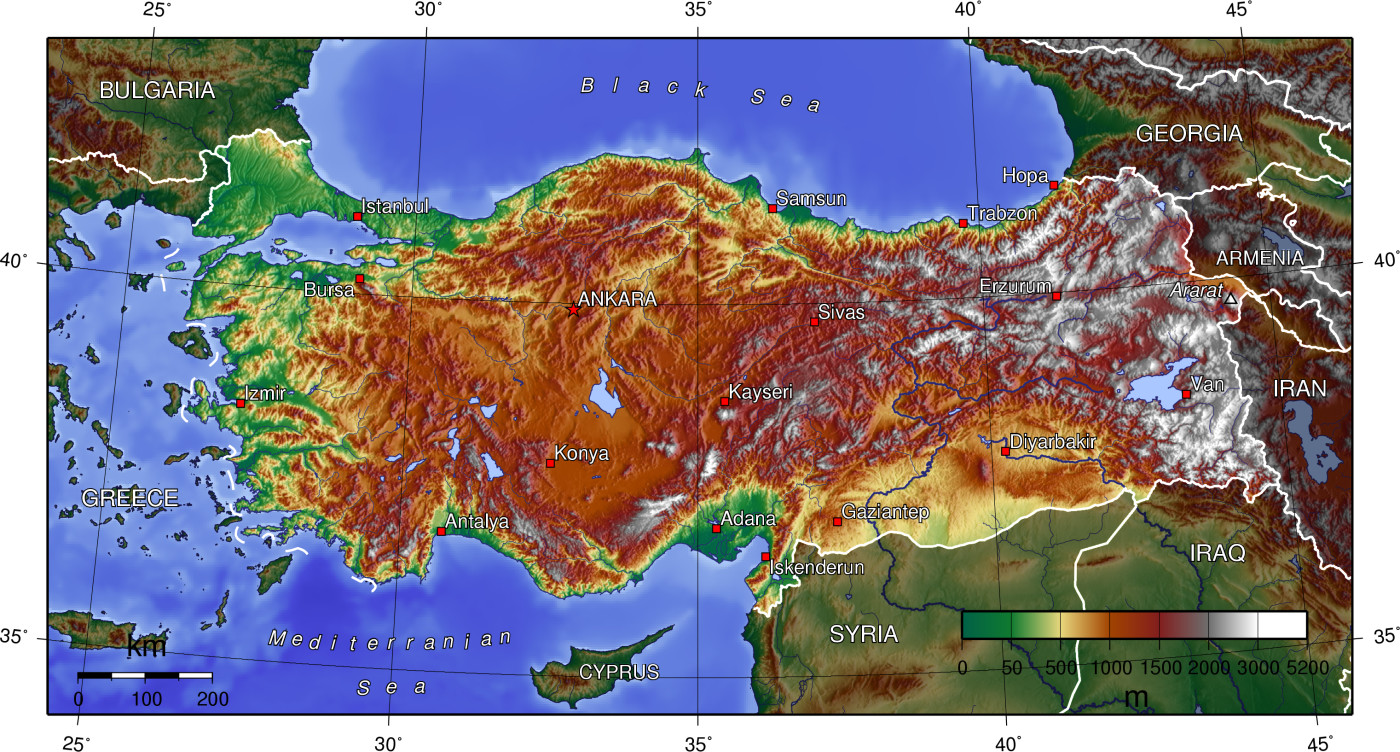
Turkey is a mountainous country.

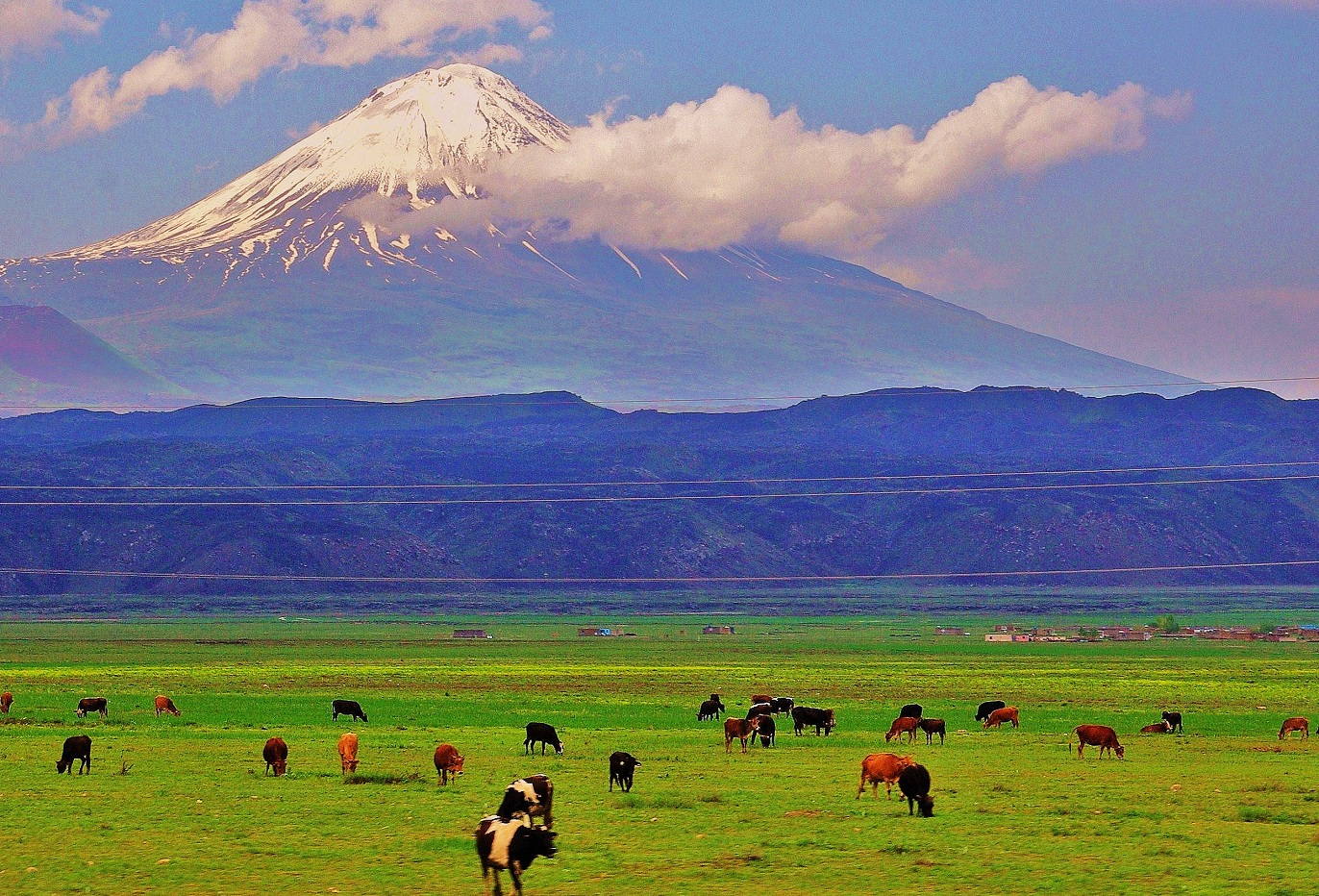
Little Ararat is in the Eastern Anatolia region.

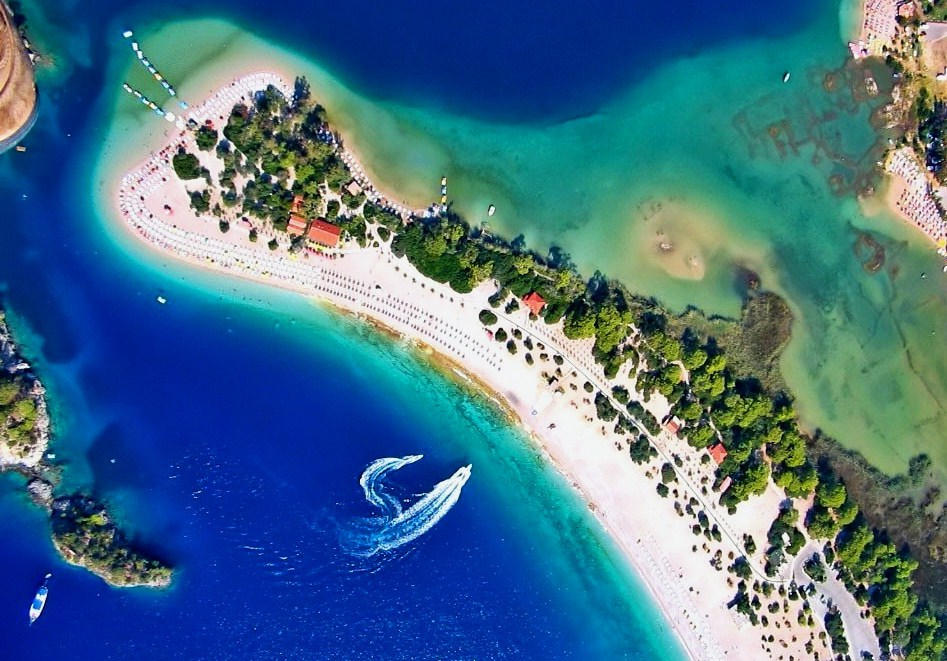
Turkey has a coastline of 7,200km.

- Turkey is: a country
- Location:
  - Northern Hemisphere and Eastern Hemisphere
  - Eurasia
    - Asia (except Thrace)
      - Southwest Asia
    - Europe
      - Southeast Europe
  - Time zone
    - Turkey Standard Time (UTC+03:00), since 2016
    - Eastern European Time (UTC+02:00) Eastern Daylight Time (UTC+03:00), until 2016.
  - Extreme points of Turkey
    - High: Mount Ararat 5,137 m (16,854 ft)
    - Low: Mediterranean Sea and Black Sea 0 m
  - Land boundaries: 2,648 km (1645 mi)

Syria (outline) 822 km (511 mi)
Iran (outline) 499 km (511 mi)
Iraq (outline) 352 km (310 mi)
Armenia (outline) 268 km (167 mi)
Georgia (outline) 252 km (157 mi)
Bulgaria (outline) 240 km (149 mi)
Greece (outline) 206 km (5128 mi)
Azerbaijan (outline) 9 km (6 mi)

- Coastline: 7,200 km (4,474 mi)

- Population of Turkey: 82 million 19th most populous country
- Area of Turkey: 783,562 km^{2} (302,455 sq mi) 36th most extensive country
- Atlas of Turkey
- Cities of Turkey, by population

=== Environment of Turkey ===
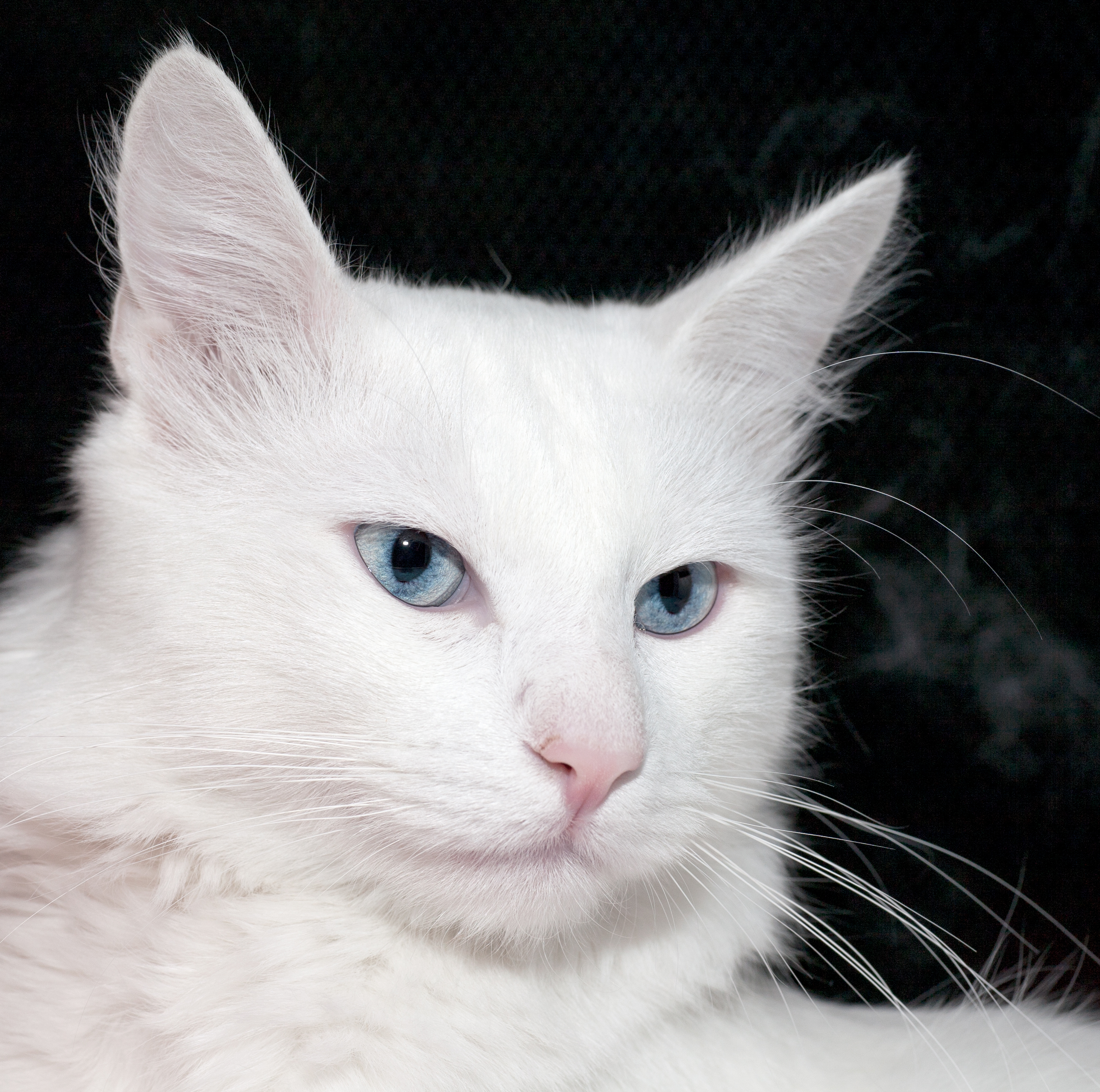
Turkish Angora is a distinctive breed from Ankara.

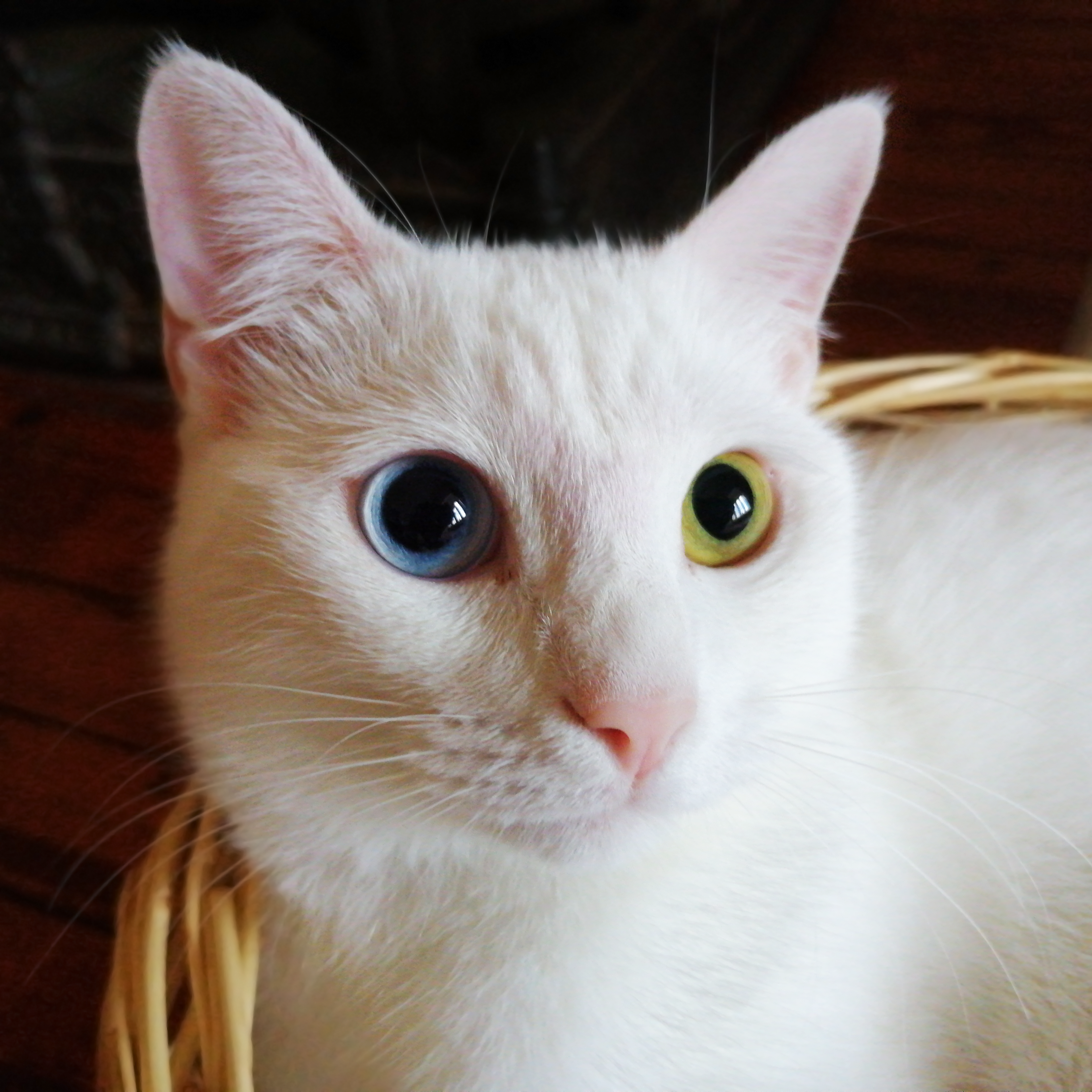
Van cat is a distinctive cat breed that enjoys swimming.

- Climate of Turkey
  - Climate change in Turkey
- Environmental issues in Turkey
- Ecoregions in Turkey
- Renewable energy in Turkey
  - Biofuel in Turkey
  - Geothermal power in Turkey
  - Solar power in Turkey
  - Wind power in Turkey
- Geology of Turkey
  - Earthquakes in Turkey
- National parks of Turkey
- Protected areas of Turkey
- Wildlife of Turkey
  - Flora of Turkey
  - Fauna of Turkey
    - Amphibians of Turkey
    - Birds of Turkey
    - Mammals of Turkey
    - Reptiles of Turkey

==== Geographic features of Turkey ====
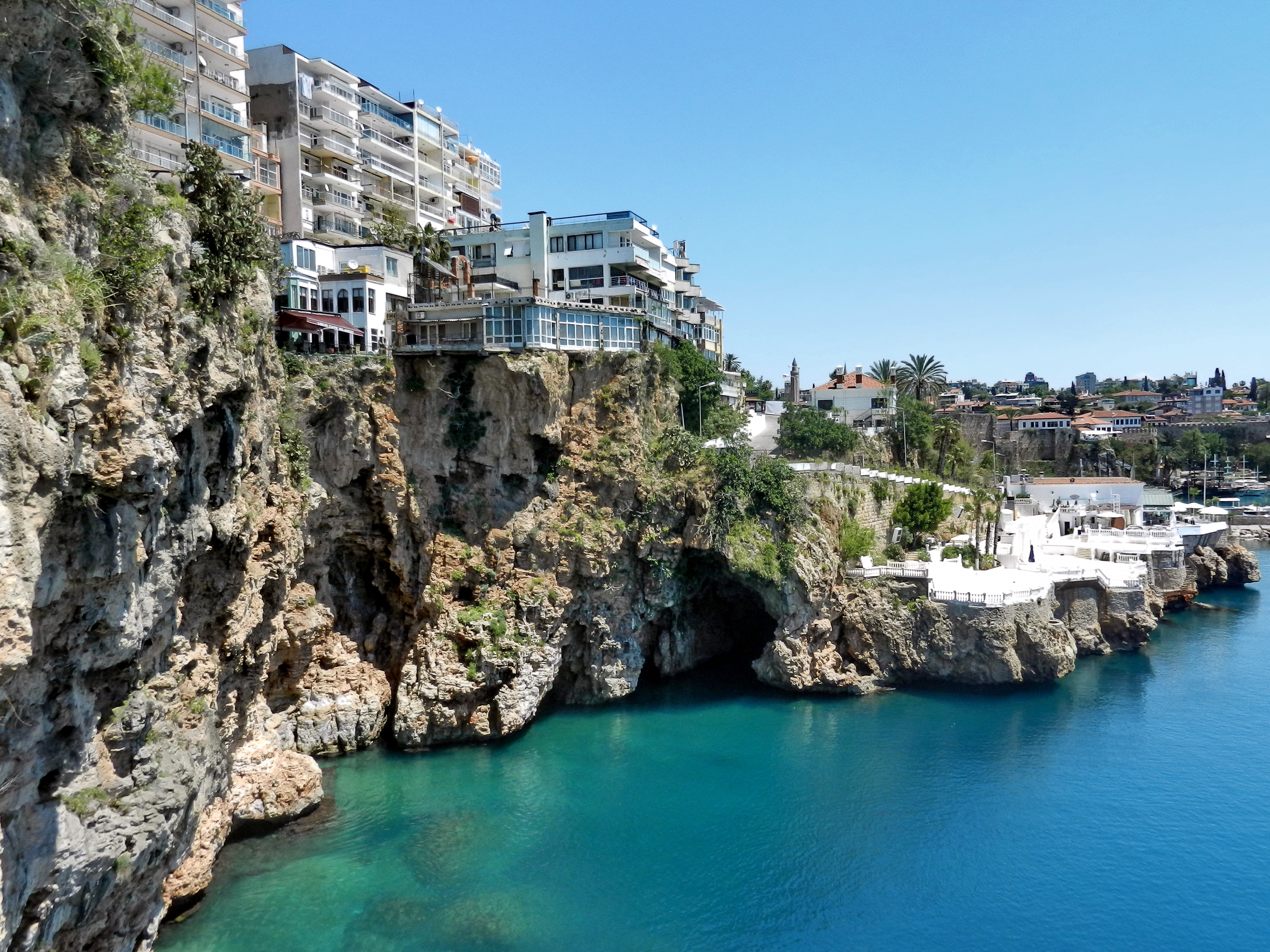
Antalya is in the Mediterranean Region.

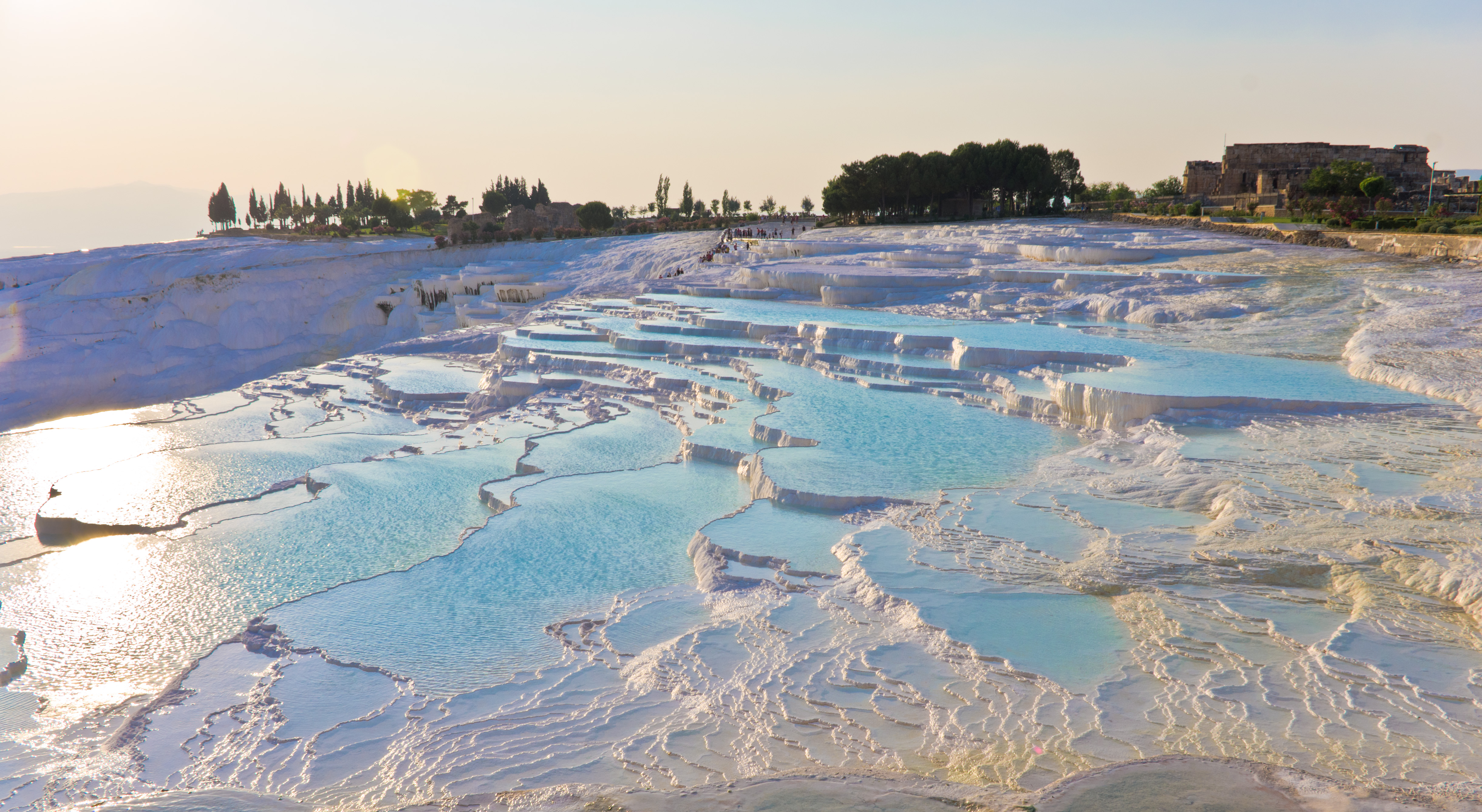
Pamukkale is World Heritage Site in the Aegean Region.

- Beaches of Turkey
- Caves of Turkey
- Glaciers of Turkey
- Islands of Turkey
- Lakes of Turkey
- Mountains of Turkey
  - Anti-Taurus Mountains
  - Pontic Mountains
  - Sultan Mountains
  - Taurus Mountains
  - Yalnızçam Mountains
  - Yıldız Mountains
  - Volcanoes of Turkey
- Rivers of Turkey
  - Büyük Menderes River
  - Euphrates
  - Kızılırmak
  - Meriç
  - Sakarya River
  - Tigris
- Waterfalls of Turkey
- Valleys of Turkey
- World Heritage Sites in Turkey

=== Regions of Turkey ===
- Aegean Region
- Black Sea Region
- Central Anatolia Region
- Eastern Anatolia Region
- Marmara Region
- Mediterranean Region
- Southeastern Anatolia Region

==== Ecoregions of Turkey ====
List of ecoregions in Turkey

==== Administrative divisions of Turkey ====
Administrative divisions of Turkey

- Provinces of Turkey
  - Districts of Turkey
    - Belde (semi-rural)
    - Villages (rural)
    - Neighbourhoods (urban)

===== Municipalities of Turkey =====
- Municipalities of Turkey
  - Capital of Turkey: Ankara
  - Metropolitan municipalities in Turkey
  - Cities of Turkey

==== Statistical divisions of Turkey ====
NUTS of Turkey

=== Demography of Turkey ===
Demographics of Turkey

- Census in Turkey

=== Climate of Turkey ===
Climate of Turkey

== Government and politics of Turkey ==
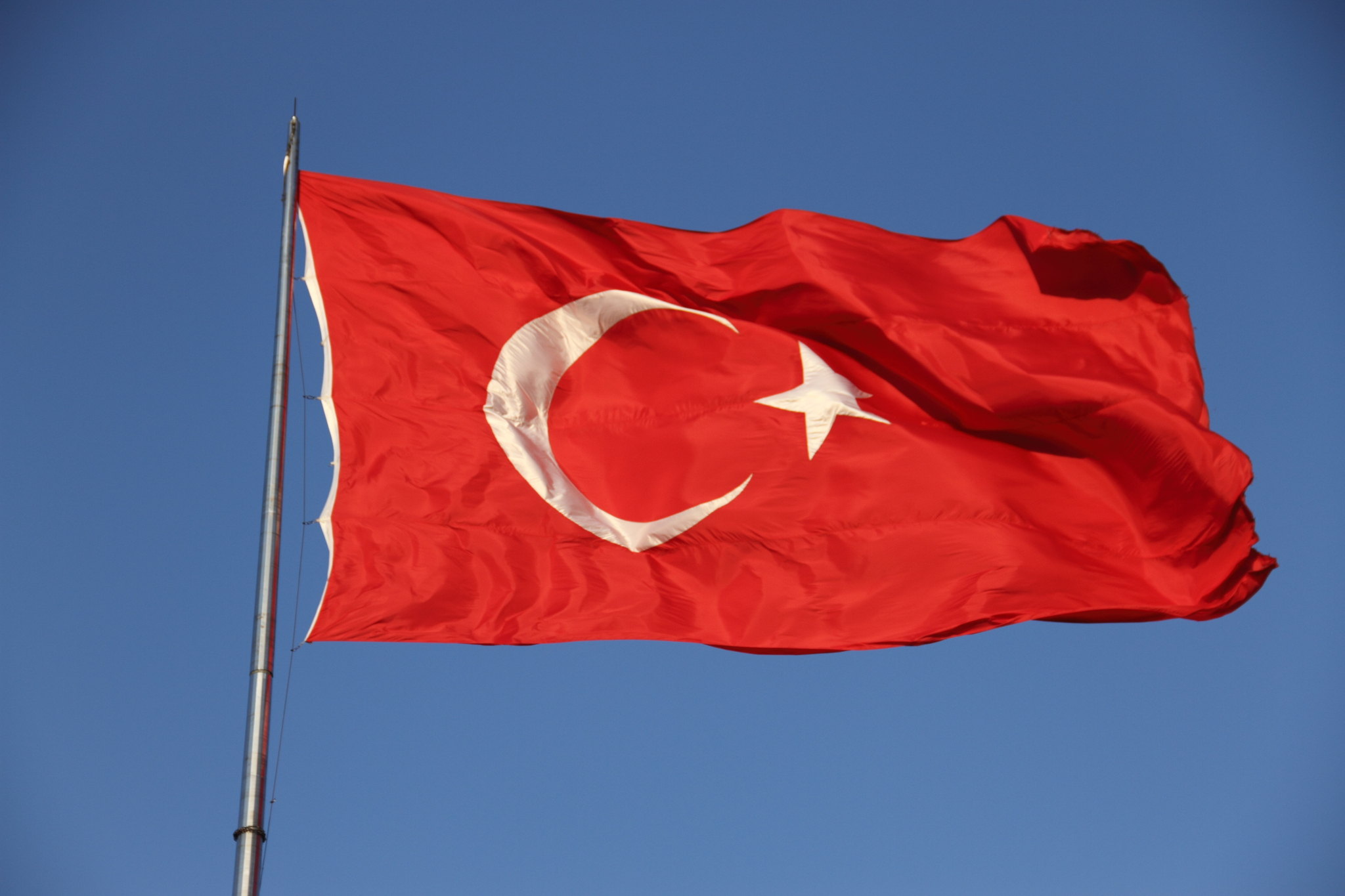
Turkish flag

- Form of government: Unitary presidential constitutional republic
- Capital of Turkey: Ankara
- Flag of Turkey
- Corruption in Turkey
- Elections in Turkey
- Political parties in Turkey
  - Justice and Development Party (AKP)
  - Republican People's Party (CHP)
  - Peoples' Democratic Party (HDP)
  - Nationalist Movement Party (MHP)
  - Good Party
  - Worker's Party
  - Democracy and Progress Party
  - Communist Party
  - Green Party
  - Future Party
- Orders, decorations, and medals of Turkey
- Political divisions of Turkey
- Taxation in Turkey
- Voting rights in Turkey

=== National government ===
- Constitution of Turkey

==== Legislative branch ====
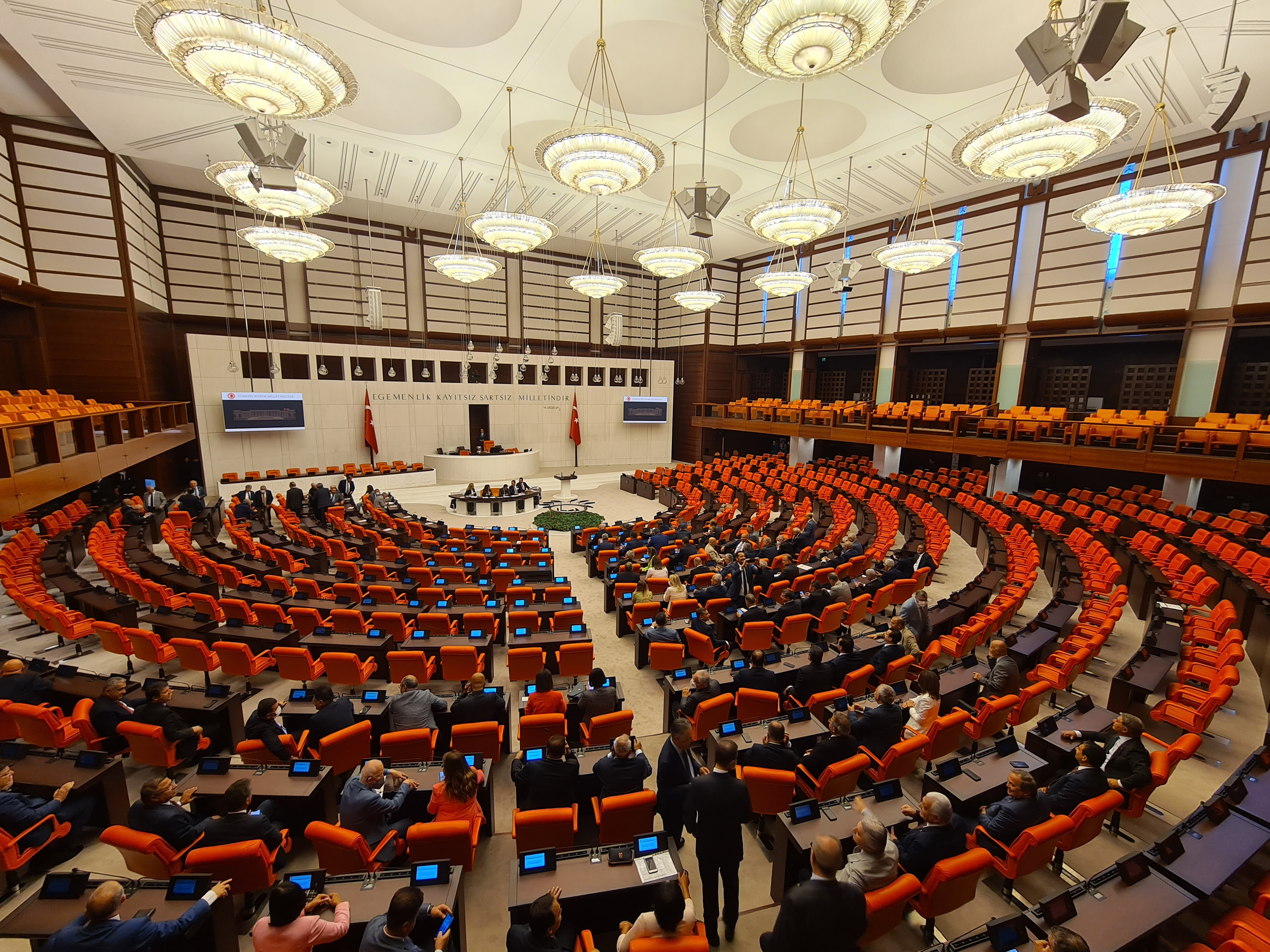
The Parliament of Turkey

- Parliament of Turkey
  - Speaker of the Grand National Assembly

==== Executive branch ====
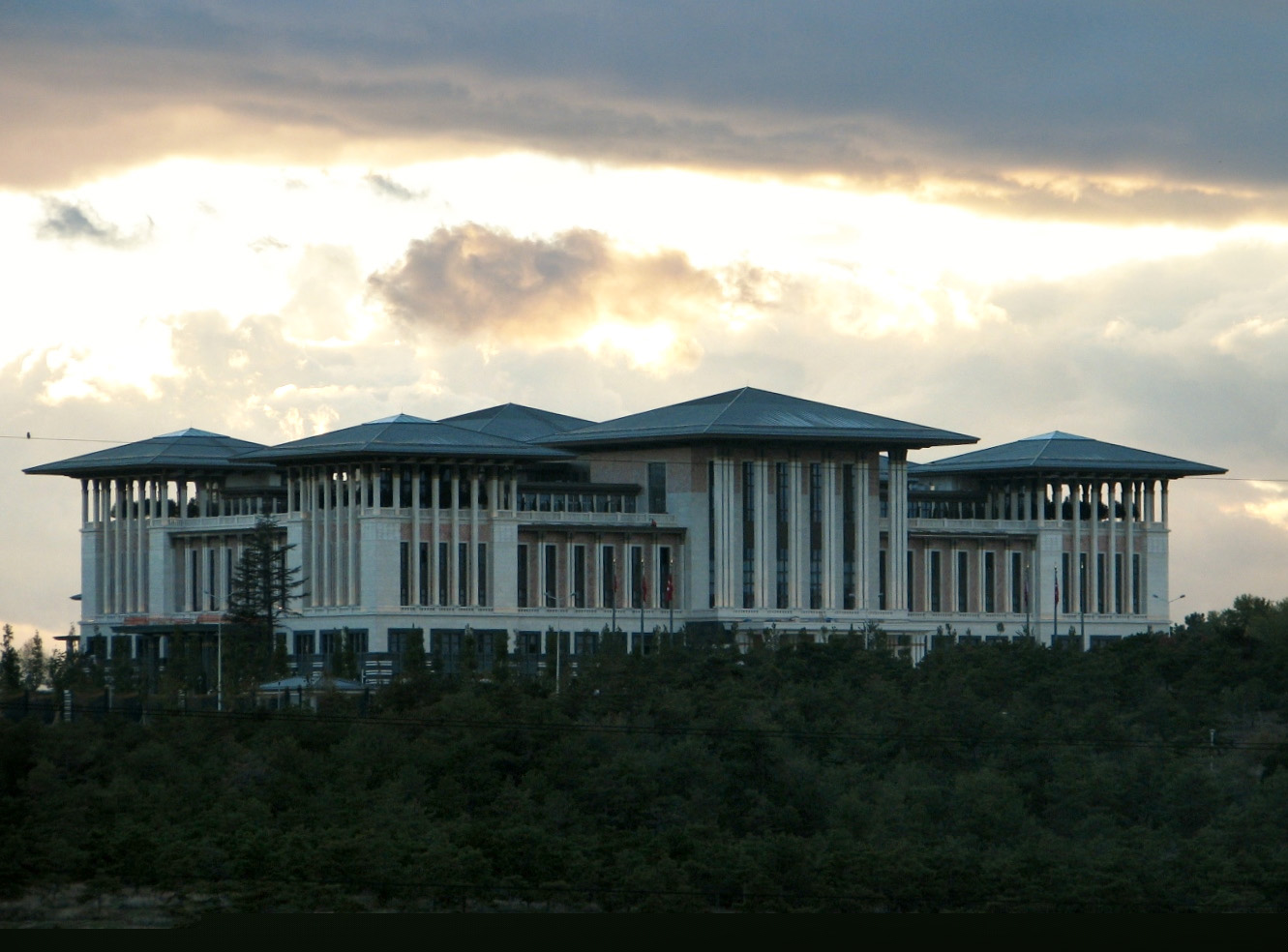
The Presidential Complex

- Head of state and Head of government: President of Turkey, Recep Tayyip Erdoğan (12th)
- Vice President of Turkey: Fuat Oktay (1st)
- Cabinet of Turkey

==== Judicial branch ====
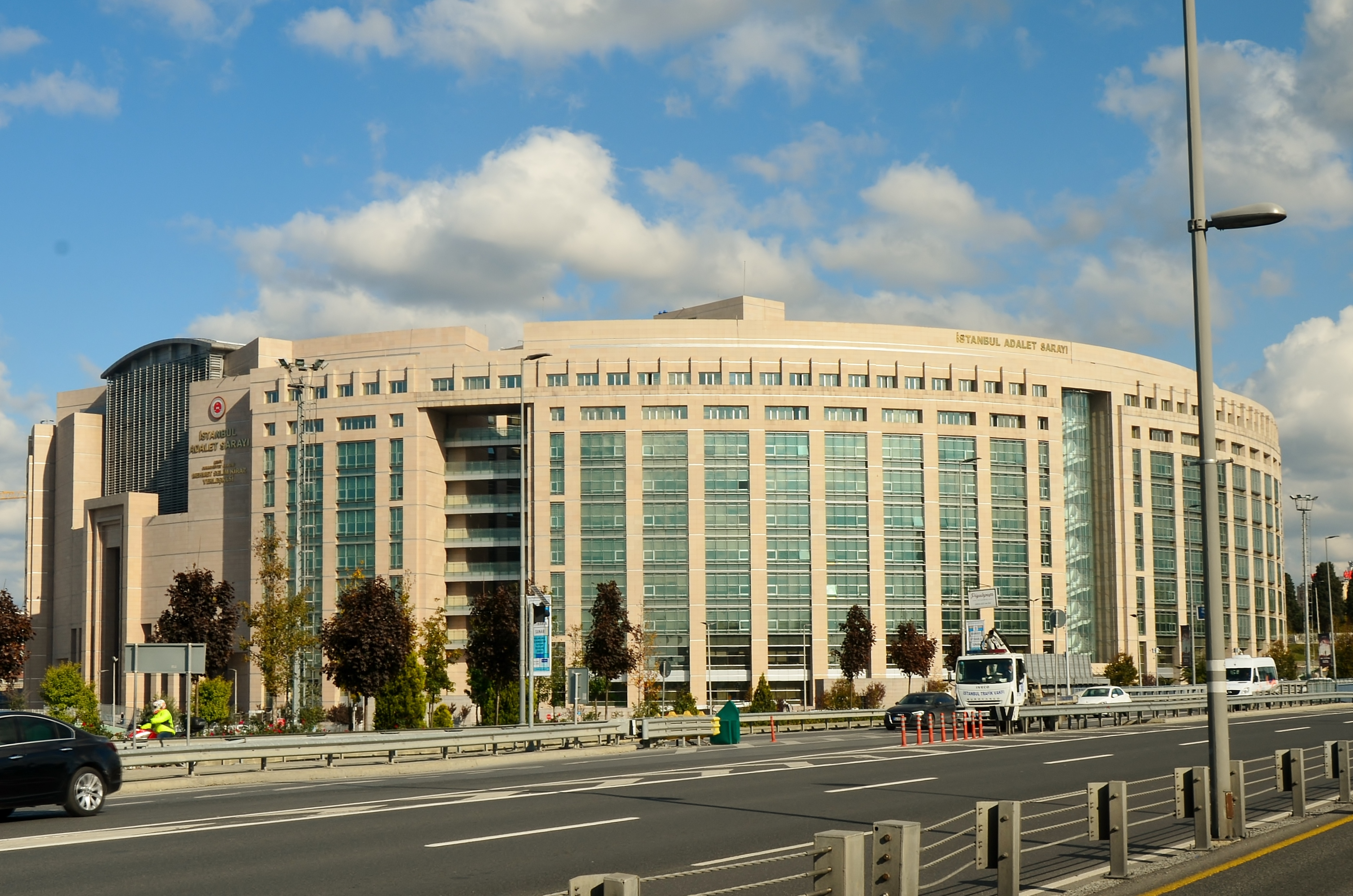
A courthouse in Istanbul

- Turkey national courts
  - Constitutional Court of Turkey
    - Chief Justice of Turkey
  - High Court of Appeals of Turkey
  - Supreme Council of Public Accounts
  - Court of Jurisdictional Disputes

=== Foreign relations ===
- Diplomatic missions in Turkey
- Diplomatic missions of Turkey
- Foreign policy of Turkey

==== International organization membership ====
- Member state of the Group of Twenty (G20)
- Member state of Council of Europe
- Member state of the North Atlantic Treaty Organization
- Member state of the Organization of Islamic Cooperation
- Member state of the Organization for Economic Co-operation and Development
- Member state of the United Nations
- Member state of the Turkic Council

=== Military ===
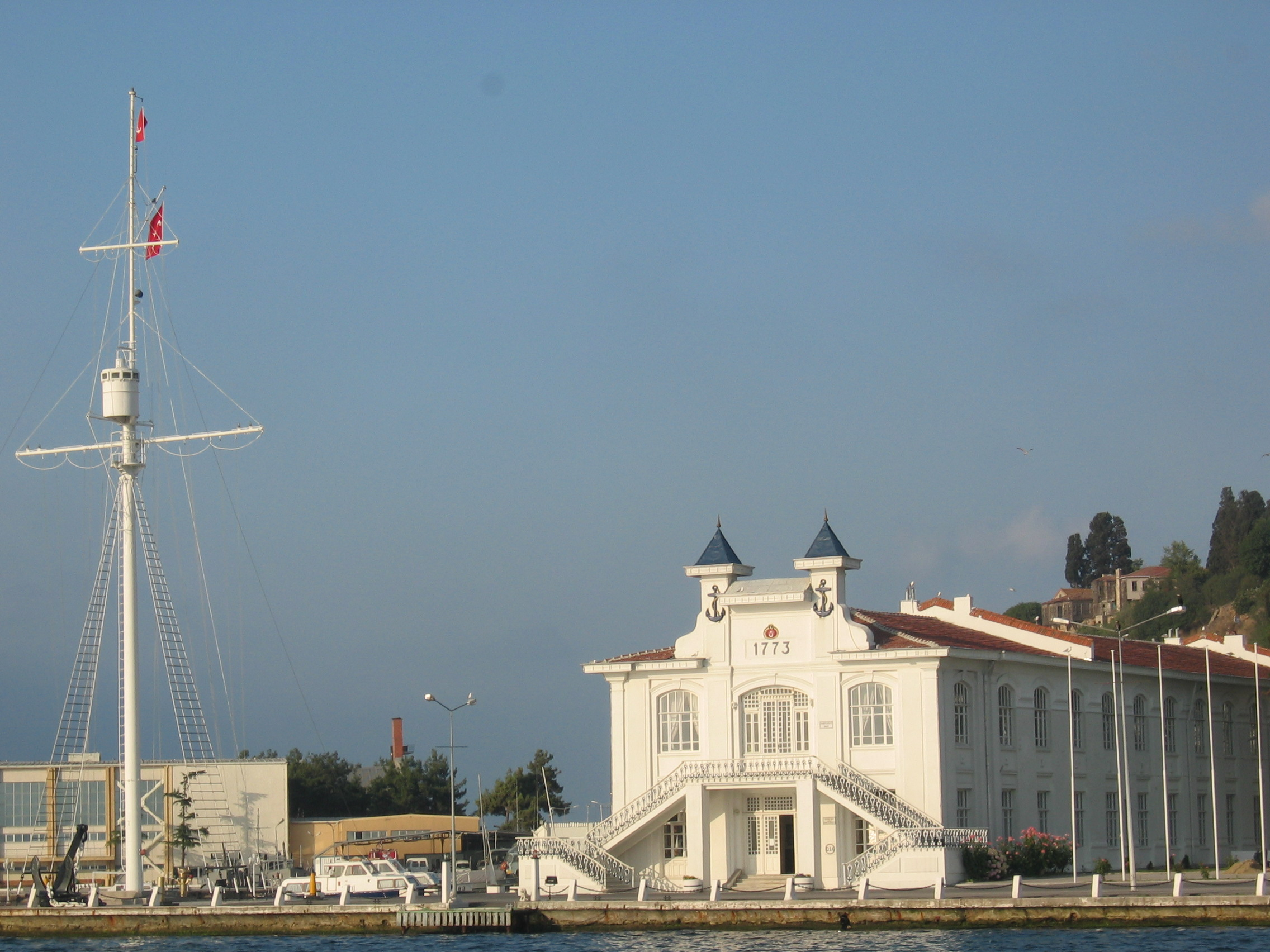
Turkish navy

- Turkish Army
  - Turkish Gendarmerie
- Turkish Air Force
- Turkish Coast Guard

=== Intelligence organizations ===
- National Intelligence Organization (MİT)
- KDGM
- General Staff of the Turkish Armed Forces
- Gendarmerie Intelligence Organization

== History of Turkey ==
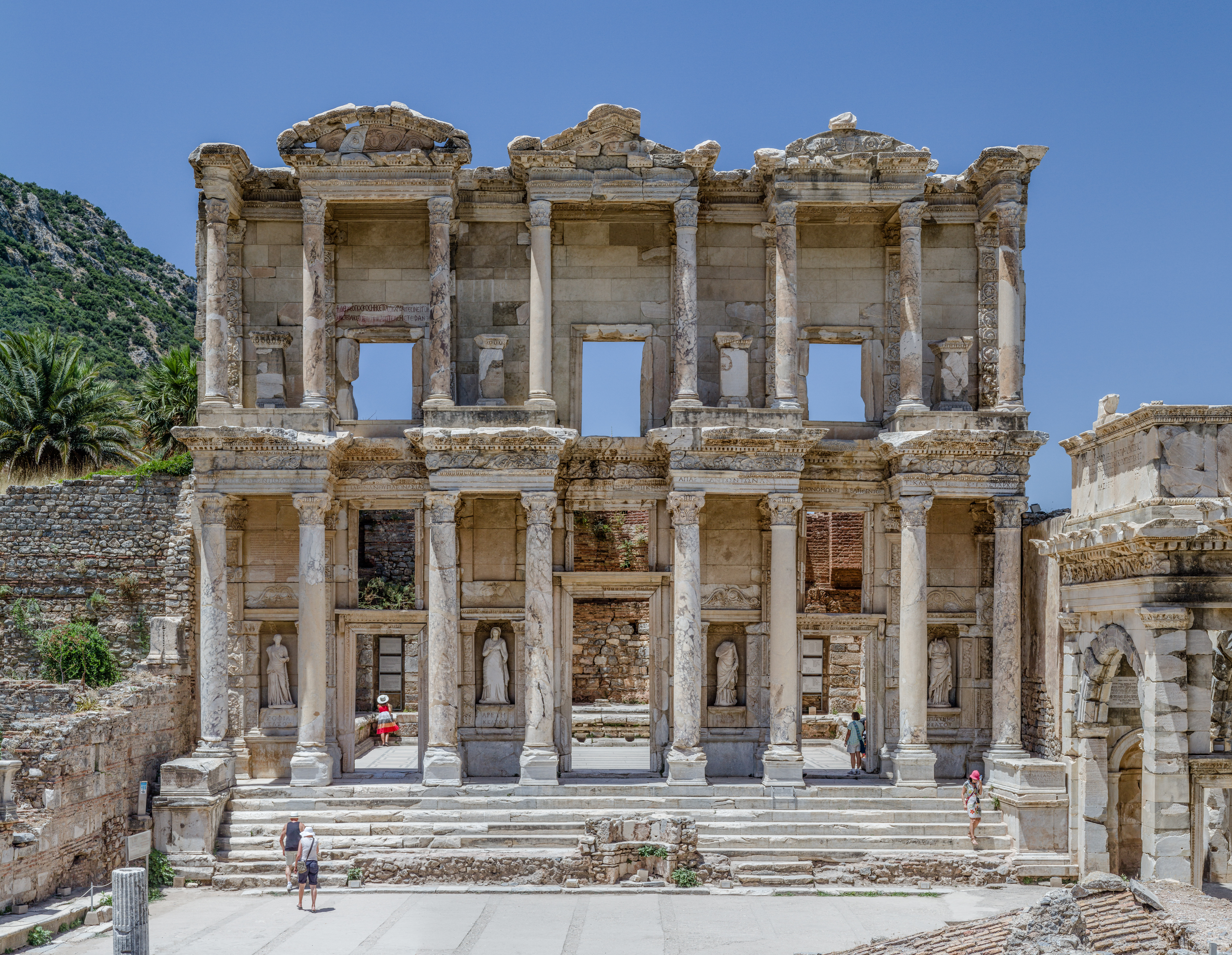
Ephesus

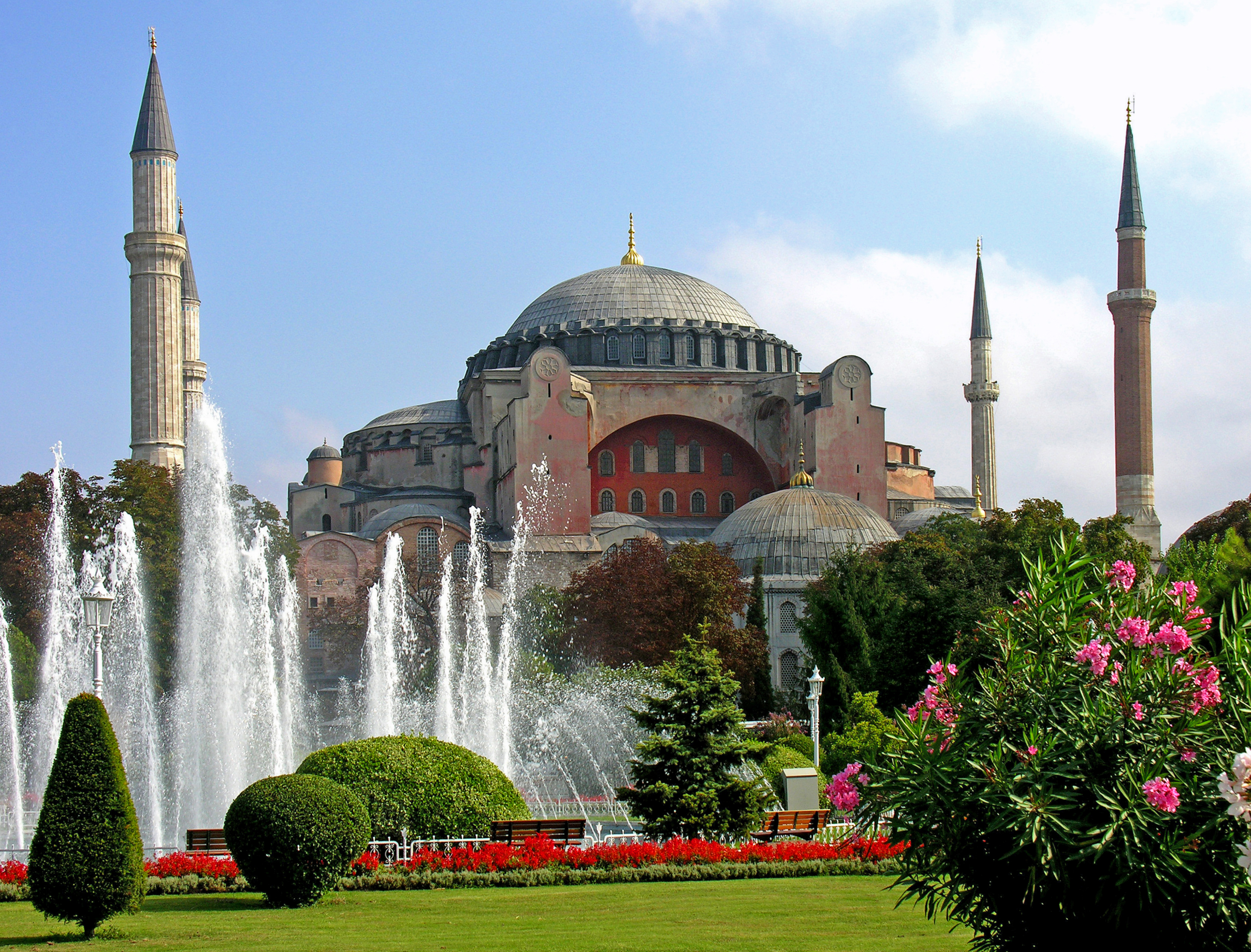
Hagia Sophia

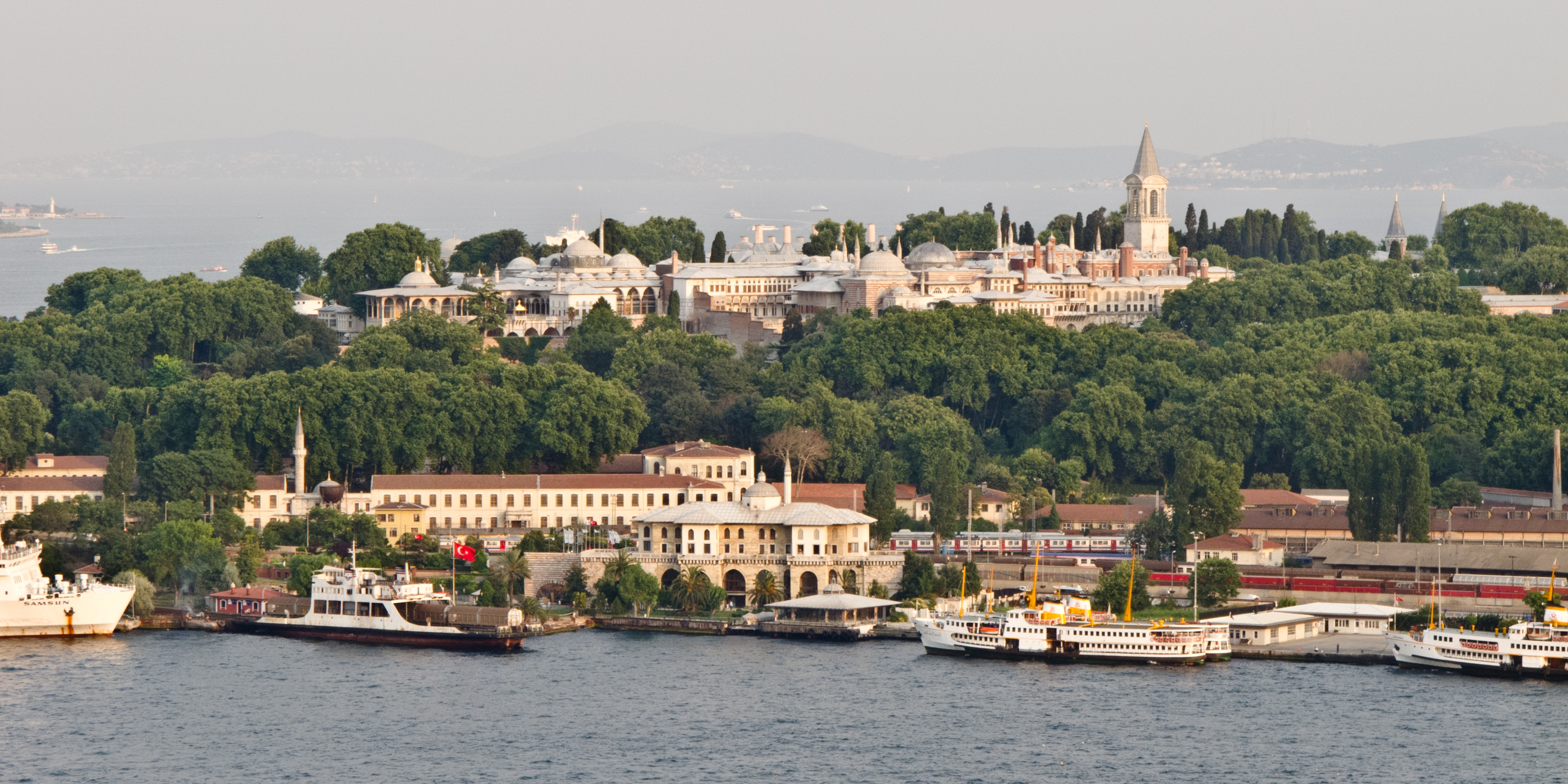
Topkapı is one of the many Ottoman palaces in Istanbul.

=== History of Turkey, by period ===
- Ancient period
- Ancient settlements in Turkey
- Ancient kingdoms of Anatolia
- Ottoman Empire
- Rebellions in the Ottoman Empire

=== History of Turkey, by subject ===
- Constitutional history of Turkey
- Economic history of Turkey
- Genetic history of the Turkish people
- History of the Jews in Turkey
- Military history of Turkey
- History of Turkish navies

== Culture of Turkey ==
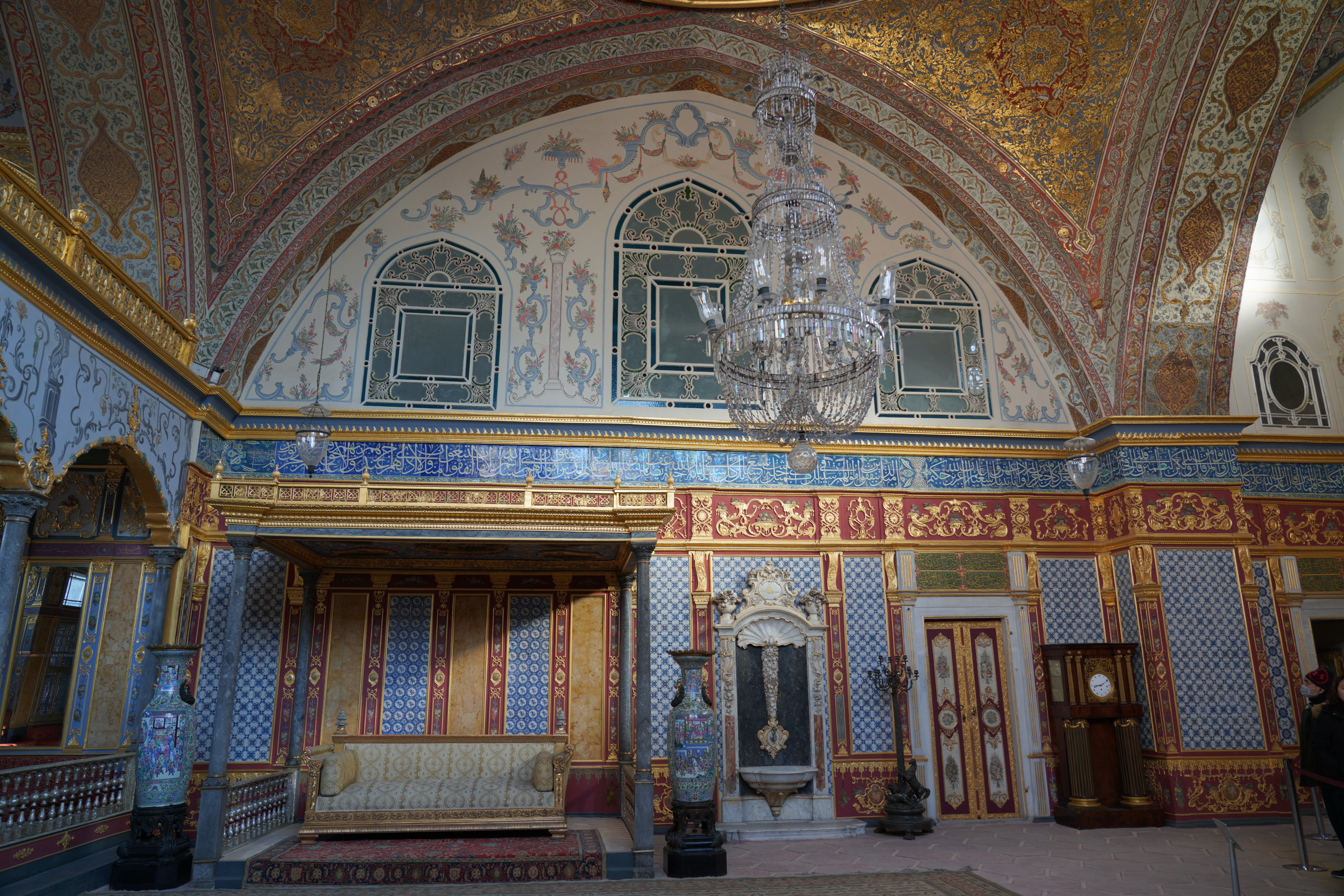
Topkapı served as the main residence of Ottoman sultans in the 15th and 16th centuries.

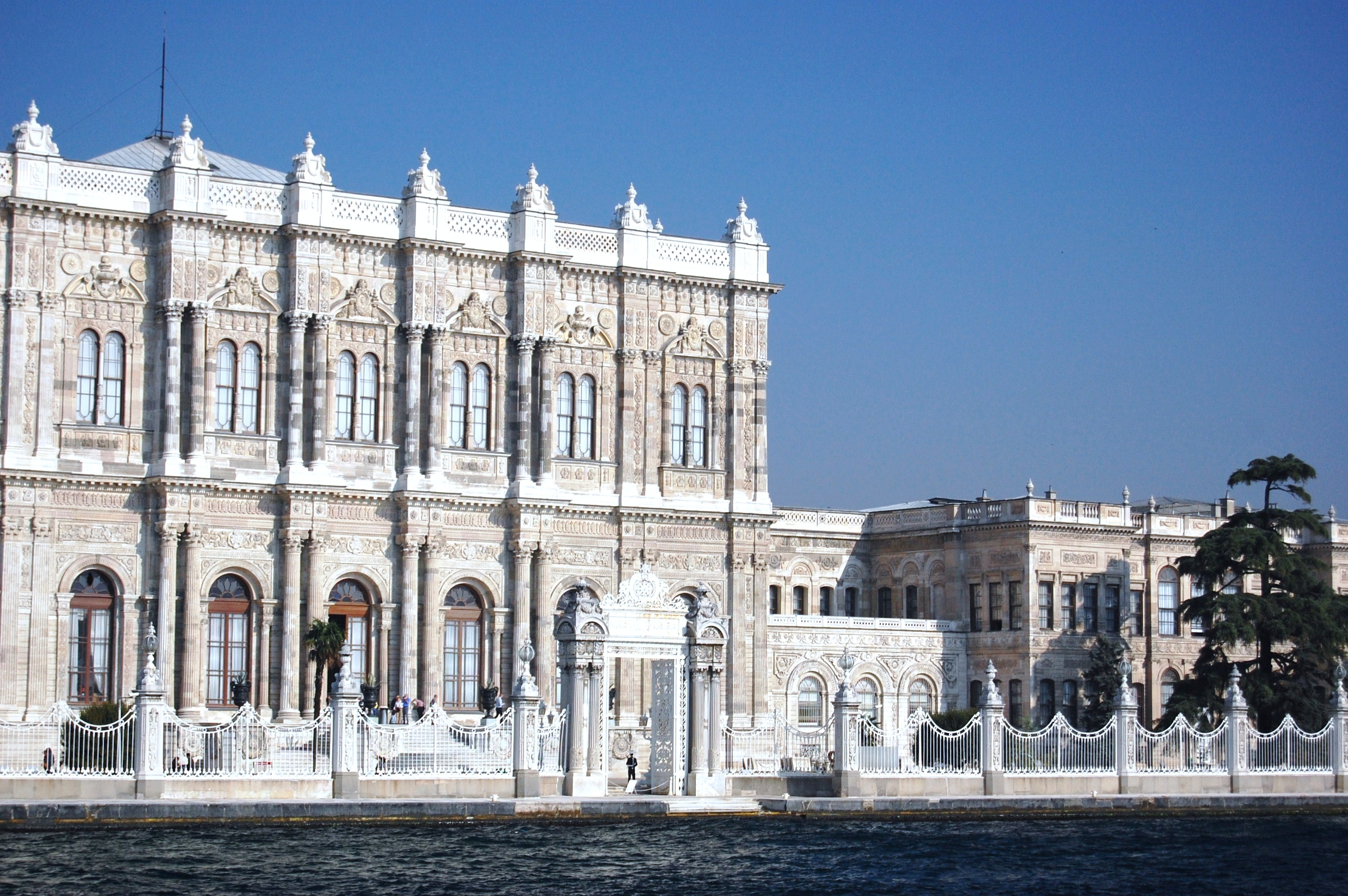
Dolmabahçe Palace is on the Bosporus with sweeping views.

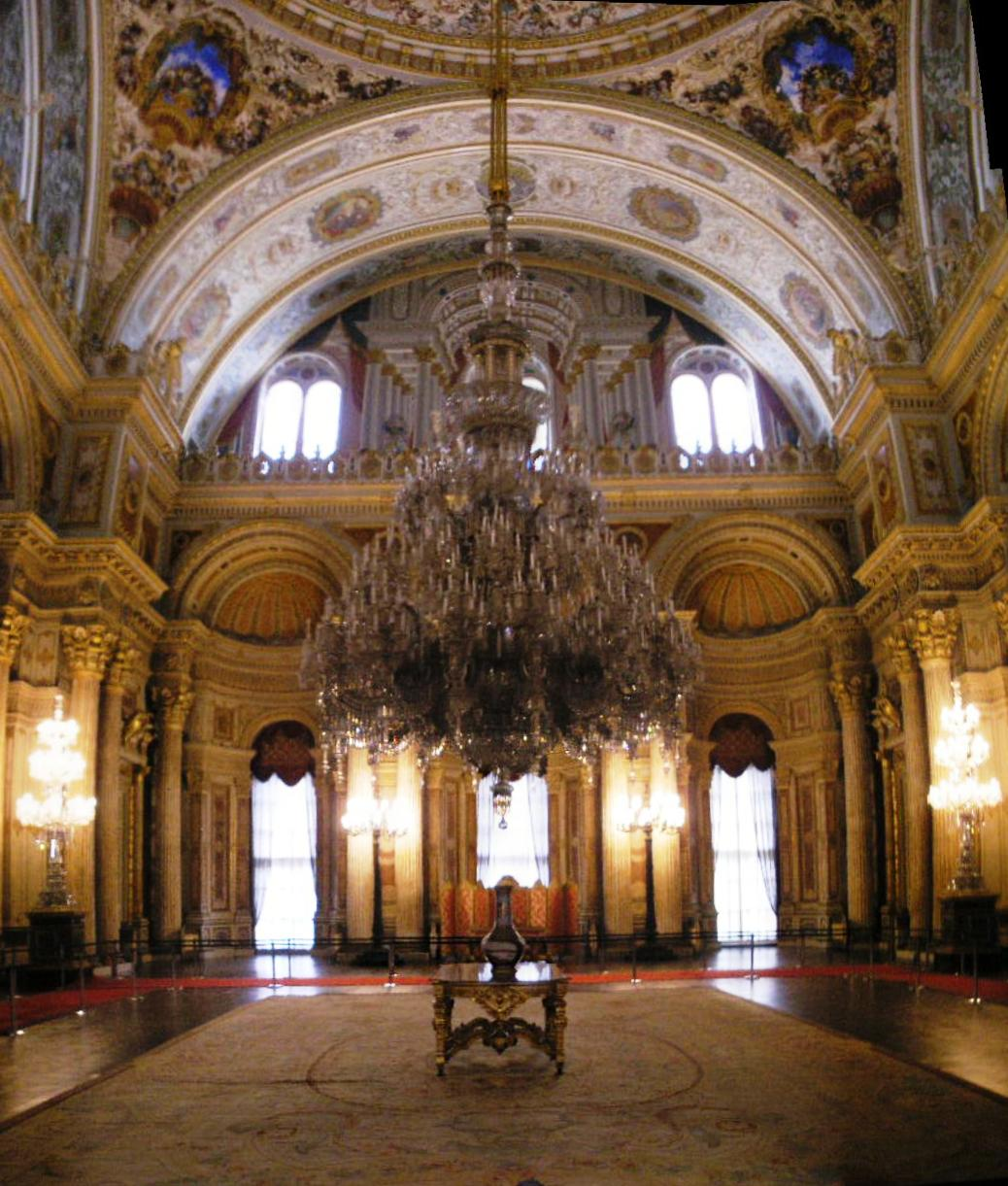
Dolmabahçe Palace displays Baroque influences in Ottoman architecture.

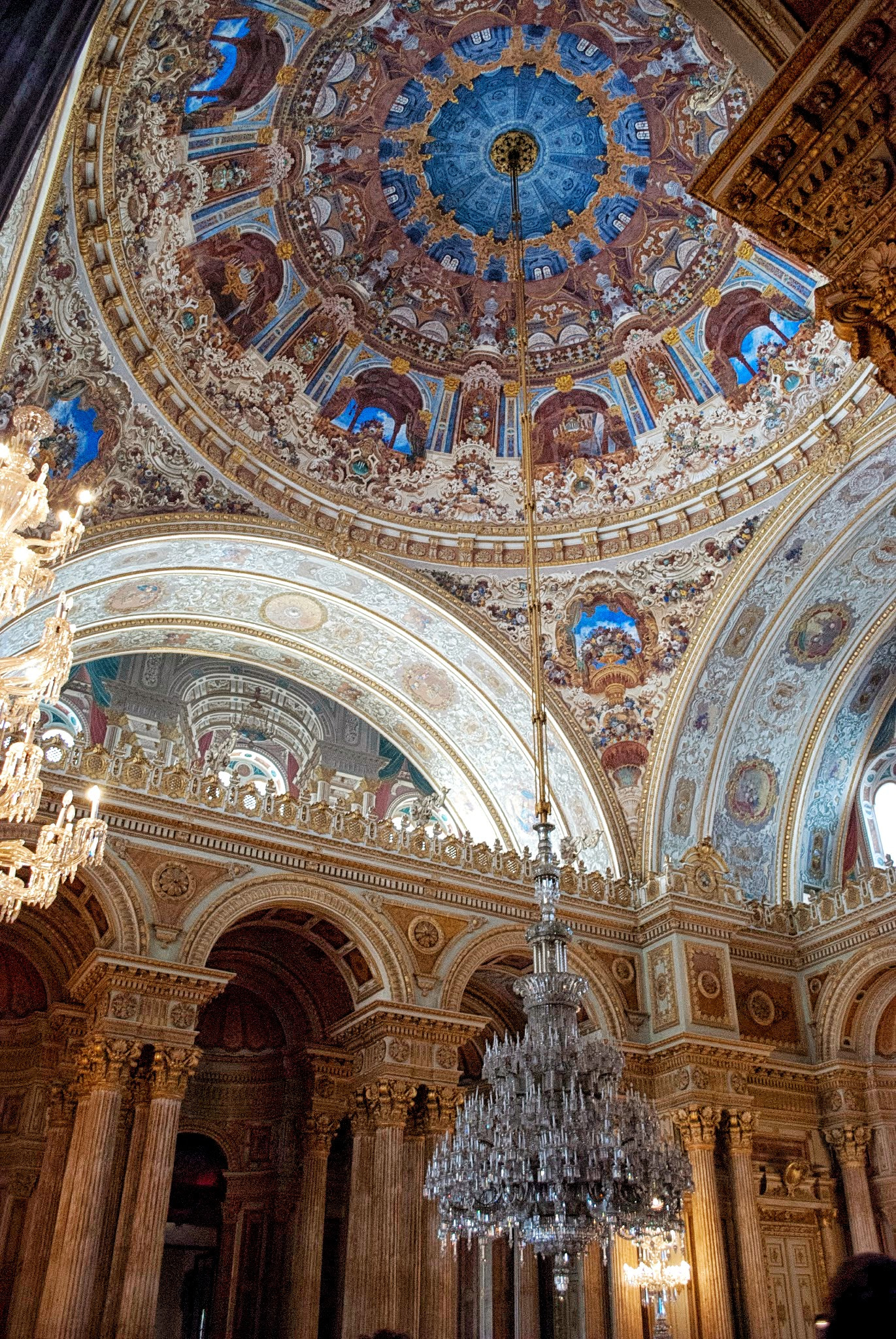
The chandelier in Dolmabahçe Palace was a gift from Queen Victoria.

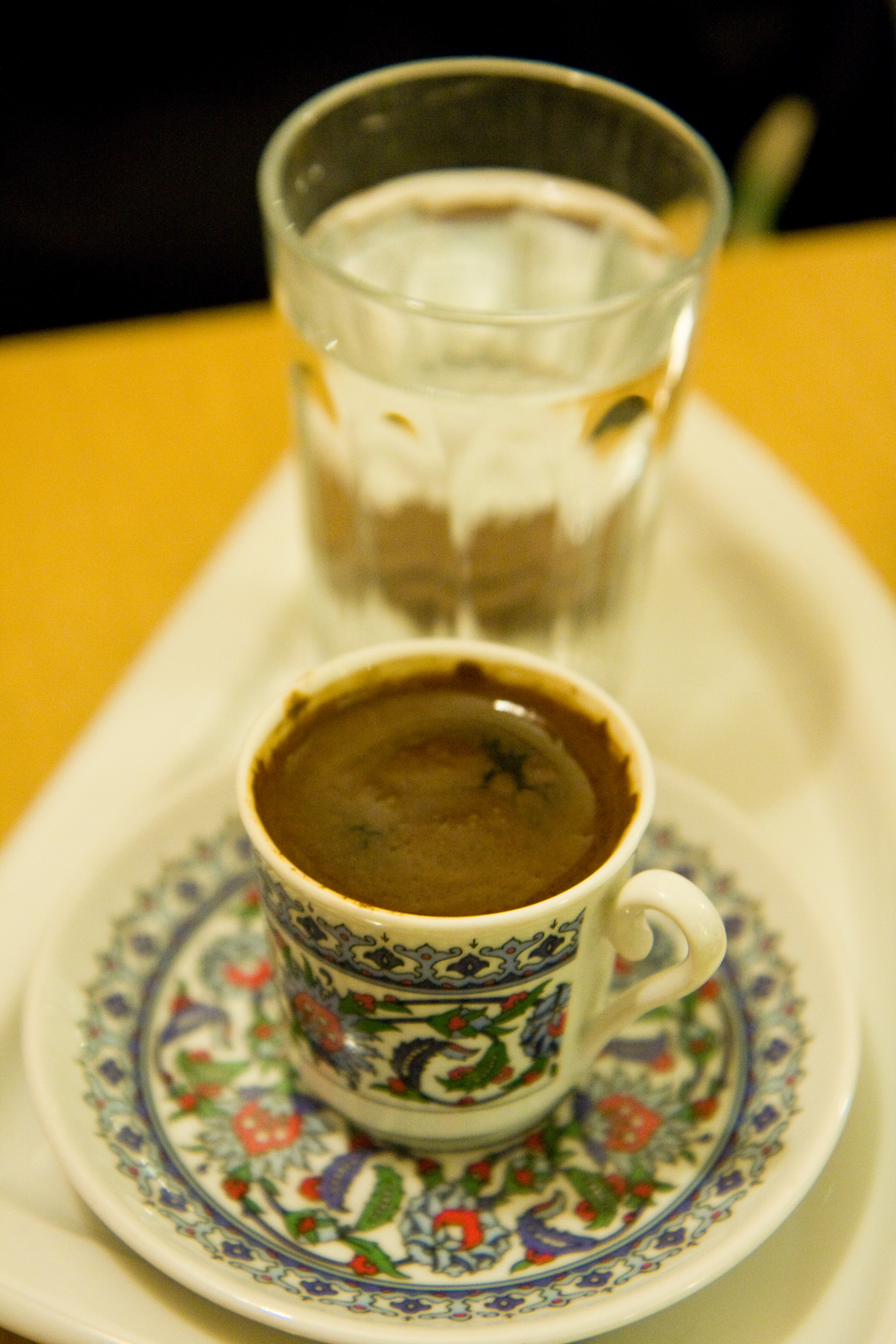
Appreciation for Turkish coffee in Istanbul led to the creation of the first ever coffeehouse in the world.

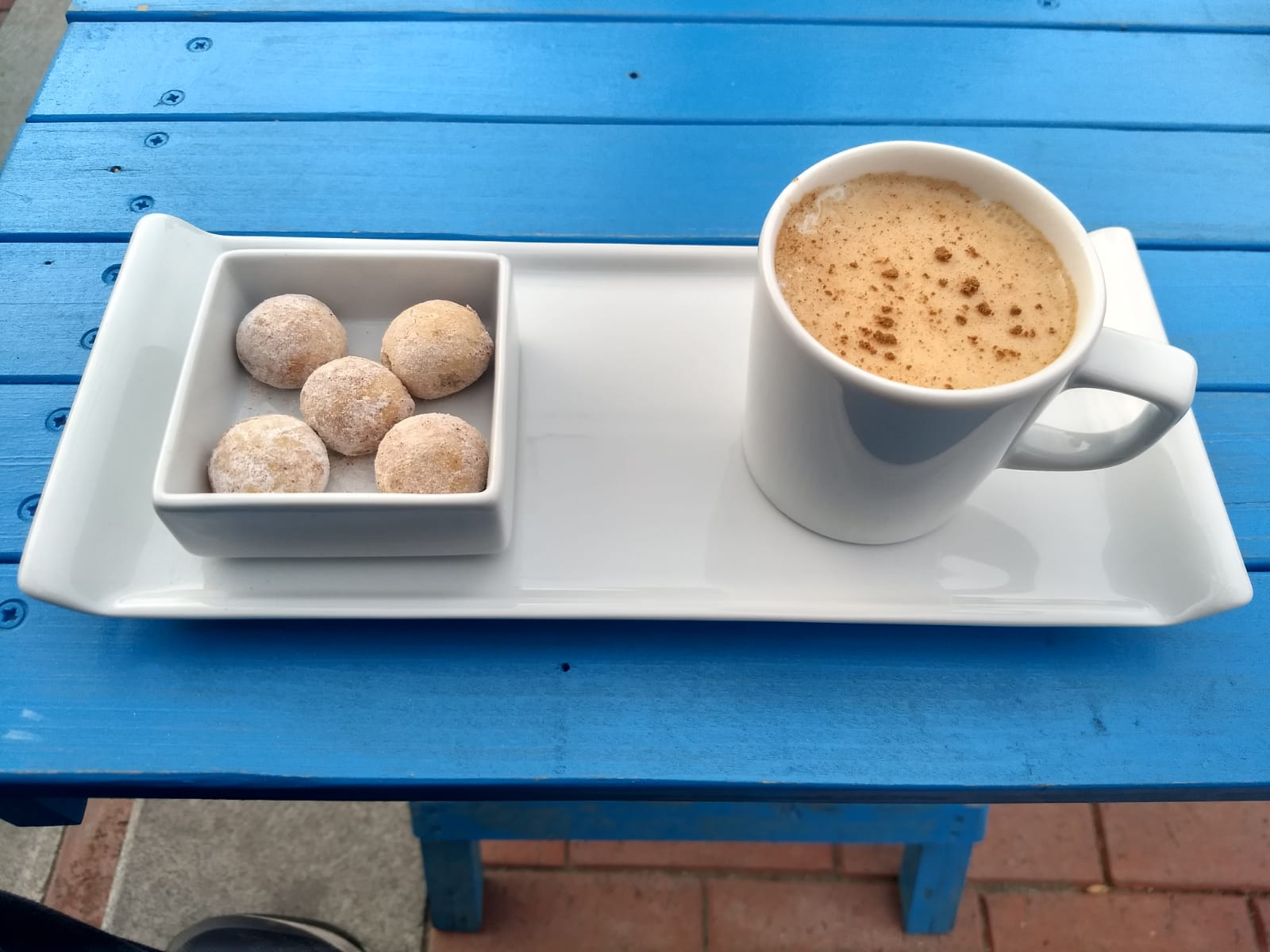
Salep is a traditional drink that is made out of orchids.

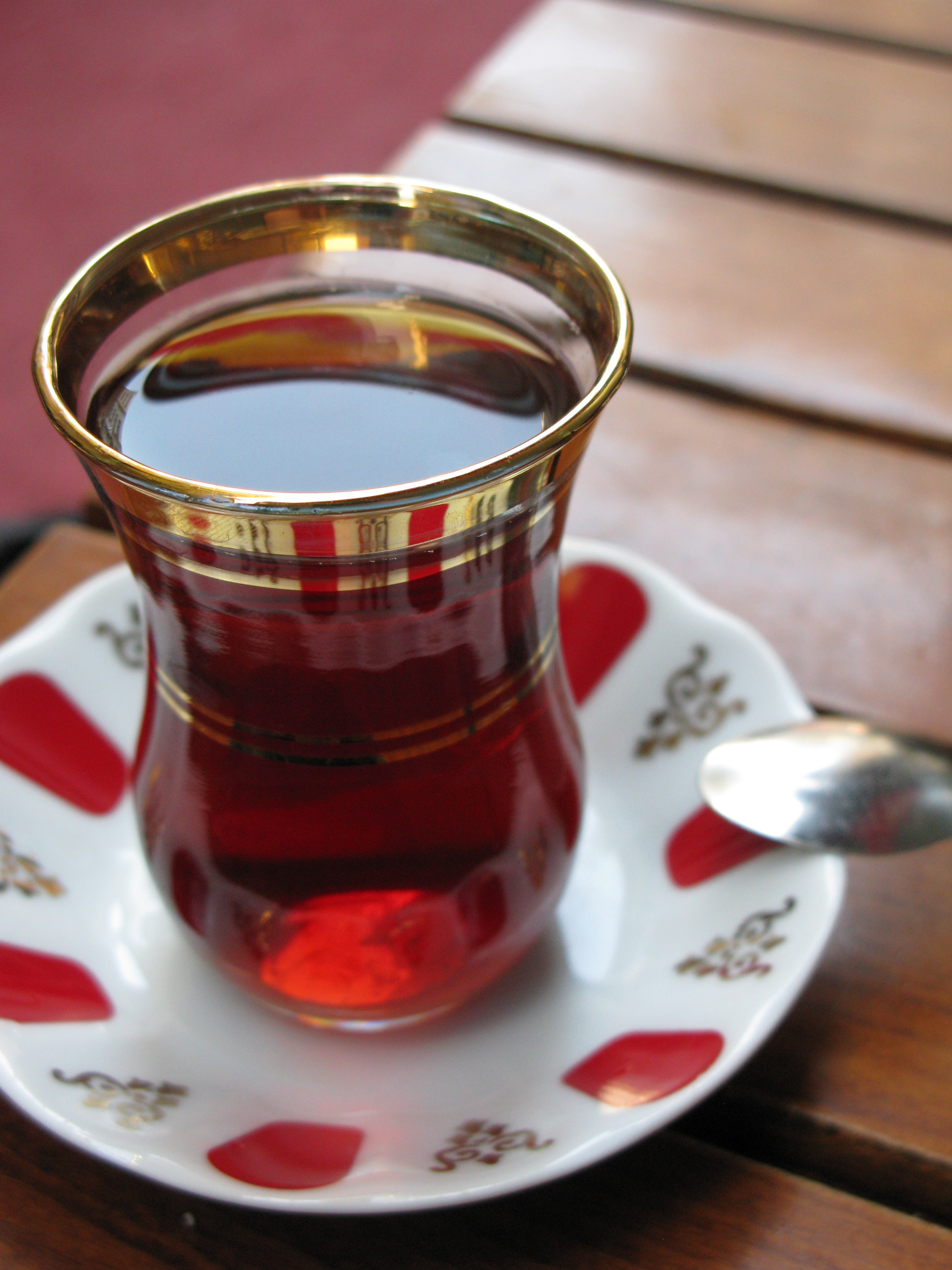
Turkey consumes more tea per capita than any other country.

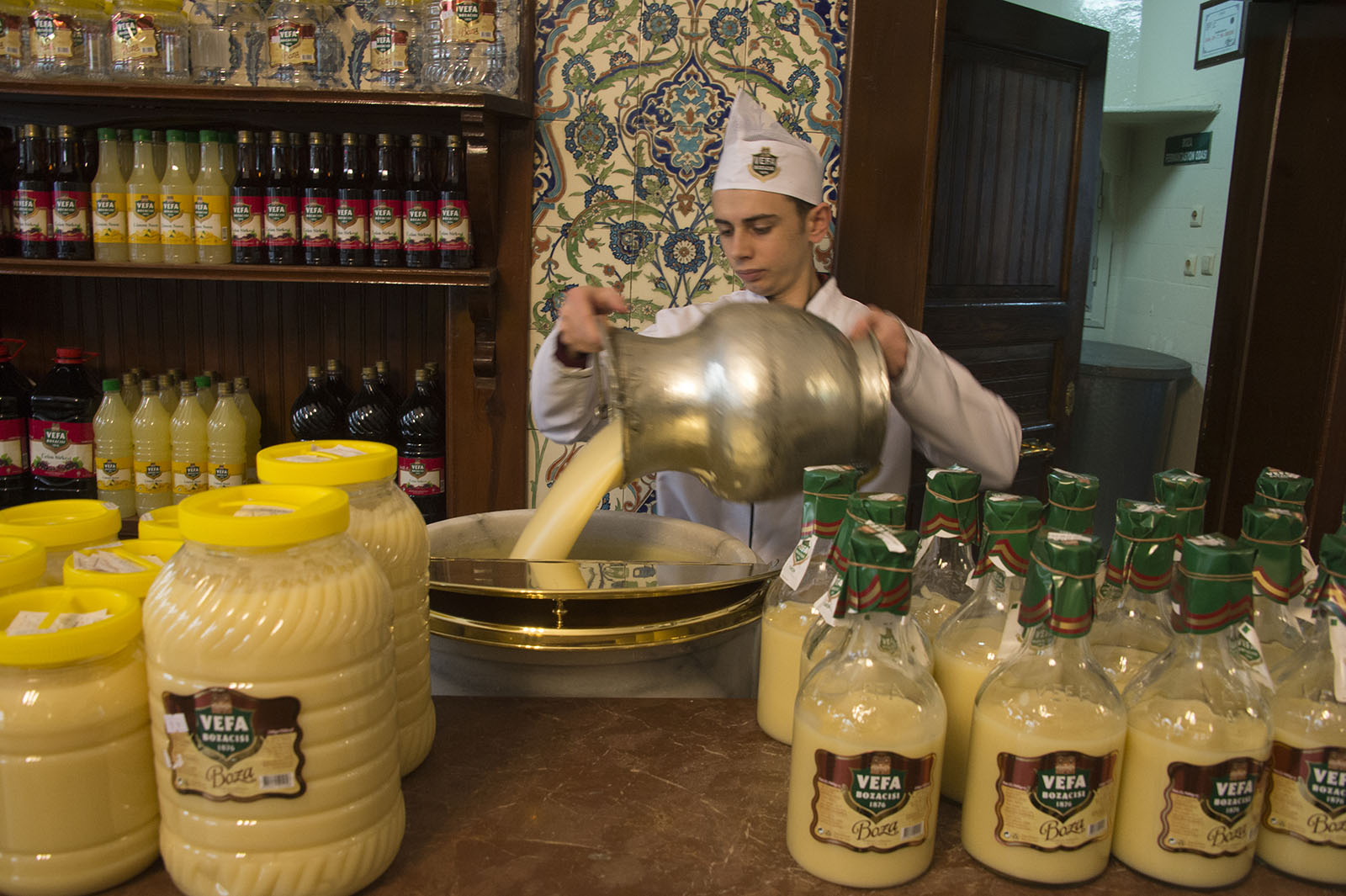
Boza is a popular wintertime malt drink.

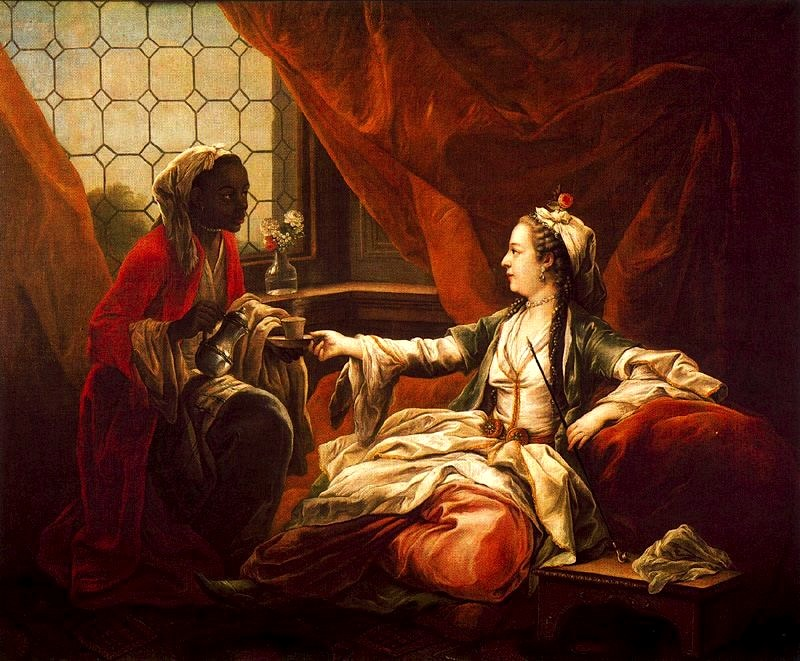
Turquerie: Madame de Pompadour portrayed as a Turkish lady in 1747.

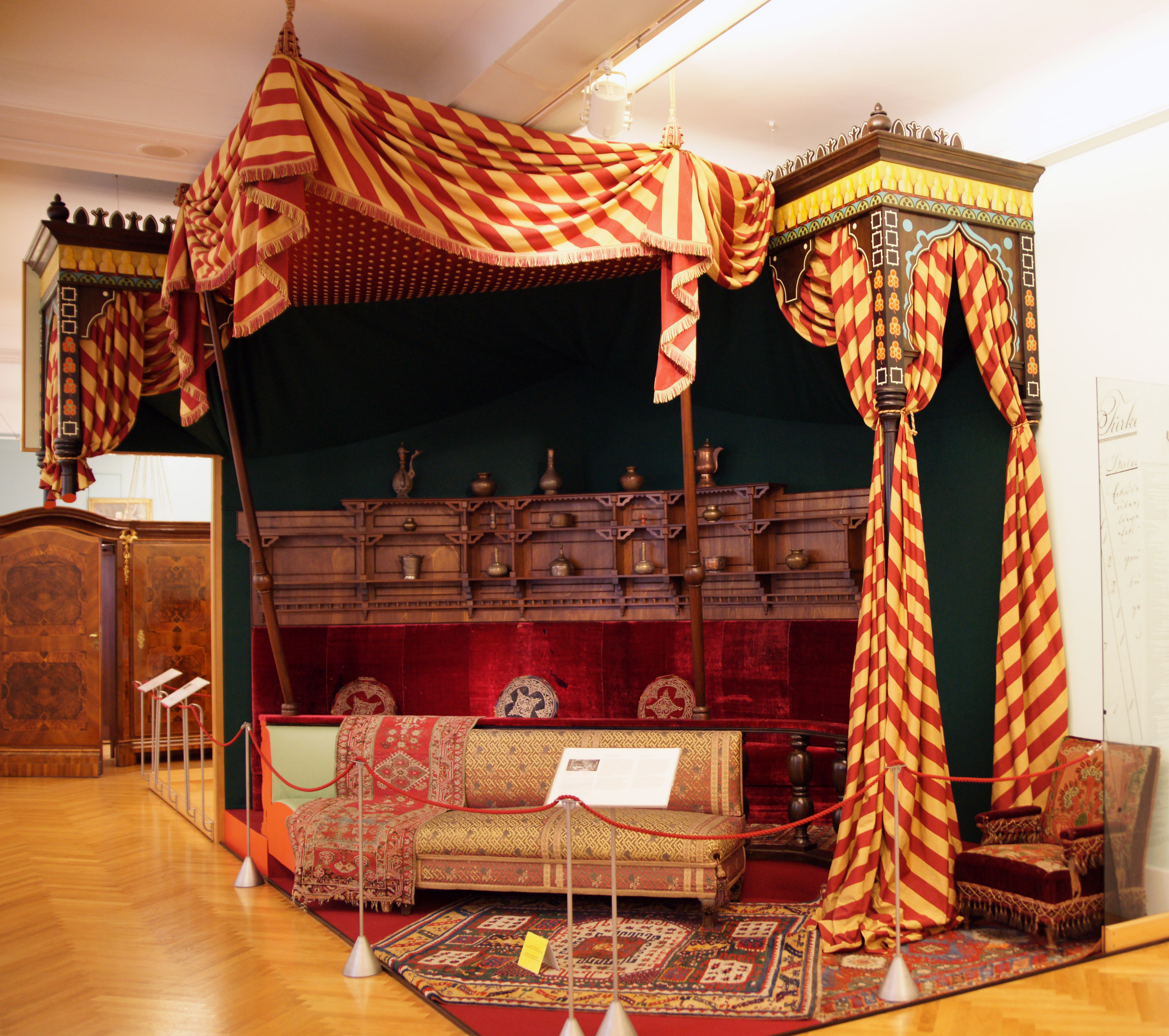
Turquerie: Crown prince of Austria had his working room decorated in the Turkish style in 1881.

- Architecture
- Anatolian Beylik Architecture
  - Ottoman architecture
    - Early Ottoman architecture
    - Classical Ottoman architecture
    - Tulip Period architecture
    - Ottoman Baroque architecture
    - Late Ottoman architecture
  - Seljuk architecture
  - Turkish Neoclassical architecture
  - List of Turkish architects
  - List of castles in Turkey
  - List of cathedrals in Turkey
  - List of clock towers in Turkey
  - List of hans and kervansarays in Turkey
  - List of libraries in Turkey
  - List of palaces in Turkey
- Cuisine
  - Ottoman cuisine
  - Beer in Turkey
  - Tea in Turkey
  - Turkish desserts
  - Turkish wine
- Languages
  - Adyghe (Circassian)
  - Northern Kurdish
  - Ladino
  - Turkish
    - Regional Turkish
  - Turkish Sign Language
  - Western Armenian
- Media
  - Newspapers
  - Radio stations
  - Television
- Museums
- Public holidays
- Traditions
  - Carpets
  - Folk dances
  - Shadow play
- Turkophilia
  - Turquerie
- World Heritage Sites in Turkey

=== Art in Turkey ===
- Cinema
  - Golden Orange Awards
  - Turkish actors
  - Turkish directors
  - Turkish films
  - Turkish production companies
  - Turkish scriptwriters
- Literature
  - Turkish novelists
  - List of contemporary Turkish poets
  - Turkish short story writers
- Museums
- Music
  - Classical composers
  - Composers
- Theater
  - Turkish playwrights
- Television
  - Television series
- Visual arts
  - Turkish painters
  - Turkish photographers
  - Turkish sculpturist

== Law in Turkey ==
- Constitution of Turkey
  - Separation of church and state in Turkey
  - Separation of powers under the Turkish Constitution
  - Civil liberties in Turkey
    - Abortion in Turkey
    - Assisted suicide in Turkey
    - Freedom of assembly in Turkey
    - Freedom of association in Turkey
    - Freedom of information in Turkey
    - Freedom of movement under Turkish law
    - Freedom of the press in Turkey
    - Freedom of religion in Turkey
    - Freedom of speech in Turkey
    - LGBT rights in Turkey
    - Polygamy in Turkey
    - Prostitution in Turkey
- Criminal law in Turkey
  - Criminal law procedure in Turkey
  - Capital punishment in Turkey
  - Crime in Turkey
  - Human trafficking in Turkey
  - Terrorism in Turkey
  - Crimes against the public
    - Sumptuary law in Turkey
      - Alcohol laws of Turkey
      - Smoking ban in Turkey
  - Crimes against property
    - Bribery in Turkey
    - Embezzlement in Turkey
    - Gambling in Turkey
    - Intellectual property violation
    - Tax evasion in Turkey
  - Crimes against animals in Turkey
    - Animal cruelty laws in Turkey
- Family law in Turkey
  - Marriage in Turkey
    - Marriageable age
  - Dissolution of marriage in Turkey
    - No-fault divorce in Turkey
    - Child custody laws in Turkey
    - Child support in Turkey
    - Parenting coordinator in Turkey
    - Grandparent visitation rights in Turkey
  - Adoption in Turkey
  - Surrogacy in Turkey
  - Child protective services in Turkey
  - Emancipation of minors in Turkey
  - Juvenile law in Turkey
- Intellectual property law in Turkey
  - World Intellectual Property Organization
  - Copyright law in Turkey
    - Public domain in Turkey
- Commercial law in Turkey
  - Bankruptcy in Turkey
  - Consumer protection in Turkey
  - Securities regulation in Turkey
    - Capital Markets Board of Turkey
    - Financial Regulation in Turkey
- Jurisprudence in Turkey
  - Judicial review in Turkey
  - Practice of law in Turkey
- Law making in Turkey
  - Ballot measures in Turkey
  - Executive orders in Turkey
  - Legislative rulemaking in Turkey
  - Treaties of Turkey
  - Statutory law
    - Acts of Parliament in Turkey
- Law enforcement in Turkey

=== Religion in Turkey ===
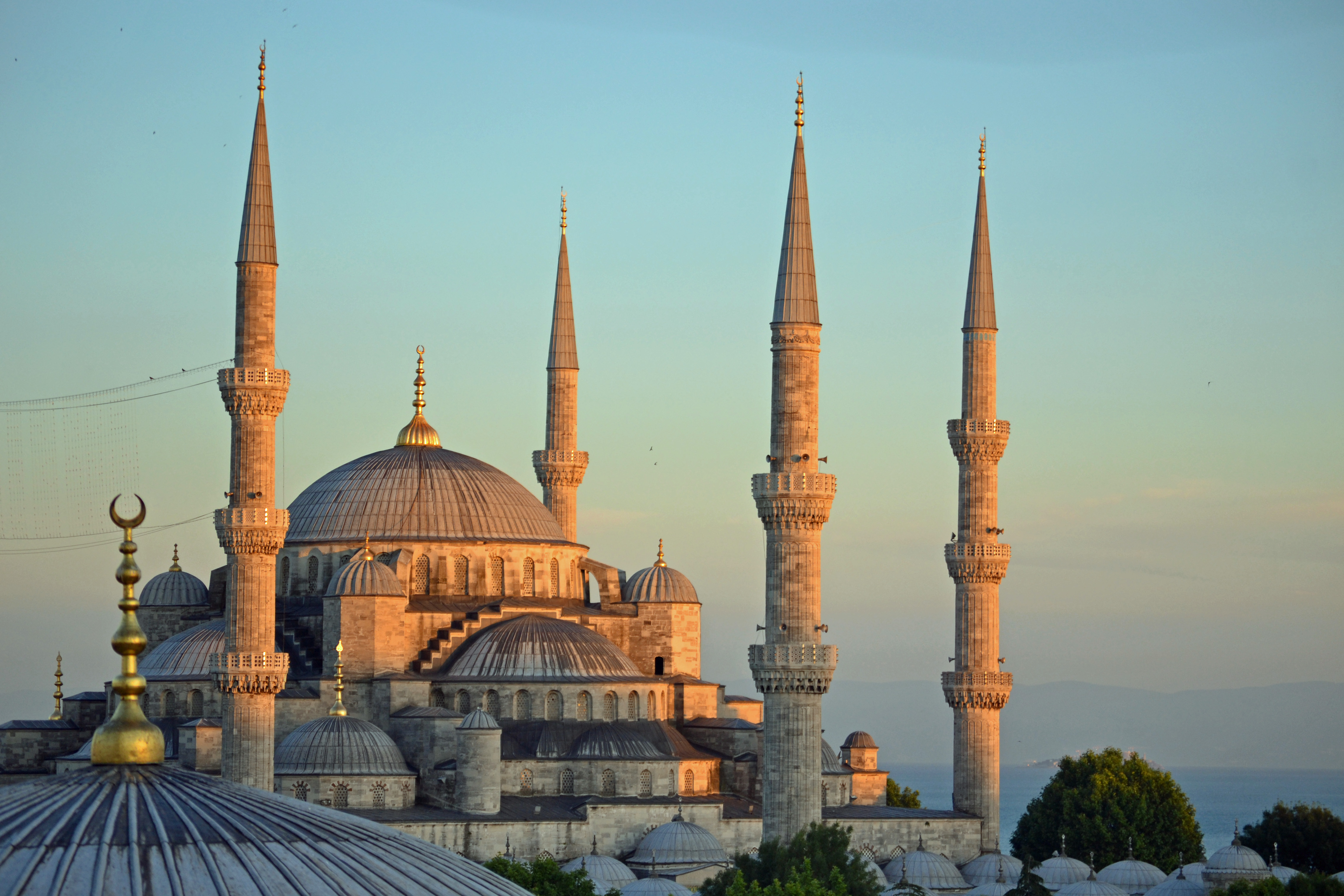
Blue Mosque in Istanbul

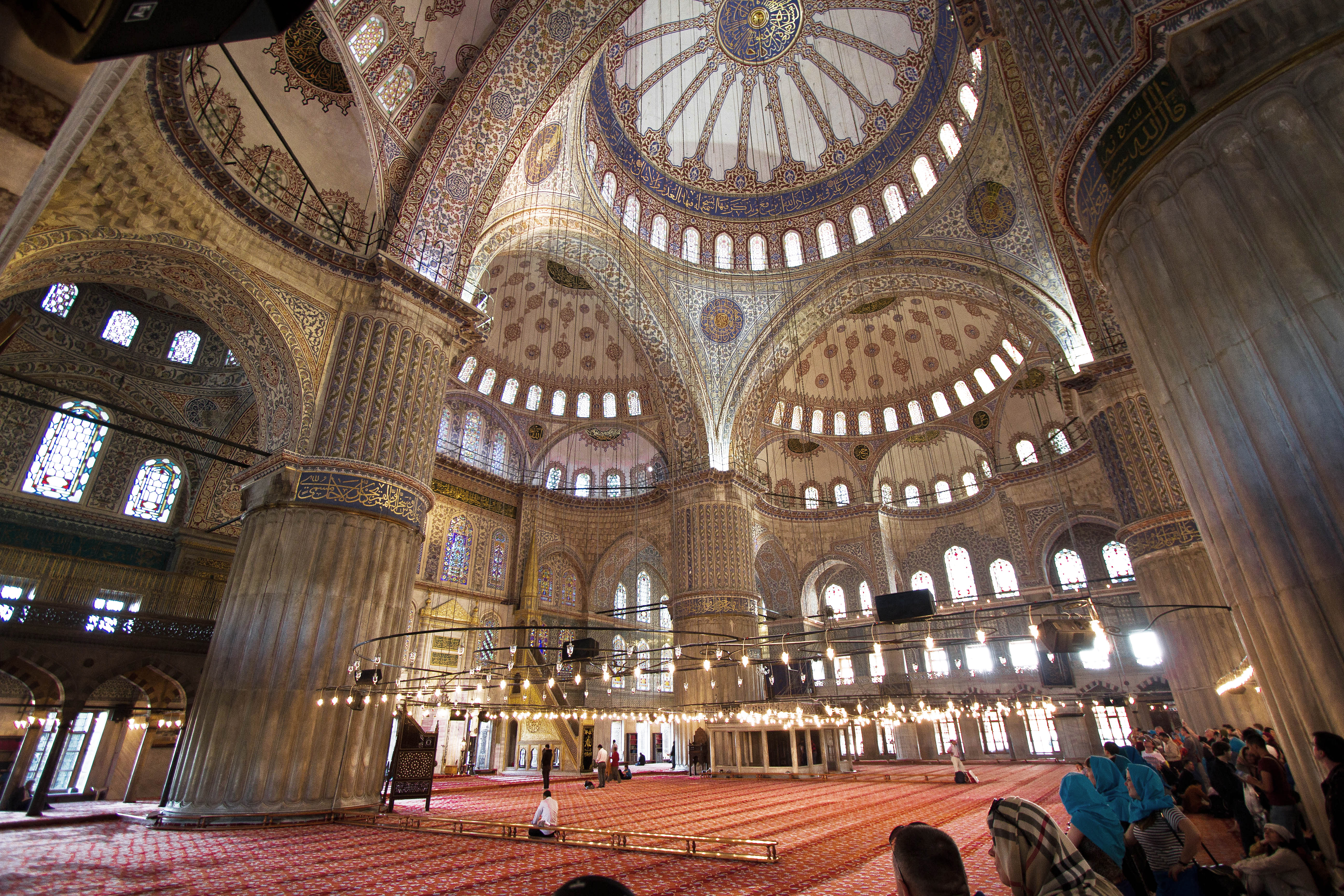
Inside the Blue Mosque

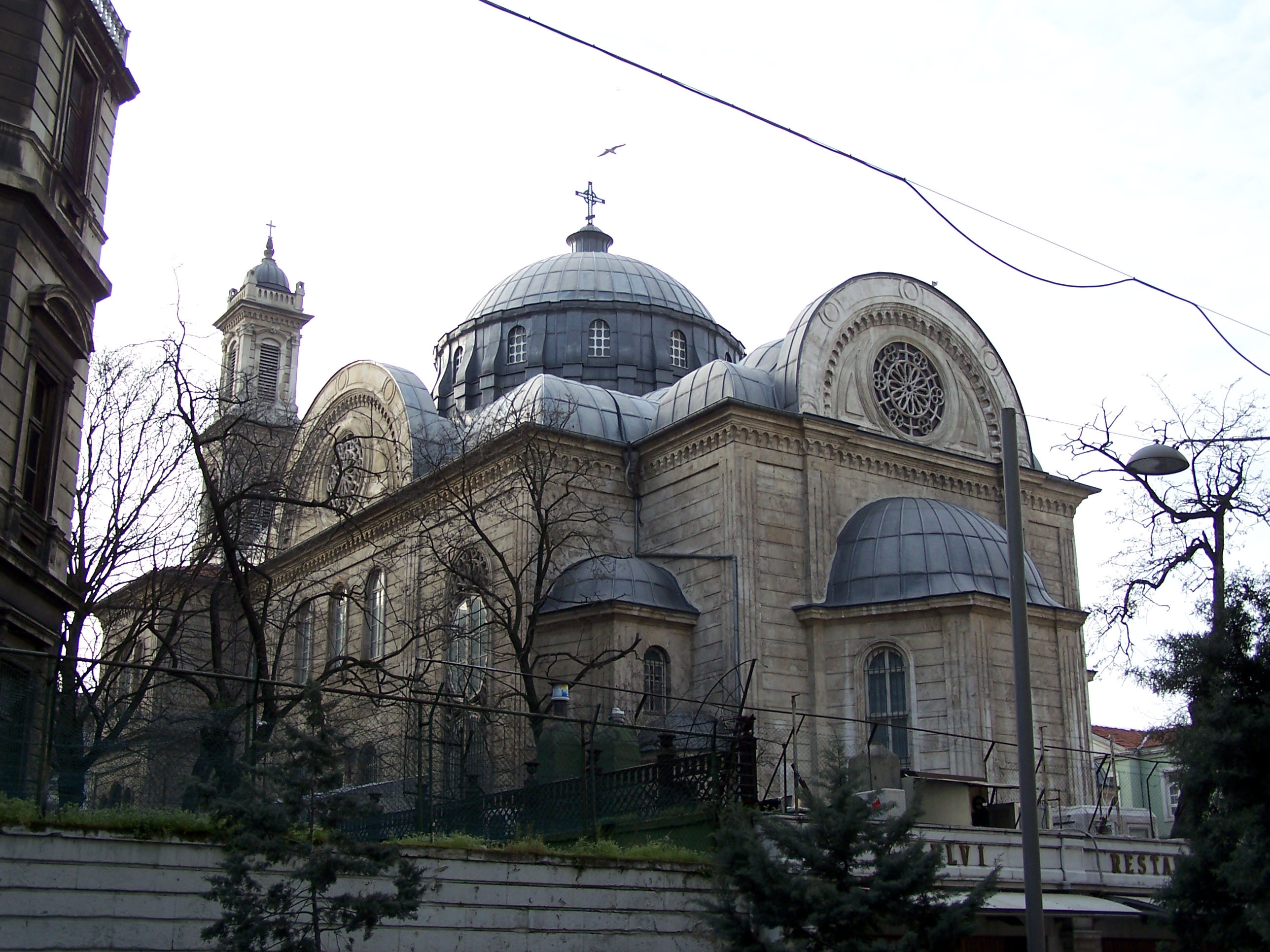
Hagia Triada in Istanbul

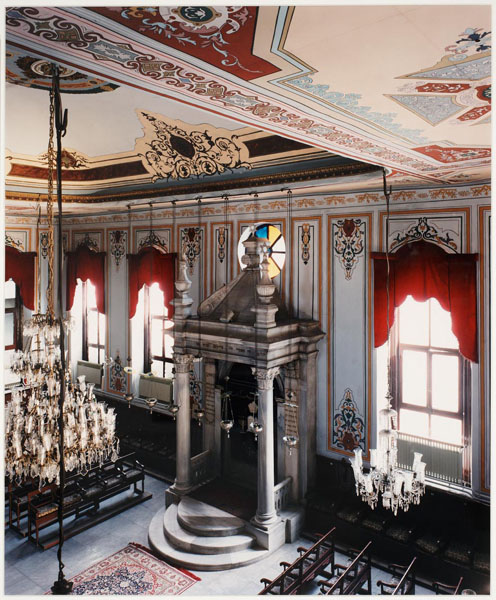
Hemdat Israel Synagogue

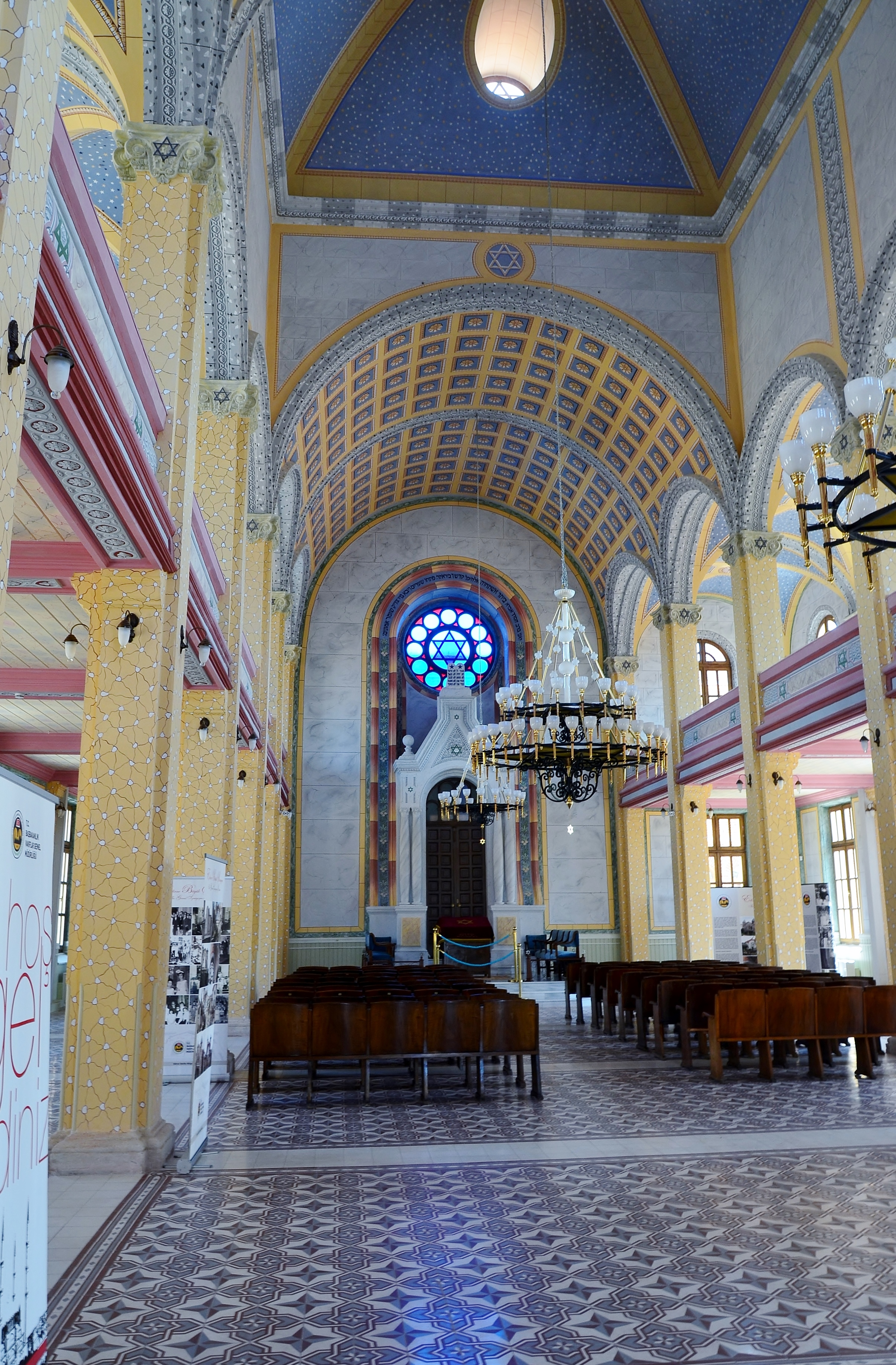
Grand Synagogue of Edirne

- Bahá'í Faith in Turkey
- Buddhism
- Christianity in Turkey
  - Catholic Church in Turkey
    - Latin Church
      - Archdiocese of İzmir
      - Apostolic Vicariate of Anatolia
      - Apostolic Vicariate of Istanbul
    - Armenian Catholic Church
      - Archeparchy of Istanbul
    - Greek Byzantine Catholic Church
      - Greek Catholic Exarchate of Istanbul
    - Syriac Catholic Church
      - Syriac Catholic Exarchate of Istanbul
    - Chaldean Catholic Church
      - Chaldean Catholic Archeparchy of Istanbul
  - Greek Orthodox Church
    - Ecumenical Patriarchate of Constantinople
    - Greek Orthodox Church of Antioch
    - Turkish Orthodox Patriarchate
  - Nestorian Church of the East
    - Assyrian Church of the East
  - Armenian Apostolic Church
    - Armenian Apostolic Church
  - Protestanism
    - Armenian Evangelical Church
    - Protestant Church in Germany
    - Greek Evangelical Church
    - Anglicanism
    - The Church of Jesus Christ of Latter-day Saints
- Islam
  - Alevism
  - Quranism
    - Shi'a Islam
    - Alawites
    - Twelver
  - Sufism
  - Sunni Islam
- Judaism
  - Karaite
  - Orthodox
    - Hasidic
    - Modern Orthodox
- Tengrism
- Yazidism

=== Sports in Turkey ===
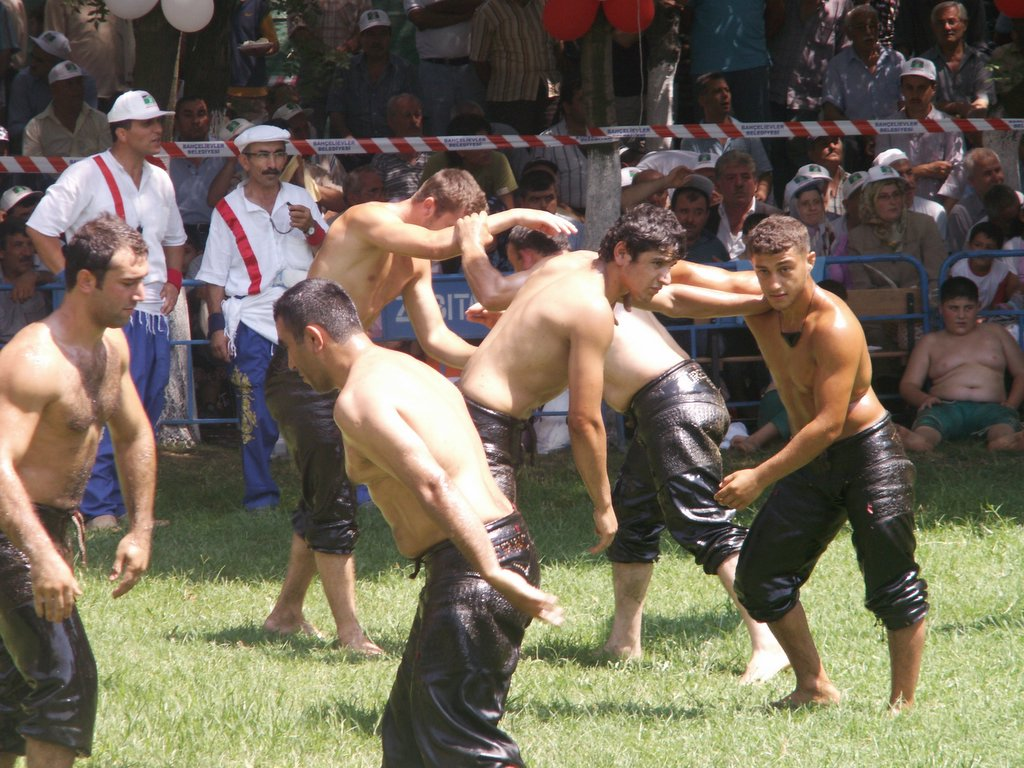
Oil wrestling is the national sport of Turkey.

Sports in Turkey

- Football in Turkey
- Football clubs in Turkey
- Turkey at the Olympics

== Economy and infrastructure of Turkey ==
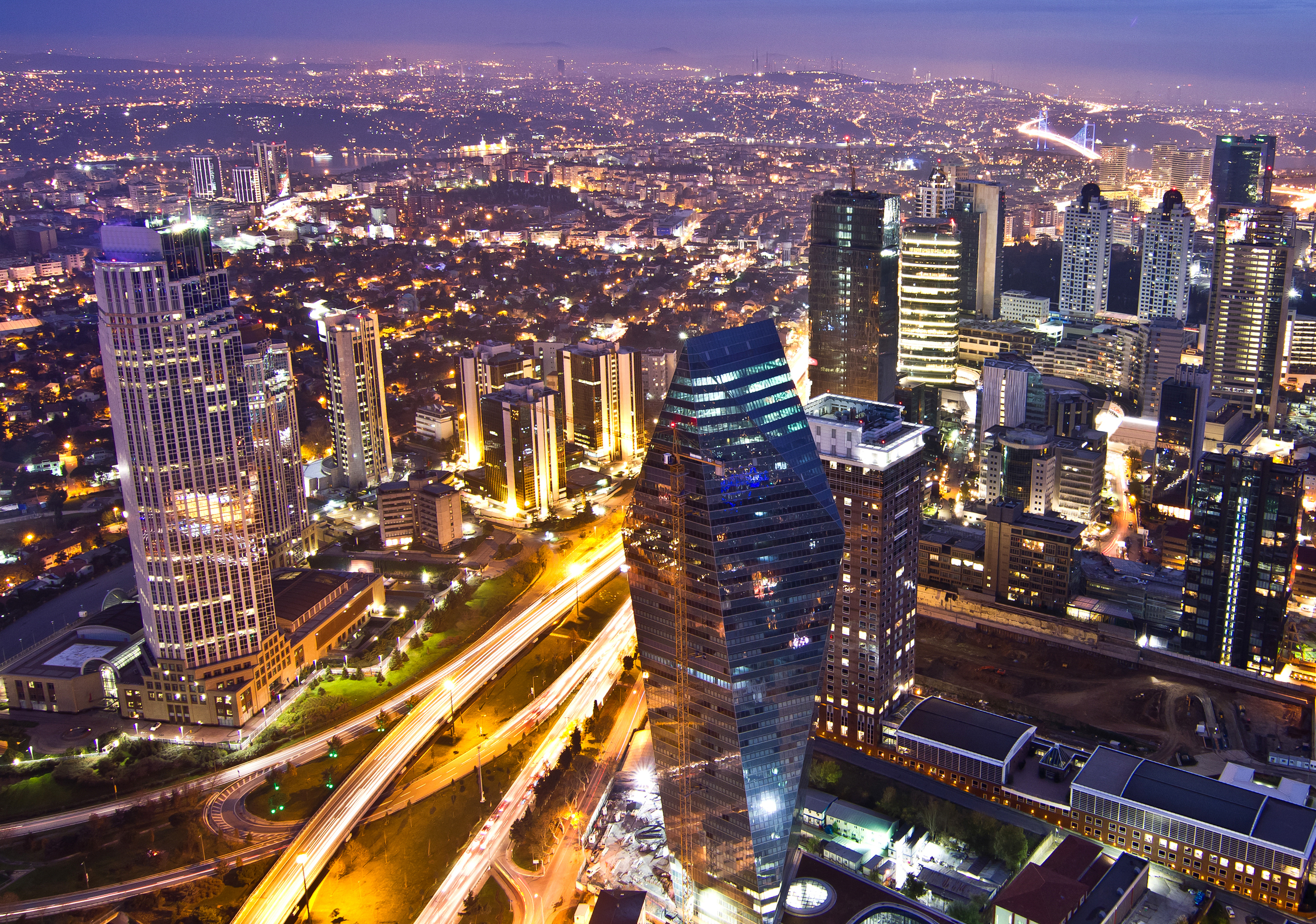
Financial district of Levent in Istanbul

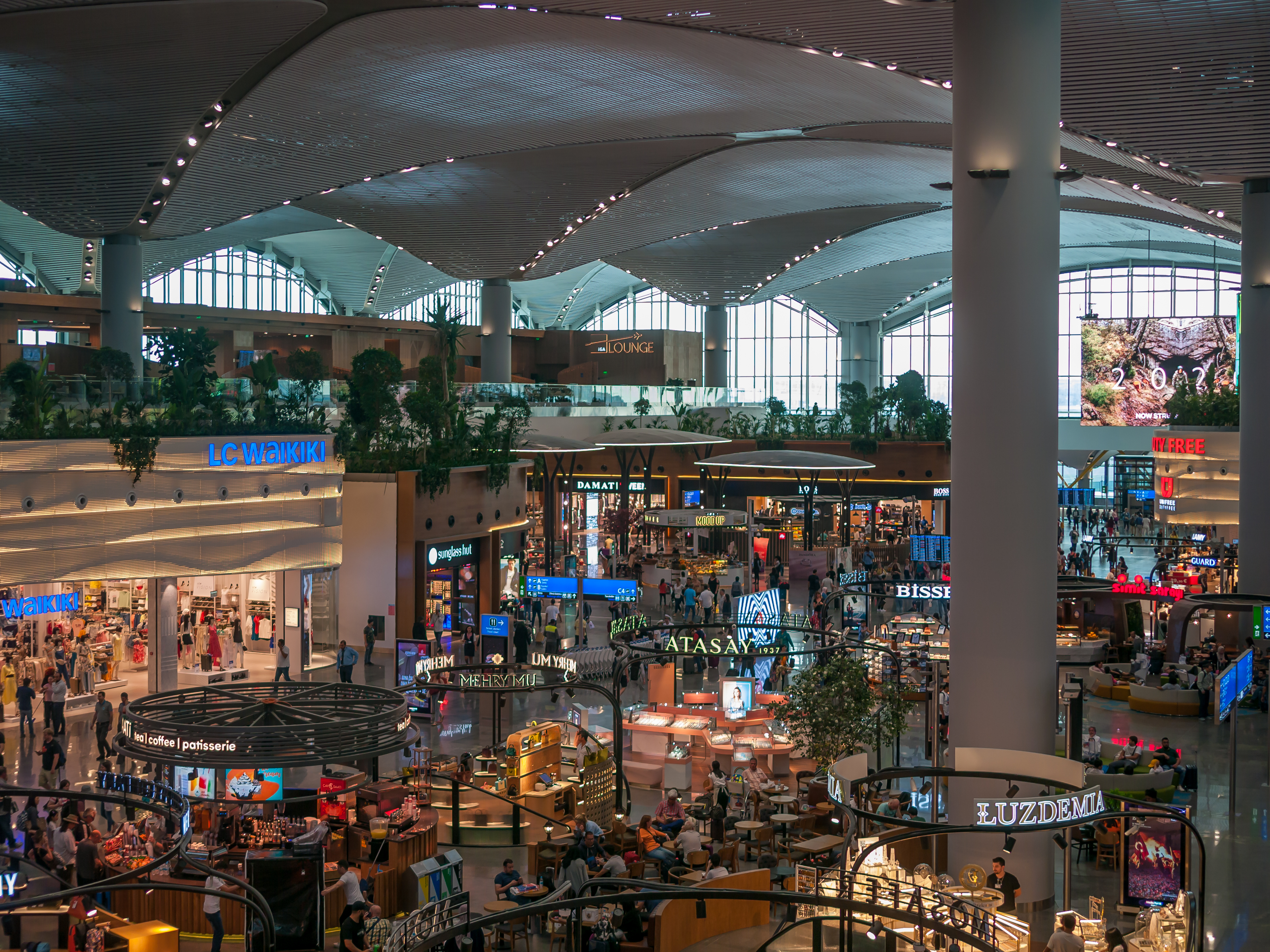
Istanbul Airport is the main international airport in Istanbul.

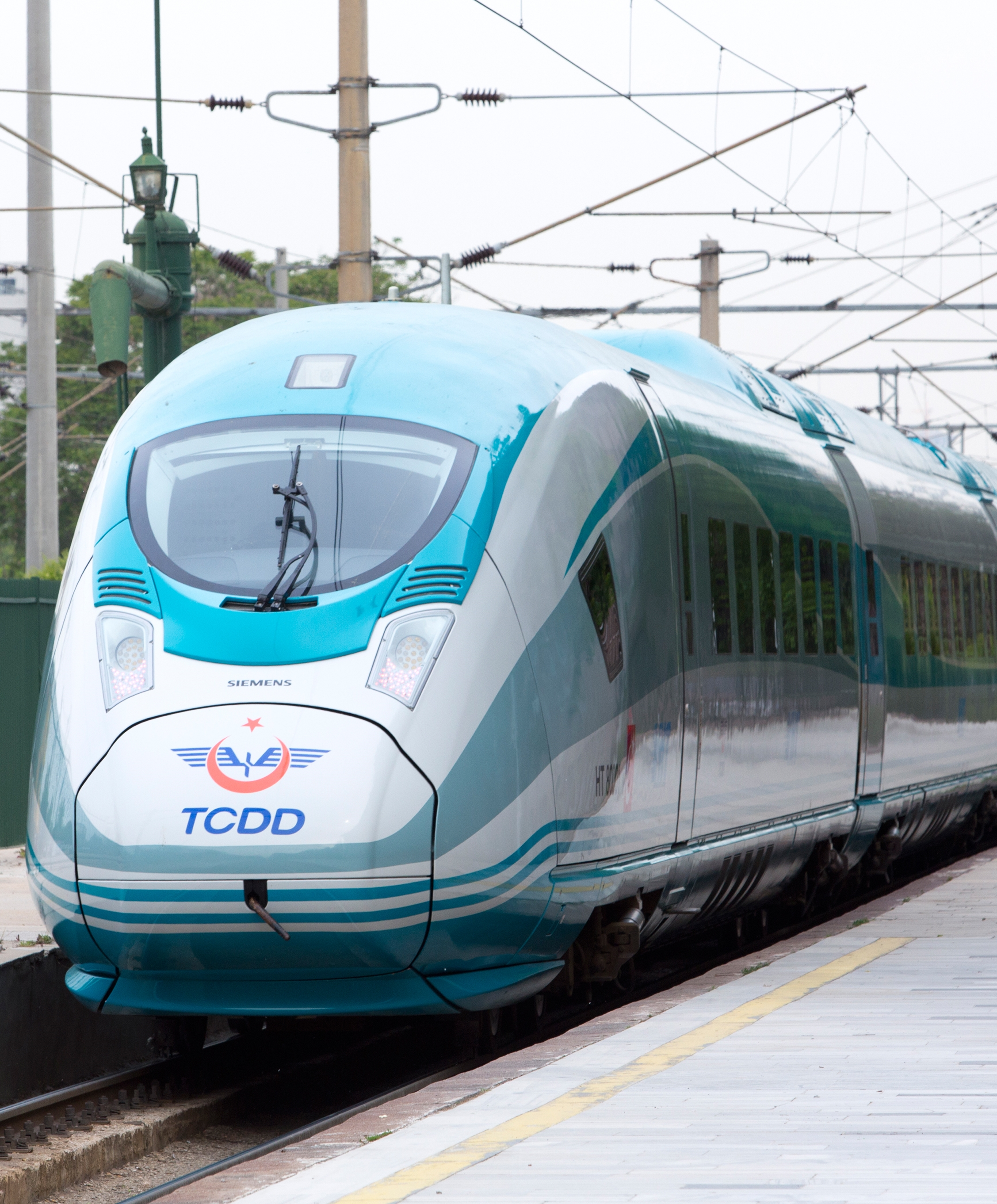
Turkey provides high-speed rail service with speeds up to 300 km/h (186 mph).

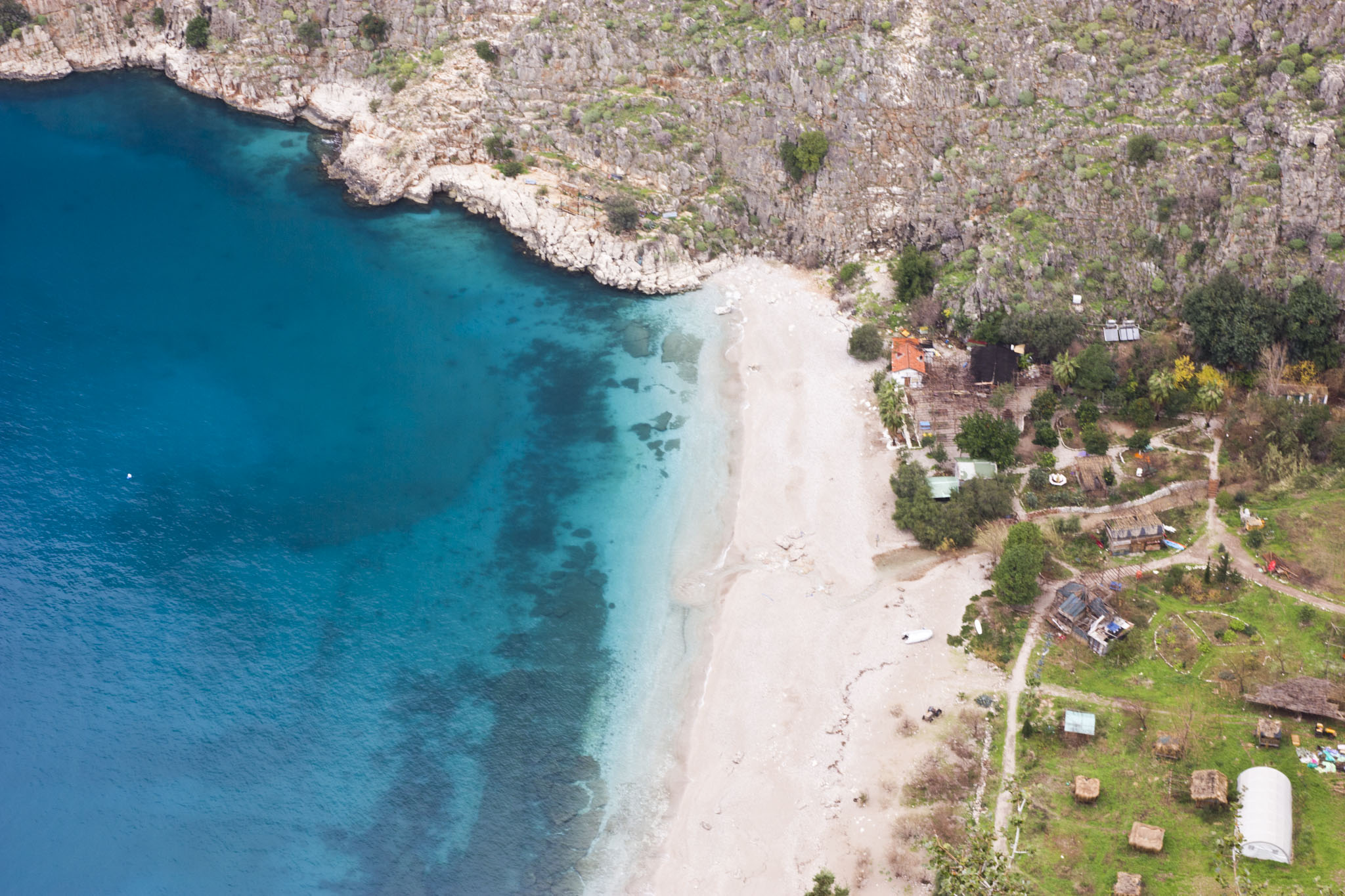
Butterfly Valley, home to 105 species of butterflies, is a popular tourist attraction.

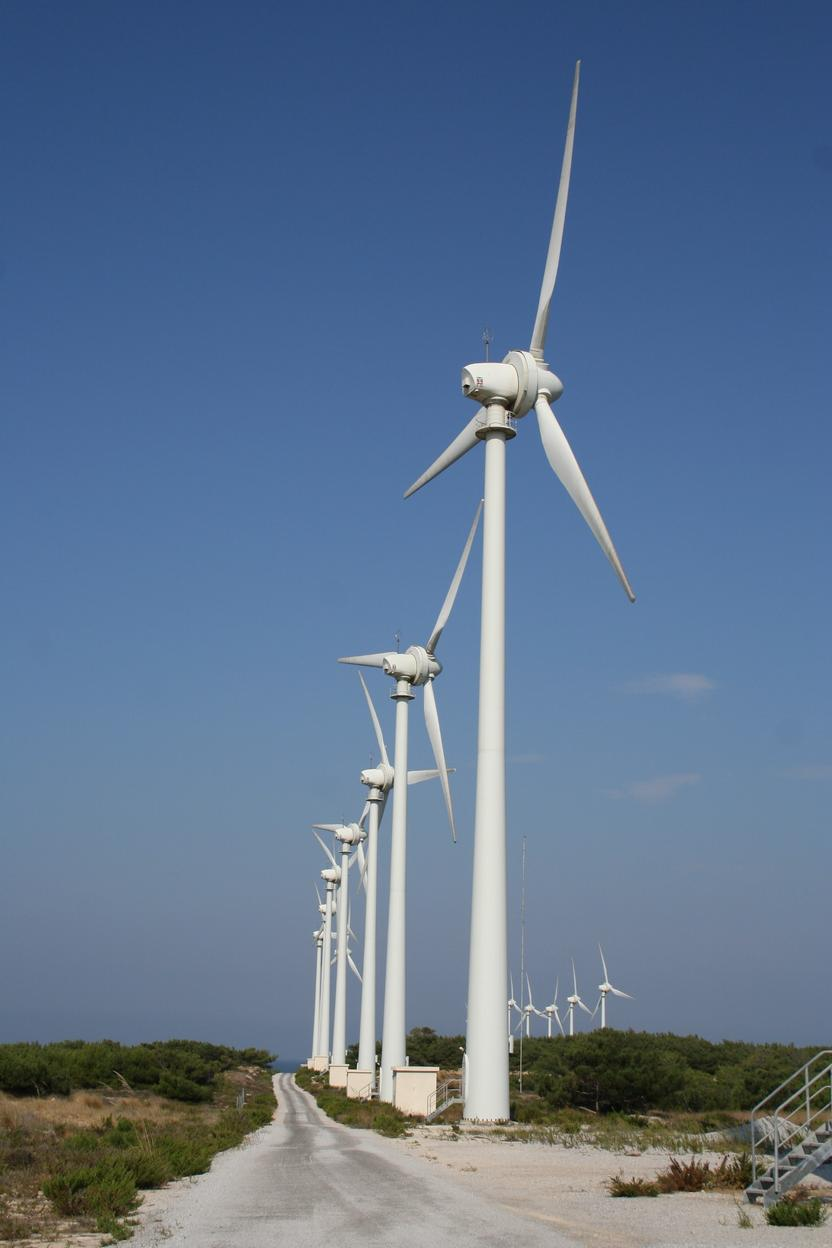
Wind farm on Bozcaada

- Economic rank, by nominal GDP(2021): 20th
- Economic rank, by GDP (PPP) (2021): 11th
- Currency of Turkey: ₺ Turkish lira
  - ISO 4217: TRY
- Banking in Turkey
  - Central Bank
  - List of banks in Turkey
- Telecommunications in Turkey
  - Internet in Turkey
    - Regional Internet Registry for Europe (RIPE NNC)
- Economic history of Turkey
  - National debt of Turkey
- Energy in Turkey
  - Energy policy of Turkey
  - Electricity sector in Turkey
    - Coal in Turkey
    - Nuclear energy in Turkey
    - Renewable energy in Turkey
      - Geothermal power in Turkey
      - Solar power in Turkey
      - Wind power in Turkey
  - Energy conservation in Turkey
  - Energy policy of Turkey
    - Department of Energy
    - Turkish energy law
- Health care in Turkey
- Industry trade groups in Turkey
- Tourism in Turkey
  - Shopping malls in Turkey
- Transportation in Turkey
  - Air transportation in Turkey
    - Airports in Turkey
  - Highway system in Turkey
  - Rail transport in Turkey
    - High-speed rail in Turkey
    - History of rail transport in Turkey
- Trade policy of Turkey
  - European Union Customs Union
  - Organisation for Economic Co-operation and Development
  - World Trade Organization
- Wealth in Turkey
  - Household income in Turkey
  - Income inequality in Turkey
  - Personal income in Turkey
  - Poverty in Turkey
  - Welfare in Turkey
- Water supply and sanitation in Turkey

== Education in Turkey ==
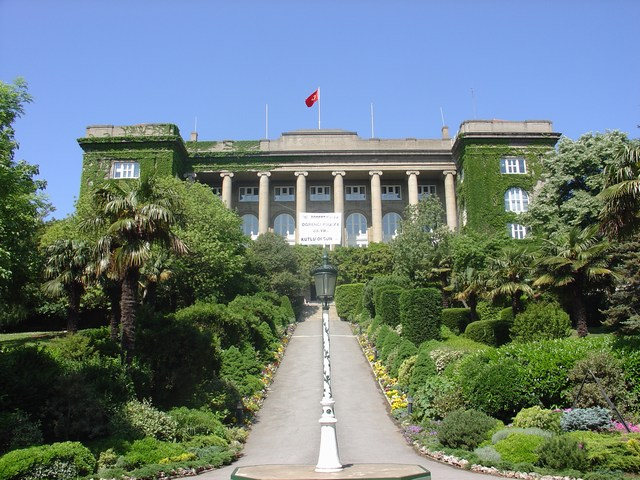
Robert College is a selective high school in Turkey.

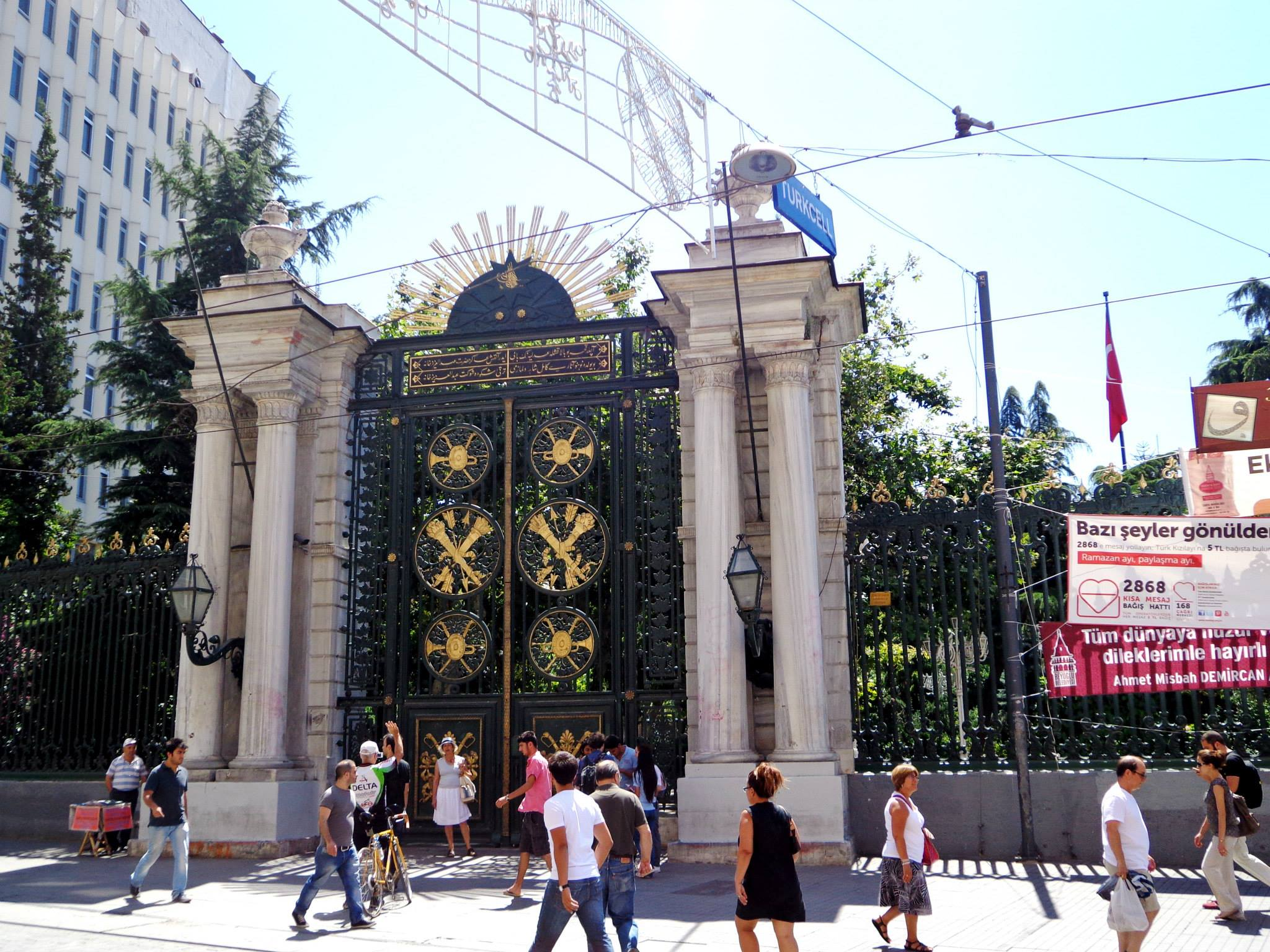
Galatasaray Lisesi (gate pictured) is a public high school in Istanbul that dates back to 1481.

- Higher education in Turkey
  - Medical education in Turkey
  - Legal education in Turkey
- List of schools in Turkey
  - List of private schools in Turkey
    - List of international schools in Turkey
    - List of yeshivas in Turkey
  - List of public schools in Turkey
  - Lists of universities and colleges
    - List of law schools in Turkey
    - List of medical schools in Turkey
- Anti-schooling activism in Turkey
- Department of Education in Turkey
  - Board of education in Turkey
  - Compulsory education in Turkey
- Foreign language education in Turkey
- Homeschooling in Turkey

== See also ==
- Topic overview:
  - Index of Turkey-related articles
