= Photography in Turkey =

Photography in Turkey began in the late nineteenth century.

== History ==
=== 19th century photography ===
Already in the 1870s printing companies were using photography in major coastal cities to document buildings and monuments for the municipal government, and to produce postcards for tourists. In this way cities like Smyrna (Izmir) and Trebizond (Trabzon) were documented in the late 19th century. The majority of these photographers and postcard editors were Greeks, Armenians and Italians. Outside Constantinople photography first took off in Trabzon. A photographer of Russian origin called Yermakov opened a photostudio in the city in 1868. Hatchik Tcholakian was an Armenian photographer who opened his studio in Trabzon in the 1870s. However, there were Turks active in the business as well. Kitabi Hamdi Efendi (Bookseller Hamdi), the Turkish owner of a printing house in Trabzon, was publishing his photographs (and those of others), and he sold photo cameras as well. Another Turkish photographer and postcard editor who was active from the late 19th century in Trabzon was Osman Nouri.

One of the first Turkish photographers by profession was Rahmizâde Bâhâeddin Bediz who opened his photostudio in Crete and later in Istanbul. He was active also in the first half of 20th century as a pioneer photographer in Turkey.

Further, as one of the earliest photographers in Turkey, Pascal Sébah, who was born in Istanbul, but not fully Turkish, had his photostudio in Istanbul.

=== Early 20th century ===
Further, Othmar Pferschy, non-Turkish photographer, opened his photo studio in Istanbul in 1931 and actively took documentary photographs.

=== Late 20th century and 21st century ===
In this period, there are emerging numerous Turkish photographers active in and outside of Turkey.

== Notable photographers ==
- Ali Sami Bey, chief imperial photographer of Sultan Abdülhamid II, later officer in the Greek Army.
- Ara Güler (16 August 1928 – 17 October 2018) was a Turkish Armenian photojournalist, nicknamed "the Eye of Istanbul" or "the Photographer of Istanbul".
- Ömer Asan, Ömer Şükrü Asan (born May 28, 1961, in Trabzon, Turkey), is a Turkish folklorist, photographer and writer.
- Mine Kasapoğlu (born 1979), female sports photographer
- Uğur Uluocak, Yaşar Uğur Uluocak (1962 – July 2, 2003) was a Turkish outdoorsman, mountaineer, photographer, and editor.

=== Non-Turkish photographers active in Turkey ===
- Maxime Du Camp
- James Robertson
- Dmitri Yermakov – Russian photographer who took the first known stills of Trabzon city center and Sumela monastery in the 1860s and 70s.

== Institutions ==
- İstanbul Modern, a.k.a. Istanbul Museum of Modern Art, (Turkish: İstanbul Modern Sanat Müzesi)
