= Pensions in Turkey =

Pensions in Turkey can be public or private. Article 60 of the 1982 Turkish constitution (similar to Article 48 of the 1961 constitution) states that "Everyone has the right to social security and the State shall take the necessary measures and establish the organization for the provision of social security."

== History ==
Until May 2006, there were three separate social security institutions:

- Sosyal Sigortalar Kurumu (Social Insurance Institution, SSK), for private and public sector workers
- Emekli Sandığı (Retirement Fund, ES), for civil servants
- Esnaf ve Sanatkârlar ve Diğer Bağımsız Çalışanlar Sosyal Sigortalar Kurumu (Tradesmen, Craftsmen, and Other Independent Workers Social Security Institution, Bağ-Kur), for self-employed workers and farmers.

In 2006 these were all merged into one institution, the Sosyal Güvenlik Kurumu (Social Security Institution, SGK).

== Current system ==
The state pension system is administered by the Sosyal Güvenlik Kurumu (Social Security Institution, SGK), which collects insurance contributions from employees and their employers, at the rate of 9% from employees and 11% from employers. Once someone who paid contributions to the SGK for the required amount of time reaches retirement age, they become eligible for an SGK pension, with the size of their pension determined by the amount of contributions they paid. In addition to SGK pensions, people can use the private pension system by paying additional contributions into private pension funds administered by insurance companies. The private pension system is regulated by law.

There is also a separate pension fund, OYAK, for members of the Turkish Armed Forces.

=== Defined contribution personal retirement savings accounts ===
The BES system (Individual Retirement pension System) was created in 2003, and has been actively promoted by the government. BES accounts are defined-contribution personal pension savings accounts, somewhat similar to 401(k) accounts in the US. Until 2013, the government matched 30% of contributions. In 2013 government matching contributions changed to %25, and in 2022, government contribution-matching increased again to %30. Government matching contributions vest over time, and can only be accessed after the account holder reaches a certain age. In 2017, the government introduced automatically-opened opt-out BES accounts, in which employers automatically open a BES account for all new employees, at a default 3% of their salary contributed monthly. Employees then have the option to leave the system (opt-out, reduce contributions etc). Since September 2020, BES account holders may take loans against their BES account as collateral.
