= Turkish economic crisis (2018–current) =

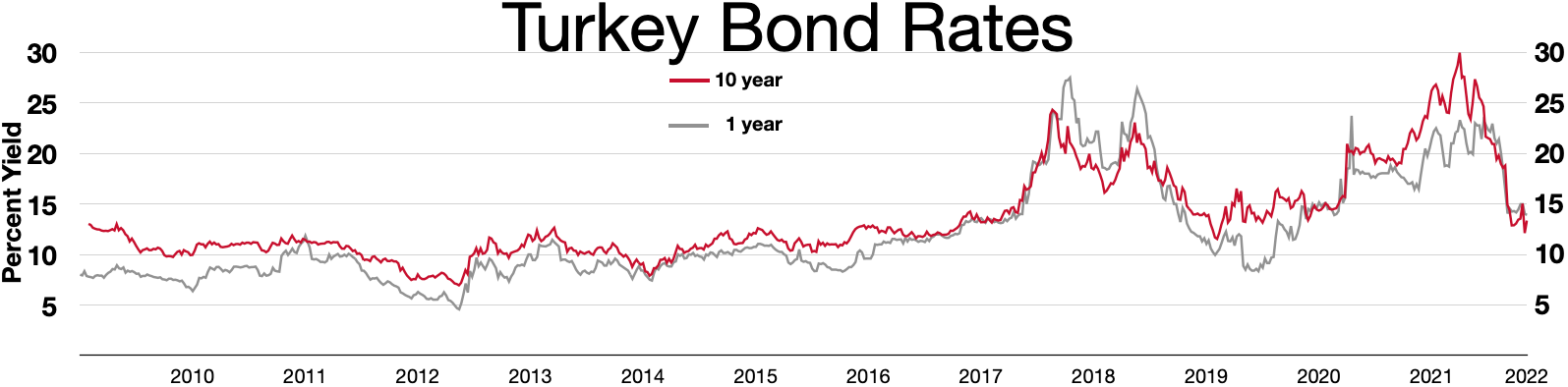
Turkey bond rates Inverted yield curve in 2018 and 2022 10 year bond 1 year bond

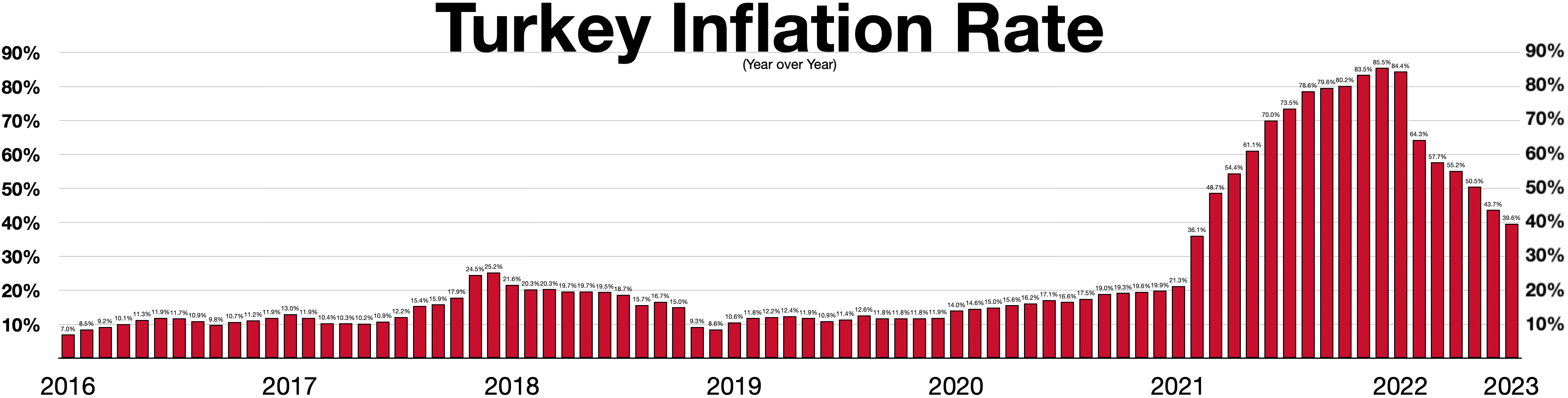
Turkey inflation rate (Year over Year)

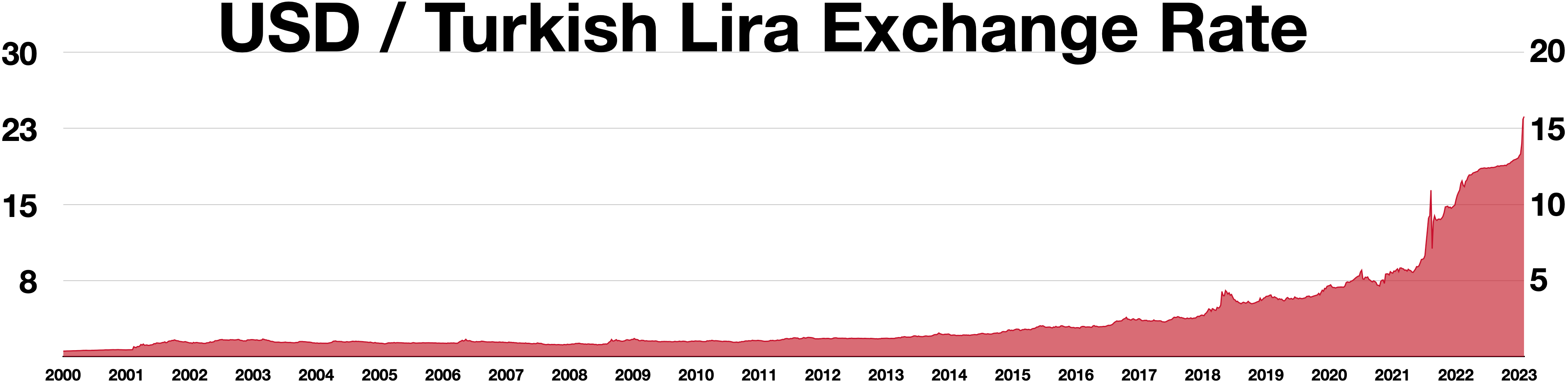
USD / Turkish Lira exchange rate

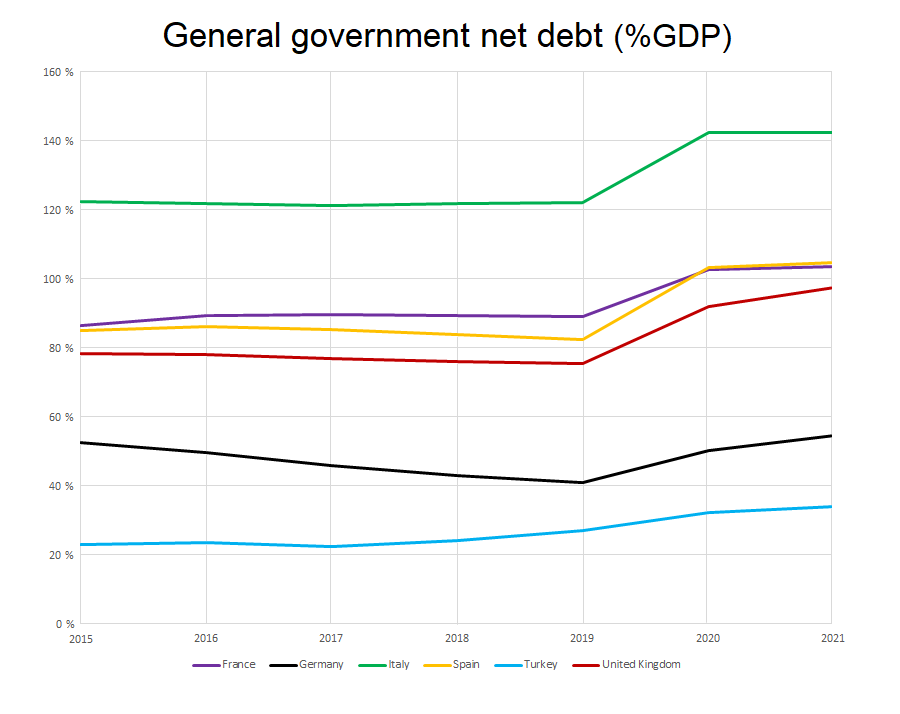
General government debt of selected European countries

The Turkish economic crisis (Turkish: Türkiye ekonomik krizi) is a financial and economic crisis in Turkey. It is characterized by the Turkish lira (TRY) plunging in value, high inflation, rising borrowing costs, and correspondingly rising loan defaults. The crisis was caused by the Turkish economy's excessive current account deficit and large amounts of private foreign-currency denominated debt.

Some analysts also stress the leveraging effects of the geopolitical frictions with the United States. Following the detention of American pastor Andrew Brunson, who was arrested on espionage charges after the failed 2016 Turkish coup d'état attempt, the Trump administration exerted pressure towards Turkey by imposing further sanctions. The economic sanctions therefore doubled the tariffs on Turkey, as imported steel rises up to 50% and on aluminum to 20%. As a result, Turkish steel was priced out of the US market, which previously amounted to 13% of Turkey's total steel exports.

After a period of modest recovery in 2020 and early 2021 amid the COVID-19 pandemic, the Turkish lira plunged following the replacement of Central Bank chief Naci Ağbal with Şahap Kavcıoğlu, who slashed interest rates from 19% to 14%. The lira lost 44% of its value in 2021 alone. In 2023, however, Erdoğan began to follow orthodox banking methods under the guidance of Mehmet Şimşek and Hafize Gaye Erkan. The interest rate has stood at 50% since March 2024 upon the advice of Fatih Karahan, the governor of the central bank who succeeded Erkan. This contributed to the decline of inflation, since as of November 2024, inflation is at 47.09%, down from its all-time high of 83%. As of July 2026 the YoY inflation stood on 31.75%.

More recently, political turmoil has further complicated the economic recovery. A series of anti-democratic crackdowns, including the high-profile detention of an Istanbul mayor and other opposition figures, have deepened market uncertainty and triggered sharp selloffs in equity markets. These events have prompted both domestic and international policymakers to scramble: Finance Minister Mehmet Şimşek and central bank officials have engaged in calls with international investors, while authorities have also taken measures such as banning short selling and relaxing buyback rules in an effort to stabilize the markets. Meanwhile, rating agencies and international observers warn that the ongoing political repression may derail broader reform efforts and threaten Turkey's fragile economic stabilization.

== Current account deficit and foreign-currency debt ==
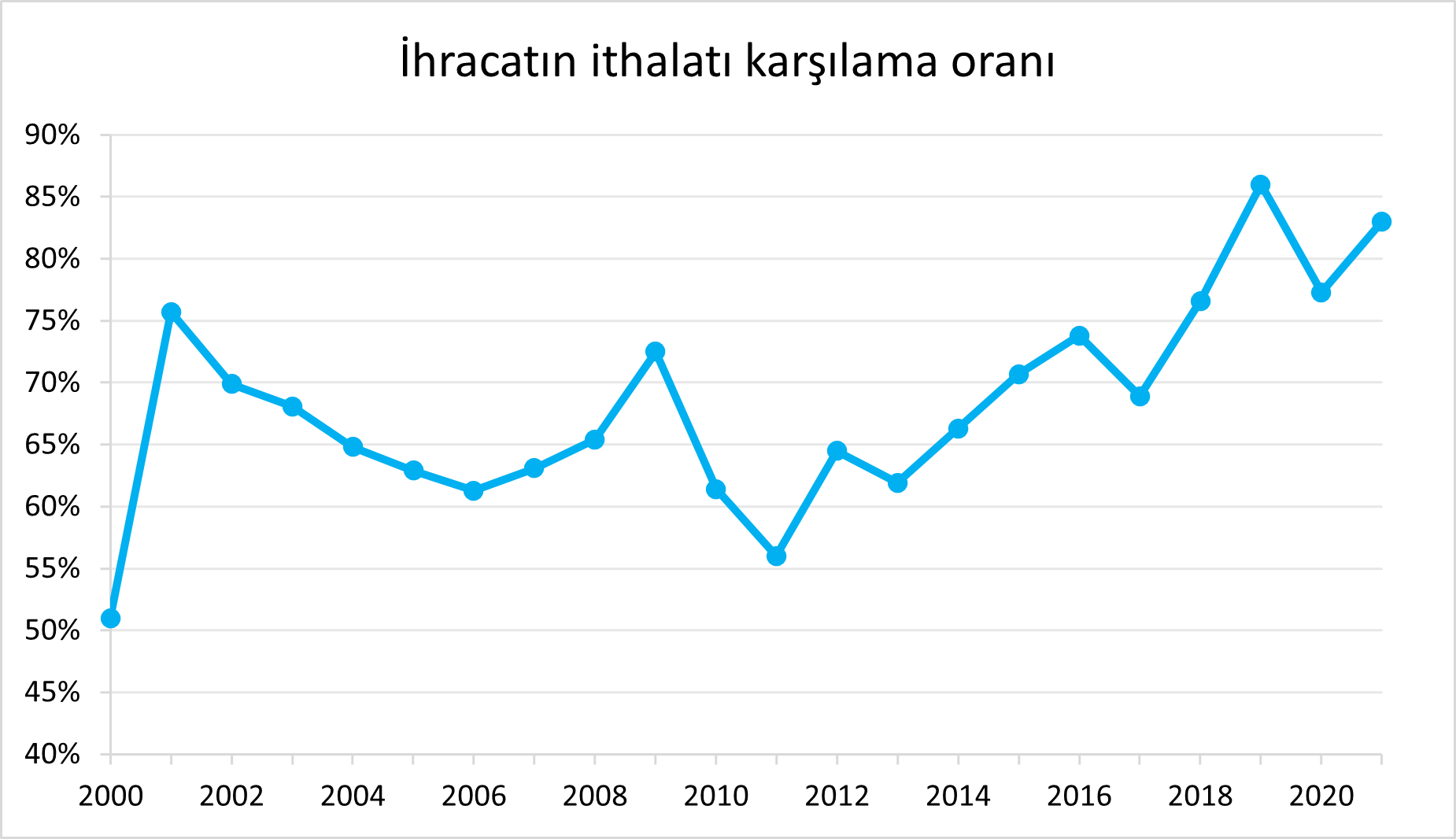
Turkey's exports as percentage of imports

A longstanding characteristic of Turkey's economy is a low savings rate. Since Recep Tayyip Erdoğan assumed control of the government, Turkey has been running huge and growing current account deficits, $33.1 billion in 2016 and $47.3 billion in 2017, climbing to US$7.1 billion in the month of January 2018 with the rolling 12-month deficit rising to $51.6 billion, one of the largest current account deficits in the world. The economy has relied on capital inflows to fund private-sector excess, with Turkey's banks and big firms borrowing heavily, often in foreign currencies. Under these conditions, Turkey must find approximately $200 billion a year to fund its wide current account deficit and maturing debt, while being always at risk of inflows drying up; the state has gross foreign currency reserves of just $85 billion. The economic policy underlying these trends had increasingly been micro-managed by Erdoğan since the election of his Justice and Development Party (AKP) in 2002, and strongly so since 2008, with a focus on the construction industry, state-awarded contracts and stimulus measures. Although, research and development expenditure of the country (% of GDP) and the government expenditure on education (% of GDP) are nearly doubled during AKP governments, the desired outcomes could not be achieved The motive for these policies have been described as Erdoğan losing faith in Western-style capitalism since the 2008 financial crisis by the secretary general of the main Turkish business association, TUSIAD. Although not directly related in the conflict, the Turkish invasion of Afrin largely strained US-Turkish relations, and led to mass instability in Syria. This led to a global view of Turkey as an unnecessary aggressor.

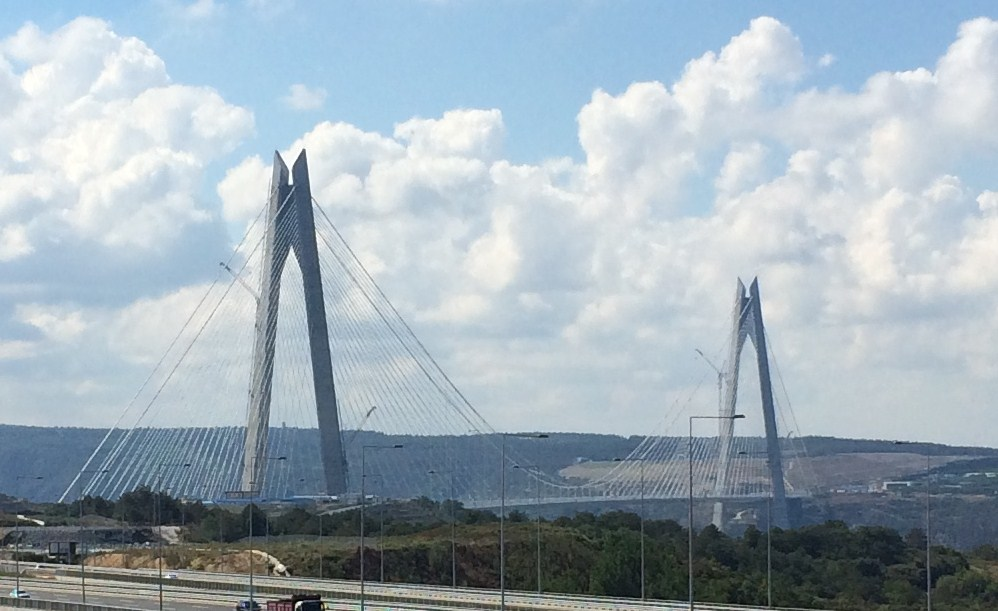
Previous economic growth had been led by fiscal and monetary stimulus to the construction industry, resulting in a huge backlog of unsold new houses, and unprofitable grand projects like the Yavuz Sultan Selim Bridge; its operator is guaranteed 135k passenger car-equivalent of daily toll revenue.

Investment inflows had already been declining in the period leading up to the crisis, owing to Erdoğan instigating political disagreements with countries that were major sources of such inflows (such as Germany, France, and the Netherlands). Following the 2016 coup attempt, the government seized the assets of those it stated were involved, even if their ties to the coup were tenuous. Erdoğan has not taken seriously concerns that foreign companies investing in Turkey might be deterred by the country's political instability. Other factors include worries about the decreasing value of lira (TRY) which threatens to eat into investors' profit margins. Investment inflows have also declined because Erdoğan's increasing authoritarianism has quelled free and factual reporting by financial analysts in Turkey. Between January and May 2017, foreign portfolio investors funded $13.2 billion of Turkey's $17.5 billion current account deficit, according to the latest available data. During the same period in 2018, they plugged just $763 million of a swollen $27.3 billion deficit.

By the end of 2017, the corporate foreign-currency debt in Turkey had more than doubled since 2009, up to $214 billion after netting against their foreign-exchange assets. Turkey's gross external debt, both public and private, stood at $453.2 billion at the end of 2017. As of March 2018, $181.8 billion of external debt, public and private, was due to mature within a year. Non-resident holdings of domestic shares stood at $53.3 billion in early March and at $39.6 billion in mid-May, and non-resident holdings of domestic government bonds stood at $32.0 billion in early March and at $24.7 billion in mid-May. Overall non-residents' ownership of Turkish equities, government bonds and corporate debt has plummeted from a high of $92 billion in August 2017 to just $53 billion as of 13 July 2018.

== Government's 'action plans' to confront the crisis ==
In 2018, the finance minister of the Turkish government, Albayrak unveiled a new economic program to stave off the financial crisis. The three-year plan aims to "reign in inflation, spur growth and cut the current account deficit". The plan includes reduction on the government expenditures by $10 billion and suspension of the projects whose tender have not been carried out yet. The transformational phase of the plan will be focusing on value-added areas to increase the country's export volume and long-term production capacity with the goal of creating two million new jobs by 2021. The program is expected to lower economic growth substantially in the short term (from a previous forecast of 5.5% to 3.8% in 2018 and 2.3% in 2019) but with a gradual growth increase by 2021 towards 5%.

== Presidential interference with the central bank ==
Turkey has experienced substantially higher inflation than other emerging markets. In October 2017, inflation was at 11.9%, the highest rate since July 2008. In 2018, the lira's exchange rate accelerated deterioration, reaching a level of 4.0 TRY per USD by late March, 4.5 TRY per USD by mid-May, 5.0 TRY per USD by early August and 6.0 as well as 7.0 TRY per USD by mid-August. Among economists, the accelerating loss of value was generally attributed to Recep Tayyip Erdoğan preventing the Central Bank of the Republic of Turkey from making the necessary interest rate adjustments.

Erdoğan, who said interest rates beyond his control to be "the mother and father of all evil", shared his unorthodox interest rate theories in a 14 May interview with Bloomberg and said that "the central bank can't take this independence and set aside the signals given by the president." Presidential intervention with central bank policy comes with a general perception in international investment circles of a "textbook institutional decline" in Turkey, with Erdoğan seen increasingly reliant on politicians whose main qualifications for their jobs is loyalty, at the expense of more qualified and experienced options. Erdoğan also has a long history of voicing Islamist discourse of interest-based banking as "prohibited by Islam" and "a serious dead-end". He is also on record referring to interest rate increases as "treason". Despite Erdogan's opposition, Turkey's Central Bank made sharp interest rates increases.

The Financial Times quoted leading emerging markets financial analyst Timothy Ash analyzing that "Turkey has strong banks, healthy public finances, good demographics, pro-business culture but [has been] spoiled over past four to five years by unorthodox and loose macroeconomic management." By mid-June, analysts in London suggested that with its current government, Turkey would be well advised to seek an International Monetary Fund loan even before the dwindling central bank foreign exchange reserves run out, because it would strengthen the central bank's hand against Erdoğan and help gain back investor confidence in the soundness of Turkey's economic policies.

Economist Paul Krugman described the unfolding crisis as "a classic currency-and-debt crisis, of a kind we've seen many times", adding: "At such a time, the quality of leadership suddenly matters a great deal. You need officials who understand what's happening, can devise a response and have enough credibility that markets give them the benefit of the doubt. Some emerging markets have those things, and they are riding out the turmoil fairly well. The Erdoğan regime has none of that."

In March 2021, Erdoğan fired Naci Ağbal, the governeor of the central bank. This led to shock in financial markets according to the Christian Science Monitor. In his stead, Erdoğan appointed a newspaper columnist who according to the Monitor agrees with Erdoğan's economic views.

In August 2023, Turkey's central bank raised interest rates by 7.5 points to 25% to tackle inflation, signaling a shift from previous policies. President Erdoğan's new economics team aims to restore policy orthodoxy and stabilize the economy. Despite the positive currency response, the lira remains near historic lows.

== Consequences in Turkey ==
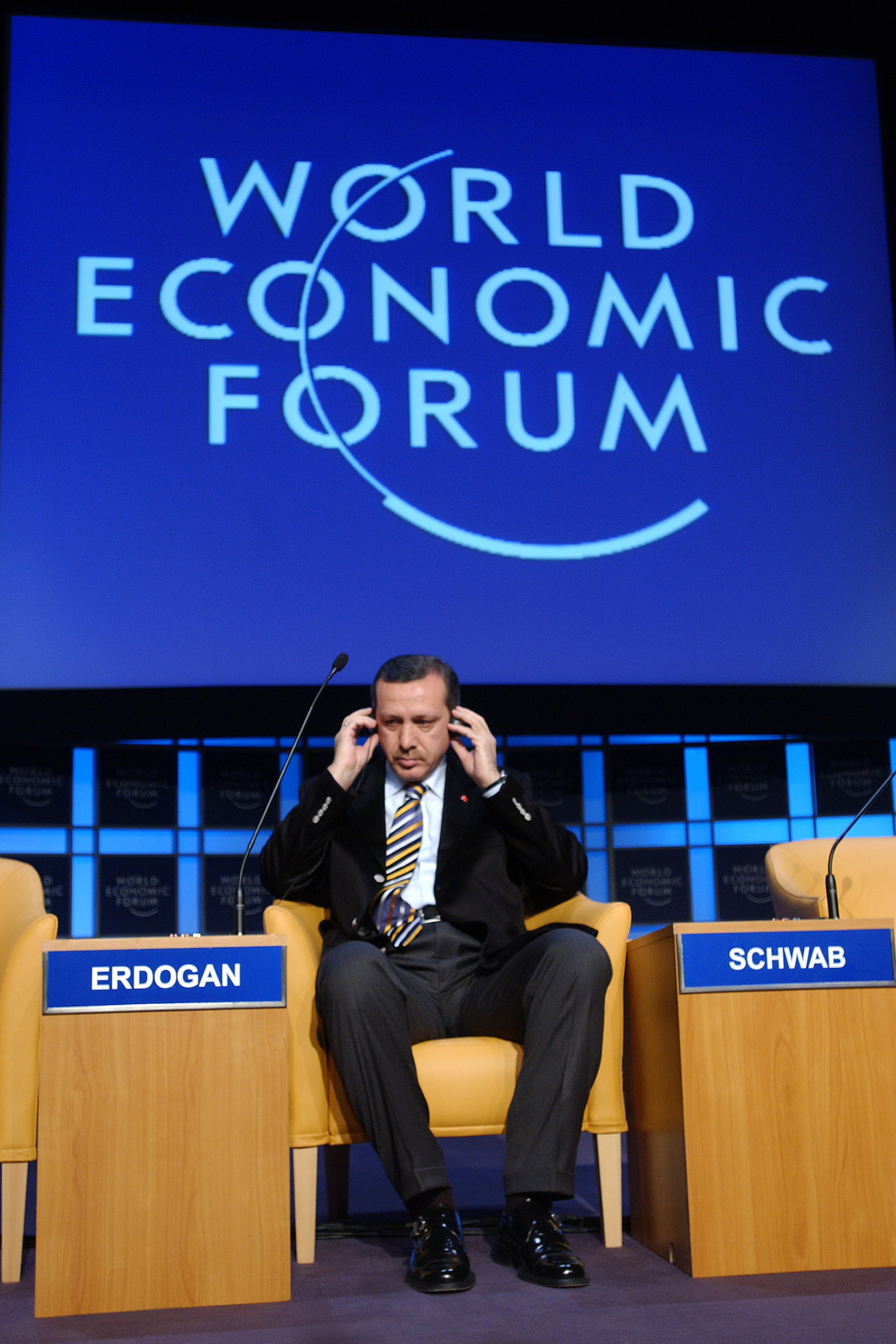
Recep Tayyip Erdoğan's unorthodox views on interest rates are stated to be one of the most important causes of the crisis.

During the emergence of the crisis, lenders in Turkey were hit by restructuring demands of corporations unable to serve their USD or EUR denominated debt, due to the loss of value of their earnings in Turkish lira. While financial institutions had been the driver of the Istanbul stock exchange for many years, accounting for almost half its value, by mid-April they accounted for less than one-third. By late-May, lenders were facing a surge in demand from companies seeking to reorganise debt repayments. By early-July, public restructuring requests by some of the country's biggest businesses alone already totalled $20,000,000,000 with other debtors not publicly listed or large enough to require disclosures. The asset quality of Turkish banks, as well as their capital adequacy ratio, kept deteriorating throughout the crisis. By June Halk Bankası, the most vulnerable of the large lenders, had lost 63% of its US dollar value since last summer and traded at 40% of book value. However, it is hard to say that this is mainly due to the economic developments in Turkey since the valuation of Halkbank was largely affected by the rumors over the possible outcomes of the US investigation about the bank's stated help to Iran in evading US sanctions.

Banks continuously heightened interest rates for business and consumer loans and mortgage loan rates, towards 20% annually, thus curbing demand from businesses and consumers. With a corresponding growth in deposits, the gap between total deposits and total loans, which had been one of the highest in emerging markets, began to narrow. Nevertheless, this development has also led to incomplete or unoccupied housing and commercial real estate littering the outskirts of Turkey's major cities, as Erdoğan's policies had fuelled the construction sector, where many of his business allies are very active, to lead past economic growth. In March 2018, home sales fell 14% and mortgage sales declined 35% compared to a year earlier. As of May, Turkey had around 2,000,000 unsold houses, a backlog three times the size of the average annual number of new housing sales. In the first half of 2018, unsold stock of new housing kept increasing, while increases in new home prices in Turkey were lagging consumer price inflation by more than 10 percentage points.

While heavy portfolio capital outflows persisted, $883,000,000 in June, with official foreign exchange reserves declining by a $6,990,000,000 during June, the current account deficit started narrowing in June, due to the weakened exchange rate for the lira. This was perceived as a sign of getting balanced economy. Turkish Lira started recover its losses as of September 2018 and the current account deficit continued to shrink.

As a consequence of the earlier monetary policy of easy money, any newfound fragile short-term macroeconomic stability is based on higher interest rates, thus creating a recessionary effect for the Turkish economy. In mid-June, the Washington Post carried the quote from a senior financial figure in Istanbul that "years of irresponsible policies have overheated the Turkish economy. High inflation rates and current account deficits are going to prove sticky. I think we are at the end of our rope."

=== Suicides ===
In January 2018, a worker self-immolated in front of Parliament..

In February 2020, Adem Yarıcı, 42, who was unemployed for a long time, burnt himself in front of the office of the governor of Hatay, screaming "my children are hungry" on 7 February 2020; he later died. The Hatay governorship stated that he had received assistance from social services, and suffered from psychological problems.

In November 2019 four siblings were found dead in an apartment in Fatih, Istanbul, having committed suicide because they were unable to pay their bills. The price of electricity increased in 2019 around 57% and youth unemployment stood around 27%. The electricity bill for the apartment had not been paid for several months.

A family of four including two children 9 and 5 years old was similarly found in Antalya. A note left behind detailed the financial difficulties the family was experiencing.

In mid-November The Guardian reported that an anonymous benefactor had paid off some debts at local grocery stores in Tuzla and left envelopes of cash on doorstops after the suicides.

AK Parti officials and media have denied that the recent deaths were caused by the rising cost of living.

=== Collapse of birth rates ===
The collapse of birth rates in Turkey have been attributed to the ongoing economic crisis. The total fertility rate (TFR) dropped from 2.00 in 2018 to 1.48 in 2024, with 937,599 live births recorded that year. Persistent inflation, rising housing costs, job insecurity, and declining real incomes have been cited as the reasons for the collapse.

=== Timeline of events (2018) ===
- 12 February – Yıldız Holding unexpectedly requested to restructure as much as $7,000,000,000 in loans.
- 21 February – Cemil Ertem, senior economic adviser to President Recep Tayyip Erdoğan, published an opinion piece in the Daily Sabah suggesting that the IMF's policy advice for Turkey's central bank to raise short term interest rates should be ignored and that "not only Turkey, but all developing countries, should do the opposite of what the IMF preaches."
- 5 April – Mehmet Şimşek, the Deputy Prime Minister in charge of the economy, sought to resign due to disagreement with Erdoğan about the latter's interference with central bank policy; but was later convinced to withdraw his resignation.
- 7 April – Doğuş Holding applied to their banks for debt restructuring. Doğuş' outstanding loans stood at the equivalent of 23,500,000,000 Turkish lira (£2,765,597,500) at the end of 2017; up 11% from the year before.
- 18 April – Erdoğan announced that the upcoming general election would be held on 24 June, eighteen months earlier than scheduled.
- 14 and 15 May – In a televised interview with Bloomberg and in a meeting with global money managers in London, Erdoğan said that after the elections, he intended to take greater control of the economy, including de facto control over monetary policy, and to implement lower interest rates; this caused "shock and disbelief" among investors about the central bank's ability to fight inflation and stabilise the lira.
- 23 May – Foreign exchange bureaus in Istanbul temporarily stopped trading amidst an extreme dive in the price of the lira. On the same day, the Turkish Statistical Institute reported another slip in consumer confidence over the month of May, with all sub-indices decreasing. On 25 May 2018, it reported a sharp drop in confidence in Turkey's services, retail trade, and construction sectors over the month of May. Also on the same day, the Central Bank of Turkey raised interest rates at an emergency meeting of its Monetary Policy Committee, bowing to pressure from financial markets. The central bank raised its late liquidity window rate by 300 basis points to 16.5%. Taken against the vociferous objections of Erdoğan, this step brought temporary relief for the lira exchange rate.
- 28 May – Turkey's central bank announced an operational simplification of its monetary policy, effective 1 June, coming with the announcement of another interest rate hike. The one-week repo rate, at 8 percent—currently not used—is to be raised to 16.5 percent and become the future benchmark of monetary policy. The current benchmark late liquidity window rate, now at 16.5 percent, will be fixed at 150 basis points above the one-week repo rate, which would now be 18 percent. The lira somewhat firmed in response.
- 30 May – The Turkish Statistical Institute reported economic confidence sliding steeply in May to a value of 93.5, the lowest level in 15 months, since the aftermath of the 2016 coup attempt.
- 30 May – GAMA Holding sought to ease repayment terms for $1.5 billion of loans with creditors.
- 30 May – Turkey's central bank released minutes of the crucial 23 May Monetary Policy Committee meeting, saying that "the tight stance in monetary policy will be maintained decisively until the inflation outlook displays a significant improvement and becomes consistent with the targets", the latter being 5 percent by law.

The Turkish lira has a history of accelerating loss of value relative to the euro, breaching the mark of five lira per euro in early-2018

- 1 June – The Istanbul Chamber of Industry published its index of manufacturing in Turkey for the month of May, stating that with a sharp drop for the second consecutive month, manufacturing conditions deteriorated to the worst since 2009, elaborating that "inflationary pressures remained marked in May, cost burdens continued to rise in the manufacturing sector."
- 4 June – Turkey's statistics institute reported the annual inflation rate for May as risen to 12.2 percent from 10.9 percent the previous month, just below a 14-year high of last November, while monthly inflation was 1.6 percent.
- 6 June – At the Borsa Istanbul, Turkey's main stock index BIST-100 dropped 1.5 percent to the lowest level in dollar terms since the 2008 financial crisis.
- 7 June – Turkey's central bank at its regular Monetary Policy Committee meeting raised its benchmark repo rate by 125 basis points to 17.75 percent. The move beat market expectations, resulting in immediate gains for the lira, and the yield on the benchmark 10-year lira bond eased, after touching a record-high 15.41 percent on 6 June.
- 10 June – Turkey's Automotive Manufacturers Association published data for the month of May, showing car sales sliding to the lowest level since 2014. Passenger car sales slumped by 13 percent when compared to May 2017, while sales of commercial vehicles dropped 19 percent.
- 11 June – Turkey's central bank released financial data for April, with the account deficit widening by $1.7 billion to $5.4 billion.
- 13 June – Turkish President Recep Tayyip Erdoğan's senior economic adviser Cemil Ertem in an opinion piece in the Daily Sabah said that the unorthodox idea that it would be wrong to see inflation as a monetary phenomenon, leading to a sharp slide in the value of the lira and of Turkey's benchmark 10-year lira bonds, with yields on the latter reaching a record-high of 16.25 percent.
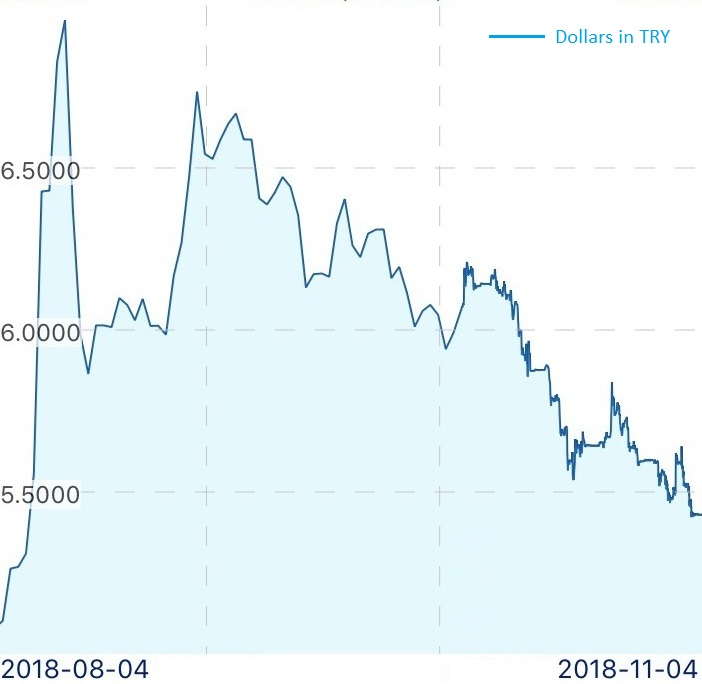
  The Turkish Lira regained a significant proportion of its losses within the three months after July 2018. According to the models by IMF and International Institute of Finance made at the time, the lira was getting closer to the fair value but was still slightly undervalued.
- 14 June – Turkish President Recep Tayyip Erdoğan in a televised interview said that his government would "conduct an operation against" international credit ratings agency Moody's Investors Service following elections on 24 June. The next day, the lira finished its worst week since 2008, tumbling 5.7 per cent relative to the dollar, while also hitting its worst weekend close ever at US$4.73/TRY.
- 24 June – In the Turkish general election, Erdoğan retained the office of president while his Justice and Development Party (AKP) narrowly lost its majority in parliament but achieved such majority together with its alliance partner the Nationalist Movement Party (MHP). The day after, the Turkish Industry and Business Association (TÜSİAD) urgently called for economic reforms.
- 28 June – The Turkish Statistical Institute reported its economic confidence index dropping in June for the fifth straight month, with construction sector confidence leading the declines.

The debt default of Türk Telekom was Turkey's biggest ever.

- 3 July – The Turkish Statistical Institute reported that Turkey's annual inflation rate surged to 15.4 percent in June, the highest level since 2003. Consumer price inflation climbed 2.6 percent month-on-month in June, exceeding annual price increases in many developed economies. Turkey's annual inflation rate now was about four times the average in emerging markets. Producer price increases accelerated to 23.7 percent from 20.2 percent the previous month. On the same day, the Automotive Distributors Association said that sales of the commercial vehicles sank 44 percent in June from June 2017, while car sales fell 38 percent.
- 5 July – Bloomberg reported that Turkish and international banks were taking control of Türk Telekom, Turkey's biggest telephone company, due to billions of dollars in unpaid debt. Creditors set up a special purpose vehicle to acquire the company as they try to resolve Turkey's biggest-ever debt default. The same day, Bereket Enerji group was reported seeking buyers for two power plants as it negotiates with banks to refinance $4 billion in debt.
- 9 July – Erdoğan appointed his son-in-law Berat Albayrak as economic chief of his new administration, in charge of a new ministry of treasury and finance. Erdoğan also appointed Mustafa Varank, a close adviser who had overseen a pro-government social media team on Twitter and elsewhere, to industry minister, the other key economy portfolio. These announcement fueled investor unease about competence and orthodoxy of economic policymaking, with the Turkish lira losing 3.8 percent of its value within one hour after Albayrak's appointment. Same day, Erdoğan by presidential decree appropriated to himself the authority to appoint the central bank governor, his deputies and the monetary policy committee members.
- 11 July – The lira dropped 2.5 percent to 4.82 per dollar, its weakest level since falling to an all-time low of 4.92 against the U.S. currency in May. The stock market in Istanbul dropped 5.2 percent to 91.290 points. Yields on government debt surged. The next day, the lira touched an all-time low of 4.98 lira for a US dollar. Two days later, the lira recorded its biggest weekly slump in almost a decade. The benchmark Borsa Istanbul 100 Index fell the most since the foiled coup in 2016, with the selloff dragging price-to-estimated earnings valuations to the lowest in more than nine years. The 10-year government bond yield surged almost 100 basis points this week.
- 19 July – ÇEL-MER Çelik Endüstrisi, a leading Turkish steel producer also operating in the automobile sector, agriculture, white goods, machinery production and the defence industry, sought bankruptcy protection from the courts after it failed to repay its debts.
- 20 July – Ozensan Taahhut, a large Turkish construction company which has carried out construction contracts for state housing authority TOKI, the Justice Ministry, the Health Ministry and various municipalities, filed for bankruptcy protection.
- 24 July – The Central Bank of Turkey at a meeting of its Monetary Policy Committee unexpectedly left the benchmark interest rate for its lending unchanged at 17.75 percent despite the latest hike in inflation, leading to a selloff in the lira currency as well as in Turkey's dollar-denominated government bonds and in Turkey's stock market. In the words of Brad Bechtel, global head of foreign exchange at US investment bank Jefferies, the central bank's decision to hold rates left Turkey as "the pariah of emerging markets".
- 31 July – Turkey's central bank acknowledged it will not meet its 5 percent inflation target for three more years, disappointing investors seeking signs that monetary policy would tighten. Although Governor Murat Cetinkaya pledged to raise borrowing costs when needed, he predicted 13.4 percent inflation through this year, 9.3 percent through 2019 and 6.7 percent by the end of 2020. The same day, the Turkish lira heading for its longest streak of monthly losses since an International Monetary Fund bailout in 2001, the Banks Association of Turkey (TBB) drew up a framework of principles for restructuring loans that exceed 50 million lira: If lenders with exposure to at least 75 percent of the total owed agree, a committee of lenders should order measures such as changes to shareholder structure and management, asset sales, spinoffs and capital injections, resolving restructurings within 150 days.
- 1 August – Due to the weakening lira, Turkey's state pipeline operator BOTAŞ raised the price of natural gas used by electric power plants by 50 percent. BOTAŞ also raised natural gas prices for residential use. The same day, the energy regulation authority raised electricity prices for industrial and residential use. Also the same day, the Istanbul Chamber of Industry said in a monthly survey of manufacturers that producer price inflation in July accelerated to the highest pace in more than a decade, after already having accelerated to 23.7 percent in June due to the Erdoğan government stimulating economic growth with a series of measures ahead of elections on 24 June.
- 3 August – The Turkish Statistical Institute reported that Turkey's annual inflation rate increased to 15.9 percent, from 15.4 percent in June, extending the highest level since 2003. Producer price inflation climbed to 25 percent from 23.7 percent in June.
- 9 August – Late in the day, Erdoğan in a speech called upon supporters not to pay heed to "various campaigns under way against Turkey", adding: "If they have dollars, we have our people, our righteousness and our God." As these remarks reduced markets' hope that the Turkish government were willing to tighten monetary policy or begin economic reform, throughout the night and into the next morning, the lira in a dramatic fall lost almost 10 percent of its value, touching the mark of 6 lira for a US dollar.
- 14 August – Erdoğan announced a policy of boycott of US electronic products. On the same day, Turkey's banking regulator placed comprehensive limits on use of credit card instalments.
- 15 August – Qatar pledged to invest $15 billion in Turkey making lira rally by 6%.
- 16 August – The Turkish Statistical Institute reported that Turkey's industrial production declined by 2 percent in June from May, contracting for a second-straight month.
- 27 August – The Turkish Statistical Institute reported its economic confidence index dropping in August from 91.9 to 88.0, with another sharp drop in construction sector confidence leading the declines.
- 28 August – Moody's downgraded another 20 Turkish financial institutions. The ratings agency estimated that Turkey's operating environment had "deteriorated beyond its previous expectations", and predicted that this deterioration would continue.
- 29 August – Ownership of insolvent Turk Telekom transferred to "a joint venture of creditor banks." Another measure of Turkish economic confidence slid from 92.2 in July to 83.9 in August, its lowest level since March 2009. Research from consultancy Capital Economics indicated that Turkey has entered a 'steep' recession and predicted that the Turkish economy would contract by as much as 4% in the fourth quarter of 2018, before stagnating in 2019.
- 30 August – Erkan Kilimci, the deputy governor of the Turkish central bank, resigned, putting further pressure on the lira, which fell almost 5% against the dollar throughout the day.
- 3 September – Turkey's central bank announced that inflation in August had risen to nearly 18 percent, a 15-year high.
- 10 September – Data released by the Turkish Statistical Institute showed a slowdown in Turkey's economic growth in the second quarter of 2018. The country saw a 5.2 percent increase in GDP in the June quarter, compared to 7.3 percent in the first quarter of the year. Finance minister Berat Albayrak predicted that the economic slowdown would become more visible in the third quarter of 2018.
- 12 September – Erdoğan sacked the entire management staff of Turkey's sovereign wealth fund and named himself chairman of the fund. He also appointed Zafer Sonmez, formerly of Malaysia's government investment vehicle, as general manager. Erdoğan's son-in-law Berat Albayrak was named as his deputy on the board of the sovereign wealth fund.
- 13 September – Erdoğan published an executive decree requiring all contracts between two Turkish entities to be made in lira. The measure took effect immediately and requires existing contracts to be reindexed to the lira within 30 days. During a speech in Ankara, Erdoğan sharply criticized the Turkish central bank and urged the bank to cut interest rates. Instead, the central bank sharply increased its benchmark lending rate, from 17.75 percent to 24 percent, beating Reuters' predictions of a hike to 22 percent.

=== Timeline of events (2019) ===
- 3 January: Inflation data showed continued high levels, prompting concerns about economic stability.
- 31 January: The Turkish government announced new measures to stabilize the lira.
- 22 March 2019: The government restricted foreign exchange transactions ahead of local elections.
- 31 March: Local elections took place, with economic concerns influencing voter sentiment.
- 6 June 2019: President Erdoğan dismissed the central bank governor, raising fears of political interference.
- 25 June: The Turkish lira experienced sharp volatility following the dismissal.
- 25 July 2019: The new central bank governor cut interest rates significantly, aiming to boost growth.
- 12 September 2019: Inflation showed signs of decline, but economic uncertainty persisted.
- 30 December 2019: The Turkish economy showed slight recovery, but concerns remained over long-term stability.

=== Timeline of events (2021) ===
- 25 October – The sought-after expulsion of ambassadors from Canada, Denmark, France, Germany, the Netherlands, Norway, Sweden, Finland, New Zealand and the United States also caused a fall of the Turkish Lira. The expulsion was later not carried out.
- 18 November – The Central Bank of the Republic of Turkey (CBRT) cut its rate by 100 basis points to 15%, and signaled that the rates would be cut further before the end of the year. The rates had been slashed by 400 basis points since September 2021. After the rate cut decision, the lira fell to a new record low trading at 10.7738 against the dollar, reversing earlier gains.
- 22 November – Speaking after the Cabinet meeting, Erdoğan declared that a tight interest-rate policy will not lower inflation and vowed that the country will succeed in its "economic war of independence". After Erdoğan's speech, the lira went into a free fall, crashing to a record low of 13.44 to the dollar, before recovering to 12.75. Many local and international companies operating in Turkey, including Apple, halted Lira-denominated sales.
- 16-17 December - Under Erdoğan's pressure, the CBRT cut its interest rate again, by 100 basis points, despite warnings not to do so, which made lira fall by 5.6%, to 15.689 TRY to the US dollar. The next day, the BIST 100 index fell by a total of 8% during the trading day, triggering a circuit breaker on the stock exchange. The lira fell almost 7% that day, touching the 17 TRY/USD mark.
- 20 December - Erdoğan doubled down on his ultra-loose monetary policy by citing the usury doctrine (which prohibits lending with interest) and insisting that the bank would not stop cutting its interest rates, prompting another currency selloff and plunging the lira to about 17.60 to the US dollar. The currency lost 58% of the value from the beginning of the year up to that date. The lira dropped to an all-time low of 18.36 TRY to the dollar but Erdoğan stepped in, announcing measures designed to protect lira-denominated deposits and to encourage converting foreign exchange deposits to liras. The market reacted immediately, moving the Turkish currency to ca. 13.50 liras/USD, after peaking at about 12.30, in what was the widest swing in the exchange rate since 1983.
- 21 December - frenetic trading continues, with the exchange rate dropping to 11.0935 per dollar before going up to about 12.90 later in the morning and 12.50 by the afternoon. Despite lira's gains, its strength is still severely diminished since January 2021, when 7.40 liras was enough to buy a US dollar.
- 23 December - amid continued optimism related to the new economic plan and as the state banks have poured almost $7 billion during the week preceding 23 December to stabilise the currency, the USD/TRY exchange rate falls another 10% to oscillate around 11 lira to the US dollar. The lira hit 10.5343 to the dollar mark during trading, strengthening by 40% since 20 December. Investors, however, brace for more volatility as the Borsa Istanbul 100 index tumbles.

=== Timeline of events (2022) ===
- 4 July - Annual rate of inflation from June 2021 to June 2022 is reported to have reached 78.6%, with food prices doubling and transport costs increasing 123%. Since the beginning of the year, the Turkish lira has lost 20% of its value against the US dollar.

=== Timeline of events (2023) ===
- In 2023, Erdoğan began to follow orthodox banking methods. Under the guidance of Mehmet Şimşek and Hafize Gaye Erkan, the central bank began to rapidly increase interest rates. By the end of the year, the interest rate stood at 42.5%, and the annual inflation rate decreased to 53.86%.

=== Timeline of events (2024) ===
- March - The central bank increased the interest rate to 50% under Fatih Karahan, the new governor.
- 9 June - The Turkish Statistical Institute reports that the inflation rate of consumer prices rose 75.45% in May 2024, 3.37% on a monthly basis and up from 69.8% in April 2024. The steepest inflation rates were in education at 104.8%, housing at 93.2%, and hotels, cafes and restaurants at 92.9%. Capital Economics initially predicted that Turkish inflation would peak at 75%, but the higher rate of monthly inflation increase compared to both March and April made that prediction less certain.
- November - Inflation decreased to 47.09%. Interest rates kept as 50% for eight consecutive months.

== International consequences ==
The crisis has brought considerable risks of financial contagion. One aspect concerns risk to foreign lenders, where according to the Bank for International Settlements, international banks had outstanding loans of $224 billion to Turkish borrowers, including $83 billion from banks in Spain, $35 billion from banks in France, $18 billion from banks in Italy, $17 billion each from banks in the United States and in the United Kingdom, and $13 billion from banks in Germany. Another aspect concerns the situation of other emerging economies with high levels of debt denominated in USD or EUR, with respect to which Turkey may either be considered "a canary in the coalmine" or even by its crisis and the bad handling thereof increase international investors' retreat for increased perception of risk in such countries. On 31 May 2018, the Institute of Financial Research (IIF) reported that the Turkish crisis has already spread to Lebanon, Colombia and South Africa. The fall of the value of the lira has also impoverished the inhabitants in northern Syria, who use the lira for everyday transactions, and impacted the hazelnut industry hard, which is economically important in the country and produces 70% of world's hazelnuts.

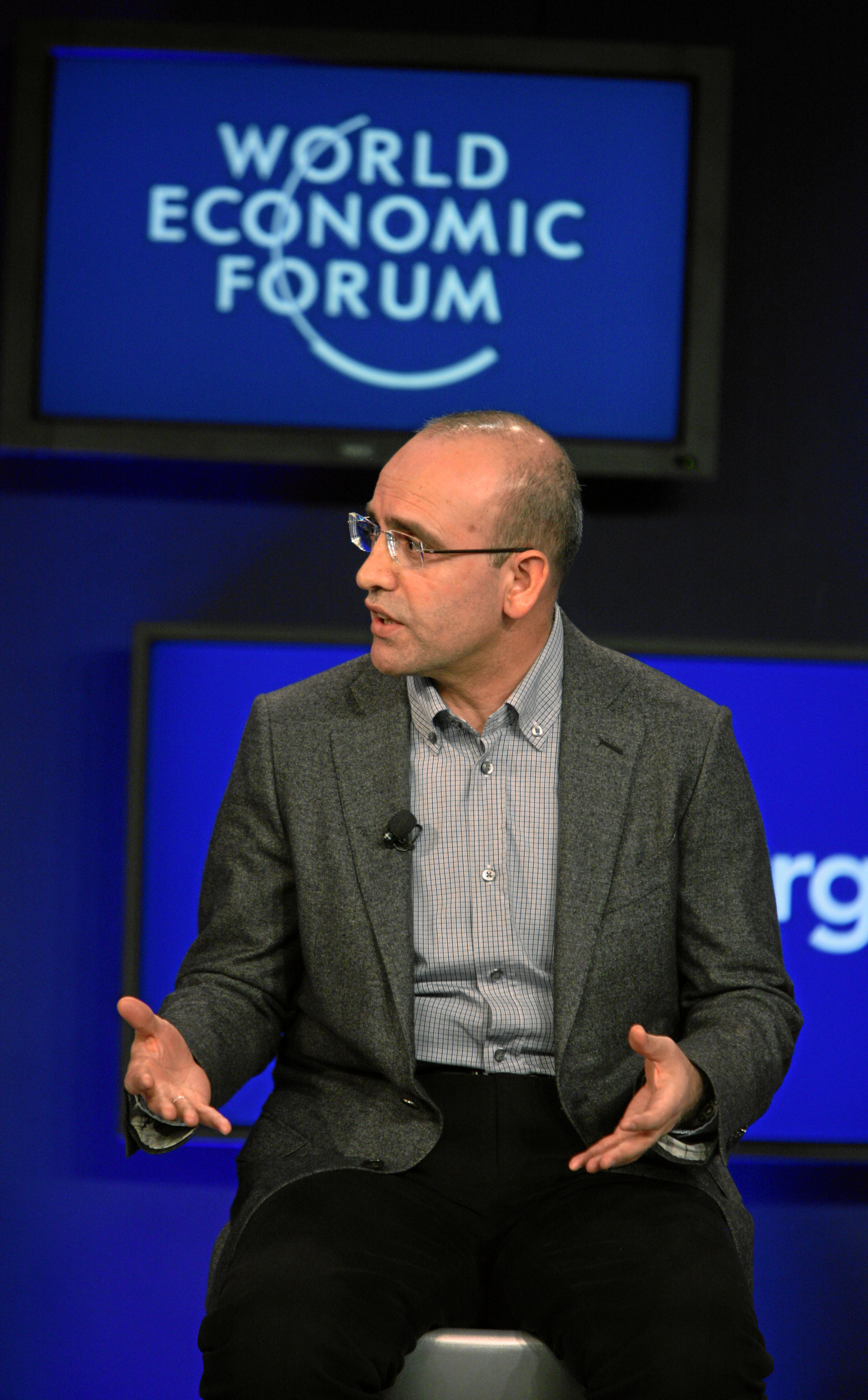
Mehmet Şimşek is credited with having tried but failed to bring back orthodoxy to Turkish interest rate policy.

=== Timeline of events (2018) ===
- 19 January – Fitch Ratings closed its Istanbul office after Erdoğan made numerous negative comments about credit rating agencies.
- 7 March – Credit ratings agency Moody's Investors Service downgraded Turkey's sovereign debt, warning of an erosion of checks and balances under Erdoğan, and saying that the Turkish military operation in Afrin, having strained ties with Washington and drawn the country deeper into the Syrian civil war, had added an extra layer of geopolitical risk.
- 1 May – Credit ratings agency Standard & Poor's cut Turkey's debt rating further into junk territory, citing widening concern about the outlook for inflation amid a sell-off in the Turkish lira currency.
- 22 May – Turkish government dollar bonds traded at prices lower than those of Senegal. On the same day, the Turkish Republic of Northern Cyprus (TRNC) government started discussing abandonment of the Turkish lira for another currency.
- 23 May – the Central Bank of the Turkish Republic of Northern Cyprus discontinues offering loans to their citizens unless their salary is paid in a foreign currency.
- 28 May – Jordan terminated its free-trade agreement with Turkey, which had lately seen Turkish exports to Jordan increase fivefold.
- 30 May – Credit ratings agency Moody's Investors Service lowered its estimate for growth of the Turkish economy in 2018 from 4 percent to 2.5 percent and in 2019 from 3.5 percent to 2 percent.
- 6 June – Bloomberg reported that Astaldi, an Italian multinational construction company, was poised to sell its stake in the flagship Yavuz Sultan Selim Bridge project for $467 million. The project had failed to meet projections, requiring Ankara to boost operators' revenue from treasury coffers, and since early 2018, the partners in the joint venture had sought restructuring of $2.3 billion of debt from creditors.
- 7 June – Credit ratings agency Moody's Investors Service downgraded the ratings of 17 Turkish banks, reasoning "that the operating environment in Turkey has deteriorated, with negative implications for the institutions' funding profile." Also on 7 June, Moody's put eleven of Turkey's top companies under review, because their credit quality was correlated in varying degrees to the government in Ankara. The firms included Koç Holding, Turkey's biggest industrial conglomerate, Doğuş Holding, which has applied to banks to restructure some of its debt, and Turkish Airlines.
- 18 June – Credit ratings agency Fitch Ratings lowered its estimate for growth of the Turkish economy in 2018 from 4.7 percent to 3.6 percent, citing reasons including an anticipated reduction in government stimulus.
- 26 June – The European Union's General Affairs Council stated that "the Council notes that Turkey has been moving further away from the European Union. Turkey's accession negotiations have therefore effectively come to a standstill and no further chapters can be stated for opening or closing and no further work towards the modernisation of the EU-Turkey Customs Union is foreseen."
- 13 July – Credit ratings agency Fitch Ratings downgraded Turkey's debt rating further into junk with negative outlook, reasoning that "economic policy credibility has deteriorated in recent months and initial policy actions following elections in June have heightened uncertainty (...) Monetary policy credibility has been damaged by comments by President Erdoğan suggesting a greater role of the presidency in setting monetary policy after the elections (...) Monetary policy has persistently been unable to bring inflation near its 5% target and inflation expectations have become unanchored. Key figures from the previous administration with reformist credentials were excluded from a new cabinet, appointed on 9 July, while the son-in-law of the president was appointed as Minister of Treasury and Finance."
- 20 July – The government of Germany lifted export credit guarantee sanctions against Turkey, which it had implemented a year earlier in order to protest the ongoing state of emergency (OHAL) in Turkey and to effect the release of German citizen Deniz Yücel and others held under arrest by the Turkish government, after the German citizens concerned were freed and the state of emergency was lifted.
- 26 July – European rating agency Scope Ratings placed Turkey's BB+ sovereign ratings on review for downgrade, citing i) "Deterioration in Turkey's economic policy and governance framework both before and in following the June election, which weigh on the effectiveness and credibility of fiscal, monetary and structural economic policy management" alongside ii) "Increasing downside risks to Turkey's macroeconomic stability stemming from external vulnerabilities."
- 27 July – At their summit in Johannesburg between 25 and 27 July, BRICS countries rejected Erdoğan's desire for Turkey to join the bloc.
- 10 August – The European Central Bank voiced increased concerns about the exposure of some of the Euro currency area's biggest lenders to Turkey – chiefly BBVA, UniCredit and BNP Paribas – in light of the lira's dramatic fall. On the same day, the US government started "a bullet a day" economic sanctions against Turkey, designed to effect the release of US citizen Andrew Brunson and 15 others, held under arrest (on charges described as a sham by U.S. officials) by the Turkish government; in a first step, US President Donald Trump announced a doubling of tariffs on Turkish steel and aluminum.
- 16 August – European rating agency Scope Ratings downgraded Turkey's sovereign ratings to BB− from BB+ and revised the Outlook to Negative, citing in the downgrade: i) "Deterioration in Turkey's economic policy predictability and credibility, in view of monetary, fiscal and structural economic policies inconsistent with the rebalancing of the economy onto a more sustainable path"; ii) "Accentuated macroeconomic imbalances"; and iii) "The impact of balance of payment weaknesses on modest levels of international reserves."
- 17 August – Credit ratings agencies Standard & Poor's and Moody's downgraded Turkey's debt rating further into junk, down to B+ (S&P) and Ba3 (Moody's). S&P predicted a recession for 2019 and inflation to peak at 22% in 2018, before subsiding to below 20% by mid-2019. Moody's said that the chances of a swift and positive resolution to Turkey's turmoil was becoming less likely thanks to the "further weakening of Turkey's public institutions and the related reduction in the predictability of Turkish policy making."

=== Timeline of events (2021) ===
- 11 September - Moody's cuts the Turkish debt rating again, downgrading it to B2 (five grades below investment level) with a negative outlook.
- 2 December - Fitch Ratings affirmed its BB− credit rating but revised the outlook to negative, citing "premature monetary policy easing cycle."
- 10 December - Standard & Poor's lowered its forecast from stable to negative, warning of a potential downgrade to Turkey's debt rating if the situation worsens.
- 14 December - Due to the unpredictability of the currency value, the Swiss-based bank UBS decided to discontinue coverage of the USD/TRY pair for its clients and retracted all prior advice for investors in the area.

== Improvements ==
On 15 August 2018, Qatar pledged to invest $15 billion in the Turkish economy making the lira rally by 6%.

On 29 November 2018, the Turkish lira hit a 4-month high in value against the US Dollar. It recovered from 7.0738 against the dollar to 5.17 on 29 November, an increase of 36.8%. Reuters also reported in a response to a poll that it expects the inflation to decrease for the November month. The reasons that were given are the positive exchanges, discounts on products and tax cuts.

== Politics and corruption ==
=== Turkish government statements of a foreign plot ===
From a background of a long history of promoting conspiracy theories by the Turkish government of Erdoğan and the AKP, with the emergence of the financial crisis, members of the government have stated that the crisis were not attributable to the government's policies, but rather were the conspiratorial work of shadowy foreign actors, seeking to harm Turkey and deprive President Erdoğan of support. During the major lira sell-off on 23 May 2018, Turkey's energy minister, Erdoğan's son-in-law Berat Albayrak, told the media that the recent sharp drop in the value of the lira was the result of the machinations of Turkey's enemies. On 30 May 2018, foreign minister Mevlüt Çavuşoğlu said that the plunge of the lira would have been caused by an organized campaign masterminded abroad, adding that the conspiracy would include both "the interest rate lobby" and "some Muslim countries", which he however refused to name. At an election campaign rally in Istanbul on 11 June 2018, Erdoğan said that the recently published 7.4 percent GDP growth figure for the January to March period would demonstrate victory against what he called "conspirators" whom he blamed for May's heavy falls of the Turkish lira. In August, Erdoğan started using the formula of "the world fighting an economic war against Turkey". Part of this idea likely had to do with a row with America regarding the case of U.S. citizen Andrew Brunson, which had a deleterious effect on Turkey-U.S. relations. Alongside sanctions on specific government figures, tariffs were also used by both countries to create economic pressure. Vox describes it as a "trade spat". Commentators such as Vox's Jen Kirby have pointed to the pivotal role Brunson's case plays in it.

A tariff on steel and other products was placed on Turkey by the United States. However, Sarah Sanders has described the American tariffs as related to "national defense", and thus not changeable by circumstances, noting that only the sanctions would be lifted upon the release of Brunson.

Erdogan describes these tariffs as an "economic war" against Turkey.

In retaliation, Turkey announced tariffs on US products, including the iPhone. The tariffs by Turkey cover products such as American cars, and coal. At a White House Press conference, Sanders described these as "regrettable". Sanders said that the Turkish economic trouble was part of a long-term trend that was not related to any actions America did.

On 22 August 2018, John R. Bolton, speaking to Reuters, said "the Turkish government made a big mistake in not releasing Pastor Brunson... [e]very day that goes by that mistake continues, this crisis could be over instantly if they did the right thing as a NATO ally, part of the West, and release pastor Brunson without condition." He went on to state that Turkey's membership in NATO was not as much of a major foreign policy issue for the US, but instead the American focus was on individuals that the United States said Turkey is holding for non-legitimate reasons. Bolton also expressed skepticism in regard to Qatar's attempts to infuse money in the Turkish economy. Erdogan spokesman Ibrahim Kalin, in a written statement, described these remarks as an admission that, contra Sanders, the American tariffs were, in fact, in relation to the Brunson case and proof that the US intended them to economically war against Turkey.

According to a poll from April 2018, 42 percent of Turks, and 59 percent of Erdoğan's governing AKP voters, saw the decline in the lira as a plot by foreign powers. In another poll from July, 36 percent of survey respondents said it the AKP government was most responsible for the depreciation of the Turkish lira, while 42 percent said it was foreign governments. This was said to be caused by the government's far-reaching control over the media via the fact that those respondents mostly reading alternative views in the Internet were more likely to see their own government responsible, at 47 percent, than foreign governments, at 34 percent.

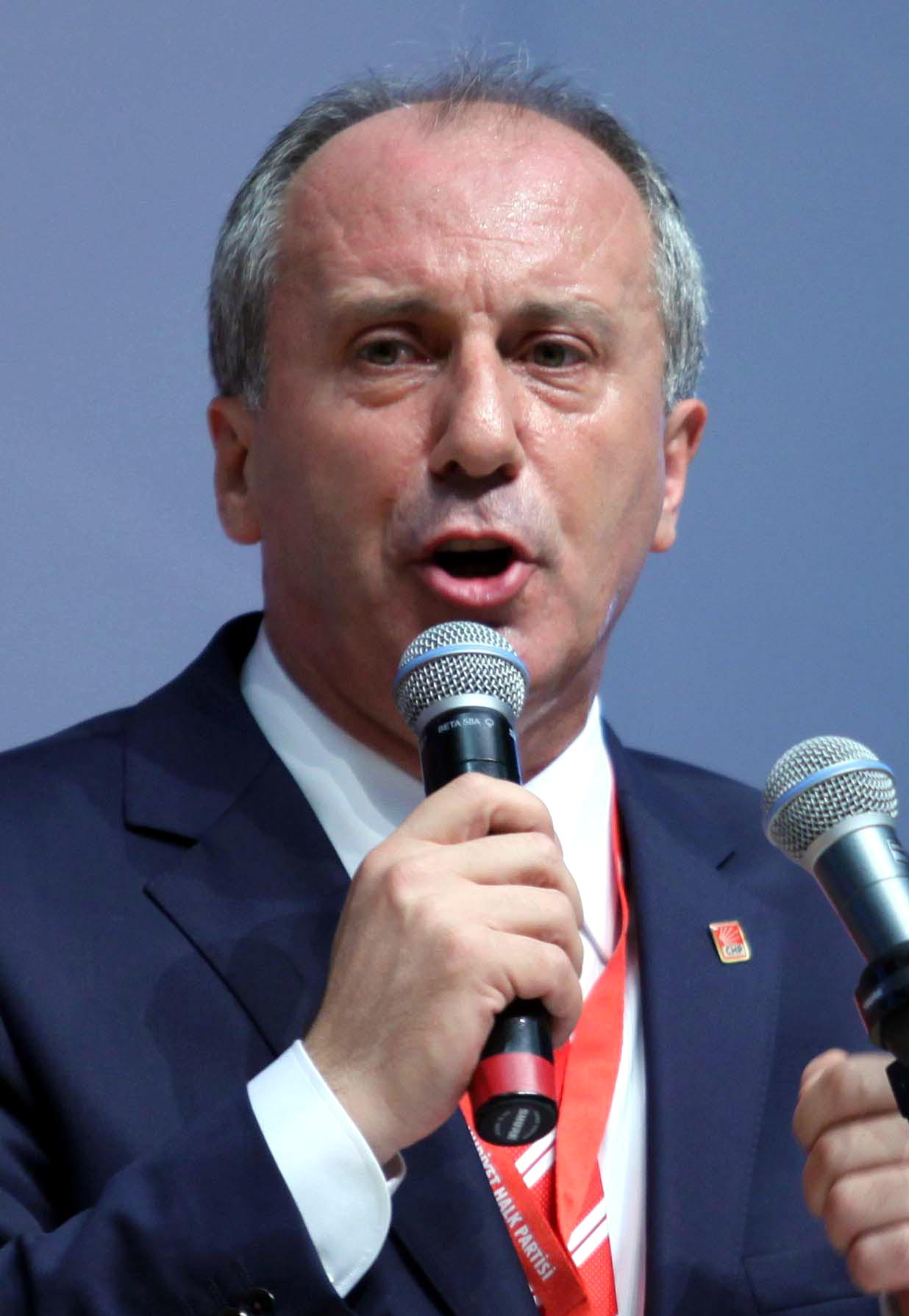
Muharrem İnce (pictured) and Meral Akşener vowed to restore integrity to economic institutions in Turkey.

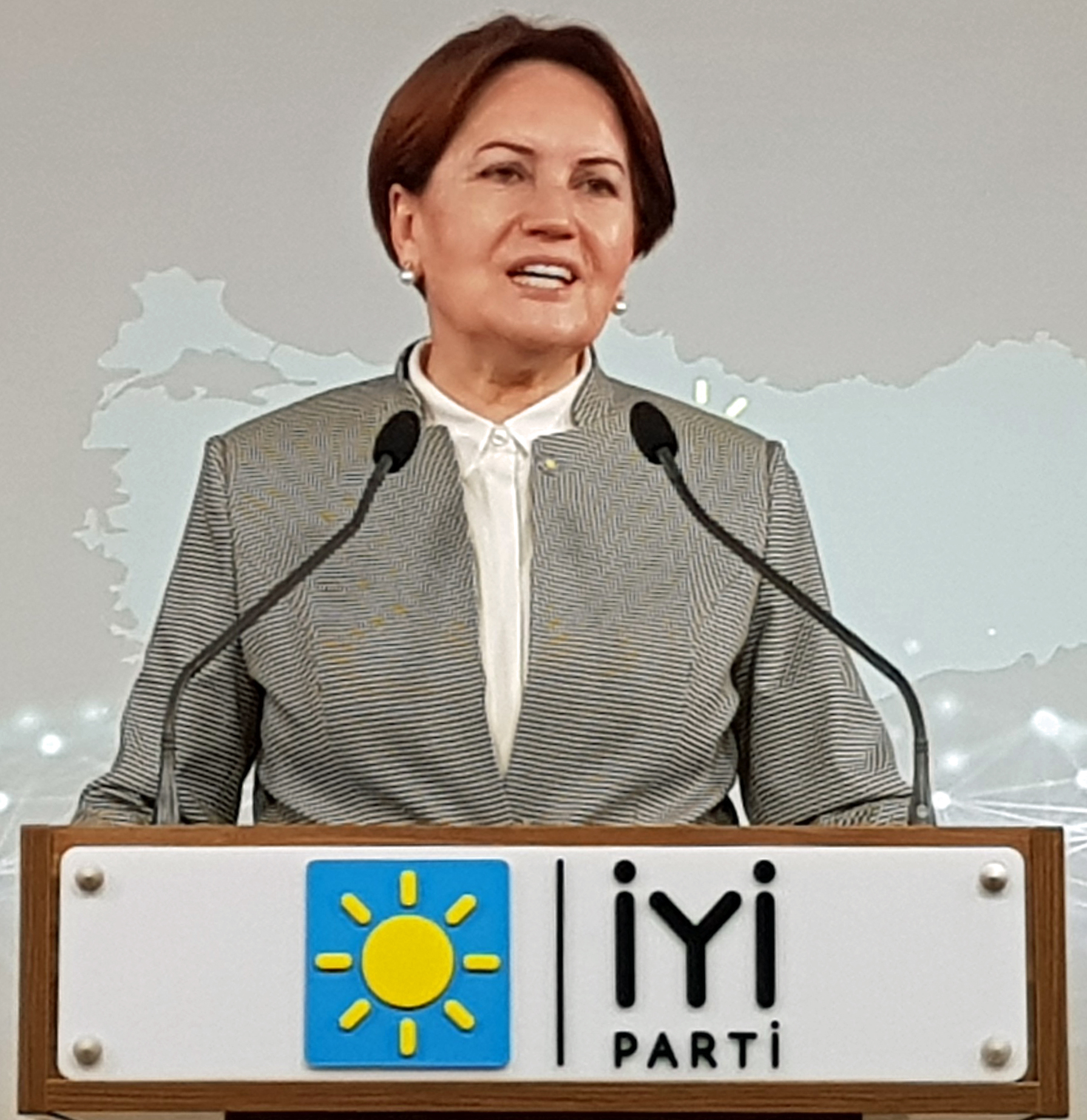
Meral Akşener, İYİ Party leader and presidential candidate, announcing her economic policies on 7 May.

=== Crisis as a topic in the June 2018 elections ===
On 16 May, a day after president Erdoğan had unsettled markets during his visit to London by suggesting he would curb the independence of the Central Bank of Turkey after the election, Republican People's Party (CHP) presidential candidate Muharrem İnce and İYİ Party presidential candidate Meral Akşener both vowed to ensure the independence of the central bank if elected.

In a 26 May interview on his campaign trail, CHP presidential candidate Muharrem İnce said on economic policy that "the central bank can only halt the lira's slide temporarily by raising interest rates, because it's not the case that depreciation fundamentally stems from interest rates being too high or too low. So, the central bank will intervene, but the things that really need to be done are in the political and legal areas. Turkey needs to immediately be extricated from a political situation that breeds economic uncertainty, and its economy must be handled by independent and autonomous institutions. My economic team is ready, and we have been working together for a long time."

In a nationwide survey conducted between 13 and 20 May, 45 percent saw the economy (including the steadily-dropping lira and unemployment) as the greatest challenge facing Turkey, with foreign policy at 18 percent, the justice system at 7 percent and terror and security at 5 percent.

İYİ Party presidential candidate Meral Akşener, supported by a strong economic team led by former Central Bank Governor Durmuş Yılmaz, had on 7 May presented her party's economic program, saying that "we will purchase the debts from consumer loans, credit card and overdraft accounts of 4.5 million citizens whose debts are under legal supervision of banks or consumer financing companies and whose debts have been sold to collection companies as of 30 April 2018. It is our duty to help our citizens with this condition, as the state has helped big companies in difficult situations."

On 13 June, CHP leader Kemal Kılıçdaroğlu reiterated the opposition's view that the state of emergency in place since July 2016 were an impediment to Turkey's currency, investment and economy, vowing that it be lifted within 48 hours in case of an opposition victory in the elections. İYİ Party leader and presidential candidate Akşener had made the same vow on 18 May, while CHP presidential candidate İnce had said on 30 May: "Foreign countries do not trust Turkey, thus they do not invest in our country. When Turkey becomes a country of the rule law, foreign investors will invest thus the lira will gain value." Early June, President Recep Tayyip Erdoğan had suggested in an interview that the issue of lifting the emergency rule would be discussed the elections, however asked back: "What's wrong with the state of emergency?"

=== Statements of corruption and insider trading ===
In early April 2017, Peoples' Democratic Party (HDP) presidential candidate Selahattin Demirtaş, writing in a letter from prison—where he had been held without conviction since 2016 on charges of inciting violence with words— saying that "the biggest problem for the youth in Turkey is corruption which has accompanied AKP governance."

In late May 2018, Republican People's Party (CHP) deputy chair Aykut Erdoğdu called on the Financial Crimes Investigation Board of Turkey (MASAK) to investigate exchange rate transactions made amid rapid decline and partial recovery in the value of the lira on 23 May, saying there was insider trading by market participants who knew of the 300 basis points interest rate hike by the Turkish central bank in advance.

In early July 2018, Turkey's Capital Markets Board (SPK) announced that, until the end of August, share purchases on the Borsa Istanbul by people party to the relevant company's internal information, or by those close to them (insider trading), would not be subject to a stock market abuse directive. Amid a public outcry, it suspended the directive some days later, without giving a reason for the move.

== See also ==
- 2001 Turkish economic crisis
- 2021–2023 inflation surge
- Economic impact of the COVID-19 pandemic
- Economic impact of the Russian invasion of Ukraine
- 2018–present Argentine monetary crisis
- 2014 Brazilian economic crisis
