= Murat Uysal =

Turkish economist

Governor of the Central Bank of Turkey
- In office 6 July 2019 – 7 November 2020
- Preceded by: Murat Çetinkaya
- Succeeded by: Naci Ağbal

Personal details
- Born: 1971 (age 54–55) Istanbul, Turkey
- Education: Galatasaray High School; Istanbul University (BS); Marmara University (MS)
- Occupation: Banker

Murat Uysal is a Turkish economist and public administrator who served as the governor of the Central Bank of the Republic of Turkey (CBRT). He assumed office on July 6, 2019, succeeding Murat Çetinkaya, and served until November 7, 2020.

== Early life and education ==
Uysal graduated from Istanbul University Faculty of Economics with a degree in Economics following his education at Galatasaray High School. He completed his master's degree in the Department of Banking at Marmara University Institute of Banking and Insurance, focusing on Inflation Targeting and its Applications in the World and Turkey.

== Career ==
Uysal began his professional career in the banking sector in 1998. He held various positions as an expert and manager responsible for Foreign Exchange and Money Markets, as well as Securities. From 2007 to 2011, he served as the Head of the Department of Money and Capital Markets at Halkbank. Between November 2011 and June 2016, he assumed the role of Deputy General Manager responsible for Treasury Management at the same institution. Concurrently, he held positions such as board member of Halk Yatırım A.Ş. from 2008 to 2010, board member of Halk Portföy A.Ş. in 2011, and chairman of the Board of Directors of Halk Portföy A.Ş. from 2012 to 2014. From March 2015 to June 2016, he served as the chairman of the Board of Directors of Halk Yatırım Menkul Değerler A.Ş.

Prior to his appointment as governor, Uysal served as deputy governor of the CBRT and played a significant role in the formulation and implementation of monetary policies aimed at maintaining price stability and supporting economic growth in Turkey.

During his tenure as governor, Uysal faced various challenges, including high inflation, currency fluctuations, and external economic pressures. He implemented monetary policy measures to address these challenges, including interest rate adjustments and liquidity management.

Uysal's leadership at the CBRT was marked by efforts to enhance communication with market participants, improve transparency, and strengthen the credibility of monetary policy decisions. He emphasized the importance of central bank independence and accountability in achieving macroeconomic stability and financial resilience.

In November 2020, Uysal was removed from his position as governor of the CBRT by presidential decree, and he was succeeded by Naci Ağbal. His tenure as governor was notable for its emphasis on navigating Turkey's economic challenges and maintaining stability in the face of domestic and global uncertainties.
