= List of governors of the Central Bank of the Republic of Turkey =

The following is a list of governors of the Central Bank of the Republic of Turkey.

From its foundation until January 26, 1970, the heads of the Central Bank were in the status of General Director. Thereafter the title was changed to Governor.

#	Name	Took office	Left office
General Directors
1	Selahattin Çam	June 9, 1931	March 21, 1938
2	Kemal Zaim Sunel	March 21, 1938	March 9, 1949
3	Mustafa Sadi Bekter	March 31, 1949	October 4, 1950
4	Osman Nuri Göver	April 13, 1951	May 28, 1953
5	Mustafa Nail Gidel	July 20, 1953	June 16, 1960
6	Memduh Aytür	July 21, 1960	November 7, 1960
7	İbrahim Münir Mostar	November 23, 1960	August 28, 1962
8	Ziyaettin Kayla	June 28, 1963	January 13, 1966
9	Naim Talu	July 14, 1967	December 11, 1971
Governors
10	Memduh Güpgüpoğlu	July 25, 1972	January 9, 1975
11	Cafer Tayyar Sadıklar	June 26, 1976	September 18, 1978
12	İsmail Hakkı Aydınoğlu	October 21, 1978	January 10, 1981
13	Osman Şıklar	January 12, 1981	January 4, 1984
14	Yavuz Canevi	January 15, 1984	November 11, 1986
15	Rüşdü Saracoğlu	July 23, 1987	August 2, 1993
16	Nihat Bülent Gültekin	September 9, 1993	January 31, 1994
17	Şakir Yaman Törüner	February 14, 1994	November 1, 1995
18	Süleyman Gazi Erçel	April 10, 1996	March 1, 2001
19	Süreyya Serdengeçti	March 14, 2001	March 14, 2006
20	Durmuş Yılmaz	April 18, 2006	April 13, 2011
21	Erdem Başçı	April 14, 2011	April 19, 2016
22	Murat Çetinkaya	April 19, 2016	July 5, 2019
23	Murat Uysal	July 6, 2019	November 7, 2020
24	Naci Ağbal	November 7, 2020	March 20, 2021
25	Şahap Kavcıoğlu	March 20, 2021	June 8, 2023
26	Hafize Gaye Erkan	June 8, 2023	February 2, 2024
27	Fatih Karahan	February 2, 2024	
