= Gazi Erçel =

Turkish economist and central banker (1945–2022)

Governor of the Central Bank of Turkey
- In office April 10, 1996 – March 1, 2001
- Preceded by: Yaman Törüner
- Succeeded by: Süreyya Serdengeçti

Personal details
- Born: Süleyman Gazi Erçel; February 20, 1945 Istanbul, Turkey
- Died: June 13, 2022 (aged 77)
- Education: Ankara University (BA); Vanderbilt University (MA)
- Occupation: Central banker, business executive, academician

Süleyman Gazi Erçel (February 20, 1945 – June 13, 2022) was a Turkish economist who served as 18th Governor of the Central Bank of the Republic of Turkey (1996-2001). He previously served as Director General of the Ministry of Treasury and Finance of Turkey as well as chairman of Tütünbank.

== Early life and education ==
Erçel was born on February 20, 1945 in Istanbul, Turkey. He earned his bachelor's degree from the Department of Finance and Economics of Ankara University in 1967 and his master's degree from Vanderbilt University in 1976.

== Career ==
Erçel began his career in 1967 at the Turkish Ministry of Treasury and Finance where he held several roles, including Deputy Director General of the Treasury, as well as various roles in the economic research, banking and foreign exchange, IMF, and World Bank departments.

From 1982 to 1986, Erçel left the ministry to serve as Deputy Executive Director of the IMF. He returned in 1987 upon appointment as Director General of the Treasury.

In 1989, Erçel left civil service to pursue a career in the private sector. He was a board member at Yaşar Holding as well as Tütünbank, where he became chairman in 1994.

Erçel was appointed governor of the Central Bank of the Republic of Turkey in 1996 by the cabinet of Turkish President Süleyman Demirel. Three weeks into his term, Erçel addressed the Institute of International Finance in Istanbul, remarking that his two primary goals as governor would be to reduce inflation and to prepare the Turkish economy for entry into the EU Customs Union.

In December 1999, Erçel announced an IMF-backed disinflation program with a three-year horizon, aimed at tackling an inflated consumer price index, lowering real interest rates, and redistributing resources throughout the Turkish economy. In 2000, Erçel secured $7.5 billion in loans from the IMF to help replenish the central bank's reserves after growing government deficits led to a liquidity shortage. In response to the 2001 Turkish economic crisis, Erçel resigned as governor on moral grounds, asserting that Turkey needed a reconstituted negotiating team to establish a new IMF agreement.

After leaving the Central Bank of Turkey, Erçel became a financial columnist for several Turkish newspapers and served as a lecturer on the Faculty of Economics and Administrative Sciences at Istanbul Aydın University. He died at home on June 13, 2022 at the age of 77.

Government offices
Preceded by Yaman Törüner	Governor of the Central Bank of Turkey; April 10, 1996 – March 1, 2001	Succeeded by Süreyya Serdengeçti
