= List of ambassadors of Turkey to OECD =

The list of ambassadors of Turkey to OECD includes diplomats responsible for representing Turkey within the Organisation for Economic Co-operation and Development (OECD).

Turkey's Permanent Mission to the OECD has been operational since 1961, following its earlier representation to the OEEC. Since 1982, the Permanent Mission has been based at "9 Rue Alfred Dehodencq, 75016, Paris." The Mission includes personnel from the Ministry of Foreign Affairs, the Ministry of Treasury and Finance, the Ministry of Trade, the Ministry of Energy and Natural Resources and the Central Bank of the Republic of Turkey.

== List of ambassadors ==
#	Ambassador	Term start	Term end	Ref.
1	Mehmet Ali Tiney	1 January 1952	1 January 1961	
2	Prof. Aziz Köklü	1 January 1961	1 January 1962	
3	Münir Mostar	1 January 1962	1 January 1964	
4	Cahit Kayra	1 January 1965	1 January 1968	
5	Metin Kızılkaya	1 January 1968	1 January 1970	
6	Kamuran Gürün	1 January 1970	1 January 1972	
7	Memduh Aytür	1 January 1972	1 January 1981	
8	Pertev Subaşı	1 January 1981	1 January 1983	
9	Tanşuğ Bleda	1 January 1983	1 January 1988	
10	Mustafa Aşula	1 January 1988	1 January 1990	
11	Temel İskit	1 January 1990	1 January 1994	
12	Prof. Dr. Orhan Güvenen	1 January 1994	1 January 1997	
13	Dr. Akın Alptuna	1 January 1997	1 January 2000	
14	Uluç Özülker	1 January 2000	1 January 2002	
15	Sencer Özsoy	1 January 2002	1 January 2006	
16	Ahmet Kamil Erozan	1 December 2006	1 November 2011	
17	Kadri Ecvet Tezcan	5 January 2012	15 November 2013	
18	Mithat Rende	12 November 2013	1 March 2016	
19	Erdem Başçı	26 May 2016	10 March 2021	
20	Kerem Alkin	15 March 2021	18 October 2024	
21	Esen Altuğ	1 November 2024	Present	

== See also ==
- Organisation for Economic Co-operation and Development
- Ministry of Foreign Affairs
- List of diplomatic missions of Turkey
- Ministry of Treasury and Finance
- Ministry of Trade
- Ministry of Energy and Natural Resources
- Central Bank of the Republic of Turkey
