= TCMB =

TCMB may refer to:

- Central Bank of the Republic of Turkey (Turkish: Türkiye Cumhuriyet Merkez Bankası, TCMB)
- Turner Classic Movies, an American movie-oriented pay-TV network
