= Durmuş Yılmaz =

Turkish politician

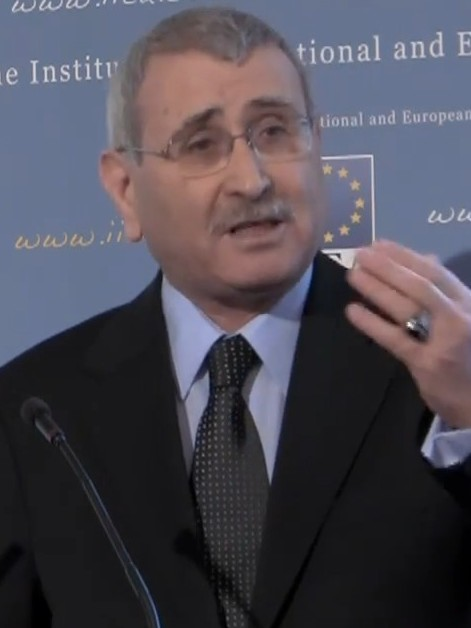

Speaker of the Grand National Assembly Interim
- In office 7 July 2018 – 12 July 2018
- President: Recep Tayyip Erdoğan
- Preceded by: İsmail Kahraman
- Succeeded by: Binali Yıldırım

Member of the Grand National Assembly
- In office 8 July 2018 – 3 June 2023
- Constituency: Ankara (III) (2018)
- In office 7 June 2015 – 1 November 2015
- Constituency: Uşak (June 2015)

Governor of the Central Bank of Turkey
- In office 18 April 2006 – 18 April 2011
- Preceded by: Süreyya Serdengeçti
- Succeeded by: Erdem Başçı

Personal details
- Born: 1947 (age 78–79) Uşak, Turkey
- Party: Nationalist Movement Party (MHP) (until 2017); Good Party (İYİ) (2017–present)
- Education: Cass Business School (BA); University College London (MA)
- Occupation: Civil servant
- Profession: Economist

Durmuş Yılmaz is a Turkish economist, politician and was the Governor of the Central Bank of the Republic of Turkey between 2006 and 2011.

== Biography ==
Born in the western Anatolian city of Uşak in 1947, Yılmaz obtained a B.A. degree in economics at City University London and received his M.A. degree from the University College London.

Yılmaz joined the Central Bank of Turkey in 1980 and started to work in the Foreign Debt Rescheduling Division. Then he served in the area of Exchange Rates and Reserve Management. He was promoted to the post of Deputy Director of Foreign Exchange Transactions Division in 1993, Director of Interbank Money Market Division in 1995, and Director of Balance of Payments Division in 1996. Yılmaz became Deputy Executive Director at Markets Department in 1996 and was responsible for the Foreign Exchange Risk Management, Credits, Foreign Exchange and FX Banknotes Markets and Open Market Operations. He was appointed Executive Director of the Workers’ Remittances (Non-Resident FX Deposits) Department in 2002. Yılmaz became a Member of the Board on May 1, 2003, and re-elected to this position by April 2006.

Durmuş Yılmaz was appointed Governor of the Central Bank of the Republic of Turkey on April 18, 2006 following the approval of President Ahmet Necdet Sezer. One month before, Sezer rejected the government's first candidate for the post, Adnan Buyukdeniz, chief executive of AlBaraka Turk, an interest-free financial institution founded with Arab capital. The post of governorship was held by Erdem Başçı, an interim governor since March 14, 2006 when the widely respected Süreyya Serdengeçti retired at the end of a five-year term that saw chronic inflation drop from double- to single-digit figures for the first time in three decades under a tight program backed by the International Monetary Fund.

== Political career ==
Yılmaz was elected to parliament representing Uşak in the June 2015 general election, as a politician from the Nationalist Movement Party. He lost his seat in the November snap election. After his loss Yılmaz helped found the Good Party and was elected to Ankara's third electoral district in the 2018 elections.

Government offices
Preceded by Süreyya Serdengeçti	Governor of the Central Bank of Turkey; April 18, 2006–April 18, 2011	Succeeded by Erdem Başçı
