= Süreyya Serdengeçti =

Turkish economist (1952–2025)

Governor of the Central Bank of Turkey
- In office 14 March 2001 – 13 March 2006
- Preceded by: Süleyman Gazi Erçel
- Succeeded by: Durmuş Yılmaz

Personal details
- Born: Necip Süreyya Serdengeçti; 7 April 1952 Istanbul, Turkey
- Died: 26 July 2025 (aged 73)
- Spouse: Çiğdem Serdengeçti (m. 1981)
- Children: 1
- Education: Galatasaray High School
- Alma mater: Middle East Technical University (BA); Vanderbilt University (MA)
- Occupation: Civil servant, academician
- Profession: Economist

Necip Süreyya Serdengeçti (7 April 1952 – 26 July 2025) was a Turkish economist and onetime Governor of the Central Bank of Turkey. Before his death in July 2025, he was working as a lecturer in economics at the TOBB University of Economics and Technology in Ankara, Turkey.

== Early life ==
Serdengeçti was born on 7 April 1952 in Istanbul, Turkey. After attending the Galatasaray High School in Istanbul, he studied economics at the Middle East Technical University in Ankara and earned his BS degree in 1979. From 1984 to 1986, he attended The Graduate Program in Economic Development at (GPED) at Vanderbilt University in Nashville, Tennessee, US and received a master's degree in economics.

== Career ==
Serdengeçti entered the Central Bank of Turkey in 1980 and worked first in the Exchange Department's Debt Relief division, then the Foreign Exchange Transactions division. After returning from the US, he served as the manager of the Foreign Exchange Transactions and from 1992 onward as the Open Market Operations manager. In 1994, he was appointed the press spokesman of the Central Bank and also as assistant general secretary. Later that year he moved to the Foreign Relations department, being responsible for balance of payments and international institutions. Serdengeçti was appointed to the post of general manager for the Markets department in 1996, covering the fields of international reserve management, foreign exchange interventions, interbank money market, open-market operations and treasury auctions. In 1998 he was promoted to the post of vice-governor in charge of operations and statistics.

Serdengeçti was appointed the 20th Governor of the Central Bank by the coalition government on 14 March 2001, succeeding Gazi Erçel, who had resigned. The Turkish government announced an economic program on 14 April 2001, called the Derviş program, Kemal Derviş being then the Minister of State responsible for the economy, and the parliament amended the central bank law on 25 April 2001 and gave autonomy to the Central Bank of Turkey. These steps and a new monetary policy enabled Serdengeçti to better deal with chronic instability issues in the Turkish economy. During his five years of governorship, the US dollar exchange rate fell from 1.60 to 1.30 Turkish Lira, the annual inflation rate from 37.51% to 8.15% and the overnight interest rate from 120% to 13.5%. On 1 January 2005 the Turkish currency Lira was converted into New Turkish Lira by dropping six zeros.

Serdengeçti's official term ended on 14 March 2006. He joined the TOBB Economics and Technology University's Economics department as a senior lecturer where he worked until his death on 26 July 2025, at the age of 73.

== Sources ==
- Central Bank of Turkey – Biography of Süreyya Serdengeçti

Government offices
| Preceded by Gazi Erçel | Governor of the Central Bank of Turkey; 14 March 2001 – 13 March 2006 | Succeeded by Durmuş Yılmaz |
