= Murat Çetinkaya =

Turkish economist

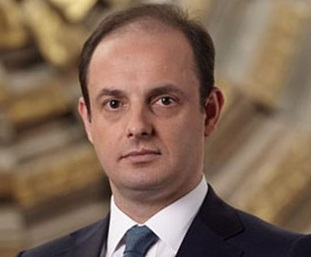
- Murat Çetinkaya in 2016

Governor of the Central Bank of Turkey
- In office 19 April 2016 – 5 July 2019
- Preceded by: Erdem Başçı
- Succeeded by: Murat Uysal

Personal details
- Born: 1976 (age 49–50) Çorlu, Tekirdağ, Turkey
- Education: Boğaziçi University (BA, PhD)
- Occupation: Civil servant

Murat Çetinkaya (born 1976, Tekirdağ) served as the governor of Central Bank of the Republic of Turkey (CBRT) between 2016 and 2019. He had been a member of top-level economic policy-making platforms in Turkey, such as Economic Policies Coordination Council, Financial Stability Committee. He was the official representative of Turkey in G-20. He contributed to the works of Financial Stability Board (FSB) and Bank for International Settlements (BIS). He had been co-chair for Financial Stability Board MENA Regional Consultative Group.

== Early life ==
He was born in Çorlu, Tekirdağ in 1976. Çetinkaya studied political science and international relations, with a double major in sociology, at Boğaziçi University. He had his PhD degree in the same university in international political economy.

== Career ==
Prior to his appointment as governor, Çetinkaya was deputy governor in CBRT between 2012 and 2016. He had been a member of Monetary Policy Committee. He was responsible for financial stability, macroprudential policy-making and market operations. He also headed the risk committee. He represented CBRT in several international working groups and committees such as FSB Assessment of Vulnerabilities Working Group and BIS Emerging Markets Group.

Before joining CBRT, Çetinkaya served in banking industry. He started his career in 1998 at Albaraka Turkish Participation Bank and then he joined Halkbank. in 2003. He became executive vice president responsible for international banking and investor relations. During this term, he had been a board member for Halk Yatırım Menkul Değerler A.S. He then served as executive vice president in Kuwait Turkish Participation Bank from 2008 to 2012.

Government offices
Preceded by Erdem Başçı	Governor of the Central Bank of Turkey; 19 April 2016 – 5 July 2019	Succeeded by Murat Uysal
