= Erdem Başçı =

Turkish economist and bank governor

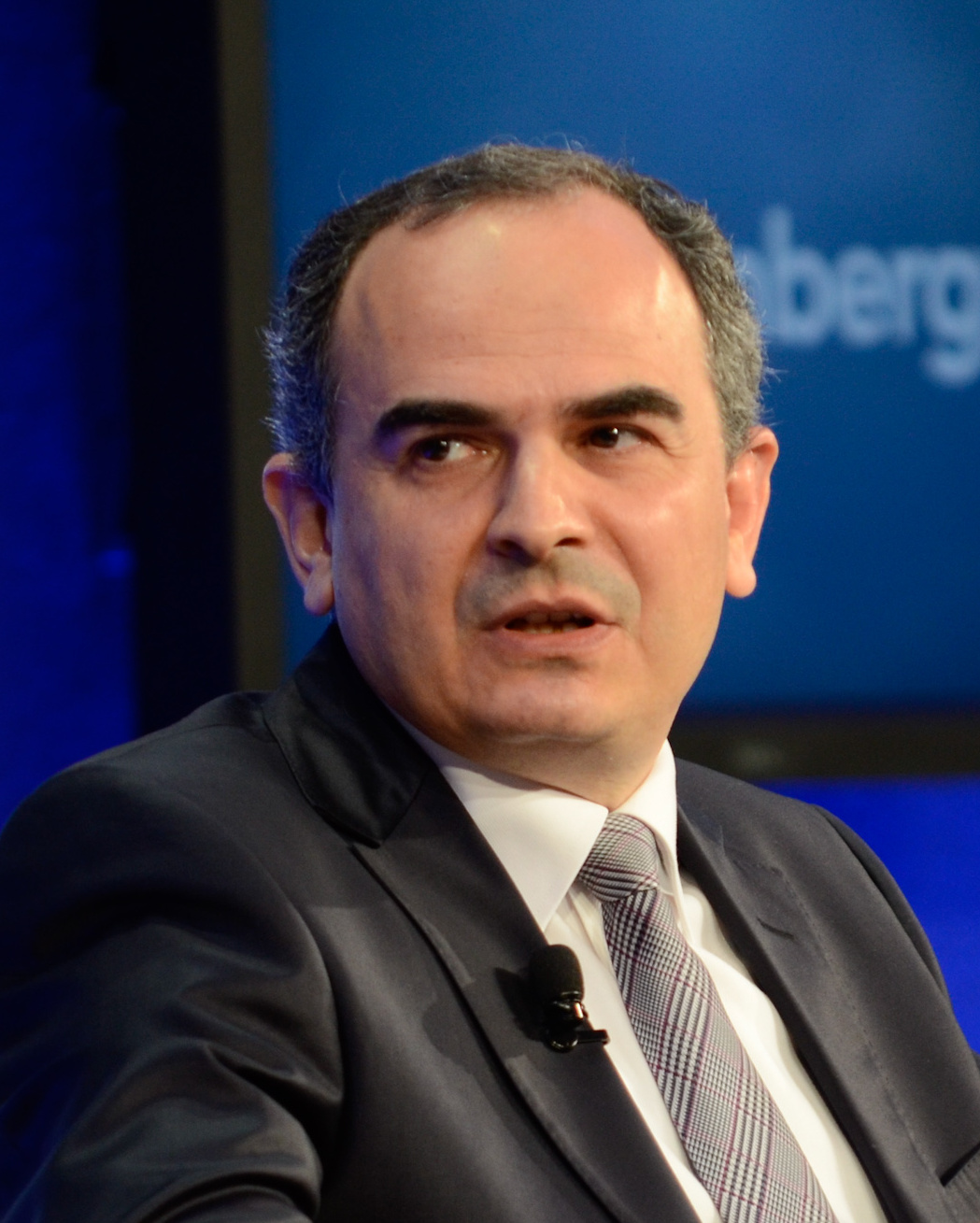
- Başçı at the World Economic Forum on the Middle East, North Africa and Eurasia in 2012

Governor of the Central Bank of Turkey
- In office 19 April 2011 – 19 April 2016
- Preceded by: Durmuş Yılmaz
- Succeeded by: Murat Çetinkaya

Personal details
- Born: 1966 (age 59–60) Ankara, Turkey
- Education: TED Ankara College
- Alma mater: Middle East Technical University (BS); Johns Hopkins University (MA); Bilkent University (MA, PhD)
- Occupation: Academic, civil servant
- Profession: Economist

Erdem Başçı (born 1966) is a Turkish economist and the former Governor of the Central Bank of the Republic of Turkey in the 2010s.

== Early life ==
He was born in 1966 in Ankara. After finishing high school at TED Ankara College in 1983, Erdem Başçı was educated in electrical engineering at the Middle East Technical University (ODTÜ), and graduated in 1987 with a bachelor's degree. He received master's degrees in 1989 in business administration, and in 1990 in economics from Bilkent University, and in 1993 in economics from the Johns Hopkins University. In 1995, Erdem Başçı earned a PhD degree in economics from Bilkent University.

He served between 1995 and 2003 as a member of the teaching staff at the Bilkent University, from 1999 on as an associate professor of economics.

== Career ==
Başçı was appointed deputy governor of the Central Bank of Turkey on 9 October 2003. He was reconfirmed at this post on 10 October 2008. Erdem Başçı was appointed governor on 14 April 2011, succeeding Durmuş Yılmaz.

After ending his official five-year term, Başçı was succeeded on 19 April 2016 by his deputy Murat Çetinkaya.

Government offices
| Preceded by Durmuş Yılmaz | Governor of the Central Bank of Turkey; 19 April 2011 – 19 April 2016 | Succeeded by Murat Çetinkaya |
