= Dilek Akagün Yılmaz =

Turkish politician

Member of the Grand National Assembly
- In office 28 June 2011 – 23 June 2015
- Constituency: Uşak (2011)

Personal details
- Born: Dilek Akagün; 1963 (age 62–63) Külköy, Karahallı, Uşak Province, Turkey
- Party: Republican People's Party (CHP)
- Children: 2
- Education: Dokuz Eylül University
- Occupation: Politician, attorney
- Religion: Islam

Dilek Akagün Yılmaz (born 11 February 1963) is a Turkish politician and lawyer who served as a member of the Grand National Assembly of Turkey for Uşak from 2011 to 2015. A member of the Republican People's Party (CHP), she was elected to the 24th Parliament of Turkey in the 2011 Turkish general election. Before entering parliament, she worked as an attorney and served on the Uşak Municipal Council following the 1989 Turkish local elections.

== Life ==
Dilek Akagün was born to Ali and Ümmü in Külköy village of Karahallı district in Uşak Province, Turkey in 1963.

She completed her primary, middle and secondary education in Uşak before enrolling at the Faculty of Law of Dokuz Eylül University in İzmir. She graduated in 1984.

In 1984, after completing the School of Law of the Dokuz Eylül University in İzmir, she began working as an attorney in Uşak. She is the charter member of the Uşak branch of Human Rights Association. She is also a member of Atatürkçü Düşünce Derneği (Atatürkist Thought Association) and the Çağdaş Yaşamı Destekleme Derneği (Association for the Support of Contemporary Living). She is married to Fuat Yılmaz, and the mother of two.

In addition to her work as a practising lawyer, she served on the executive board of the Uşak Bar Association. Her professional and civic activities also included involvement in human rights organizations in Uşak.

== Politics ==
In 1988, she joined the Social Democratic Populist Party (SHP). In the local elections held on 26 March 1989, she was elected to the municipal council of Uşak. She ran for parliament and in the general election held on 12 June 2011, she was elected to the 24th Parliament of Turkey. In 2013, she was referred to the CHP parliamentary disciplinary committee following remarks she made about party deputy chair Sezgin Tanrıkulu. She ran for a second term in 2015, however she placed fourth in preselection denying her a place on the party list in Uşak.

During her involvement in local politics, Yılmaz served on the CHP's provincial executive board and disciplinary committee in Uşak. Between 1998 and 2001, she was chair of the party's central district organization in Uşak, before being elected to the Grand National Assembly in 2011.

During her parliamentary term, Yılmaz also addressed issues concerning judicial proceedings and the rights of defendants in several high-profile cases. In September 2014, she held a press conference at the Grand National Assembly alongside relatives of military personnel detained in connection with the Istanbul military espionage case and the Malatya Zirve Publishing House case. She called for the Constitutional Court to examine individual applications concerning the military espionage case.

In December 2014, Yılmaz held another parliamentary press conference concerning the arrest of former member of parliament Fevzi İşbaşaran over social media posts. She questioned the detention decision, citing a digital forensic report which, according to her account, indicated that the posts had not originated from İşbaşaran's official account.
