= Rüşdü Saracoğlu =

Turkish economist and politician (1948–2025)

Governor of the Central Bank of the Republic of Turkey
- In office 23 July 1987 – 2 August 1993
- Preceded by: Yavuz Canevi
- Succeeded by: Nihat Bülent Gültekin

Member of the Grand National Assembly
- In office 8 January 1996 – 18 April 1999
- Constituency: İzmir (1995)

Personal details
- Born: 18 April 1948 Ankara, Turkey
- Died: 23 May 2025 (aged 77)
- Political party: ANAP
- Relations: Şükrü Saracoğlu (grandfather)
- Education: Ankara Atatürk High School
- Alma mater: Middle East Technical University (BS); University of Minnesota (PhD)
- Occupation: Economist
- Institutions: University of Minnesota; Boston College; IMF; Koç Holding

Rüşdü Saracoğlu (18 April 1948 – 23 May 2025) was a Turkish economist and politician. A member of the Motherland Party, he served as Governor of the Central Bank of the Republic of Turkey from 1987 to 1993 and was a member of the Grand National Assembly from 1996 to 1999.

Saracoğlu was the grandson of former Prime Minister of Turkey Şükrü Saraçoğlu. He died on 23 May 2025, at the age of 77.
