= Uşak (electoral district) =

Electoral district for the Grand National Assembly of Turkey

Coordinates: 38°30′N 29°25′E

- electoral district for the Grand National Assembly of Turkey
- Uşak shown within Turkey
- Province: Uşak
- Electorate: 248,746

Current electoral district
- Created: 1923
- Seats: 3 Historical: 4 (1954-1960)
- MPs: List: İsmail Güneş Ak Parti Mehmet Altay Ak Parti Dilek Akagün Yılmaz CHP
- Turnout at last election: 91.55%
- Representation
- AK Party: 2 / 3
- CHP: 1 / 3

Uşak is an electoral district of the Grand National Assembly of Turkey. It elects 3 members of parliament (deputies) to represent the province of the same name for a four-year term by the D'Hondt method, a party-list proportional representation system.

== Members ==
A population review of every electoral district is conducted before each general election, which can lead to certain districts being granted a smaller or greater number of parliamentary seats. Tunceli has elected two members of parliament since 1961; previously, it elected three.

There are currently three sitting members of parliament representing Uşak: two from the governing Justice and Development Party (AK Party) and one from the main opposition Republican People's Party (CHP).

MPs for Uşak, 1999 onwards
Seat	1999 (21st parliament)	2002 (22nd parliament)	2007 (23rd parliament)	2011 (24th parliament)	June 2015 (25th parliament)	November 2015 (26th parliament)	2018 (27th parliament)
MP	Armağan Yılmaz; MHP	Ahmet Çağlayan; AK Party	Mustafa Çetin; AK Party	Mehmet Altay; AK Party			
MP	Hasan Özgöbek; DSP	Alim Tunç; AK Party	Nuri Uslu; AK Party	İsmail Güneş; AK Party	Durmuş Yılmaz; MHP	Alim Tunç; AK Party	İsmail Güneş; AK Party
MP	Mehmet Yaşar Ünal; DSP	Osman Coşkunoğlu; CHP		Dilek Akagün Yılmaz; CHP	Özkan Yalim; CHP		

== General elections ==
=== 2011 ===
2011 Turkish general election: Uşak
List	Candidates	Votes	Of total (%)	± from prev.
AK Party	İsmail Güneş, Mehmet Altay	110,931	49.75	
CHP	Dilek Akagün Yılmaz	66,387	39.77	
MHP	None elected	36,394	16.32	
SAADET	None elected	2,682	1.2	
DP	None elected	1,612	0.72	
HAS Party	None elected	1,126	0.5	N/A
Büyük Birlik	None elected	881	0.4	
DSP	None elected	664	0.3	'"`UNIQ−−ref−0000000D−QINU`"'
Labour	None elected	610	0.27	
HEPAR	None elected	503	0.23	
DYP	None elected	460	0.21	
MP	None elected	220	0.1	
TKP	None elected	198	0.09	
Nationalist Conservative	None elected	192	0.09	
Liberal Democrat	None elected	117	0.05	
Turnout		222,977	91.55	

=== June 2015 ===
Abbr.	Party	Votes	%
AK Party	Justice and Development Party	86,399	38%
CHP	Republican People's Party	64,442	28.4%
MHP	Nationalist Movement Party	63,310	27.9%
HDP	Peoples' Democratic Party	5,422	2.4%
SP	Felicity Party	4,107	1.8%
	Other	3,582	1.6%
Total		227,262	
Turnout		90.45	
source: YSK

=== November 2015 ===
Abbr.	Party	Votes	%
AK Party	Justice and Development Party	105,992	46.6%
CHP	Republican People's Party	69,188	30.4%
MHP	Nationalist Movement Party	41,364	18.2%
HDP	Peoples' Democratic Party	4,013	1.8%
SP	Felicity Party	1,684	0.7%
	Other	5,345	2.3%
Total		227,586	
Turnout		90.45	
source: YSK

=== 2018 ===
Abbr.	Party	Votes	%
AK Party	Justice and Development Party	100,364	42.5%
CHP	Republican People's Party	67031	28.4%
IYI	Good Party	30,507	12.9%
MHP	Nationalist Movement Party	24,672	10.5%
HDP	Peoples' Democratic Party	6,195	2.6%
SP	Felicity Party	3,263	1.4%
	Other	3,975	1.7%
Total		236,007	
Turnout		91.12	
source: YSK

== Presidential elections ==
=== 2014 ===
Presidential Election 2014: Uşak
Party	Candidate	Votes	%
AK Party	Recep Tayyip Erdoğan	106,080	50.55
Independent	Ekmeleddin İhsanoğlu	98,439	46.91
HDP	Selahattin Demirtaş	5,326	2.54
Total votes		209,845	100.00
Rejected ballots		5,284	2.46
Turnout		215,129	84.72
Recep Tayyip Erdoğan win			
