= Şahap Kavcıoğlu =

Turkish economist and politician

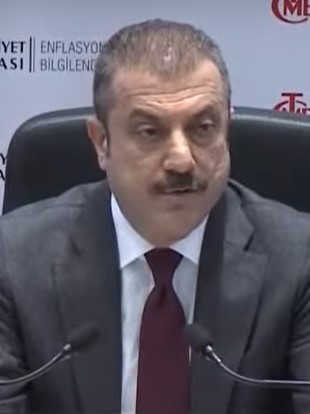
- Kavcıoğlu in 2021

Governor of the Central Bank of Turkey
- In office 20 March 2021 – 9 June 2023
- Preceded by: Naci Ağbal
- Succeeded by: Hafize Gaye Erkan

Member of the Grand National Assembly of Turkey
- In office November 2015 – June 2018
- Constituency: Bayburt

Personal details
- Born: Şahap Kavcıoğlu; 23 May 1967 (age 59) Bayburt, Turkey
- Party: Justice and Development Party
- Children: 3
- Education: Dokuz Eylül University (BS); Marmara University (PhD)

Şahap Kavcıoğlu (born 23 May 1967) is a Turkish banker and politician. He was a Member of the Grand National Assembly of Turkey for the Justice and Development Party (AKP) and was the Governor of the Central Bank of the Republic of Turkey from 2021 to 2023. He is also a contributor to the newspaper Yeni Safak and is described as a supporter of the economic policies of Recep Tayyip Erdoğan.

== Education ==
He graduated in economics at the Dokuz Eylül University and followed up on his studies at the Istanbul University obtaining a degree as an Audit Specialist. He studied Business Administration at Hasting's College in England. In 2003, he earned a Ph.D from the Banking and Insurance Institute of the Marmara University.

== Professional career ==
Beginning in 1991, he served during nine years in several positions as well as an Assistant General Manager at Esbank. According to his LinkedIn page, from 2003 onwards Kavcıoğlu served as a regional coordinator for two years and a deputy general manager for Halkbank for ten years. On 20 March 2021, Kavcıoğlu replaced Naci Ağbal as the Chief of the Turkish Central Bank the day after a raise of the interest rate to 19%. Since, Kavcıoğlu supported Erdoğans desires for lower interest rates and cut them from 19% to 15%. The lower interest of 15%, was met with a fall of the Turkish Lira (₺) to a temporary all-time low of 13.49 ₺ per Dollar. By March 2023, the interest rate was cut to 8.5%. Since the re-election Erdoğan in May 2023 and the appointment of Mehmet Simsek as the new Minister of Finance, the media considered he would be replaced by Hafize Gaye Erkan, a former banker at Goldman Sachs. On 8 June 2023, he was formally replaced by Erkan by a presidential decree by Erdoğan and now serves as the director of the Banking Regulation and Supervision Agency (BDDK).

== Political career ==
Representing the Justice and Development Party (AKP) for Bayburt, he was elected to the Turkish Parliament in the General Elections of November 2015.

== Plagiarism allegations ==
He was accused of having performed plagiarism in the thesis he presented to the Marmara University, as passages in his thesis and the annual report of the Turkish Central Bank are exactly the same.

== Publications ==
He is the author of several papers and two books.

== Personal life ==
Kavcıoğlu is married and has three children. He is a Congress Member of Galatasaray Sports Club and also the Dokuz Eylül University Alumni Association.
