= Naci Ağbal =

Turkish politician (born 1968)

Governor of the Central Bank of Turkey
- In office 7 November 2020 – 20 March 2021
- President: Recep Tayyip Erdoğan
- Preceded by: Murat Uysal
- Succeeded by: Şahap Kavcıoğlu

President of the Directorate of Presidential Strategy and Budget
- In office 24 July 2018 – 7 November 2020
- President: Recep Tayyip Erdoğan
- Preceded by: position established
- Succeeded by: İbrahim Şenel

Minister of Finance
- In office 24 November 2015 – 10 July 2018
- Prime Minister: Ahmet Davutoğlu; Binali Yıldırım
- Preceded by: Mehmet Şimşek
- Succeeded by: Berat Albayrak

Undersecretary of Finance
- In office 12 June 2009 – 9 February 2015
- Prime Minister: Recep Tayyip Erdoğan; Ahmet Davutoğlu
- Preceded by: Hasan Basri Aktan
- Succeeded by: İsa Coşkun

Member of the Grand National Assembly
- In office 7 June 2015 – 7 July 2018
- Constituency: Bayburt (June 2015, Nov 2015)

Personal details
- Born: 1 January 1968 (age 58) Bayburt, Turkey
- Party: Justice and Development Party
- Education: Istanbul University (BA); University of Exeter (MBA)
- Occupation: Civil servant, politician
- Cabinet: 64th, 65th

Naci Ağbal (Turkish pronunciation: [nɑːˌdʒi ɑːˈbɑɫ], born 1 January 1968) is a Turkish politician and former civil servant from the Justice and Development Party (AKP) who served as the Minister of Finance between 2015 and 2018. He was a Member of Parliament for the electoral district of Bayburt, a position he held until 2018 after being elected during the June 2015 general election. He previously served as the Undersecretary to the Ministry of Finance between 2009 and 2015, resigning in order to contest the election.

== Early life and career ==
Naci Ağbal was born on 1 January 1968 in Bayburt and graduated from Istanbul University's Faculty of Political Sciences in 1989. He began his career in the same year by entering the Inspection Board, later becoming a finance inspector in 1993. In 2003, he became a department manager at the General Directorate of Revenues and became the General Director of Budget and Financial Control in 2007. In October 2008, he was elected by the Cabinet of Turkey to the Council of Higher Education (YÖK), having been a Board of Trustees member of Ahmet Yesevi University since 8 March 2008. On 12 June 2009, he became the undersecretary to the Ministry of Finance.

== Political career ==
Ağbal was one of the 200 bureaucrats who resigned from their civil service positions in February 2015 in order to stand as candidates in the June 2015 general election. He was put forward as a Justice and Development Party (AKP) candidate for his hometown of Bayburt and was subsequently elected to Parliament. He was re-elected in the November 2015 general election.

=== Minister of Finance ===
After the AKP won a parliamentary majority in the November 2015 election, Prime Minister Ahmet Davutoğlu appointed Ağbal as Finance Minister in his new government on 24 November 2015. Ağbal replaced Mehmet Şimşek, who was appointed as a Deputy Prime Minister of Turkey having served as Finance Minister since 2009. In his first statement since being appointed as Minister, Ağbal claimed that the Turkish economy was entering a new 'reform' period and that the government would never stray from the principles of financial discipline. He stressed the need for creating a strong financial infrastructure in order to advance economic growth. Outgoing Finance Minister Mehmet Şimşek praised his successor for his previous work as Undersecretary, with both committing their economic program to one of fiscal conservatism during their terms in government.

=== Governor of the Turkish Central Bank ===
On 7 November 2020, he was appointed the Governor of the Central Bank of Turkey, replacing Murat Uysal, who was unable to stop the fall of the Turkish lira, which had lost more than 40% against the Dollar since January 2020. He was sacked by Recep Tayyip Erdoğan on 20 March 2021.

== See also ==
- List of Turkish civil servants

Political offices
Preceded by Mehmet Şimşek	Minister of Finance; 2015–2018	Succeeded by Berat Albayrak
