= Bayburt (electoral district) =

Electoral district for the Grand National Assembly of Turkey

Coordinates: 37°50′N 34°45′E

- electoral district for the Grand National Assembly of Turkey
- Bayburt shown within Turkey
- Province: Bayburt
- Electorate: 50,079

Current electoral district
- Created: 1991
- Seats: 1 Historical: 1 (2011) 2 (1999–2007, 2015)
- Turnout at last election: 87.13%
- Representation
- AK Party: 1 / 1

Bayburt is an electoral district of the Grand National Assembly of Turkey. It elects one member of parliament (deputies) to represent the province of the same name for a five-year term, using the D'Hondt method, a party-list proportional representation system. However, since it has only one seat, election is effectively first-past-the-post.

== Members ==
Population reviews of each electoral district are conducted before each general election, which can lead to certain districts being granted a smaller or greater number of parliamentary seats. Bayburt elected two Members of Parliament between 1999 and 2007. However, with population growth not keeping up with the rest of the country, Bayburt became Turkey's only single-member electoral constituency for the 2011 general election. Ülkü Gökalp Güney won the most votes in the 2002 general election and joined the AKP in order to contest the 2007 general election.

MPs for Bayburt, 2002 onwards
Election	2002 (22nd Parliament)	2007 (23rd Parliament)	2011 (24th Parliament)	June 2015 (25th Parliament)	November 2015 (26th Parliament)	2018 (27th Parliament)
MP	Fetani Battal; AK Party		Bünyamin Özbek; AK Party	Naci Ağbal; AK Party		Fetani Battal; AK Party
MP	Ülkü Gökalp Güney; Independent	Ülkü Gökalp Güney; AK Party	No seat	Karabey Kadri Karaoğlu; MHP	Şahap Kavcıoğlu; AK Party	No seat

== General elections ==
=== 2011 ===
2011 general election: Bayburt
Party	Candidate	Votes	%	±%
AK Party	Bünyamin Özbek ✓ ▼1	27,318	63.39	▲2.64
MHP	Şeref Oruç	10,434	24.21	▲4.88
SAADET	Hacı Murat Kumbasar	2,033	4.72	▼3.88
CHP	Hacı Dursun Yaşaroğlu	1,676	3.89	▲0.98
HAS Party	Erkan Şengün	597	1.39	▲1.39
DP	Nafiz Kahraman	561	1.30	▼4.60
Büyük Birlik	Emre Yalçın	201	0.47	▲0.47
DYP	Erol Akbal	100	0.23	▲0.23
Nationalist Conservative	Zeynep Yılmaz	67	0.16	▲0.16
Labour	Nedim Köroğlu	29	0.07	▼0.08
Communist_Party_of_Turkey_(today)	Tahsin Sorkun	27	0.06	▼0.04
DSP	Hasan Uğurtürk	26	0.06	N/A
Liberal Democrat	İbrahim Serdar Çetintürk	15	0.03	▼0.07
MP	Yusuf Ziya Soytürk	14	0.03	▲0.03
HEPAR	No candidate	0	0.00	0.00
Total votes		43,098	100.00	
Rejected ballots		672	1.54	▲0.97
Turnout		43,635	87.13	▲7.77

=== June 2015 ===
Abbr.	Party	Votes	%
AKP	Justice and Development Party	27,219	60.3%
MHP	Nationalist Movement Party	14,461	32%
SP	Felicity Party	1,306	2.9%
CHP	Republican People's Party	1,110	2.5%
	Other	1,080	2.4%
Total		45,176	
Turnout		85.05	
source: YSK

=== November 2015 ===
Abbr.	Party	Votes	%
AKP	Justice and Development Party	32,730	73.4%
MHP	Nationalist Movement Party	9,383	21%
CHP	Republican People's Party	915	2.1%
SP	Felicity Party	637	1.4%
	Other	955	2.1%
Total		44,620	
Turnout		85.89	
source: YSK

=== 2018 ===
Abbr.	Party	Votes	%
AKP	Justice and Development Party	27,008	56.7%
MHP	Nationalist Movement Party	13,128	27.6%
IYI	Good Party	2,941	6.2%
CHP	Republican People's Party	1,823	3.8%
SP	Felicity Party	1,571	3.3%
	Other	1,116	2.3%
Total		47,637	
Turnout		86.21	
source: YSK

== Presidential elections ==
=== 2014 ===
2014 presidential election: Bayburt
Party	Candidate	Votes	%
AK Party	Recep Tayyip Erdoğan	34,117	80.20
Independent	Ekmeleddin İhsanoğlu	8,106	19.05
HDP	Selahattin Demirtaş	319	0.75
Total votes		42,542	100.00
Rejected ballots		787	1.82
Turnout		43,329	79.22
Recep Tayyip Erdoğan win			
