= Esbank =

Former Turkish bank

- Company type: Bank
- Industry: Banking
- Founded: 15 September 1927
- Defunct: 2001
- Headquarters: Eskişehir, Turkey
- Products: Financial services

Esbank or Eskişehir Bank (Turkish: Eskişehir Bankası) was a former Turkish bank.

The bank was founded on 15 September 1927 as a local bank in Eskişehir, Turkey . Its founding capital was TL 500000. Up to 1955, it was a single-office bank serving only in Eskişehir. After 1955 with a number of branch offices it became a regional bank. After 1980 it became a national bank. Towards the end of 1990s the number of branch offices raised to 91. However, in 2001, it was merged to Etibank.
