= Fatih Karahan =

Governor of the Central Bank of Turkey

Governor of the Central Bank of Turkey
- Incumbent
- Assumed office 3 February 2024
- Preceded by: Hafize Gaye Erkan

Personal details
- Born: 1982 (age 43–44) Eskişehir, Turkey
- Education: Boğaziçi University (BS); University of Pennsylvania (MA, PhD)

Fatih Karahan (born 1982) is a Turkish economist who has served as Governor of the Central Bank of the Republic of Turkey since 3 February 2024. Karahan previously worked in private practice as an economist for Amazon, and as an economist at the Federal Reserve Bank of New York.

== Early life and education ==
Fatih Karahan was born in Eskişehir, Turkey in 1982. He entered Istanbul High School in 1993. After completing his secondary education, he studied Mathematics and Industrial Engineering at Boğaziçi University, graduating in 2006.

He went on to study in the United States at University of Pennsylvania, receiving both a Master of Economics and a doctoral degree in economics in 2012 under the supervision of Dirk Kruger and Guido Menzio.

== Career ==
After earning his PhD, Karahan started his professional career as an economist at the Federal Reserve Bank of New York. He was the head of the labor and product market department and advisor for monetary politics until 2022. He taught as an adjunct professor at Columbia University and New York University in 2022.

Karahan became a senior economist at US-based Amazon in 2022 and was appointed principal economist there in November the same year. His main research interests include labor market policies, and macroeconomic effects of income risk of the housing market and firm dynamics. In addition, Karahan’s research focused on the role of geographic mismatch in unemployment during the Great Recession (2008-2012), the persistence of income shocks over the life cycle, and the effect of skill returns on college premium. Prior to his appointment to the Central Bank, Karahan was reportedly considered for a deputy ministerial position under Minister of Treasury and Finance Mehmet Şimşek.

=== Central Bank of the Republic of Turkey ===
On 28 July 2023, Karahan was appointed Deputy Governor of the Central Bank of the Republic of Turkey. After the resignation of the previous governor, Hafize Gaye Erkan on 2 February 2024, Karahan was appointed Governor the next day. Following his appointment, Bloomberg News reported that analysts from JPMorgan Chase and Morgan Stanley anticipate that Karahan will take a more hawkish approach than his predecessor.

In March 2025, Fatih Karahan was honored with the Foreign Policy Association Medal in recognition of the Central Bank of the Republic of Türkiye’s efforts to enhance relations with international institutions and global central banks as well as to increase public awareness.

== Personal life ==
Karahan is the nephew of career diplomat Hasan Murat Mercan, the Turkish Ambassador to the United States. Karahan has two children.

Government offices
Preceded by Hafize Gaye Erkan	Governor of the Central Bank of Turkey; 2024–present	Incumbent
