= Hafize Gaye Erkan =

Former Governor of the Central Bank of Turkey

Governor of the Central Bank of Turkey
- In office 9 June 2023 – 2 February 2024
- Preceded by: Şahap Kavcıoğlu
- Succeeded by: Fatih Karahan

Personal details
- Born: 1979 (age 46–47) Istanbul, Turkey
- Spouse: Batur Biçer
- Children: 1
- Education: Istanbul High School
- Alma mater: Boğaziçi University (BS); Princeton University (PhD)
- Occupation: Accountant; banker

Hafize Gaye Erkan (born 1979, Istanbul) is the former governor of the Central Bank of Turkey. She is a former co-CEO and president of First Republic Bank and was a member of the company's board of directors. She also was a board member at Tiffany & Co and a director at Marsh & Mclennan Cos Inc.

== Personal life ==
She was born in Istanbul, Turkey in 1979, to an engineer father and a mother who taught mathematics and physics. She graduated from Istanbul High School and enrolled at Boğaziçi University's (BOUN) Department of Industrial engineering in 1997, graduating as valedictorian with a BSc in 2001. She earned a PhD in Operations research and Financial engineering from Princeton University, and is a graduate of Harvard Business School's Advanced Management Program and the Stanford Graduate School of Business Executive Program in Leadership.

She is married to Batur Biçer, managing director at Napier Park Global Capital.

== Career ==
In 2005 she joined Goldman Sachs as an associate, and was named managing director and Head of Financial Institutions Group Analytics and Strategies in 2011.

She joined First Republic Bank in 2014 as its chief investment officer and co-chief risk officer, she was also appointed as the chief deposit officer in January 2016 before becoming the bank's president in May 2017. Erkan was elected to the board of directors on February 13, 2019. In July 2021, she became co-CEO of First Republic, alongside Jim Herbert, the founder of the bank. Herbert resigned due to health concerns in December 2021; a month later, Erkan also resigned.

She joined the board of directors at Fortune 500 firm Marsh McLennan in March 2022, and also served on the board of directors for Tiffany & Co. from 2019 through the company's acquisition by LVMH in 2021.

On February 11, 2022, the board of directors of Marsh McLennan appointed Erkan as director effective on March 1, 2022. She was again re-elected for the role on May 23, 2023. On June 27, 2022, Greystone & Co Inc (an American-based national real estate finance company) appointed her as its chief executive officer (CEO). Her executive responsibilities commenced in September 2022 and ended in December 2022.

== Central Bank of Turkey ==
After the re-election of Recep Tayyip Erdoğan in May 2023 and the appointment of Mehmet Şimşek as the new Minister of Finance, the media reported that Central Bank governor Şahap Kavcıoğlu would be replaced by Erkan. On 8 June 2023, Erkan became the governor by a presidential decree by Erdoğan, becoming the first female head of the Turkish Central Bank.

Turkish President Recep Tayyip Erdogan appointed Erkan as the new central bank governor on June 8, 2023, replacing Sahap Kavcioglu who served as governor since March 20, 2021. Under her leadership, the central bank turned away from Erdogan's imposition of low interest rates that had caused soaring inflation and turned away foreign investors in favor of increasing the rates to 45% from the previous 8.5%, which the bank said had stopped inflation by January 2024.

In late 2023 Erkan told a local newspaper that house prices in Istanbul were higher than in Manhattan, so she chose to move in with her parents.

On 2 February, Erkan announced her resignation from the central bank following an article published in the newspaper Sözcü that said one of the bank's employees had been fired at the instigation of Erkan's father. Erkan called the report "a major reputation assassination campaign". The following day, she was removed from office by the President and replaced by then Deputy Governor Fatih Karahan.

== Awards and recognition ==
In 2001 Boğaziçi University named her the "Best Student in the Last Ten Years". She also received Princeton University's Gordon Y.S. Wu Fellowship for graduate study in engineering.

She received a grant from the National Science Foundation for her thesis and multiple Excellence in Teaching awards. In 2003, she was selected as a Sigma Xi Honor Society member.

In 2018 she was named to San Francisco Business Times’ 40 Under 40 and Crain New York Business’ 40 Under 40 lists (at age 38). and was named to the Crain's list of Notable Women in Banking and Finance in 2019.

According to San Francisco Business Times, as of 2018 she was the only woman under 40 who was a president or CEO at America's 100 largest banks. She was an also named to American Banker's "Women to Watch" list.
