= Dirk Krüger =

German economist

Dirk Krüger is a German economist and currently Walter H. and Leonore C. Annenberg Professor in the Social Sciences and Professor of Economics at the University of Pennsylvania. He holds a secondary appointment in the finance department at the Wharton School, and is außerplanmäßiger Professor at the Universität Bielefeld, Germany. His research focuses on macroeconomic risk, public finance and labor economics.

== Education ==
Krüger studied for his diploma in economics at Bielefeld University as a scholar of the Friedrich Ebert Foundation. After graduating in 1995, he went on to further study at the University of Minnesota and received his Ph.D. in 1999.

== Career ==
Stanford University hired him as an assistant professor of economics in 1999. He was a Hoover Fellow at the Stanford-based Hoover Institution from 2002 to 2003. He left Stanford for an assistant professorship at the University of Pennsylvania in 2003. He then worked as a full professor at the Goethe University Frankfurt from 2004 to 2006, when he returned to the University of Pennsylvania as an associate professor. He was promoted to full professorship in 2008 and to a chaired professorship in 2018.

Krüger has worked for a range of academic journals in an editorial capacity, such as the Review of Economic Studies, the American Economic Review, the Journal of the European Economic Association and is currently the editor of the International Economic Review.

The Econometric Society elected him fellow in 2020. He is also a fellow of the European Economic Association and the Society for the Advancement of Economic Theory (SAET).

== Selected works ==
- Krueger, Dirk; Perri, Fabrizio (2006). "Does Income Inequality Lead to Consumption Inequality? Evidence and Theory1". Review of Economic Studies. 73: 163–193. doi:10.1111/j.1467-937X.2006.00373.x. hdl:10419/25457.
- Fernández-Villaverde, Jesús; Krueger, Dirk (2007). "Consumption over the Life Cycle: Facts from Consumer Expenditure Survey Data". Review of Economics and Statistics. 89 (3): 552–565. doi:10.1162/rest.89.3.552. S2CID 57570211.
- Conesa, Juan Carlos; Kitao, Sagiri; Krueger, Dirk (2009). "Taxing Capital? Not a Bad Idea After All!". American Economic Review. 99: 25–48. doi:10.1257/aer.99.1.25. S2CID 2915689.
- Glover, Andrew; Heathcote, Jonathan; Krueger, Dirk; Ríos-Rull, José-Víctor (2020). "Intergenerational Redistribution in the Great Recession". Journal of Political Economy. 128 (10): 3730–3778. doi:10.1086/708820. S2CID 216264073.
- Wu, Chunzan; Krueger, Dirk (2021). "Consumption Insurance against Wage Risk: Family Labor Supply and Optimal Progressive Income Taxation". American Economic Journal: Macroeconomics. 13: 79–113. doi:10.1257/mac.20180125. S2CID 214277708.
