= Central Bank of the Republic of Turkey =

Central Bank of Turkey

Central Bank of the Republic of Türkiye Türkiye Cumhuriyet Merkez Bankası

- CBRT Tower at the IFC is the headquarters of the Turkish Central Bank
- Central bank of: Turkey
- Headquarters: Ümraniye, Istanbul, Turkey
- Coordinates: 39.939217°N 32.852665°E
- Established: 30 June 1930; 96 years ago
- Ownership: Mixed ownership: Treasury and banks
- Governor: Fatih Karahan
- Currency: Turkish lira TRY (ISO 4217)
- Reserves: US$163 billion (July 2024)
- Bank rate: 39.5% (October 2025)
- Preceded by: Ottoman Bank
- Website: tcmb.gov.tr

The Central Bank of the Republic of Türkiye (CBRT) (Note: Turkish: Türkiye Cumhuriyet Merkez Bankası, TCMB) is the central bank of Turkey. Its responsibilities include conducting monetary and exchange rate policy, managing international reserves of Turkey, as well as printing and issuing banknotes, and establishing, maintaining and regulating payment systems in the country.

The CBRT is tasked by law to achieve and maintain price and financial stability in Turkey, and has a mandate to use, by its own discretion, whichever policy instrument at its disposal to reach these objectives. Therefore, it has instrument but not goal independence. Since 2006, the CBRT follows a full-fledged inflation targeting regime.

== History of central banking in Turkey ==
=== The Ottoman Empire Period ===
In the Ottoman Empire, economic activities such as Treasury operations, money and credit transactions and trade in gold and foreign currencies were executed by various establishments such as the Treasury, the Mint, jewelers, moneylenders, foundations and guilds. In this organizational structure that prevailed until the second half of the 19th century, the Ottoman Empire minted gold coins on behalf of the Sultan. The Ottoman Empire put cash banknotes (Ottoman Turkish:Kaime-i nakdiye-i mutebere) into circulation in 1840. During the Crimean War, in 1854, the Ottoman Empire, which borrowed from other nations for the first time in history, needed a state bank to assume an intermediary function in the repayment of external debts. As a result, the Ottoman Bank, headquartered in London, was established with English capital in 1856. The fundamental powers of the Bank were limited to lending in small amounts, making advance payments to the Government and discounting some Treasury bills.

In 1863, the Ottoman Bank was restructured as an English-French partnership under the name Imperial Ottoman Bank, and was granted the sole privilege of issuing banknotes for a period of thirty years. The Bank, acting as Treasurer of the State, was assigned to collect State revenues, make payments on behalf of the Treasury and discount Treasury bills, as well as making interest and principal payments pertaining to domestic and foreign debts. The capital of the Imperial Ottoman Bank retained by other nations triggered reactions in time and these reactions laid the foundation for establishing a national central bank. Efforts towards establishing a central bank with domestic capital culminated in the establishment of the Ottoman National Credit Bank (Ottoman Turkish: Osmanlı İtibar-ı Millî Bankası) on 11 March 1917. However, the defeat of the Ottoman Empire in the First World War prevented the bank from becoming a national bank, which would have assumed central bank functions.

=== The Republican Period ===
After the First World War, on account of the global trend of nations to formulate their monetary policies independently by establishing their respective central banks, which would be authorized to issue money, and to reinforce the political independence gained in the War of Independence with economic independence, deliberations about the establishment of a central bank in Turkey gained pace. This issue was first addressed in the 1923 Izmir Economic Congress with a special emphasis on founding a “national state bank”. In 1927, the Minister of Finance Abdülhalik Renda submitted a draft bill on the establishment of a central bank. Following the enactment of the law, Turkey exchanged views with the central banks of other countries’ in establishing the Turkish Central Bank. In 1928, having been invited to Turkey, Gerard Vissering, a member of the Central Bank of Netherlands, board of governors, highlighted in his report the necessity of an independent central bank not affiliated to the Government; espoused, in 1929, by Italian expert Count Volpi who suggested that the establishment of a central bank was necessary to ensure stability of the Turkish currency. Following these developments, the Government took the initiative to draft the necessary legal framework for the establishment of a central bank, and a draft was prepared for the Central Bank with the contributions of Prof. Leon Morf from the University of Lausanne. The law was enacted by the Grand National Assembly of Turkey on 11 June 1930, and published in the Official Gazette of 30 June 1930 under the name “The Law on the Central Bank of the Republic of Turkey No. 1715”. Following the centralization of duties carried out by various institutions and organizations, the Central Bank started to function on 3 October 1931.

Initially, the central bank was not independent. Instead, it followed the government's lead.

The shares of the Bank, which acquired legal status as a joint stock company; - to manifest that ‘it is not a public entity’, and that ‘it is independent’, were divided into (A), (B), (C) and (D) classes. Class (A) shares belong solely to the Treasury, and, for the purpose of strengthening the Bank's independence, it is stipulated in the Law No. 1715 that these shares shall not constitute more than fifteen percent of the capital. Class (B) shares are allocated to national banks; Class (C) shares are allocated to banks other than the national banks and to privileged companies; and Class (D) shares are allocated to Turkish commercial institutions and to legal and real persons of Turkish nationality.

According to the Law No. 1715, the primary objective of the Central Bank was to support the economic development of the country. To this end, the Bank was authorized to set rediscount ratios (the main policy tool), regulate money markets and the circulation of money, execute Treasury operations, and take measures related to the stability of the Turkish currency. The Bank was vested with the exclusive privilege of issuing banknotes in Turkey. Additionally, the Bank also assumed the role of the treasurer of the Government. Under the fixed exchange rate regime implemented during that period, the Government was the authority to set the exchange rates. Independence of the Central Bank and low levels of inflation prevailed during the 1930s, as the Government could not intervene in the Bank's field of authority and decisions.

=== Post-Second World War Period ===
During the 1940s, which were dominated by the adverse effects of the Second World War, the Central Bank, like its peers all over the world, implemented policies to offset the public finance deficit rather than implementing an independent monetary policy. Therefore, the general price level increased more than threefold in the 1938-1948 period. During the 1950s, growth and rapid development were financed by Central Bank sources, and these sources were rendered available to public authority through short-term advances provided to the Treasury. An important development for the Central Bank in that period was the establishment of the Banknote Printing Plant in 1955 and from 1957 onwards banknote-printing started in Turkey. With the transition to planned economy in the 1960s, the Central Bank continued to provide resources to the public sector by pursuing expansionary monetary policies made possible by the economic circumstances and industrial development. It was during this time that the majority of practices related to foreign exchange control were transferred to the Central Bank.

=== The Law on the Central Bank of the Republic of Turkey No. 1211 ===
In order to adjust to the global changes that occurred in the aftermath of the Second World War and to enhance the efficiency of the Central Bank, the Law on the Central Bank of the Republic of Turkey No. 1211 was accepted on 14 January 1970. Thus, the Central Bank, turning a new page in its history, was vested with a new structure in line with, albeit partially, novelties in the field of the economy and central banking of the time. This Law brought significant changes to the legal status, organizational structure, duties and powers of the Bank. As per the Central Bank's legal status as a joint stock company, its capital was increased from TL 15 million to TL 25 million. Furthermore, it was stipulated that the Treasury's share should not constitute less than 51 percent of the capital. With Law No. 1211, the “Office of the Governor” was founded to ensure equivalence in terms of international representation, foreign relations and protocol, and Mr. Naim Talu became the first “governor” to assume this title. Moreover, a new decision-making body composed of the governor and the vice governors was established under the name of the executive committee. The top-level decision-making body of the Bank, the Board of Directors, which consisted of eight members, was transformed into the “Board” of the Bank, consisting of six members. Besides, the General Assembly of Shareholders was named the General Assembly; Board of Auditors was named the Auditing Committee; and the General Directorate was named Head Office. This Law also introduced significant changes in terms of enhancing the Bank's duties and powers. First of all, the Central Bank's control over direct and indirect monetary policy instruments was extended and the Bank was authorized to conduct open market operations to regulate money supply and liquidity. Meanwhile, it was decided that the Government would consult the Central Bank while taking measures with respect to money and loans. The Bank was authorized, through rediscount transactions, to lend medium-term loans to support investments and economic development. The upper limit for short-term advances to the Treasury was increased to 15 percent of budget allocations pertaining to the respective year.

=== Post-1980 Period ===
The 1980s saw important developments that might be described as a turning point for both the Turkish economy and the Central Bank. The decisions of 24 January 1980 sparked a structural transformation in the Turkish economy. Price controls were abandoned so that prices would be formed within the framework of market mechanisms, and a policy of free trade was adopted. With the launch of the financial liberalization process, important steps were taken to ensure the necessary infrastructure for implementation of monetary and exchange rate policies in compliance with the market economy. In the same period, it was decided that interest rates on deposits and loans would be determined by market conditions. Furthermore, the fixed exchange rate system was abandoned and the Turkish currency devalued against foreign currencies. In 1983, the Bank was empowered to manage gold and foreign exchange reserves effectively. In addition, it was incorporated into the Law that the Bank would carry out its fundamental duties in compliance with the basic requirements of the economy and with the objective of achieving price stability. The Central Bank started to conduct open market operations in 1987 and became a pioneer in the establishment of money and foreign exchange markets in the modern sense. In 1989, with “Decree No. 32 on the Protection of the Value of Turkish Currency”, economic units were allowed to conduct foreign exchange transactions, and having declared the Turkish currency “convertible”, a relatively more flexible exchange rate regime was adopted. In 1990, the Bank announced a monetary program for the first time, which aimed to meet the liquidity requirement of the market without endangering the stability of exchange rates and interest rates. The targets announced in 1990 were achieved; yet, problems such as the pressure of the Gulf War on the financial sector, political instability, lax financial policy and the fragile structure of the banking sector hindered achievement of macroeconomic stability and led to a financial crisis in the first quarter of 1994. The initial regulations proposed to prevent financing of public debts – a key element of the period of high inflation – by Central Bank resources coincide with this period. On 21 April 1994, limitations were imposed on the Treasury's use of Central Bank funds; and with the protocol signed between the Central Bank and the Treasury in 1997, it was concluded that the Treasury would not use short-term advances from the Central Bank from 1998 onwards.

=== The 2001 Crisis and Post-Crisis Period ===
In the 1995-1999 period, the Central Bank followed policies geared towards ensuring stability in the financial markets. A period of uncontrollable inflation paved the way for the adoption, in the year 2000, of an exchange rate based new stability program. However, amid the aggravating loss of confidence in the economy that started by the end of 2000 and the crisis that broke out in mid-2001, the said program ceased to be implemented and free floating exchange rate regime was adopted on 22 February 2001. Following the crisis, the Turkish economy underwent a structural transformation. During this process, significant amendments were made to the CBRT Law on 25 April 2001; above all, it was explicitly described in the Law that the primary objective of the Central Bank was to achieve and maintain price stability. Within this scope, it was stipulated that the Bank would determine at its own discretion the monetary policy that it would implement and the monetary policy instruments that it was going to use; thus, the Bank was vested with “instrument independence”. Moreover, the Law also stipulated that the Bank would support the growth and employment policies of the Government without conflicting with the objective of achieving and maintaining price stability. Besides, achieving financial stability was described as the supportive objective of the Bank. Furthermore, the Law prohibited the Bank from granting advances and extending credit to the Treasury and to public establishments and institutions, and from being a purchaser, in the primary market, of the debt instruments issued by the Treasury and public establishments and institutions. Thus, the utilization of Central Bank funds for the purpose of public finance was prevented. Within the scope of the amendment to the Law, the Monetary Policy Committee was established so as to institutionalize monetary policy strategies and decision-making mechanisms.

=== Inflation Targeting Regime ===
In 2002, the Central Bank adopted a modern monetary policy strategy, namely the “inflation targeting regime”. During the implementation of the implicit inflation targeting regime of the 2002–2005 period, the Bank tried to lay the basis for the regime by ensuring the necessary pre-conditions, strengthened its technical and institutional infrastructure, developed estimation models and expanded its data set. During this process, the Research Department was restructured as the Research and Monetary Policy Department and the Communications Department was set up to ensure effectiveness of communications policies. From 2005 onwards, the Monetary Policy Committee started to announce, in advance, its meeting dates as a yearly calendar, to increase predictability of policy decisions. The outcome of this entire process was the explicit inflation targeting regime that started to be implemented in 2006. Upon achieving some progress in the disinflation process, a two-stage monetary reform was launched in order to emphasize the Bank's determination in its efforts, to enhance the credibility of the Turkish currency, and to eliminate various problems arising from high denomination. In the first stage, six zeros were removed from the Turkish lira, and banknotes of the New Turkish lira (YTL) and coins of the New kuruş (YKr) were put into circulation from 1 January 2005 onwards. On 1 January 2009, the second stage of the reform was launched by removing the prefix “New” used on the “New Turkish lira” and “New kuruş”, and Turkish lira banknotes and coins were put into circulation with new designs and sizes.

== Ownership ==
The CBRT is a joint stock company. Its capital of 25.000 Turkish liras are divided into 250.000 shares. Per the Central Bank Law of Turkey, these shares are divided into four classes:

- Class A shares are allocated solely to the Turkish Ministry of Finance and Treasury.
- Class B shares are allocated to national banks operating in Turkey.
- Class C shares are allocated to banks other than national banks and privileged companies.
- Class D shares are allocated to Turkish commercial institutions and to real and legal persons of Turkish nationality.

As of the end of 2018, class A shares constituted 55.12% of CBRT's capital, whereas class B, C and D shares constituted 25.74%, 0.02% and 19.12%, respectively.

== The CBRT Law ==
CBRT's current powers and duties are defined by a specific law (CBRT law) accepted on 14 January 1970.

The Law on the Central Bank of the Republic of Turkey, No. 1715 was enacted on 11 June 1930. According to the Law No. 1715, the basic aim of the Bank was to support economic development of the country. In order to fulfill this aim, the Bank was given the following duties:

- To set rediscount ratios and to regulate money markets,
- To execute Treasury operations,
- To take, jointly with the Government, all measures to protect the value of Turkish currency.

With the introduction of economic development plans in Turkey in the 1960s, several changes were made in the Central Bank Law. For the same purpose, the Law No. 1211, which was enacted on 26 January 1970, redefined the duties and responsibilities of the Central Bank of the Republic of Turkey, so as to implement the money and credit policy within the framework of development plans.

In the second half of the 1980s, the Bank inaugurated interbank money market, foreign exchange money market and started to make use of open market operations.

== Duties and powers ==
"The primary objective of the Bank shall be to achieve and maintain price stability. The Bank shall determine on its own discretion the monetary policy that it shall implement and the monetary policy instruments that it is going to use in order to achieve and maintain price stability.”

Fundamental duties of the Bank are as follows:

- to carry out open market operations
- to protect the value of Turkish lira and to establish the exchange rate policy
- to determine the reserve requirements and liquidity requirement
- to manage the gold and FX reserves of the country
- to regulate the volume and circulation of Turkish lira
- to ensure stability in the financial system and monitor the financial markets

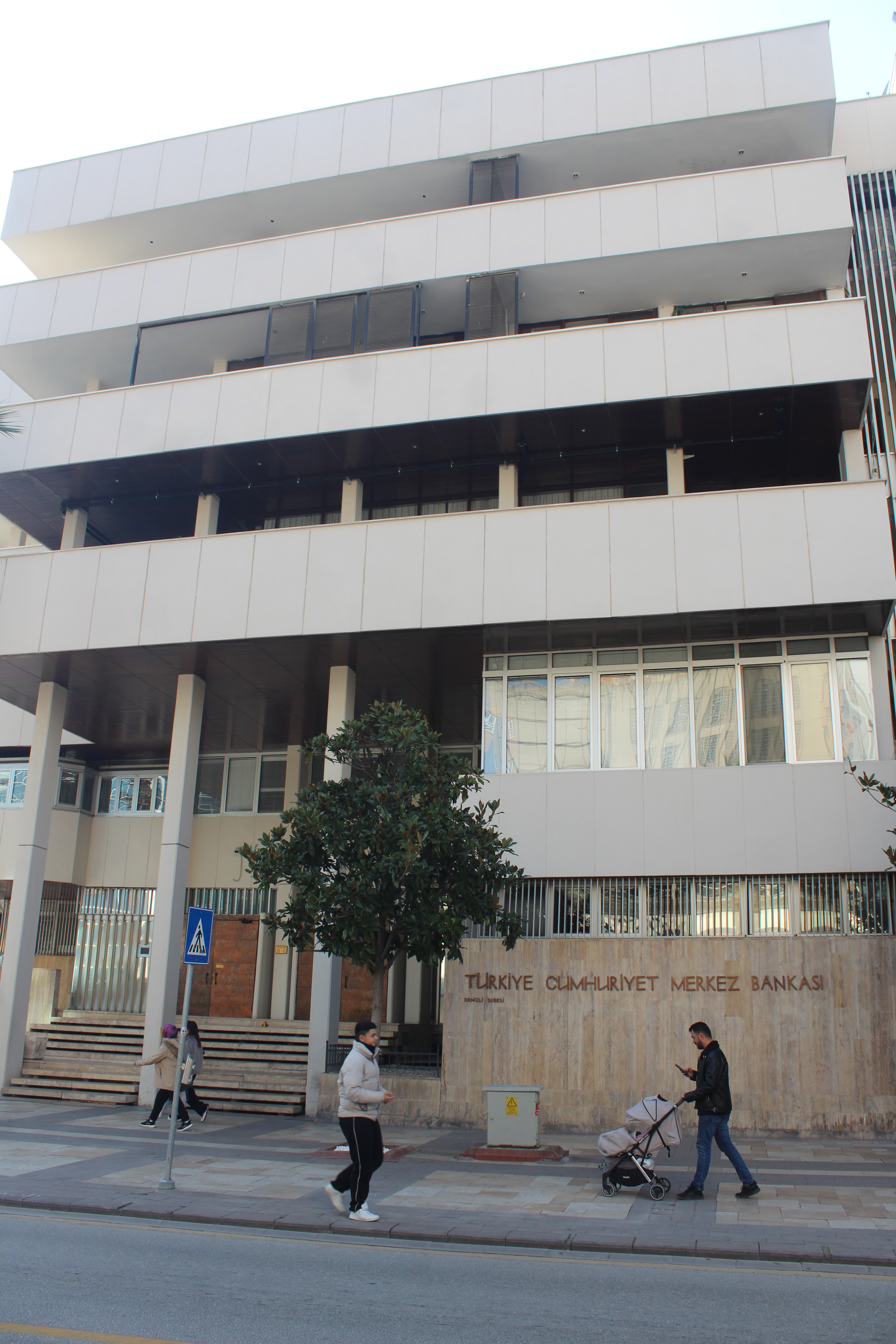
Central Bank of the Republic of Turkey Denizli Branch.

Fundamental powers of the Bank shall be:

- The exclusive right to issue banknotes in Turkey
- The right to determine of the inflation target together and implementation of monetary policy
- The privilege to grant advance to the Savings Deposits Insurance Fund
- The role of the lender of last resort
- The power to request necessary information from financial institutions

== Administration ==
=== General Assembly ===
The General Assembly of the Bank is composed of the shareholders who are registered in the share book of the Bank. The General Assembly convenes each year on a date specified in the Articles of Association. The governor acts as the chairman of the General Assembly.

=== Governor ===
The governor is appointed for a term of four years by a decree of the President of Turkey. The governor may be reappointed upon the expiration of this term.

=== Board ===
The Board is composed of the governor and six members to be elected by the General Assembly. The term of office of board members is three years. The governor is the chairman of the board. One third of the board members are replaced each year. Members whose terms of office have expired may be reelected.

==== Current members ====
- Fatih Karahan
- Nurullah Genç
- Başak Tanınmış Yücememiş
- Elif Haykır Hobikoğlu
- Ertan Aydın
- Muhsin Kar
- Kemal Madenoğlu

=== Monetary Policy Committee ===
The Monetary Policy Committee is chaired by the governor and composed of the deputy governors, a member to be elected by and from among the board members and a member to be appointed with the approval of the President of Turkey on the recommendation of the governor.

==== Current members ====
- Fatih Karahan
- Osman Cevdet Akçay
- Hatice Karahan
- Elif Haykır Hobikoğlu
- Fatma Özkul

=== Auditing Committee ===
The Auditing Committee is composed of four members to be elected by the General Assembly.

==== Current members ====
- Mehmet Babacan
- Ramazan Güngör
- Bekir Bayrakdar
- Metin Toprak

=== Executive committee ===
The executive committee is composed of the deputy governors and chaired by the governor. Deputy governors are appointed by a decree of the President of the Republic for a period of four years. Deputy governors may be reappointed upon the expiration of this term.

==== Current members ====
- Fatih Karahan
- Osman Cevdet Akçay
- Hatice Karahan

== Building ==
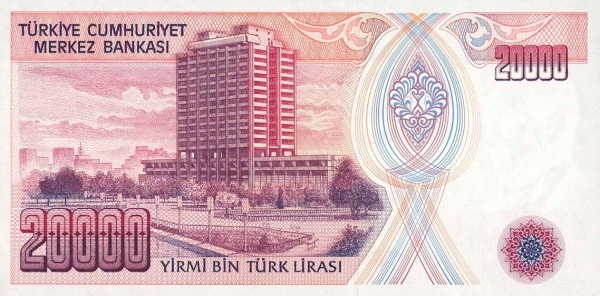
Reverse of the 20,000 Turkish lira banknote (1988-1997) featuring the former headquarters of the Central Bank of Turkey in Ankara.

The former Head Office Building of the bank was depicted on the reverse of the Turkish 50 kuruş banknote of 1944-1947 and of the 2 1/2 lira banknotes of 1952–1966. The new Head Office Building was depicted on the reverse of the 20,000 lira banknotes of 1988–1997.

== See also ==
- List of governors of the Central Bank of the Republic of Turkey
- List of central banks
