= United States v. Atilla =

Iranian sanctions case

U.S. v. Atilla (17-mj- b 2197, U.S. District Court, Southern District of New York) is an Iranian sanctions case in New York. Mehmet Hakan Atilla an executive at Halkbank was accused of conspiring with Iranian-Turkish businessman Reza Zarrab, using the U.S. financial system to conduct transactions on behalf of Iran and other Iranian entities, which were barred by United States sanctions, and to delude U.S. financial institutions by concealing the true nature of these transactions.

Atilla was found guilty for bank fraud and conspiracy to violate U.S. sanctions on Iran.

== Background ==
In December 2013 an investigation involved Reza Zarrab, Iranian billionaire Babak Zanjani, the sons of three ministers (Erdoğan Bayraktar, Muammer Güler and Zafer Çağlayan) in the Turkish government and Egemen Bağış revealed a system to help Iran bypass US sanctions against the country concerning the SWIFT payment system, in a scheme based on Turkish public bank Halkbank, whereby money was transferred to front companies in China and Turkey, and gold bought with that money transferred to Iran via Dubai. However, Prime minister Recep Tayyip Erdogan called the investigation as a "judicial coup" against his government, dismissed the prosecutors and police officials investigating the corruption scheme. The accused parties released soon after.

On 19 March 2016, Reza Zarrab was arrested in Miami, Florida, for conspiring to evade U.S. sanctions against Iran. Halkbank Deputy Chief Executive Mehmet Hakan Atilla, who was in connection with Zarrab, was also arrested in the United States in March 2017 with similar offenses.

== U.S. v. Zarrab ==
U.S. v. Zarrab (15-cr-867, U.S. District Court, Southern District of New York) is an Iranian sanctions case in New York. As of November 2017 it is still unresolved. In March 2016, Turkish-Iranian gold dealer Reza Zarrab was arrested in Miami. Kamelia Jamshidy, an employee of Zarrab's, and Hossein Najafzedah of Bank Mellat were also named in the federal indictment.

Zarrab is accused of violating the Iranian sanctions regime by concealing bank transactions that transferred gold and American currency to the Iranian government. Zarrab, Jamshidy and Najafzedah have been charged with conspiring to defraud the United States, conspiring to violate U.S. sanctions law, bank fraud, and money laundering.

Bloomberg has reported that Iran used the state-run Turkish Bank Turkiye Halk Bankasi to process hundreds of millions of dollars in oil revenue. Prosecutors allege that these transactions were fraudulently concealed as food shipments and other commerce allowed under sanctions.

The case was assigned to U.S. District Judge Richard M. Berman of the Southern District of New York. Turkish President Recep Tayyip Erdoğan and members of his administration have made several requests to the United States to drop the case.

Prosecutors have noted that Zarrab has close ties with Turkish President Recep Tayyip Erdogan and donated $4.5 million to a charity founded by his wife Emine Erdoğan.

== Case ==
Mehmet Hakan Atilla, deputy chief executive officer at state-owned Turkiye Halk Bankasi AS, accused of conspiring with Zarrab to launder money and violate sanctions on Iran, funneling Iranian funds illegally by using the U.S. banking system. In November, 2017, Zarrab cooperated with federal prosecutors and has become key witness in the prosecution of Mehmet Hakan Atilla.

In his testimony Zarrab explained how he paid 50 million dollar in bribes to Turkish Minister of Economic Affairs Zafer Caglayan, on a screen Zarrab showed the amounts and dates of the payments records that were sent to Turkish officials in the inner circle of President Erdogan. Moreover, he claimed Turkish President Erdoğan, prime minister at that time, had personally given orders to start transactions on behalf of Iran.

Mehmet Hakan Atilla was found guilty on five charges related to conspiracy and bank fraud including violating U.S. sanctions on Iran, crimes to deceive the U.S. and defrauding U.S. banking system, but was acquitted of money laundering.

== See also ==
- 2013 corruption scandal in Turkey
- Iranian Transaction and Sanctions Regulations
- Iranian Financial Sanctions Regulations
- Office of Foreign Assets Control
- Türkiye Halk Bankası A.Ş. v. United States (2023)
