= 2013 corruption scandal in Turkey =

17–25 December Corruption and Bribery Operation in Turkey

External videos
- Documentary on the 2013 corruption and bribery investigations in Turkey
- Documentary on the 2013 corruption and bribery investigations in Turkey

External videos
- Turkey in 2013: documentary on the corruption and bribery investigations
- documentary on the corruption and bribery investigations

The 2013 corruption scandal in Turkey also known as the 17–25 December Corruption and Bribery Operation was a series of criminal investigation launched in December 2013 involving businessmen, public officials and relatives of several cabinet ministers in the government of Prime Minister Recep Tayyip Erdoğan. The investigations included allegations of bribery, corruption, fraud, money laundering, gold smuggling and violations of sanctions against Iran.

the first investigation became public on 17 December 2013, when Turkish police detained dozens of people, including the sons of three cabinet members, the general manager of the state owned Halkbank, and Iranian businessman Reza Zarrab. A second investigation was initiated on 25 December, but police did not carry out prosecutor's instructions to detain additional suspects. the investigation triggered a political crisis and were followed by the resignation of three cabinet members, a cabinet reshuffle and extensive reassignment and dismissal of police officers, prosecutors and judges involved in or in association with the investigation.

Erdoğan's government rejected the allegations and characterized the investigation as an attempted political operation by "parallel structure" associated with the Gülen movement. Critics of the government argued that the subsequent removal of investigators and changes to the judiciary judiciary interfered with the corruption investigations. The European Commission reported in 2014 that the government's response raised serious concern about judicial independence and the separation of powers.

The principal December 2013 corruption investigation was discontinued in 2014 with prosecutors deciding not to pursue charges against 53 suspects. In January 2015, the Turkish parliament voted against sending four former ministers implicated in the allegations to the Constitutional Court for trial.

Subsequent proceedings in the United States involving Reza Zarrab and former Halkbank executive Mehmet Hakan Atilla addressed related allegation concerning the circumvention of U.S. sanctions against Iran. Atilla was convicted in 2018.

== Police investigation and allegations ==
On 17 December 2013, the Financial Crime Unit of the Istanbul Security Directorate detained 47 people, including officials from TOKİ (Housing Development Administration of Turkey), the Ministry of Environment and Urban Planning, and the District Municipality of Fatih. Barış Güler, Kaan Çağlayan and Oğuz Bayraktar, who are sons of the Turkish ministers, Muammer Güler (Minister of the Interior), Zafer Çağlayan (Minister of Economy), and Erdoğan Bayraktar (Minister of Environment and Urban Planning) were implicated, as well as Mustafa Demir, the mayor of the district municipality of Fatih; the real estate businessman Ali Ağaoğlu; Süleyman Aslan, the general manager of Halkbank and the Iranian businessman Reza Zarrab who was considered as the key suspect in the investigation and was reportedly involved in a money laundering scheme particularly regarding his transfer of gold and money to Iran via Turkey's government-controlled Halkbank as part of a strategy to bypass United States-led sanctions on Iran. Demir was detained on accusations of approving the construction license for a hotel near the route of the recently inaugurated Marmaray railway, despite warnings from Japanese engineers that the construction could put the tunnel at risk of collapsing. Demir was investigated for ordering the ministry report to be shelved in exchange for bribes.

Moreover, Egemen Bağış, the Minister of European Union Affairs, is cited in newspaper articles as a potential suspect of bribery related to Reza Zarrab who has business affiliations with Babak Zanjani. As part of corruption claims along with 3 other ministers, Bağış was the only one out of the four charged ministers who had not resigned on 25 December 2013. Prime Minister Erdoğan announced a major cabinet reshuffle, removing Bağış from his post as the Minister for European Union through his publicly unannounced official resignation.

The police confiscated some US$17.5 million as money used in bribery during the investigation; US$4.5 million was found at Süleyman Aslan's residence and US$750,000 at Barış Güler's. Prosecutors accused 14 people including Barış Güler, Kaan Çağlayan, Süleyman Aslan and Reza Zarrab of bribery, corruption, fraud, money laundering and smuggling gold. On 21 December, the court ordered the arrest of these 14 people.

In total, 91 people were detained in the investigation; 26 of them were arrested by the court.

=== Second wave ===
Several newspapers reported that a new investigation was expected on 26 December 2013, possibly involving then-Prime Minister (now President of Turkey) Erdoğan's sons, Bilal Erdoğan and Burak, as well as certain Al-Qaeda affiliates from Saudi Arabia such as Sheikh Yaseen Al Qadi and Osama Khoutub. The police officers in Istanbul Security Directorate, newly appointed by the government just a few days previously, refused to carry out their orders, and the deputy director of Public Prosecutions did not approve this new operation. The man behind this second investigation, Prosecutor Muammer Akkaş, was dismissed on the same day. Akkaş said he was prevented from performing his duty.

A second wave of arrests was planned, and a list was leaked to the press.

At midnight on 7 January, a government decree was published removing 350 police officers from their positions, including the chiefs of the units dealing with financial crimes, smuggling and organised crime. Fethullah Gülen described the decree as a purge of civil servants, while then-Prime Minister Erdoğan (now President of Turkey) described the corruption investigation as a "judicial coup" by those jealous of his success, backed by foreigners, namely a "dirty plot" of the Gülen movement.

== Government reaction ==
Since the beginning of the investigation, the Justice and Development Party (AKP) government has started a purge in the police force; sacking dozens of police chiefs, most notably Hüseyin Çapkın, the Chief of Police in Istanbul. The Ministry of the Interior and the Ministry of Justice also changed their regulations, forcing security forces to inform their seniors of their actions at all times. This received criticism from the Union of Turkish Bar Associations, who are taking the case to the Turkish Council of State. The Turkish Council of State overturned the change of these regulations on 27 December, much to the disappointment of Prime Minister Erdoğan.

Various opposition sources accused the government of trying to influence the judiciary system and covering up the corruption. Among them was the Nationalist Movement Party MP Oktay Vural. A heated controversy erupted after the release on YouTube of audio recordings in which Erdoğan was reportedly heard telling his son, Bilal, to urgently get rid of tens of millions of dollars. Erdoğan has claimed the recordings were faked but some experts disagreed with this claim.

In late December, Hurriyet and Yeni Safak papers published comments by Erdoğan stating he believes he is the ultimate target of a corruption and bribery probe of his allies. The Turkish Prime Minister told journalists that anyone attempting to enmesh him in the scandal would be "left empty handed." Erdoğan reshuffled his Cabinet on 25 Dec, replacing 10 ministers hours after three ministers, whose sons were detained in relation to the probe, resigned. One of those ministers called on Erdoğan to also step down. The ministers’ sons were questioned over the scandal focusing on alleged illicit money transfers to Iran and bribery for construction projects. Two of them were later arrested on bribery charges.

According to Hüseyin Çelik, who is serving as government spokesman, the four ministers who are involved in the investigation offered their resignation to the Prime Minister Erdoğan on 22 December.

Erdoğan blamed the investigation on an international conspiracy and vowed revenge on the Islamic community of the preacher Fethullah Gülen. There had been an antagonism between Erdoğan and Gülen for some time: Hakan Şükür, who is often regarded as a disciple of Gülen, had resigned his post in Justice and Development Party on 16 December. Government officials accused Gülen and his followers of treason and started referring to them as "terrorists."

Erdoğan defended Halkbank chief executive Süleyman Aslan, describing him as "honest person". Aslan was charged with taking bribes by the prosecutors while the police are said to reportedly have found US$4.5 million in cash stored in shoe boxes in Aslan's home. After Aslan was arrested the bank's stock went down 32% for the year. Erdoğan also threatened Francis Ricciardone, the U.S. ambassador to Turkey, with expulsion.

Erdoğan left the country for an official visit to Pakistan on 23 December, while the scandal was dominating the headlines.

Muhammed Mısır, a bureaucrat in the Ministry of Health, resigned after bribery allegations on 24 December.

Muammer Güler (Minister of the Interior) and Zafer Çağlayan (Minister of Economy), both of whose sons were arrested in the anti-corruption operation, resigned together on the morning of 25 December. That same afternoon, Erdoğan Bayraktar (Minister of Environment and Urban Planning) resigned both as minister and as a member of parliament. Bayraktar said that he did not take kindly to having been forced into resignation, and that Prime Minister Recep Tayyip Erdoğan should resign as well, claiming that he had done everything with the Prime Minister's approval.

İdris Naim Şahin, former Minister of the Interior, has resigned from Justice and Development Party on 25 December. He said the government's crackdown on the police organization and the judiciary system could not be explained with reason or the notions of law and justice.

450 policemen in the Financial Crimes department were forbidden to enter the Istanbul Security Department HQ.

Erdal Kalkan, a member of parliament in the constituency of İzmir from the ruling AKP, resigned from his party on 26 December because of the ongoing scandal. Haluk Özdalga, Member of Parliament in the constituency of Ankara, resigned from AKP for the same reason. Ertuğrul Günay, another MP in the constituency of İzmir and former Minister of Culture, was the third one to resign from AKP. These three ex-members of AKP were each separately had been on investigation by AKP's internal discipline committee with the accusation of opposing AKP's own regulations. They all resigned before the committee reached a verdict.

On 31 December, Burdur deputy Hasan Hami Yıldırım resigned from the AKP, reducing the number of AKP parliamentarians to 320. Yıldırım accused the government of obstructing the investigation into the scandal. He also criticized the campaign of “insults” and “defamation” against Islamic scholar Fethullah Gülen and his Hizmet movement, which he considered an attempt to "eradicate a civil society movement.”

Erdoğan's government dismissed or reassigned thousands of police officers and hundreds of judges and prosecutors - including those leading the investigation - and passed a law increasing government control of the judiciary.

=== Cabinet reshuffle ===
In a speech to the press on the evening of 25 December, Prime Minister Recep Tayyip Erdoğan announced the reshuffle of 10 members of his cabinet in light of the scandal, saying that the reshuffle was to replace the three ministers who had resigned earlier in the day and others who were planning mayoral runs in the local elections in March 2014. This included the removal of Minister for European Union and Chief Negotiator Egemen Bağış, another figure in the scandal, from office. The changes to the cabinet are:

- Emrullah İşler – Deputy Prime Minister – replacing Bekir Bozdağ (see below entry)
- Bekir Bozdağ – Minister of Justice – replacing Sadullah Ergin
- Ayşenur İslam – Minister of Family and Social Policy – replacing Fatma Şahin
- Nihat Zeybekci – Minister of Economic Affairs – replacing Zafer Çağlayan (who resigned)
- İdris Güllüce – Minister of Environment and Urban Planning – replacing Erdoğan Bayraktar (who resigned)
- Akif Çağatay Kılıç – Minister of Youth and Sports – replacing Suat Kılıç
- Efkan Ala – Minister of the Interior – replacing Muammer Güler (who resigned)
- Lütfi Elvan – Minister of Transport and Communication – replacing Binali Yıldırım
- Fikri Işık – Minister of Science, Industry and Technology – replacing Nihat Ergün
- Mevlüt Çavuşoğlu – Minister for European Union Affairs – replacing Egemen Bağış

== Other controversies ==
On 24 December, another video began to circulate that shows Ali Erdoğan, nephew and bodyguard of Prime Minister Erdoğan, instructing a police commissioner to abuse the detainees who had protested his uncle and hurling insults at him when he refuses.

On 23 December, 35-year-old Hakan Yüksekdağ, a police commissioner in the Smuggling and Battle Against Organized Crimes Department of the Ankara Province Security Directory, was found dead in his car. His relatives dispute the official claim that Yüksekdağ committed suicide.

On 24 December, Abdi Altınok, an Assistant Chief of Police in the Isparta Province Security Directory, committed suicide.

Billionaire Babak Zanjani, an alleged partner and accomplice of Reza Zarrab, was arrested in Iran on 30 December.

== United States prosecution ==
Reza Zarrab, the businessman at the centre of the 2013 investigation, later became the defendant in a separate prosecution in the United States that continued for more than a decade after Turkey's own case was dismissed.

=== Zarrab's arrest and guilty plea ===
Zarrab was indicted in the United States in 2015. He was arrested in Florida in March 2016 while on a family trip to Disney World and was later moved to New York to face a six-count indictment, which included charges of conspiracy to defraud the United States, conspiracy to commit bank fraud and conspiracy to commit international money laundering. After initially pleading not guilty, he changed his plea and, on 26 October 2017, pleaded guilty to conspiracy, bank fraud and money laundering charges connected to a scheme to evade U.S. sanctions on Iran. Several co-defendants, including Halkbank's former general manager Süleyman Aslan and former Economy Minister Zafer Çağlayan, remained at large.

=== Trial of Mehmet Hakan Atilla ===
Zarrab testified for seven days for the prosecution against Mehmet Hakan Atilla, a deputy general manager at Halkbank, describing how Iranian oil revenue held in restricted accounts at the bank was moved through gold trades and fictitious food transactions. He also testified that he had paid more than $50 million in bribes to a Turkish minister in 2012 and said he believed Erdoğan was aware of the scheme. Turkish officials rejected the case as politically motivated; Erdoğan described it as an American conspiracy against Turkey.

On 3 January 2018, after a four-week trial, a jury convicted Atilla on five of six counts, including conspiracy to defraud the United States and bank fraud. He was sentenced to 32 months in prison and returned to Turkey in 2019 after completing his sentence.

=== Halkbank prosecution and outcome ===
In 2019, Halkbank itself was charged in a six-count indictment alleging fraud, money laundering and sanctions offenses. U.S. prosecutors alleged that the bank had secretly transferred about $20 billion in restricted Iranian funds, converting oil revenue into gold and cash and using fake food shipments to disguise the transfers, with at least $1 billion passing through the U.S. financial system. The bank pleaded not guilty and denied wrongdoing.

In 2026, the criminal case against Halkbank was dismissed under an agreement between the bank and the administration of President Donald Trump. Less than a month later, Zarrab was sentenced by Judge Richard M. Berman. Prosecutors described his cooperation as substantial and reliable, and he received no additional prison term; his lawyers said he had spent 22 months in jail. In a sentencing filing, Zarrab's lawyers also said that his family's assets in Turkey had been seized in retaliation for his cooperation.

== See also ==
- 2013–14 protests in Turkey
- Corruption in Turkey
- Ergenekon trials
- Politics of Turkey
- Justice and Development Party
- Council of Judges and Prosecutors
- McCarthyism
- U.S. v Zarrab
- 2026 Turkish investment fund scandal

== Police officers involved ==
The investigations were carried out by officers from the Financial Crimes Branch of the Istanbul Police Department.

According to public prosecutor Celal Kara, who was involved in the 17 December investigation, the officers who carried out the operation included branch head Yakub Saygılı, deputy branch heads Kazım Aksoy and Yasin Topçu, bureau chief Mehmet Akif Üner, and police officers Hüseyin Korkmaz and Savaş Akyol.

The 25 December investigation was also carried out by personnel from the same branch. Saygılı, Aksoy, Topçu and Mahir Çakallı were among the senior police officials involved in the investigation. Other officers later prosecuted in connection with the 25 December case included Arif İbiş, Mustafa Demirhan, Mehmet Habip Kunt, İbrahim Şener, Mehmet Fatih Yiğit and Mehmet Akif Üner.

Following the operations, several officers involved were dismissed from their posts, detained or prosecuted in connection with the investigations. In 2018, the Istanbul 13th High Criminal Court convicted Saygılı, Aksoy, Topçu, Çakallı, İbiş, Demirhan, Kunt, Şener, Yiğit and Üner in the 25 December case. The verdicts were subsequently reviewed in appellate proceedings and by the Court of Cassation.
