= Adem Yavuz Arslan =

Turkish journalist, writer and television programmer (born 1972)

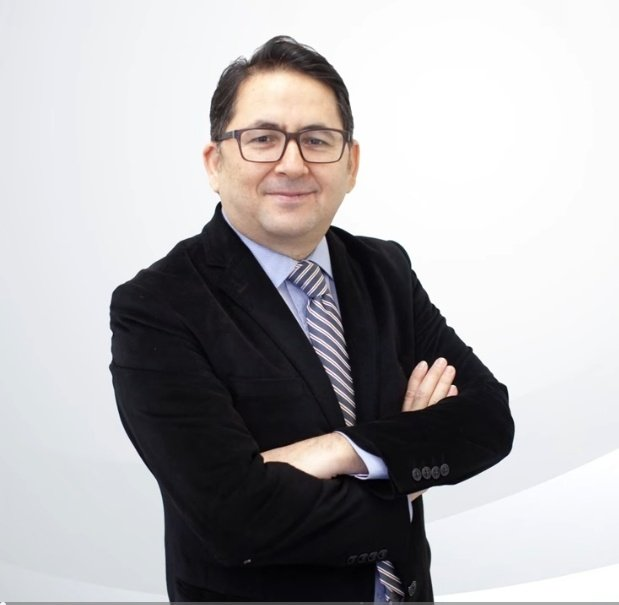
- Adem Y. Arslan in 2025
- Born: 1972 (age 53–54); Silifke, Mersin, Turkey
- Education: Ege University (Faculty of Communication)
- Occupations: Journalist, writer, commentator
- Employers: Newspapers worked for: Aksiyon; Bugün; TV Channels worked for: Bugün TV (2008–2015); Digital Media: Adem Yavuz Arslan 's YouTube channel (2018–present); Tr724-TV (2016–present)
- Known for: Investigative journalism on the Hrant Dink murder, deep state operations, and criticism of the Erdogan government
- Awards: Metin Göktepe Journalism Award (2000); Contemporary Journalists Association Best News Photo Award
- Website: Official website (Archived)

Adem Yavuz Arslan (born 1972, Silifke) is a Turkish investigative journalist, writer and television programmer. He is known for his work on the Hrant Dink murder case, deep state operations in Turkey, and his critical reporting on the government of President Recep Tayyip Erdoğan. In May 2014, while serving as Ankara representative for the daily Bugün, he was appointed the newspaper's Washington, D.C. bureau chief and moved to the United States. Following the 15 July 2016 coup attempt, the closure of Bugün and criminal investigations against him over alleged links to the Gülen movement, he remained in the United States and has lived there in exile.

== Life and education ==
Adem Yavuz Arslan was born in the Silifke district of Mersin. He completed his primary, secondary, and high school education in Silifke. He received his undergraduate degree from the Faculty of Communication at Ege University.

== Career ==
Arslan began his journalism career as a police and court reporter in İzmir. In 1998, he moved to Istanbul and joined the staff of Aksiyon news magazine. Following his tenure at Aksiyon, he moved to the Bugün newspaper, where he served as the Ankara representative before being posted to Washington, D.C. as the paper's bureau chief. Throughout his career, Arslan also worked as a photojournalist and war correspondent

Arslan covered the Second Gulf War from Northern Iraq and Baghdad in 2003. He reported from Pakistan, documenting the activities of Turkish schools and medical missions in Afghan refugee camps. He reported from conflict zones such as Bosnia, Kosovo and Iraq.

=== Notable Works ===
==== Hrant Dink Assassination Investigation ====
In 2011, Arslan published "An Armenian: The Hrant Dink Operation Codes", a book investigating the 2007 assassination of Turkish-Armenian journalist Hrant Dink. The book revealed new information about the murder, including the proximity of a non-commissioned officer to the triggerman on the day of the killing. Following the book's publication, Arslan received repeated death threats, including a parcel sent to his office containing Kalashnikov bullets and a white beret.

==== Reporting on the Reza Zarrab case ====
Adem Yavuz Arslan conducted significant reporting on the international Reza Zarrab scandal, a major scheme to evade U.S. sanctions on Iran that involved high-level Turkish government officials and the state-owned Halkbank.

In his 2024 investigation for Politurco, Arslan revealed that Reza Zarrab was living under the new identity of "Aaron Goldsmith" in Florida and building a luxury yacht, despite being a key figure in a sanctions evasion case involving billions of dollars. This reporting came years after Zarrab's cooperation with U.S. authorities in the trial of Halkbank executive Mehmet Hakan Atilla.

Arslan's work on the Zarrab case was part of his broader investigative focus on corruption involving the Turkish government.

==== 15 July Investigations ====
External videos
- Adem Yavuz Arslan's July 15 investigative video
- The whole July 15 story from the beginning. MIT recorded it 6 months ago

Arslan conducted extensive investigative reporting on the events surrounding the 2016 Turkish coup d'état attempt. His analyses focused on inconsistencies in the official narrative, intelligence activities preceding the coup night, and the role of state institutions. Through his reporting, Arslan argued that several critical details related to the timeline, military deployments, and early intelligence warnings were obscured or misrepresented by Turkish authorities.

=== Government Pressure and Exile ===
Arslan was among the journalists prosecuted by the Turkish government following the 2016 coup attempt. His reporting on this sensitive subject contributed to his facing legal pressure and eventual exile from Turkey. His passport was revoked, and an INTERPOL Red Notice was issued at Turkey's request. Arslan is being tried in absentia with prosecutors seeking a life sentence based on his books and articles.

During the "Freedom Convention Turkey 2025" held at the National Press Club in Washington, D.C., Arslan spoke about the personal toll of his exile and the impact of transnational repression. He described the humanitarian difficulties of his period in the U.S., stating that he had to work as an Uber driver to support himself. He also shared a personal account of the emotional challenges of exile, noting that he was unable to return to Turkey for his father's funeral and had to witness the ceremony via FaceTime.

== Context of Press Freedom in Turkey ==
Turkey ranks 159th out of 180 countries in the 2025 World Press Freedom Index, categorized as having "very serious" media freedom violations. Over 90% of Turkish media is under government control, with critical journalists facing prosecution, censorship, and exile.

External videos
- The interview journalist Adem Yavuz Arslan conducted with Korkmaz regarding the December 17 investigation. (YouTube)

Arslan published on his YouTube channel an interview he had conducted shortly before the death of Hüseyin Korkmaz, a former deputy commissioner who had served in the 17 December 2013 corruption and bribery investigation. Presented as Korkmaz's first and only in-depth interview, the conversation covered the 17 December investigation, his imprisonment, his relocation to the United States, and his testimony in the Halkbank trial.

== Current Work in Exile ==
Based in Washington D.C., Arslan continues his journalistic work through digital platforms. He publishes analytical articles on Turkish politics for outlets including Turkish Minute, Politurco.com and TR724. He produces content for his YouTube channel and maintains an active presence on social media platform X (formerly Twitter), reaching hundreds of thousands of followers.

== Awards ==
Arslan won the Metin Göktepe Journalism Award in 2000 for his investigation "Beware, They Are Stealing Our DNA!" revealing the gendarmerie's secret DNA bank.

== Publications ==
- An Armenian – (Bi Ermeni Var) (2011) – Investigation into the Hrant Dink assassination
- Ergenekon summit: How minorities became targets, from Dink to Malatya (2012) – Examination of attacks on minorities in Turkey
- A Murder by State – Analysis of missionary activities, provocations and intelligence-mafia relations
- Collapse of Turkey – (Çöküş) – Research on the July 15, 2016 coup attempt

== See also ==
- Press freedom in Turkey
- Journalism in Turkey
