= Turkiye Halk Bankasi A.S. v. United States =

- Supreme Court of the United States

Argued January 17, 2023 Decided April 19, 2023
- Full case name: Turkiye Halk Bankasi A.S. v. United States of America
- Docket no.: 21-1450
- Argument: Oral argument
- Opinion announcement: Opinion announcement

Questions presented
- Whether U.S. district courts may exercise subject-matter jurisdiction over criminal prosecutions against foreign sovereigns and their instrumentalities under 18 U.S.C. § 3231 and in light of the Foreign Sovereign Immunities Act, 28 U.S.C. §§ 1330, 1441(d), 1602-1611.

Holding
- The Foreign Sovereign Immunities Act's comprehensive scheme governing claims of sovereign immunity in civil actions against foreign states and their instrumentalities does not cover criminal cases.

Court membership
- Chief Justice John Roberts Associate Justices Clarence Thomas · Samuel Alito; Sonia Sotomayor · Elena Kagan; Neil Gorsuch · Brett Kavanaugh; Amy Coney Barrett · Ketanji Brown Jackson

Case opinions
- Majority: Kavanaugh, joined by Roberts, Thomas, Sotomayor, Kagan, Barrett, Jackson
- Concur/dissent: Gorsuch, joined by Alito

Laws applied
- Foreign Sovereign Immunities Act of 1976

Turkiye Halk Bankasi A.S. v. United States, 598 U.S. 264 (2023), was a United States Supreme Court case in which the court held that the Foreign Sovereign Immunities Act's comprehensive scheme governing claims of sovereign immunity in civil actions against foreign states and their instrumentalities does not cover criminal cases. The case concerned the exposure of Turkish state-owned bank Halkbank to prosecution by the Department of Justice.

== Background ==
After an October 2021 ruling by judges José A. Cabranes, Joseph F. Bianco, and Amalya Kearse of the United States Court of Appeals for the Second Circuit, the Supreme Court granted certiorari, asking "[w]hether U.S. district courts may exercise subject-matter jurisdiction over criminal prosecutions against foreign sovereigns and their instrumentalities under 18 U.S.C. ... and in light of the Foreign Sovereign Immunities Act".

The governments of Azerbaijan, Pakistan, and Turkey filed amicus briefs in support of Halkbank. Professor Chimene Keitner and Mark B. Feldman filed an amicus brief supporting the government.

== Argument ==
Oral argument took place on January 17, 2023. Lisa Blatt argued on behalf of Halkbank. On April 19, 2023, the Supreme Court affirmed the Second Circuit.

== See also ==
- 2013 corruption scandal in Turkey
- United States v. Atilla
