= Mustafa Elitaş =

Turkish politician (born 1957)

Mustafa Elitaş MP
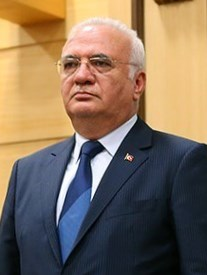

Minister of the Economy
- In office 24 November 2015 – 24 May 2016
- Prime Minister: Ahmet Davutoğlu
- Preceded by: Nihat Zeybekci
- Succeeded by: Nihat Zeybekci

Member of the Grand National Assembly
- In office 17 November 2015 – 14 May 2023
- Constituency: Kayseri (Nov 2015, 2018)
- In office 14 November 2002 – 23 April 2015
- Constituency: Kayseri (2002, 2007, 2011)

Personal details
- Born: 5 January 1957 (age 69) Kayseri, Turkey
- Party: Justice and Development Party (AKP)
- Education: Ankara University
- Profession: Politician, economist
- Cabinet: 64th

Mustafa Elitaş (5 January 1957, Kayseri) is a Turkish politician who served as the Economy Minister of Turkey from 24 November 2015 to 24 November 2016.

Elitaş graduated from the Department of Economics and Public Finance of Ankara University in 1981. He served as a Member of Parliament for the electoral district of Kayseri between November 2015 and May 2023, having previously served between 2002 and April 2015. He was appointed as the new Economy Minister for the Republic of Turkey on 24 November 2015 by Prime Minister Ahmet Davutoğlu.
