= Kadir Bal =

Turkish bureaucrat

Deputy Undersecretary of the Ministry of Economy
- In office April 2017 – April 2020

Personal details
- Born: 11 January 1966 (age 60) Yahyalı, Kayseri, Turkey
- Education: Middle East Technical University; University of Ottawa
- Profession: Bureaucrat, Diplomat, Engineer

Kadir Bal (born 11 January 1966) is a Turkish bureaucrat, diplomat, and engineer. He is currently a Board Member at SASA Polyester Sanayi A.Ş., and was previously the Deputy Undersecretary at the Ministry of the Economy of the Republic of Turkey.

== Early life and education ==
Kadir Bal was born to Osman and Asiye Bal as the youngest of four children in the town of Yahyali in Kayseri on 11 January 1966. The male head of the Bal family, Osman, previously worked as a rural taxi driver, and currently owns a glassware store, where Kadir helped his family by working in their store and shining shoes in his youth.

After graduating as a mechanical engineer from Middle East Technical University in 1989, he received his Master of Business Administration from the University of Ottawa in 2000.

== Career ==
Bal entered the Ministry of Economy, then the Undersecretariat of Treasury and Foreign Trade in 1991, and served as a foreign trade expert until 1997, when he served as Deputy Commercial Counsellor in the Embassy of Turkey, Ottawa until 2000. After serving as Head of Department in the General Directorate of Imports, he served as Deputy General Director of Imports until 2008, where he served as Chief Commercial Counsellor in the Embassy of Turkey, Washington, D.C. for four years. After briefly serving as Acting General Director of Agreements and as General Director of Imports, he was the Deputy Undersecretary of the Ministry of Economy of the Republic of Turkey from April 2017 until his retirement from public service in April 2020. He is currently an Executive Board Member at SASA Polyester A.Ş., a producer of polyester staple fibers, filament yarns, polyester-based and specialty polymers and intermediates.

== Personal life ==
Bal speaks Turkish and English fluently, and currently resides in Ankara. He is married to Nur Ayferi, and has two children: Mustafa and Ayşe Rana.
