= List of mayors of Denizli =

This is a list of mayors of Denizli, Turkey.

Period	Years	Mayor	Status of Denizli
Governors as mayors	1923-1924	Feyzullahoğlu Ahmet Hamdi Efendi	Province center
Governors as mayors	1924-1925	Tatosmanoğlu Emin Efendi	Province center
Governors as mayors	1925-1927	S.A. Zade Hacı Tevfik Bey	Province center
Governors as mayors	1927-1929	Saraçoğlu Ragıp Bey	Province center
Governors as mayors	1929-1931	Esat Berkman	Province center
Governors as mayors	1931-1938	Naili Küçüka	Province center
Governors as mayors	1938-1941	İsmail Cilov	Province center
Governors as mayors	1941-1944	Esat Kaymakçı	Province center
Governors as mayors	1944-1950	Hüsnü Örnek	Province center
Governors as mayors	1950-1957	Ali Rıza Turan Bahadır	Province center
Governors as mayors	1957-1960	Ferit Ali Küçüka	Province center
Military rule	1960	Ulvi Vural	Province center
Military rule	1960	Ekrem Talat Avşaroğlu	Province center
Military rule	1961-1963	Lütfi Uraz	Province center
Elected mayors	1963-1968	Mehmet Candoğan	Province center
Elected mayors	1968-1973	Ali Dartanel	Province center
Elected mayors	1973-1980	Hasan Gönüllü	Province center
Military rule	1980-1981	Nihat Yalaz	Province center
Military rule	1981-1983	Ahmet Acar	Province center
Elected mayors	1984-1989	Ziya Tıkıroğlu	Province center
Elected mayors	1989-1999	Ali Marım	Province center
Elected mayors	1999-2004	Ali Aygören	Province center
Elected mayors	2004-2011	Nihat Zeybekci	Province center
Elected mayors	2011-2014	Osman Zolan	Province center
Elected mayors	2014-2024	Osman Zolan	Metropolitan center
Elected mayors	2024-present	Bülent Nuri Çavuşoğlu	Metropolitan center
