= Osman Zolan =

Turkish politician and lawyer

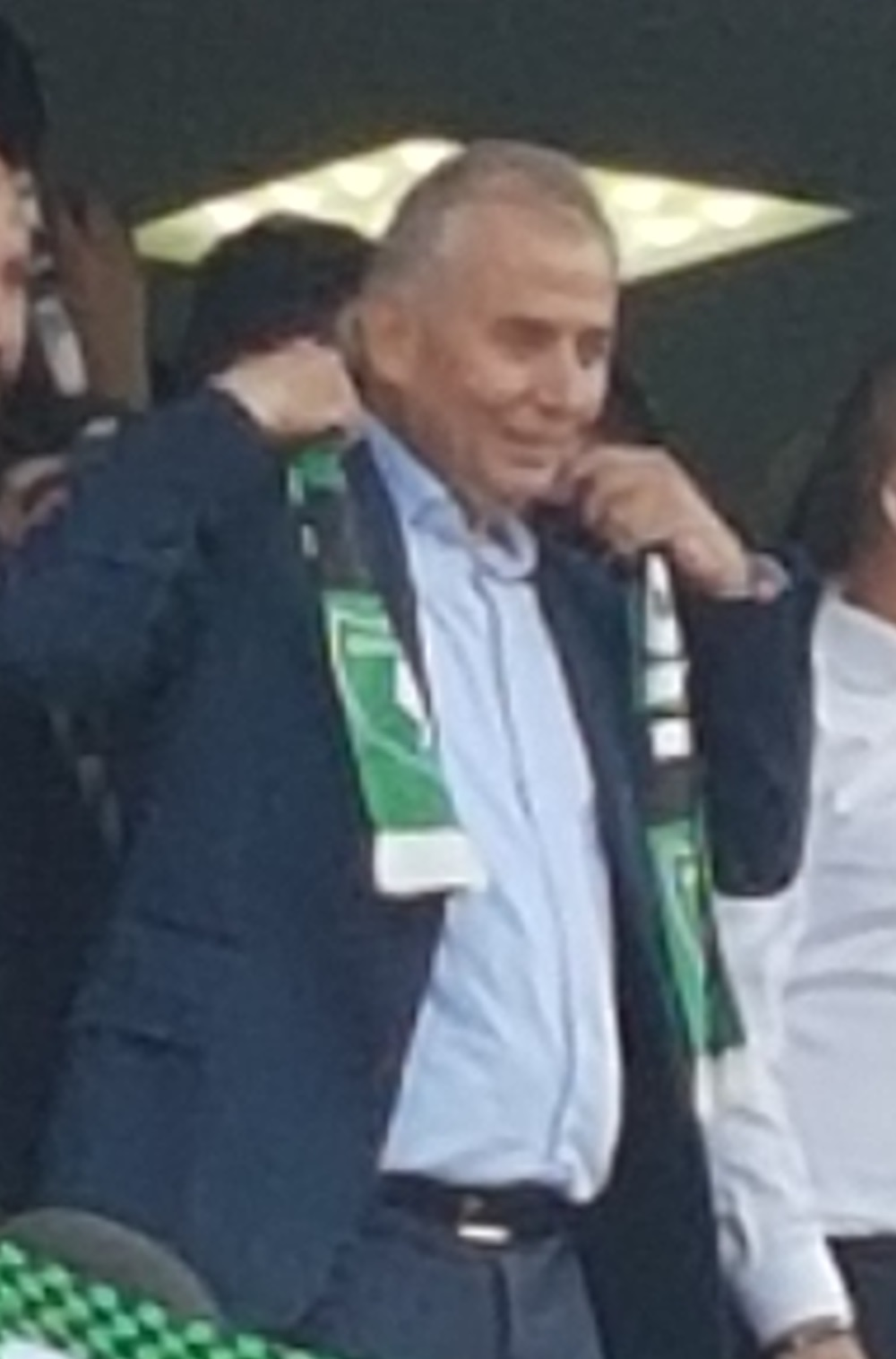

24th Mayor of Denizli
- In office 16 March 2011 – 31 March 2024
- Preceded by: Nihat Zeybekci
- Succeeded by: Bülent Nuri Çavuşoğlu

Personal details
- Born: 10 December 1964 (age 61) Tavas, Denizli, Turkey
- Party: Justice and Development Party
- Education: Dokuz Eylül University Faculty of Law

Osman Zolan (born 10 December 1964, Tavas) is a Turkish politician and lawyer who served as the mayor of Denizli Metropolitan Municipality of Turkey from 2011 to 2024.

On 10 March 2011, Nihat Zeybekci resigned to run for a seat in the parliament. Then Zolan took it over from him. He was nominated as a candidate for 2014 Turkish local elections. After the elections, he was elected mayor of Denizli Metropolitan Municipality.

Political offices
Preceded by Nihat Zeybekci	Mayor of Denizli; 16 March 2011 – 31 March 2024	Succeeded by Bülent Nuri Çavuşoğlu
