= Kevin Duffy =

American judge (1933–2020)

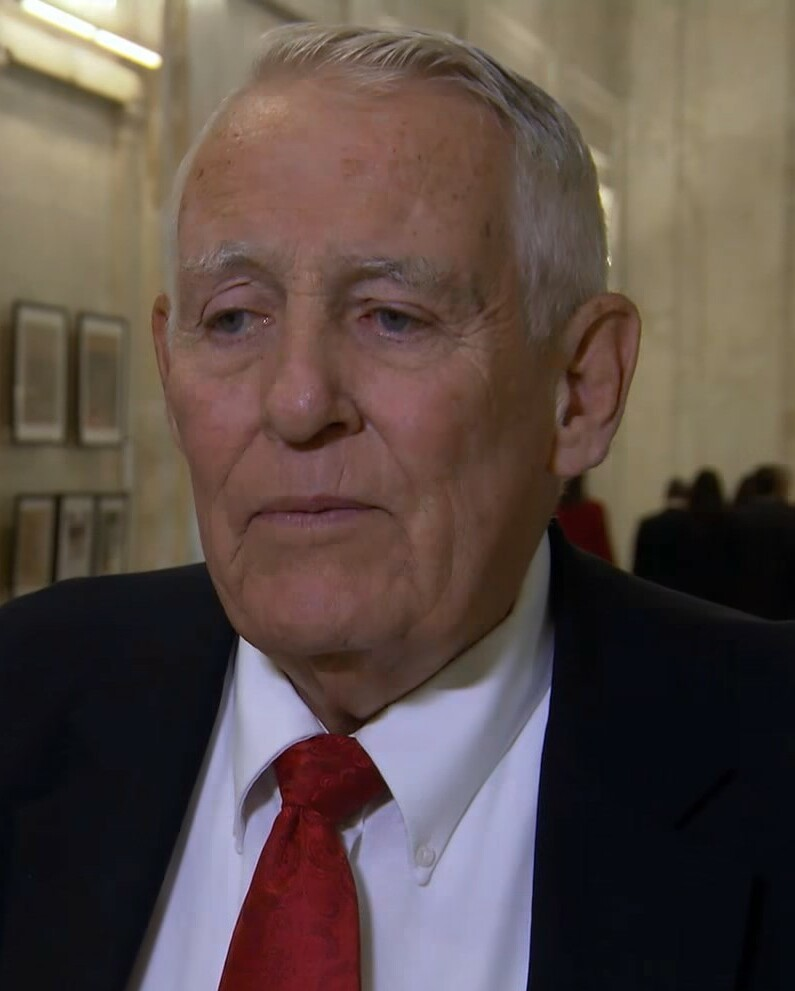
- Duffy in 2014

Senior Judge of the United States District Court for the Southern District of New York
- In office January 10, 1998 – September 30, 2016

Judge of the United States District Court for the Southern District of New York
- In office October 17, 1972 – January 10, 1998
- Appointed by: Richard Nixon
- Preceded by: Irving Ben Cooper
- Succeeded by: Richard M. Berman

Personal details
- Born: Kevin Thomas Duffy; January 10, 1933 New York City, U.S.
- Died: April 1, 2020 (aged 87) Greenwich, Connecticut, U.S.
- Cause of death: COVID-19
- Spouse: Irene Krumeich (m. 1957)
- Children: 4
- Education: Fordham University (A.B.); Fordham University School of Law (LL.B.)

Kevin Thomas Duffy (January 10, 1933 – April 1, 2020) was an American lawyer and United States district judge of the United States District Court for the Southern District of New York.

== Education and career ==
Born on January 10, 1933, in the Bronx, Duffy received a bachelor's degree from Fordham University in 1954 and a Bachelor of Laws from the Fordham University School of Law in 1958. He clerked for Judge J. Edward Lumbard at the United States Court of Appeals for the Second Circuit (1955–1958). Duffy served as an Assistant United States Attorney (1958–1959) and assistant chief of the Criminal Division (1959–1961) at the office of the United States Attorney for the Southern District of New York before going into private practice as an associate with the New York City firm Whitman, Ransom & Coulson (1961–1966). He later became a partner with Gordon & Gordon (1966–1969). Duffy was later appointed New York regional administrator of the Securities and Exchange Commission office (1969–1972). His tenure as Regional Administrator of the United States Securities and Exchange Commission was in a time of turmoil in Wall Street. He is viewed by many as having been the first proponent within the Commission of what eventually became Securities Investor Protection Corporation or SIPC.

== Federal judicial service ==
On September 25, 1972, Duffy was nominated by President Richard Nixon to a seat on the United States District Court for the Southern District of New York vacated by Judge Irving Ben Cooper. Duffy was confirmed by the United States Senate on October 12, 1972, and received his commission on October 17, 1972. At that time, he became the youngest member of the federal judiciary. He assumed senior status on January 10, 1998. He retired from active service on September 30, 2016.

=== Notable cases ===
In 1973, as a new member of the Southern District, Duffy was assigned one of the most complicated and difficult organized crime narcotics cases tried in Manhattan federal court, United States v. Tramunti. Carmine Tramunti and thirty others were charged with conspiracy to violate the federal narcotics laws in connection with many sales of heroin. Several defendants pleaded guilty; some cooperated and testified; three became fugitives prior to trial; one was murdered before trial; another, who was on bail, fell down a flight of stairs and fractured his skull during the trial; and, an attorney for another of the defendants died suddenly during the trial. "Through it all, the young and relatively inexperienced Judge Duffy presided with poise, calm and good grace."

In 1977, Duffy threatened New York Governor Hugh Carey with contempt of court for not imposing bridge tolls as Duffy had required him to under the Clean Air Act of 1963.

In 1983, Duffy presided over one of the trials resulting from the Brink's robbery (1981) by the Black Liberation Army.

In 1985, Duffy began a complicated multi-defendant trial involving the then-alleged leader and other members of the Gambino organized crime family. In a pre-trial decision, he severed many defendants in the case, pointing out that if the trial were held on the original indictment, the case would have been too unwieldy and cumbersome and would have lasted more than a year. Even with the severance, the Castellano trial was a difficult case to manage and on December 16, 1985, Paul Castellano, the alleged Gambino leader, and his bodyguard were gunned down outside of Sparks Steak House on East Forty-Sixth Street in Manhattan.

Duffy also presided over the trial and conviction of the four principal perpetrators of the 1993 World Trade Center bombing. In a book about the trial, "Defending Mohammad: Justice on Trial," Robert E. Precht, a defense attorney for Mohammad Salameh (who rented the yellow Ryder van that carried the explosives), accused Duffy of bias and of "essentially convicting his client before the trial ended." Other defense lawyers have applauded the Judge's fair handling of the case and after the trial, the New York Post ran a headline calling him the "Avenger."

Duffy presided over the trial of Ramzi Yousef, the mastermind of the Bojinka plot (the Manila Bombing Conspiracy), to hijack planes bound for the west coast of the United States and fly them into the Pacific Ocean on a coordinated schedule. In the words of the Second Circuit, "Judge Duffy carefully, impartially, and commendably conducted the two lengthy and extraordinarily complex trials from which these appeals were taken. The fairness of the proceedings over which he presided is beyond doubt." United States v. Yousef, 327 F.3d 56, 173 (2d Cir. 2003).

Duffy's work on the civil side included difficult litigations, including presiding over the Iranian Assets Litigation, which followed from the attachment of Iranian government assets following the taking of American hostages. He also presided over the tender offer battle in which Gulf & Western Industries, Inc. made a hostile tender offer for A&P.

Duffy presided over the copyright case Grand Upright Music, Ltd. v. Warner Bros. Records Inc. 780 F. Supp. 182 (S.D.N.Y. 1991), in which Warner was sued over the use of the sampling of Raymond "Gilbert" O'Sullivan's "Alone Again (Naturally)" by rapper Biz Markie in his song "Alone Again". Duffy has been criticized for his opinion in Grand Upright v. Warner, partly because Duffy begins his opinion with the biblical admonition – "thou shalt not steal" and later referred the defendant to the U.S. Attorney suggesting criminal charges. According to The Copyright Infringement Project of UCLA Law and Columbia Law School, Judge Duffy's opinion in Grand Upright v. Warner is "an iffy understanding on the part of this judge of the facts and issues before him in this case."

Duffy ruled on post-trial motions of the defendant Wadih El-Hage (bin Laden's personal secretary) who had been convicted of conspiracy to kill Americans. El-Hage was jointly tried with those who coordinated bombings of U.S. Embassies in East Africa and later moved for a new trial asserting that the Government's failure to make timely disclosure of the videotapes and transcripts of twenty-eight hours of interviews between prosecutors, FBI agents and a government witness. In an opinion spanning 54 pages of the Federal Supplement, Judge Duffy denied a motion for a new trial, after an evidentiary hearing. United States . v. Bin Laden, 397 F.Supp.2d 465 (S.D.N.Y. 2005). The Second Circuit affirmed "for the reasons stated by the District Court in its comprehensive Memorandum & Order. . . ." In re Terrorist Bombings of U.S. Embassies in East Africa, 2011 WL 222386 (2d Cir. January 26, 2011).

Duffy sat by designation on the United States Court of Appeals for the Ninth Circuit. He has authored multiple majority published opinions for that court.

=== Assessments ===
According to The Almanac of the Federal Judiciary (2004), lawyers who appeared before Duffy described him as an unpleasant and difficult judge to appear before, quoting one lawyer as stating: "He's mercurial. He can be a brute." Others, however, note that "during his twenty years as a member of the federal judiciary, Judge Duffy has impressed litigants, lawyers, jurors, and his colleagues as a jurist of rare legal acumen who gets right to the core of a case, a human being of unusual common sense, humor and humility." According to The Copyright Infringement Project of UCLA Law and Columbia Law School, Duffy is "one of the most often reversed judges in the Second Circuit, he was rebuked by a Circuit panel in 1996 for mistreatment of a lawyer appearing before him."

== Other activities ==
Duffy served as an adjunct professor for several different universities, including Brooklyn Law School (1975–1980, securities), York University Law School (1983–1984, trial advocacy), Pace University School of Law (1984–1986, trial advocacy), and Fordham University School of Law (1993–2020, trial advocacy).

== Personal life and death ==
Duffy lived in Greenwich, Connecticut and Southampton, New York at the time of his death. He and his wife, Irene, had four children. Because of his work in presiding over terrorism cases, Duffy was under security protection by the United States Marshal Service for ten years.

Duffy died from complications of COVID-19 at Greenwich Hospital on April 1, 2020, aged 87.

== See also ==
- List of United States federal judges by longevity of service

Legal offices
Preceded by Irving Ben Cooper	Judge of the United States District Court for the Southern District of New York; 1972–1998	Succeeded by Richard M. Berman
