= Irving Ben Cooper =

American judge

Senior Judge of the United States District Court for the Southern District of New York
- In office February 7, 1972 – September 17, 1996

Judge of the United States District Court for the Southern District of New York
- In office October 5, 1961 – February 7, 1972
- Appointed by: John F. Kennedy
- Preceded by: Seat established by 75 Stat. 80
- Succeeded by: Kevin Duffy

Personal details
- Born: Irving Ben Cooper; February 7, 1902 London, England
- Died: September 17, 1996 (aged 94) New York City, New York, U.S.
- Education: Washington University in St. Louis (LLB)

Irving Ben Cooper (February 7, 1902 – September 17, 1996) was an American attorney and jurist who served as a United States district judge of the United States District Court for the Southern District of New York.

== Early life and education ==
Born on February 7, 1902, in London, England, Cooper received a Bachelor of Laws in 1925 from the Washington University School of Law.

== Career ==
Cooper worked in private practice in New York City, New York, from 1927 to 1938. He served as special counsel for the New York City Department of Investigation from 1934 to 1937. He was a magistrate for New York City from 1938 to 1939. He was a justice of the New York Court of Special Sessions from 1939 to 1960, serving as chief justice from 1951 to 1960, when he resigned, citing the mental strain of the job. He was a lecturer at the Menninger Foundation from 1960 to 1961.

Cooper received a recess appointment from President John F. Kennedy on October 5, 1961, to the United States District Court for the Southern District of New York, to a new seat authorized by 75 Stat. 80. He was nominated to the same position by President Kennedy on January 15, 1962. His confirmation was opposed by both the American Bar Association and the New York County Lawyers Association. During the hearings, Cooper was described by witnesses, according to Time magazine, as "a temperamental tyrant who threw tantrums on the bench like a baby in a high chair." During his testimony at the hearing, Cooper refused to sit down, remaining standing for nearly three hours.

He was confirmed by the United States Senate on September 20, 1962, and received his commission on September 28, 1962. He assumed senior status on February 7, 1972. His service terminated on September 17, 1996, due to his death in New York City.

=== Notable cases and judicial philosophy ===
In 1970, Cooper presided over a claim that organized baseball exerted a monopolistic hold on all major and minor league teams, and in 1982, a complaint filed by Jacqueline Onassis that a photographer was harassing her and her daughter, Caroline Kennedy. During his service as chief justice of the New York Court of Special Sessions, Cooper wrote yearly reports on the problems regarding the treatment of young offenders in the criminal justice system, asserting "It is not impossible for a sentence to be a greater injustice than the criminal act: equivalent to putting a child with a common cold into a smallpox ward for treatment."

== See also ==
- List of Jewish American jurists

Legal offices
Preceded by Seat established by 75 Stat. 80	Judge of the United States District Court for the Southern District of New York; 1961–1972	Succeeded by Kevin Duffy
