= Nelson S. Román =

American judge (born 1960)

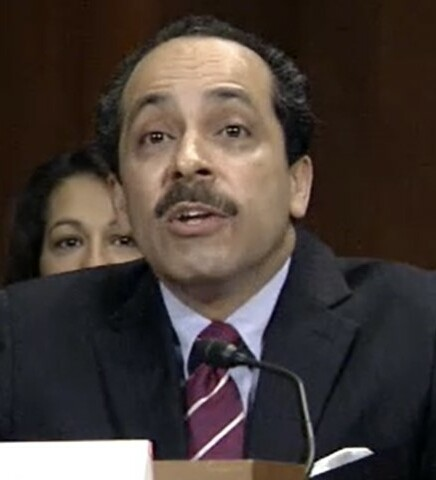
- Román in 2013

Judge of the United States District Court for the Southern District of New York
- Incumbent
- Assumed office May 13, 2013
- Appointed by: Barack Obama
- Preceded by: Richard M. Berman

Personal details
- Born: 1960 (age 65–66) New York City, New York, U.S.
- Education: Fordham University (BA); Brooklyn Law School (JD)

Nelson Stephen Román (born 1960) is a United States district judge of the United States District Court for the Southern District of New York.

== Biography ==
=== Early life and education ===
Román was born in 1960 in New York City of Puerto Rican ancestry. He was raised in the Bronx and educated in the New York City public schools system. He graduated from Cardinal Hayes High School in the Bronx. He received his Bachelor of Arts degree in 1984 from Fordham University. He received his Juris Doctor in 1989 from Brooklyn Law School. Prior to receiving his J.D., he worked as a police officer in New York City for seven years.

== Career ==
From 1989 to 1995, Román served as an assistant district attorney in Brooklyn, Manhattan and for the Special Narcotics Prosecutor. He served as a law clerk for Judge Jose A. Padilla, Jr. of the New York City Civil Court from 1995 to 1998. He served as a Judge of the New York City Civil Court from 1998 to 2002, handling housing cases during his first two years and civil matters during his final two years. He served as a justice of the New York Supreme Court in Bronx County from 2003 to 2009 where he handled civil matters. He served as an associate justice of the First Appellate Division of the New York State Supreme Court from 2009 to 2013, having been appointed to that post by Governor David Paterson. He served as president of the Puerto Rican Bar Association from 1997–1998.

=== Federal judicial service ===
On September 20, 2012, President Barack Obama nominated Román to serve as a United States District Judge for the United States District Court for the Southern District of New York, to the seat vacated by Judge Richard M. Berman who assumed senior status on September 11, 2011. On January 2, 2013, his nomination was returned to the President, due to the sine die adjournment of the Senate. On January 3, 2013, he was renominated to the same office. He received a hearing before the Senate Judiciary Committee on January 23, 2013, and his nomination was reported to the floor on February 28, 2013, by a voice vote. On May 9, 2013, his nomination was confirmed by a 97–0 vote. He received his commission on May 13, 2013.

== See also ==
- List of Hispanic and Latino American jurists

Legal offices
Preceded by Richard M. Berman	Judge of the United States District Court for the Southern District of New York; 2013–present	Incumbent
