= Chimène Keitner =

American-Canadian legal scholar

- Citizenship: American-Canadian
- Occupation: Legal Scholar
- Notable work: The Paradoxes of Nationalism

Chimène Keitner is an American-Canadian legal scholar and professor of law. She currently holds the Martin Luther King Jr. Professorship at the University of California, Davis School of Law, where she also serves as the Homer G. Angelo and Ann Berryhill Endowed Chair in International Law. She is known for her work in international law, foreign sovereign immunity, and civil litigation.

== Early life and career ==
Keitner completed her Bachelor of Arts in History and Literature from Harvard University in 1996. She was a Rhodes Scholar and completed a DPhil in International Relations at the University of Oxford in 2001. She received a Juris Doctor from Yale Law School in 2002.

After completing law school, Keitner served as a law clerk to Chief Justice Beverley McLachlin of the Supreme Court of Canada. She has held faculty positions at several law schools in the United States, including a regular appointment at University of California Hastings College of the Law, and visiting positions at the University of California, Berkeley, and the University of Southern California.

From 2016 to 2017, she was the 27th Counsellor on International Law at the United States Department of State, where she advised on matters of international and national security law. Her article "Prosecuting Foreign States" published in the Virginia Journal of International Law was cited by Justice Anthony Kennedy in his opinion for the Court in Turkiye Halk Bankasi A.S. v. United States.

== Awards and honors ==
Keitner received a Rhodes Scholarship in 1995. She received the Paul & Daisy Soros Fellowship for New Americans in 2001.

== Personal life ==
In 2003, she married Ram Fish.

== Selected publications ==
- Keitner, Chimene I. (2007-01-11). The Paradoxes of Nationalism. Albany: SUNY Press. ISBN 978-0-7914-6957-6.
- Keitner, Chimène (2008). "Conceptualizing complicity in alien tort cases". Hastings Law Journal. 60 (1): 61–104.
- Weiner, Allen S.; Hollis, Duncan B.; Keitner, Chimène (2023-06-10). International Law. Burlington, MA: Aspen Publishing. ISBN 978-1-5438-4032-2.
- Keitner, Chimène (2025-11-17). International Law Frameworks. Foundation Press. ISBN 979-8-89209-838-0.
