= Richard M. Berman =

American judge (born 1943)

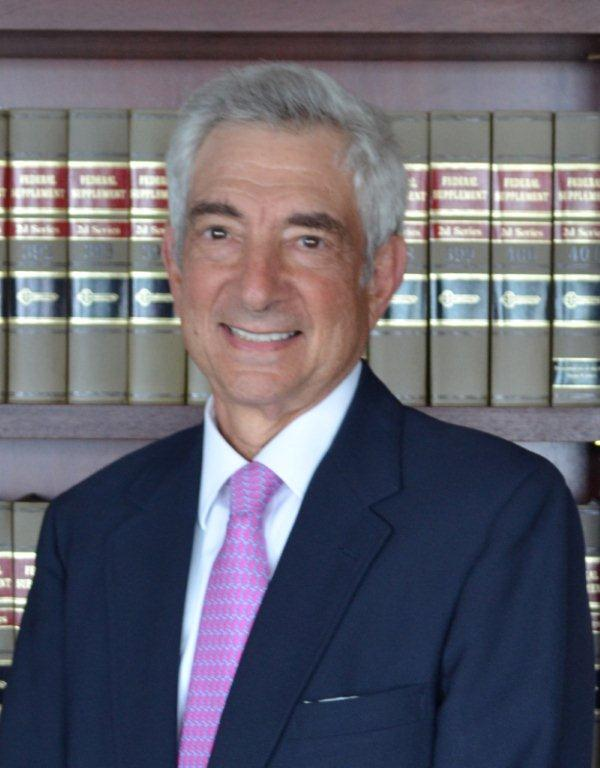

Senior Judge of the United States District Court for the Southern District of New York
- Incumbent
- Assumed office September 11, 2011

Judge of the United States District Court for the Southern District of New York
- In office October 22, 1998 – September 11, 2011
- Appointed by: Bill Clinton
- Preceded by: Kevin Thomas Duffy
- Succeeded by: Nelson S. Román

Personal details
- Born: Richard M Berman; 1943 (age 82–83) New York City, New York, U.S.
- Education: Cornell University (BS); New York University (JD); Fordham University (MSW)

Richard M. Berman (born 1943) is a senior United States district judge of the United States District Court for the Southern District of New York.

== Education and early career ==
Berman received his Bachelor of Science degree from Cornell University in 1964. He earned his Juris Doctor from New York University School of Law in 1967. He received a Diploma of Comparative Law in 1968 and a Diploma of International Law in 1970 from the University of Stockholm Faculty of Law, where he also served as Assistant to the Dean of Foreign Students. He received a Master of Social Work from Fordham Graduate School of Social Service in 1996. He went into private practice at Davis Polk & Wardwell in 1970. In 1974, he became Executive Assistant to United States Senator Jacob Javits. In 1977, he was named executive director of the New York State Alliance to Save Energy, co-chaired by Senators Javits and Daniel Patrick Moynihan. A year later, he was appointed General Counsel and Executive Vice President of the Warner Cable Corporation, a position he held until 1986, when he returned to private practice as a partner of LeBoeuf, Lamb, Greene & MacRae.

== Judicial career ==
Berman was appointed by Mayor Giuliani as judge of the New York State Family Court for Queens County (1995 to 1998). On May 21, 1998, he was named by President Bill Clinton to a seat on the District Court for the Southern District of New York. He was confirmed by the United States Senate on October 21, 1998. Berman assumed senior status on September 11, 2011.

He is a member of the New York State-Federal Judicial Council, which is concerned with issues of interest to the state and federal judiciary. Berman served as Chairman of the council from 2011 to 2012. Berman is currently the Chairman of the Southern District of New York Senior Judges Committee. Berman was previously a co-chair of the Second Circuit Judicial Conference in 2005 and 2022.

== Notable cases ==
=== U.S. District Court ===
==== United States v. Ferguson ====
In June 2024, Berman presided over the criminal jury trial of Ricardo Ferguson for conspiracy to distribute crack cocaine, attempted Hobbs Act robbery, murder through the use of a firearm, and using and carrying a firearm in furtherance of drug trafficking. Ferguson was found guilty on June 18, 2024.

==== United States v. Buyer ====
In March 2023, Berman presided over the criminal jury trial of former U.S. Congressman Stephen Buyer for “insider trading” for buying shares of Spring and Navigant Consulting before both were acquired by other companies, which he knew through his consulting work before the information was made public. He was found guilty on March 10, 2023. On September 19, 2023, Berman sentenced Buyer to a term of 22 months of incarceration and 3 years of supervised release. Buyer was also ordered to forfeit $354,027 in illegal gains and given a $10,000 fine.

==== United States v. Hadden ====
In January 2023, Berman presided over the criminal jury trial of gynecologist Robert Hadden for sexually assaulting his patients during examinations. Berman sentenced Haden in July 2023 to the maximum term of 20 years of incarceration and a lifetime of supervised release.

==== United States v. Halkbank ====
On October 15, 2019, Turkish bank Halkbank was indicted for allegedly conspiring to defraud the United States. In August 2020, Halkbank filed a motion to dismiss, alleging that the District Court lacked personal jurisdiction and that Halkbank is immune from liability under the Foreign Sovereign Immunities Act and “common law” principles. On October 1, 2020, Berman denied Halkbank's motion to dismiss, and on October 22, 2021, the U.S. Court of Appeals for the Second Circuit affirmed Berman's decision. The Supreme Court also rejected Halkbank's argument that it has immunity under the Foreign Sovereign Immunities Act, but remanded to the Second Circuit to consider whether the bank has immunity under “common law” principles. In dissent, Justice Neil Gorsuch wrote that the Supreme Court's decision “overcomplicates the law for no good reason.”

==== United States v. Atilla ====
In November and December 2017, Berman presided over the criminal jury trial of Turkish citizen Mehmet Hakan Atilla. Atilla was convicted of 5 out of 6 counts in the Indictment, including conspiracies to evade U.S. sanctions against Iran and to defraud the United States, and bank fraud. Atilla was sentenced on May 16, 2018, to 32 months in prison.

==== United States v. Owens et al ====
In September 2018, four individuals were charged in the “Panama Papers” conspiracy with unlawfully evading U.S. tax laws. Two of four defendants pleaded guilty to the charges. The remaining two defendants have not appeared in the S.D.N.Y. proceedings.

==== United States v. Epstein ====
In July 2019, Berman was assigned the case of financier Jeffrey Epstein who was charged with Sex Trafficking and Conspiracy to Commit Sex Trafficking. On July 18, 2019, Berman denied Epstein's bail application, finding that he posed a danger to the community and that he was also a flight risk. On July 23, 2019, Epstein attempted suicide at the Metropolitan Correctional Center (“MCC”) and on August 10, 2019, he committed suicide at the MCC. On August 27, 2019, Berman conducted a public hearing on the government's motion to dismiss the case. Twenty-seven alleged victims, along with the government and defense counsel, participated at the hearing. On August 29, 2019, Berman granted the motion to dismiss.

==== Ortiz v. United States ====
In March 2019, Berman denied an inmate's habeas corpus petition to vacate his six-year sentence. The Court held that the New York Penal Law § 120.05(7), or Second Degree Assault by a Convicted Prisoner, was a "crime of violence" under the United States Sentencing Guidelines and that Petitioner had waived his right to appeal.

==== Duka v. U.S. Securities & Exchange Commission ====
In August 2015, Berman enjoined the U.S. Securities and Exchange Commission from continuing its securities law administrative proceedings against Barbara Duka, finding that the SEC's administrative law judges had been appointed in violation of the Appointments Clause in the U.S. Constitution. Upon appeal, the injunction was dissolved based upon the Second Circuit's holding in SEC v. Tilton that parties "must await a final SEC order before raising their Appointments Clause claim in federal court." On June 21, 2018, the Supreme Court of the United States in Lucia v. SEC resolved a "circuit split" and ruled that the SEC's ALJs are officers of the United States and, as Berman had also concluded, subject to the Appointments Clause.

==== United States v. Rahimi ====
In October 2017, Berman presided over the criminal jury trial of Ahmad Khan Rahimi, also known as the "Chelsea bomber." Rahimi was convicted of all counts related to the September 2016 bombing in the Chelsea neighborhood of New York City, in which 31 people were injured. Rahimi was sentenced on February 13, 2018, to life in prison.

==== NFL Management Council v. NFL Players Association ("Deflategate") ====
Berman presided over New England Patriots quarterback Tom Brady's case involving a four-game suspension levied against him by the National Football League for Brady's alleged role in the 2015 "Deflategate" matter. After unsuccessful efforts to bring about a settlement, Berman overturned Brady's suspension in an opinion dated September 3, 2015, finding significant legal deficiencies attending Brady's suspension. These included the NFL's disregard of the rules and penalties regarding handling of footballs once they have left the locker room; denial of the opportunity for Brady to examine one of the two lead NFL investigators; and denial of access to investigative files. On April 25, 2016, a panel of the Court of Appeals for the Second Circuit reversed on the grounds that the Players Association had signed an arbitration agreement, and NFL Commissioner Roger Goodell's authority to implement the suspension. In dissent, Chief Judge Robert Katzmann determined that it was improper for the NFL Commissioner to review in arbitration his own decision to suspend Brady.

==== United States v. Kurniawan ====
Berman has presided over two landmark wine cases. One involved Rudy Kurniawan, who was convicted of counterfeiting fine wines in December 2013 following a jury trial, and sentenced to a term of incarceration.

==== Swedenburg v. Kelly ====
The second wine case involved a challenge to New York State liquor laws which prohibited out of state wineries from selling directly to consumers within New York. In November 2002, Berman held that New York's direct ban on such out of state wine sales was unconstitutional, as "[t]he New York regime constitutes a cut and dry example of direct discrimination against interstate commerce." The ruling was upheld by the Supreme Court of the United States in Granholm v. Heald.

==== United States v. Siddiqui ====
Berman presided over the case against Aafia Siddiqui, a Pakistani citizen and graduate of MIT and Brandeis University, who was convicted by a jury in 2010 of attempted murder of U.S. officials in Afghanistan, and sentenced to lengthy incarceration.

==== New York Taxi Workers Alliance v. New York City Taxi & Limousine Commission ====
In September 2007, Berman denied the NYC cab driver association's application to prevent the New York City Taxi and Limousine Commission from requiring that all taxicabs must be installed with credit- and debit-card readers.

==== MacWade v. Kelly ====
In December 2005, following a bench trial, Berman ruled that random police searches of riders' backpacks and bags on the New York City subway system do not violate the U.S. Constitution.

==== Gershkovich v. Iocco ====
Alex Gershkovich, a photographer involved in the Occupy Wall Street movement, sued two NYPD officers and the City of New York claiming that he was arrested without probable cause while photographing police activity in a public place. Berman, in a summary judgment decision dated July 17, 2017, determined that the right to record police activity in public areas was "clearly established" at the time of Gerskovich's arrest. The parties reached a settlement in November 2017.

==== Gordon v. Softech International, Inc. ====
After having determined that the Driver's Privacy Protection Act of 1994 ("DPPA") is not a "strict liability" statute, Berman presided over the civil jury trial against defendants Arcanum Investigations, Inc. and its executive director. On April 24, 2015, the jury found that defendants, who are resellers of DMV information were not liable. They had used reasonable care in providing plaintiff's information to a third party. By summary order, dated April 15, 2016, the Court of Appeals for the Second Circuit affirmed the judgment entered in connection with the jury's verdict.

==== United States v. D'Souza ====
Berman presided in the Dinesh D'Souza campaign finance case in May 2014. On the eve of trial, D'Souza pleaded guilty to campaign finance violations, (arranging straw donors), and was sentenced in September 2014 to five years of probation, $30,000 fine, and community service.

==== Ideal Steel Supply Corporation v. Anza ====
In June 2002, Berman dismissed a civil RICO suit against National Steel Supply, Inc., finding that plaintiff Ideal Steel failed to show that it had relied upon National Steel Supply's alleged misrepresentations to the New York State Department of Taxation and Finance. The decision was affirmed by the U.S. Supreme Court on June 5, 2006.

==== United States v. Leekin ====
In July 2008, Berman presided over the criminal case against Judith Leekin, who pleaded guilty to defrauding New York City and New York State adoption agencies out of $1.68 million in foster care funds. Leekin also had mistreated and willfully endangered her (11) adopted special needs children. Berman sentenced Leekin to 130 months in prison. She was also prosecuted for child abuse in Florida.

==== Dimmie v. Carey ====
In April 2000, Berman dismissed the infringement suit brought against pop singer Mariah Carey, finding that the plaintiff, Rhonda Dimmie, the holder of a copyright for the song Be Your Hero, had failed to show that Carey, the copyright-holder for the song Hero, had knowledge of or infringed upon plaintiff's recording.

==== Johnson v. Johnson ====
In January 2011, Berman presided over a trial in which a father sought the return of his child from New York to Vicenza, Italy pursuant to the Hague Convention of the Civil Aspects of International Child Abduction. Following a bench trial, Berman found that Italy was not the habitual residence of the child, who also strenuously objected to being returned to Italy.

=== Family Court Case ===
==== In the Matter of Shawna E. ====
In January 1998, as a New York State family court judge, Berman removed two children from the custody of then professional baseball player Carl Everett and his wife. The Everetts had consented to findings of child neglect following the discovery of bruises on their daughter at the Shea Stadium child care center.

=== U.S. District Court 3 Judge Panels ===
==== Rodriguez v. Pataki ====
Berman was part of a three-judge panel that heard challenges to the redistricting plan enacted by the New York State Legislature following the 2000 census. Following a bench trial in November 2003, the three-judge panel found that New York's redistricting plan did not violate the Voting Rights Act or the Equal Protection Clause of the Fourteenth Amendment. In November 2004, the U.S. Supreme Court affirmed by summary order.

==== Nitke v. Gonzales ====
Berman was part of a three-judge panel that heard challenges to obscenity provisions of the Communications Decency Act of 1996. In July 2005, the Court found that the Act was not overbroad and did not violate the First Amendment. In March 2006, the U.S. Supreme Court affirmed by summary order.

=== U.S. Circuit Court Opinions ===
==== Carpenters Pension Trust Fund of St. Louis v. Barclays PLC ====
In April 2014, Berman—sitting by designation on the U.S. Court of Appeals for the Second Circuit—authored the panel's opinion reinstating a securities fraud class action brought by pension funds against Barclays PLC and former Barclays' CEO Robert Diamond. Plaintiffs alleged that defendants had knowingly submitted false and inaccurate information to establish LIBOR rates during the class period of August 2007 through January 2009. The Court adopted the principle that "so long as the falsehood remains uncorrected, it will continue to taint the total mix of available public information, and the market will continue to attribute the artificial inflation to the stock, day after day."

==== Evans v. Books-A-Million ====
In August 2014, Berman—sitting by designation on a panel of the U.S. Court of Appeals for the Eleventh Circuit—heard the appeal of an employee who had been terminated from her job. The Court of Appeals held that the district court correctly awarded summary judgment to plaintiff on her COBRA claims and to Books-A-Million with respect to plaintiff's Title VII and Equal Pay Act claims, but erred in dismissing plaintiff's FMLA claims. The Court of Appeals found that "[i]if a trial court refuses to grant further legal or equitable relief to a plaintiff who insists that such relief is necessary to make the plaintiff whole, it must articulate its rationale."

==== New England Insurance Co. v. Healthcare Underwriters Mutual Insurance Co. ====
In July 2002, Berman—sitting by designation on a panel of the Second Circuit Court of Appeals—heard the appeal of New England Insurance Company, following the district court's reversal of a jury verdict in favor of New England Insurance. The Second Circuit reinstated the jury verdict. "We necessarily disagree with the 'clear liability' language []introduced by the district court in deciding Healthcare's post-trial application for judgment as a matter of law. As noted, 'clear liability' was specifically rejected and abandoned [and] there is no case since Pavia in which a court held that a finding of clear liability was given conclusive or totally dispositive weight."

== Publications and Teaching ==
Berman has authored a number of articles about children, including A Team Model To Identify Child Abuse, Seven Steps To Protect Children, Community Service for Juvenile Offenders, and Special Immigrant Juvenile Status. Published in the New York Law Journal, these articles offer guidance in developing improved models for identifying child abuse, bolstering the child welfare system, implementing community service-based sentencing options for juvenile offenders, and improving the process for obtaining special immigrant juvenile status.

Berman's efforts in improving media access to the Family Court system and promoting community service have been cited in the New York Daily News and Newsday. See, e.g., Sun Also Rises in Family Court, Helping Other Helps Teens, Embracing Community Service for Juveniles, and A New Way Out of Trouble.

Berman lectured about the "Rule of Law" before judges in Albania in 2013. He has also moderated a panel discussion of the "Rule of Law" at an international legal symposium in Istanbul, Turkey in 2014.

== Federal Court Involvement in Supervised Release ==
Berman has been actively involved in the supervised release of all defendants (201) whom he sentenced to incarceration. Between January 1, 2020, and June 18, 2024, Berman has conducted over 960 supervised release hearings.

Drawing upon his MSW studies and Family Court experience, this Court Involved Supervised Release project has produced positive supervised release outcomes (regarding recidivism/desistance and successful termination of supervision) which are detailed in five written reports, dated April 2021, September 2021, April 2022, October 2022, and June 2024.

On October 13, 2021, Berman participated on a panel with the Honorable L. Felipe Restrepo for the Penn Program on Regulation titled How Judges Can Make a Difference in the Success of Supervised Release.

== Awards ==
Berman received the National Association of Social Workers (NYC) Emerald award for 20 years of leadership as a licensed social worker and judge on March 28, 2019.

== See also ==
- List of Jewish American jurists

Legal offices
Preceded by Kevin Thomas Duffy	Judge of the United States District Court for the Southern District of New York; 1998–2011	Succeeded by Nelson S. Román
