= Muammer Akkaş =

Turkish prosecutor (born 1973)

- Citizenship: Turkish
- Occupation: Prosecutor
- Employer: Ministry of Justice of Turkey
- Known for: 25 December 2013 corruption investigation in Turkey; Ergenekon investigation; Hrant Dink murder investigation

Muammer Akkaş (born 1973 in Yalvaç, Isparta) is a former Turkish public prosecutor. During his time at the Istanbul Chief Public Prosecutor's Office, he worked on several high-profile cases, including Ergenekon, the murder of Hrant Dink, the Selam-Tevhid investigation, the Gezi Park protests, and the corruption and bribery investigation launched on 25 December 2013. In 2015, he was dismissed from the profession by a decision of the High Council of Judges and Prosecutors.

== Career ==
Muammer Akkaş worked as a specially authorized prosecutor at the Istanbul Chief Public Prosecutor's Office, where he was involved in several high-profile investigations.

Ergenekon investigation: Akkaş was involved in legal proceedings related to the Ergenekon investigation. In later years, allegations were raised about how some witness statements had been obtained during the investigation, and his name came up in connection with these claims.

External videos
- The first and only interview with prosecutor Muammer Akkaş about the 25 December investigation (YouTube)

25 December 2013 corruption and bribery investigation: Akkaş led the corruption and bribery investigation launched in Istanbul on 25 December 2013. The case focused on allegations involving businesspeople and public officials, and Bilal Erdoğan, the son of then-Prime Minister Recep Tayyip Erdoğan, was also mentioned in connection with the investigation.

Akkaş ordered the detention of several people as part of the investigation, but his instructions were not carried out as expected, leading to disagreements with the police. On 26 December 2013, the case file was taken away from him and transferred to other prosecutors. In a statement issued that day, Akkaş said that he had been prevented from carrying out the investigation and had come under pressure.

Hrant Dink murder investigation: In 2011, Akkaş took over the investigation into the possible involvement of public officials in the murder of journalist Hrant Dink. He worked on the case for about three years, looking into claims that some officials had failed to prevent the murder. Several people were questioned during the investigation.

In January 2014, Akkaş said that the case file had been taken away from him just as the investigation was about to move forward with planned operations.

Gezi Park protests and the Çarşı group: Akkaş was also involved in legal proceedings related to the Gezi Park protests in 2013. He took part in the questioning of members of Çarşı, a Beşiktaş football supporters' group.

Selam Tevhid investigation: Akkaş was also linked to the Selam Tevhid investigation, which focused on an alleged organization said to have ties to Iran. Investigators looked into the activities of several people and their connections.

The case became controversial after allegations emerged that politicians, journalists and public officials had been wiretapped as part of the investigation. In the years that followed, legal proceedings were launched to examine whether the methods used during the investigation had been lawful.
