= Hüseyin Korkmaz =

- Born: July 1, 1987
- Died: January 7, 2025 (aged 37); United States
- Citizenship: Turkish
- Occupation: Police officer
- Employer: Turkish National Police
- Organization: Istanbul Police Department
- Known for: 17 December corruption and bribery investigation in Turkey-17 December 2013 corruption investigation, witness in the Halkbank trial

Hüseyin Korkmaz (1 July 1987 – 7 January 2025) was a Turkish former police officer who held the rank of deputy commissioner. He served in the Financial Crimes Branch of the Istanbul Police Department. He was among the police officers involved in the 17 December 2013 corruption and bribery investigation. In 2014, he was arrested as part of legal proceedings against police officers involved in the investigation. He spent approximately 17 months in prison before being released in 2016.

== Career ==
Korkmaz served as a deputy commissioner in the Financial Crimes Branch of the Istanbul Police Department. He was part of a team working on financial crime and corruption investigations. He was among the police officers who took part in the corruption and bribery operation carried out on 17 December 2013.

External videos
- Documentary on the 2013 corruption and bribery investigations in Turkey
- Documentary on the 2013 corruption and bribery investigations in Turkey

External videos
- Turkey in 2013: documentary on the corruption and bribery investigations
- documentary on the corruption and bribery investigations

== The 17 and 25 December investigations ==
Following the 17 and 25 December2013 investigations, legal proceedings were initiated against the police officers involved. Korkmaz was investigated over allegations of misconduct and links to an organization. He was detained and arrested in September 2014. He spent approximately 17 months in Silivri Prison.

In his petition seeking release, Korkmaz stated that he had not been involved in the 25 December case and argued that his detention was unjustified. He was released pending trial in February 2016.

On the day of his arrest, Korkmaz shouted ''The king is naked!'' and "If we were afraid of thieves, we wouldn't be police officers!" as he was being taken into a police vehicle. The footage of the incident attracted considerable public attention.

== United States ==
Following his release, Korkmaz left Turkey and settled in the United States. In December 2017, he testified as a witness in the Halkbank trial in New York. He gave evidence about his role in the 17 December investigation, the investigation into Reza Zarrab, and evidence obtained during the operation.

== Death ==
Hüseyin Korkmaz died in the United States on 7 January 2025 after undergoing cancer treatment for an extended period.

External videos
- The interview journalist Adem Yavuz Arslan conducted with Korkmaz regarding the December 17 investigation. (YouTube)

Following his death, journalist Adem Yavuz Arslan published an interview he had conducted with Korkmaz about the 17 December investigation.
