= Yakub Saygılı =

- Citizenship: Turkey
- Education: Police College,Police Academy
- Occupation: Police chief
- Known for: 17 December corruption and bribery investigation
- Office: Head of the Istanbul Financial Crimes Branch
- Term: 2012–2013

Yakub Saygılı is a former Turkish police chief. He served as the head of the Financial Crimes Branch of the Istanbul Police Department between 2012 and 2013. During his tenure, he was involved in the investigation carried out on 17 December 2013, publicly known as the 17 December corruption and bribery operation. Following the investigation, he was removed from his position and later dismissed from the police force. In 2014, he was arrested as part of an investigation against him.

== Career ==
Saygılı entered the Police College in 1987. In 1991, he began studying at the Police Academy. In 1995, he began working at the Ankara Riot Police Branch. The following year, he was assigned to the Prime Ministry Protection Directorate. In subsequent years, he served in Counterterrorism, Anti-Smuggling and Organized Crime, and Financial Crimes units in Ankara and Diyarbakır. In 2005, he was appointed as an expert trainer within the Organization for Security and Co-operation in Europe (OSCE), where he served in this position for two years. During this period, he provided training to police forces in the fields of physical and electronic surveillance. In 2010, he was appointed deputy head of the Istanbul Financial Crimes Branch. In 2012, he became head of the same branch.

External videos
- Turkey in 2013: documentary on the corruption and bribery investigations
- documentary on the corruption and bribery investigations

External videos
- Documentary on the 2013 corruption and bribery investigations in Turkey
- Documentary on the 2013 corruption and bribery investigations in Turkey

== 17 December investigation ==
While serving as head of the Istanbul Financial Crimes Branch, Saygılı was involved in the investigation into corruption and bribery carried out in Istanbul on 17 December 2013. He was removed from his position the following day, on 18 December 2013. In interviews he gave later, Saygılı argued that the investigation had been carried out on the instructions of a public prosecutor. He stated that the failure to inform certain administrative authorities before the operation was due to the confidentiality of the investigation and that law enforcement officers had followed the judicial instructions given to them. In 2014, administrative and judicial proceedings were initiated against Saygılı in connection with the conduct of the 17 December investigation. He was dismissed from the police force the same year. Saygılı also filed criminal complaints regarding the actions taken against him.

== Trial and arrest ==
In 2014, Saygılı was also detained as part of investigations targeting police officers who had been involved in the 17 and 25 December investigations. Saygılı was arrested on 4 September on charges of an alleged coup attempt. In 2015, he was released in connection with the 17 December investigation after giving a statement; however, it was reported that his detention continued in relation with another case.

A case was brought against Saygılı and other former police officers over allegations of irregularities and a conspiracy concerning the conduct of the 17 December investigation. Sixty-seven defendants were tried before the Istanbul 14th High Criminal Court. The indictment included allegations against Saygılı of attempting to overthrow the Government of the Republic of Turkey or prevent it from carrying out its duties, as well as allegations concerning personal data.

On 18 March 2019, the Istanbul 14th High Criminal Court sentenced Saygılı and 14 other defendants to aggravated life imprisonment for attempting to overthrow the Government of the Republic of Turkey. Saygılı was also sentenced to a total of 41 years and 6 months in prison for violating the confidentiality of communications and privacy. In 2023, the Court of Cassation partially upheld and partially overturned some of the rulings in the 17 December conspiracy case.
