= Babak Zanjani =

Iranian businessman (born 1974)

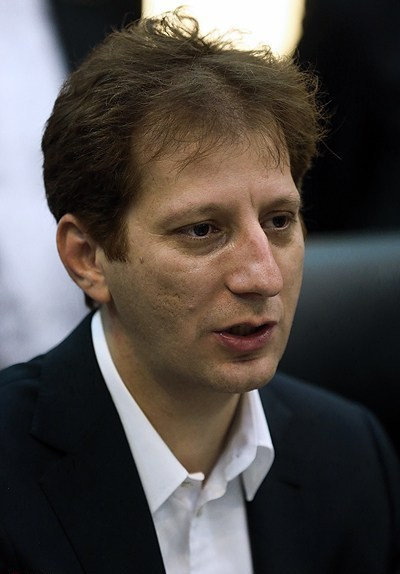
- Zanjani in 2013
- Born: 12 March 1974 (age 52); Tehran, Iran
- Occupation: Businessman
- Status: Stayed (2021)
- Criminal charge: Spreading corruption on earth
- Penalty: Execution

Details
- Date apprehended: 2013
- Website: www.babakzanjani.com

Babak Zanjani (Persian: بابک زنجانی, born 12 March 1974) is an Iranian billionaire and business magnate. He was the managing director of the UAE-based Sorinet Group, one of Iran's largest business conglomerates. In late 2013, he was arrested and accused of withholding $2.7 billion of government money owned by the Ministry of Petroleum, while facilitating Iran's oil revenue, which was hindered by the sanctions against Iran.

Zanjani was convicted of corruption and sentenced to death. In 2021, while awaiting execution, the Supreme Court of Iran indicated that the sentence would be commuted when his debts to the Iranian government were paid, and stayed his sentence, pending return of the embezzled funds. After the return of around $2.1 billion in assets, his sentence was commuted to 20 years of imprisonment on 30 April 2024. Several commentators have stated that Zanjani is perhaps a "fall guy" for corruption scandals in Iran.

== Sorinet Group ==
Sorinet Group (Persian: گروه شرکت‌های سورینت) is an Iranian business conglomerate. The company is one of Iran's largest business conglomerates. Sorinet businesses include cosmetics, finance and banking, hospitality, commercial aviation, infrastructure, building material, information technology and international real estate development. It operated in Iran, the United Arab Emirates, Turkey, Tajikistan, Malaysia, and China. He also owned Qeshm Air and Rah Ahan Sorinet F.C. in Iran.

In 2013, Zanjani stated that his net worth was $13.5 billion.

== EU sanctions against Iran ==
Zanjani was named in the restrictive measures against Iran in December 2012 by the Council of the European Union on the grounds that he "is assisting designated entities to violate the provisions of the EU regulation on Iran and is providing financial support to the government of Iran". Zanjani was claimed to be "a key facilitator for Iranian oil deals and transferring oil-related money". He denied the accusation, declining any ties with the Iranian government and calling the Europeans' decision "a mistake".

The EU sanctions against Iran describe Zanjani as "a key facilitator for Iranian oil deals" and transferring oil-related money and accused the Malaysia-based First Islamic Bank of being used to channel Iranian oil-related payments. Zanjani said the complex nature of his companies' large sums of transactions might have misled EU authorities. Zanjani's companies were involved in the Labuan—Iran oil smuggling route on the eastern coast of Malaysia. Labuan had been serving as a drop-off spot for Iranian crude.

== US sanctions ==
On April 11, 2013, the U.S. Department of the Treasury’s Office of Foreign Assets Control (OFAC) designated Babak Morteza Zanjani as a Specially Designated National under Executive Order 13382, accusing him of helping Iran evade sanctions by moving billions of dollars and channeling funds to IRGC-linked entities. The designation froze any U.S. assets he held, cut off his access to the American financial system, and prohibited U.S. persons from doing business with him.

On July 24, 2026, the Treasury announced sanctions against four individuals and nine Iranian-linked organizations connected to him for enabling the Iranian regime to evade sanctions.

== Alleged dual nationality ==
In January 2013, an Iranian news website, Baztab, reported that Zanjani holds a Danish passport in addition to his Iranian one, a claim which Zanjani later denied. He called the passport's copy "fake", saying in an interview with the news website of Rahahan F.C., his football team: "This story [the copy of my passport] is too badly fabricated that they even put my picture on the passport without a tie. However, it is obligatory to tie a necktie to take pictures for European passports," which is untrue.

== Arrest, initial conviction, and release ==
On 30 December 2013, Zanjani was arrested by Iranian police for his alleged role in the "gold for gas" sale of Iranian oil that avoided international sanctions in schemes Turkey and Malaysia. He was accused of embezzling more than €2.7 billion, involving, among others, the National Bank of Tajikistan. Some days later, a spokesman from the National Bank of Tajikistan denied any cooperation between Zanjani and the bank and claimed all documents presented by Zanjani about their two-way communications were fake. He was tried in an Islamic Revolutionary Court. On 6 March 2016, he was convicted and sentenced to death for embezzlement and "spreading corruption on earth". In December 2016, the Supreme Court of Iran confirmed the sentence.

However, his sentence has been stayed pending his return of the embezzled money, after which he may receive a pardon. Iran's Supreme Court indicated that his sentence would be commuted when his debts to the Iranian government were paid. On 30 April 2024, Zanjani's sentence was commuted to 20 years' imprisonment after returning around $2.1 billion in assets from illegally selling oil. Shortly after, reports emerged of his conditional release.

As of January 2025, photos of the newly-freed Zanjani were seen circulating in Iranian media.

== Return to business activities ==
Following his early release from prison, Zanjani reemerged in the corporate sector through a newly established holding company named Avan, registered on November 17, 2024, with a declared capital of 30 billion tomans (£375,000). Within five months, Avan expanded into ten subsidiaries across transportation, trade, and technology sectors, most notably Avan Rail. In April 2025, Avan Rail signed what was described as the largest private sector investment in the history of Iranian railways—a 61 trillion toman ($800 million) contract with Islamic Republic of Iran Railways to procure 300 diesel self-propelled passenger locomotives, 50 freight locomotives, and 600 tank freight wagons.

The deal quickly drew scrutiny due to the company’s limited capital and the opaque nature of its financing, which representatives attributed to an unnamed foreign investor. Despite official denials of Zanjani’s involvement, contradictory statements and corporate registration records indicated he held executive roles within the group. Reports from IranWire revealed that Zanjani retained stakes in at least 11 companies in Iran, suggesting a broad and active business portfolio. His resurgence sparked criticism across the political spectrum, including from conservative figures, who viewed the railway deal as a potential liability for President Masoud Pezeshkian’s administration. In May 2026, The Wall Street Journal reported that Zanjani was involved in financing the Islamic Revolutionary Guard Corps (IRGC) using accounts at Binance.

== See also ==
- Reza Zarrab
