= Nihat Zeybekci =

Turkish politician (born 1961)

Nihat Zeybekci MP
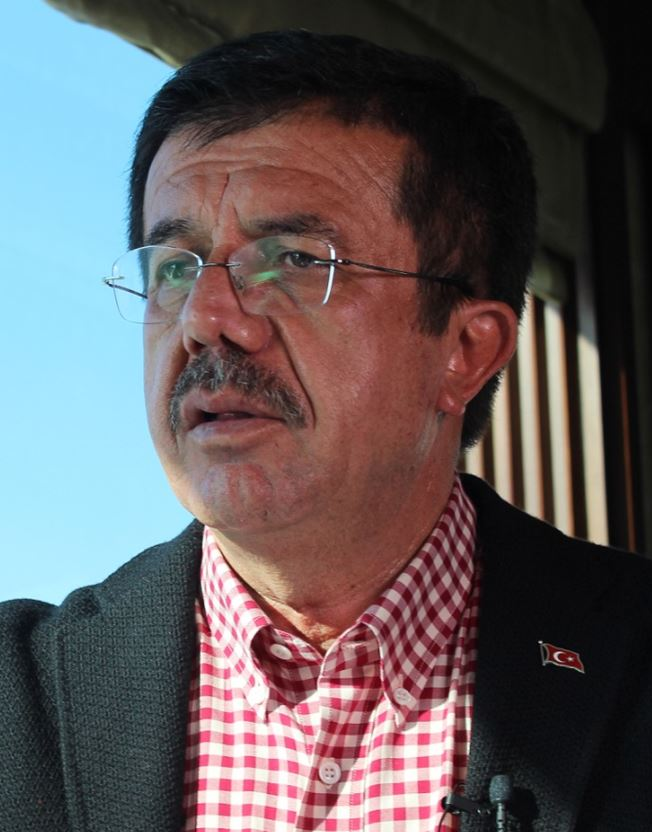

Minister of the Economy
- In office 24 May 2016 – 10 July 2018
- Prime Minister: Binali Yıldırım
- Preceded by: Mustafa Elitaş
- In office 25 December 2013 – 17 November 2015
- Prime Minister: Recep Tayyip Erdoğan; Ahmet Davutoğlu
- Preceded by: Zafer Çağlayan
- Succeeded by: Mustafa Elitaş

Member of the Grand National Assembly
- Incumbent
- Assumed office 12 June 2011
- Constituency: Denizli (2011, June 2015, Nov 2015)

Mayor of Denizli
- In office 28 March 2004 – 16 March 2011
- Preceded by: Ali Aygören
- Succeeded by: Osman Zolan

Personal details
- Born: 1 January 1961 (age 65) Pınarlar, Tavas, Denizli, Turkey
- Party: Justice and Development Party (AKP)
- Children: 4
- Education: Marmara University; Istanbul University
- Profession: Politician, economist
- Cabinet: 61st, 62nd, 63rd, 65th

Nihat Zeybekci (born 1 January 1961) is a Turkish economist, politician, a member of parliament for Denizli Province of the ruling Justice and Development Party (AKP) and former Minister of the Economy.

== Early life ==
Nihat Zeybekci was born to Şükrü and Fatma Zeybekci as the youngest of five children in the village of Pınarlar in Tavas district of Denizli Province on 1 January 1961. The family earned their living from tobacco farming, and Nihat helped his parents in his youth.

After studying Business Administration at Marmara University, he received his master's degree in International Relations from Istanbul University. He also claimed to have conducted further studies in economics at South London College in the United Kingdom, but he removed this information from his official resume after it turned out to be false.

He is married and has four children.

== Career ==
=== Profession ===
Zeybekci served as executive for companies in Istanbul and Denizli. In 1994, he founded a textile company. He was elected into the Denizli Chamber of Industry and chaired two terms Denizli Textile and Apparel Exporters' Association.

=== Politics ===
Zeybekci entered politics at regional level. In the 2004 local elections, he was elected Mayor of Denizli from the Justice and Development Party. He was re-elected to the post in the 2009 local elections. In 2011, he resigned to run for a seat in the parliament. During this time, he represented his city and country in some organizations for regional administrations at national and international level.

He was elected into the Grand National Assembly of Turkey in the 2011 general election as an MP from Denizli Province. On 26 December 2013, Nihat Zeybekci assumed office as the Minister of Economic Affairs, succeeding Zafer Çağlayan during Prime Minister Erdoğan's cabinet reshuffle with ten new names that was announced the day before, on 25 December, following the 2013 corruption scandal in Turkey.

He is considered as a close friend of Erdoğan, who spends his summer holidays together with Zeybekci.

Political offices
Preceded by Ali Aygören	Mayor of Denizli; 28 March 2004 – 16 March 2011	Succeeded by Osman Zolan
Preceded by Zafer Çağlayan	Minister of Economic Affairs; 26 December 2013 – 24 November 2015	Succeeded by Mustafa Elitaş
Preceded by Mustafa Elitaş	Minister of Economic Affairs; 24 May 2016 – 10 July 2018	Succeeded by Position abolished
