= Mehmet Hakan Atilla =

Turkish banker (born 1970)

- Born: 1970 (age 55–56); Ankara, Turkey
- Education: Gazi University
- Occupations: Banker, business executive
- Known for: General manager and a board member of Borsa Istanbul and prosecution in the U.S
- Spouse: Burçin Atilla
- Children: 1

Mehmet Hakan Atilla (born 1970) is a Turkish banker who served as deputy general manager of Halkbank and later as general manager and board member of Borsa Istanbul. In 2018 he was convicted in the United States of charges related to a scheme to evade United States sanctions against Iran and was sentenced to 32 months in prison. He was released in 2019 and later appointed general manager of Borsa Istanbul (the Turkish Stock Exchange).

== Early life and education ==
Mehmet Hakan Ati̇lla was born in Ankara in 1970. He graduated from the Department of Economics at Gazi University.

== Career ==
Atilla began his professional career at the Turkish state-owned Halkbank in 1995 as an assistant specialist in its research, development, and planning department. He then held two positions at Halkbank's Banking Cards and Cash Management departments and in strategic planning. From 22 June 2007 to 11 November 2011, he served as head of the financial institutions and Investor Relations Department.

In November 2011, Atilla became Halkbank's deputy general manager responsible for international banking, a position he held until 2018. He also served on the board of several Halkbank subsidiaries and as chairman of Halkbank Macedonia.

=== United States prosecution ===
In March 2017, Atilla was arrested in the United States in connection with an investigation into transactions involving Iran and the Turkish state owned Halkbank. U.S. prosecutor accused him of participation in a scheme to evade the U.S. sanctions on Iran and to conceal the nature of transactions from American financial institutions.

Atilla's trial took place in the United States District Court for the Southern District of New York in late 2017. Reza Zarrab, a Turkish Iranian gold trader who had pleaded guilty and cooperated with the U.S. prosecutors, was a principal witness for the prosecution. In January 2018, a federal jury found Atilla guilty on five of six accounts, including bank fraud and conspiracy charges. He was acquitted for money laundering charges. The case drew international attention and contributed to tensions between both governments.

In May 2018, U.S. District Judge Richard Berman sentenced Atilla to 32 months in prison. The Turkish Government criticized the conviction and sentencing, disputing the proceedings and describing the case as politically motivated. Atilla appealed his conviction, but the United States Court of Appeals for the Second Circuit upheld the judgement.

=== Return to Turkey ===
Atilla was released form the U.S. custody in July 2019 and returned to Turkey. In October 2019, he was appointed general manager and a board member of Borsa Istanbul, Turkey's stock exchange. His appointment was reported by Turkish and international media.

Atilla resigned from the position in March 2021. Borsa Istanbul's board accepted his resignation.

== Personal life ==
Atilla is married to Burçin Atilla, they have a son.

== See also ==
- Halkbank
- United States sanctions against Iran
- Reza Zarrab
- United States v. Atilla
