= Ministry of Economy (Turkey) =

Former government ministry of Turkey

- Ekonomi Bakanlığı

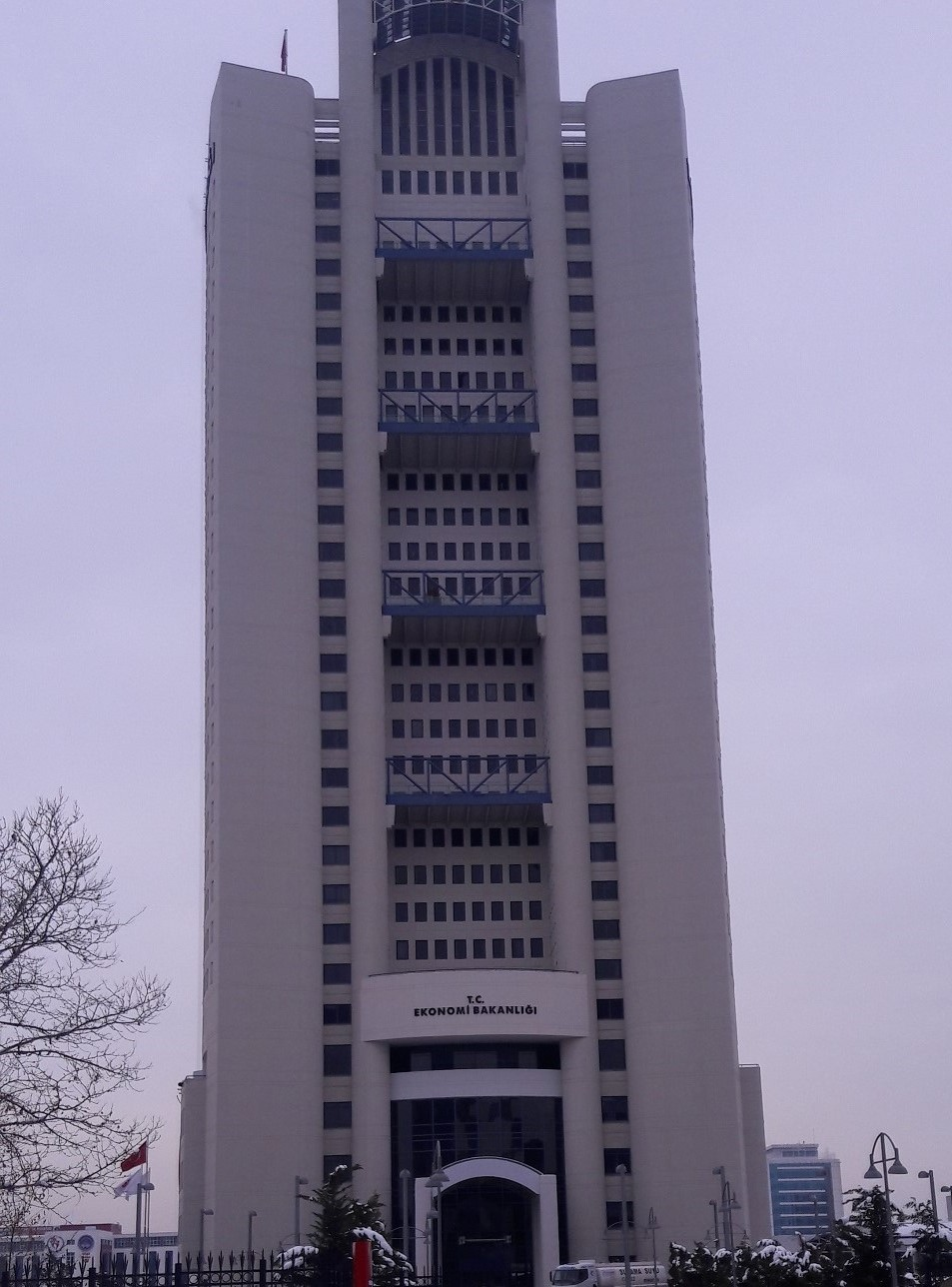
- Headquarters of Ministry of Economy in Ankara, Turkey.

Agency overview
- Formed: 29 June 2011
- Superseding agency: Ministry of Trade
- Jurisdiction: Government of Turkey
- Headquarters: Ankara
- Annual budget: 1.454.494.000 TL (2014)
- Minister responsible: Nihat Zeybekçi, Minister of the Economy
- Agency executives: Fatih Metin, Deputy Minister; İbrahim Şenel, Undersecretary; Kadir Bal, Deputy Undersecretary
- Website: www.ekonomi.gov.tr

The Ministry of Economy (Turkish: Ekonomi Bakanlığı) was a government department responsible for the economic affairs of the Republic of Turkey. It was established following the 2011 general election with Justice and Development Party (AKP) Member of Parliament Zafer Çağlayan being appointed as the first Minister of the Economy.

In 2018, this ministry was merged with the Ministry of Customs and Trade forming the new Ministry of Trade.
