= Halkbank =

Turkish bank

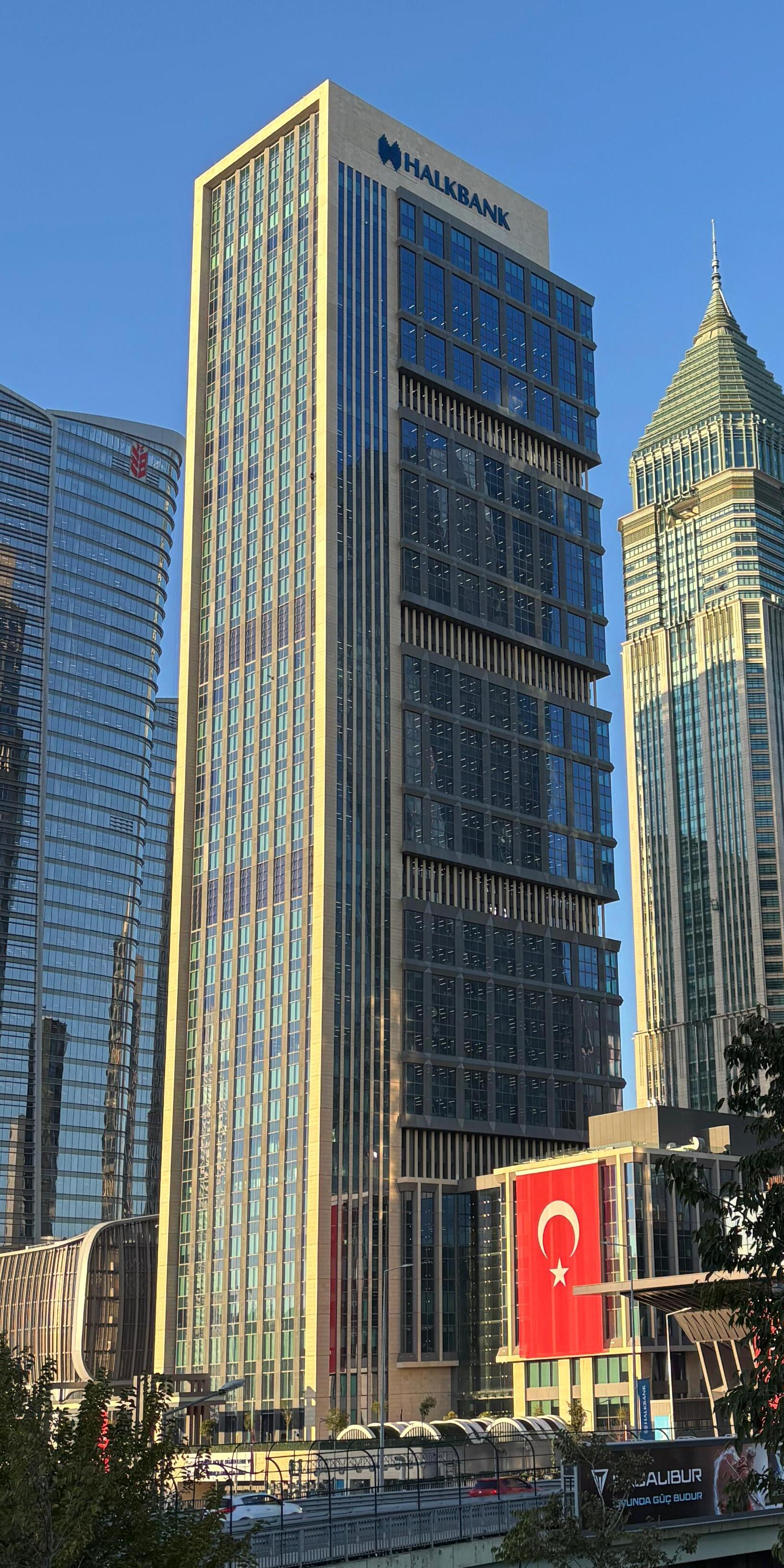
- Halkbank Headquarters, Ümraniye, Istanbul, Turkey
- Type: Anonim Şirket
- Traded as: BİST: HALKB
- Industry: Banking
- Founded: 8 June 1933; 93 years ago
- Headquarters: Finanskent Mah, Finans Cd No: 42/1, 34760, Ataşehir, Istanbul, Turkey
- Number of locations: 1,006 (2019)
- Key people: Süleyman Recep Özdil (Chairman); Osman Arslan (CEO)
- Products: Financial services, credit cards, consumer banking, corporate banking, investment banking, mortgage loans, private banking
- Revenue: ▲US$20.68 billion (2024)
- Operating income: ▼US$2.84 billion (2024)
- Net income: ▼US$708 million (2023)
- Total assets: ▲US$89.25 billion (2024)
- Total equity: ▲US$4.82 billion (2024)
- Owner: Turkey Wealth Fund
- Number of employees: 18,967 (2019)
- Website: halkbank.com.tr

Halkbank (lit. 'People's Bank') or officially Türkiye Halk Bankası is a Turkish bank, first incorporated on 8 June 1933 as a public bank. After growing throughout much of the twentieth century, it began absorbing smaller-sized public banks around the turn of the millennium. Halkbank is now a publicly traded company, although the majority stakeholder remains the Turkish government. Halkbank is a bank that offers vehicle loans, housing loans, consumer loans and commercial loans. A number of scandals and controversies involving the bank emerged in the 2010s, some of which culminated in arrests of its executives.

== History ==
Halkbank was incorporated in 1933 and began offering services in 1938. Between 1938 and 1950, it operated as a credit union whose purpose was to provide tradesmen and artisans with loans on favorable terms to promote economic growth in Turkey. In 1950, it began opening branches and granting loans to customers. By 1964, Halkbank embarked on an ambitious program that increased its capital and established a nationwide network of branches. In the 1990s and early 2000s, Halkbank absorbed several smaller failed public banks, including Töbank in 1992, Sümerbank in 1993, Etibank in 1998, and Emlakbank in 2001. A significant turning point for Halkbank occurred with the acquisition of Pamukbank in 2004. Following this, the bank underwent a substantial restructuring process in preparation for privatization. On 10 May 2007, 24.98% of Halkbank's shares were sold in a public offering and listed on the Istanbul Stock Exchange. By 16 November 2012, the percentage of listed shares increased to 48.9%. Halkbank's head office was moved from Ankara to Istanbul in June 2015. On 24 February 2017, publicly owned shares of Halkbank were transferred to the Turkey Wealth Fund.

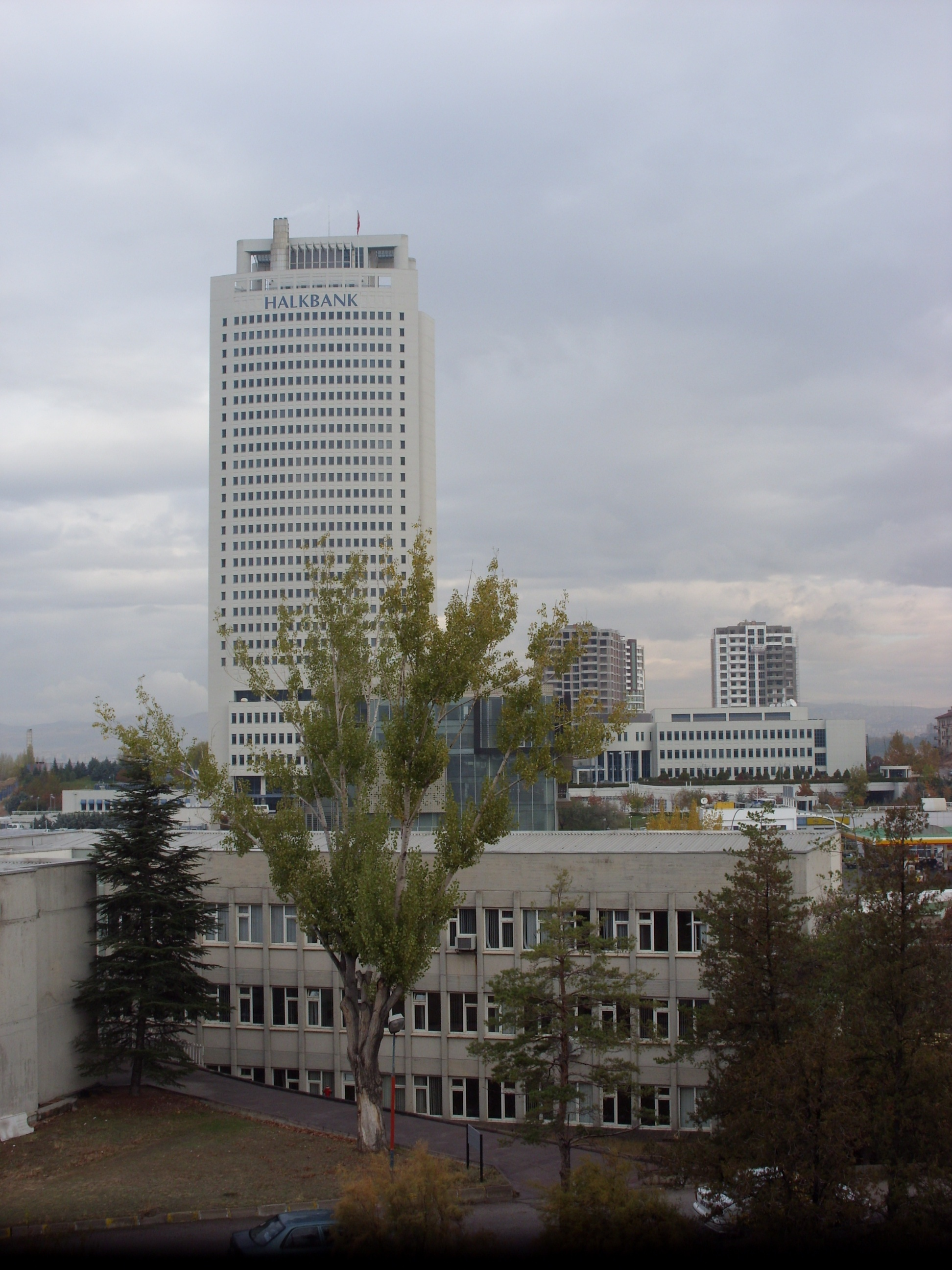
Halkbank's former headquarters in Ankara

== Iranian oil trading controversy ==
Halkbank was a link in the chain to finance Iranian petroleum interests following U.S.-led nuclear sanctions. In March 2012, Iran was stopped from using the international money transfer system SWIFT. Halkbank seems, between March 2012 and July 2013 while the UN sanctions regime was in place prior to the November 2013 P5+1 agreement, to have purchased some $13bn worth of gold on the open market. The sanctions prevented Iran from being paid in dollars or euros, but gold was never mentioned in the sanctions regime, and therefore this loophole allowed gold to be used to fund the purchase of Iranian petroleum products. Halkbank allowed the middlemen of Iran to buy gold with their Turkish lira, and that gold found its way back to Iranian coffers. One investigation found that US$2bn in gold bullion (about 36 tonnes) was flown from Turkey to Dubai in August 2012 alone. In defending its decision not to enforce its own sanctions, the Obama administration insisted that Turkey only transferred gold to private Iranian citizens. The administration argued that, as a result, this wasn't an explicit violation of its executive order. Iranian Ambassador to Turkey Ali Reza Bikdeli recently praised Halkbank for its "smart management decisions in recent years [that] have played an important role in Iranian-Turkish relations." Halkbank stated that there were no sanctions against trading precious metals with Iran until 1 July 2013.

Halkbank also had Indian accounts that in 2013 traded with Iran: "India now owes Iran $5.3 billion in oil debt. India is planning to pay Iran $1 billion per month – that is $12 billion annually – also through Halkbank."

=== 2013 corruption investigation ===
In December 2013, Halkbank's CEO Süleyman Aslan was arrested and charged with taking bribes from, among others, Reza Zarrab, an Iranian-Azeri businessman who had taken Turkish citizenship under the name Sarraf. Police reportedly discovered shoeboxes containing US$4.5 million in the home of Aslan. Scores of police officials have reportedly been dismissed because their investigations made politicians uncomfortable. The chain of police command was changed so that politicians would be informed of, and could frustrate, police activities. This caused an injunction to be heard in the court system, who blocked the change. A prosecutor was dismissed.

The arrest, which came along with many other arrests of officials allied with then-Prime Minister Recep Tayyip Erdoğan (now President of Turkey), is seen as part of a power struggle between the prime minister and exiled Turkish opposition leader Fethullah Gülen.

Oya Özarslan, of the corruption watchdog Transparency International, is worried: "[R]ecent changes in the police forces and public prosecutors breaking out this scandal as well as the changes in the regulation of the police forces leave a number of question marks."

=== U.S. conviction of executive ===
In March 2017, deputy head of the bank Mehmet Hakan Atilla was arrested by the U.S. government for conspiring to evade sanctions against Iran by helping Zarrab "use U.S. financial institutions to engage in prohibited financial transactions that illegally funneled millions of dollars to Iran". Zarrab was arrested in Miami, Florida, in March 2016. In Ankara in March 2017, U.S. Secretary of State Rex Tillerson said there was no link between the Turkish request for extradition of Gülen and the arrest of Atilla and that both cases would proceed in conformity with the law. Atilla's trial commenced in New York City federal court in November 2017, with Zarrab agreeing to testify after reaching a plea deal with prosecutors. According to The New York Times, the prosecution of Atilla and others has "sent tremors" through Turkish political circles. Erdoğan has sought, unsuccessfully, to persuade American officials to drop the case, and the public media has been downplaying coverage of the trial. Zarrab testified that the sanctions-evasion operation had Erdoğan's knowledge and approval, as well as that of Erdoğan's son-in-law, Selçuk Erdoğan.

In early 2018, Atilla was convicted on five of six counts against him, including bank fraud and conspiracies, and acquitted on one count after four days of jury deliberation. Zarrab was the prime prosecution witness in the seven days of trial testimony. Atilla's sentencing is scheduled for April 2018 and the bank fraud count alone carries a maximum sentence of 30 years in prison. Seven other co-defendants are still at large. In August 2018, Turkey and the United States were negotiating over the imprisonment by Turkey of pastor Andrew Brunson and neared an exchange which would have allowed Atilla to serve out his term "at home". But the Turkish foreign minister, per one report citing other reports, asked American officials "to kill any investigation into Halkbank". After that, for the time, "the deal collapsed".

In 2019, U.S. senator Ron Wyden launched an investigation.

=== Connection to the Geoffrey Berman-William Barr scandal ===
In 2016, President Erdoğan asked then-Vice-president Joe Biden to remove Preet Bharara, the U.S. attorney for the Southern District of New York who would go on to indict Zarrab. Following continued lobbying by President Erdoğan, Donald Trump did fire Bharara in 2017, and eventually replaced him with Geoffrey Berman. In late 2018, President Erdoğan personally lobbied President Trump to drop further investigations into Halkbank, once in person during the G20 meeting in Buenos Aires (1 November 2018), and once on a phone call (14 December 2018); according to John Bolton, a first-hand witness of both events, Trump then agreed to have the investigations dropped. On 14 December 2018, the Department of Justice, then headed by Matthew Whitaker, notified Berman's office, that it would become more involved in the Halkbank investigation. Despite pressure from acting-Attorney General Whitaker and his successor, William Barr, to shut down the investigation, Berman and the SDNY office continued their investigation, believing that their case was strong. In June 2019, Barr summoned Berman to his office in Washington to push Berman to drop charges against the defendants, including Turkey's former economy minister, Mehmet Zafer Caglayan, and terminate investigations of other suspected conspirators. Berman replied that this was unethical. After struggling with the legal technicalities of firing Berman, Barr announced on 19 June 2020, that Berman was "stepping down from his position" but also struggled to find a replacement on such short notice; for his part, Berman insisted that he had not resigned, and declined to leave office until his deputy Audrey Strauss, who planned to continue the investigation into Halkbank, had been installed.

In 2023, the Supreme Court of the United States ruled that the Turkish bank can be prosecuted in U.S. court for its role in a conspiracy to evade Iran sanctions and the Foreign Sovereign Immunities Act does not give immunity from criminal prosecution.

==== Federal indictment ====
The office of the United States Attorney for the Southern District of New York charged Halkbank for taking part in a scheme to evade US sanctions against Iran at the United States District Court for the Southern District of New York on 15 October 2019, with the case being assigned to judge Richard M. Berman. The indictment triggered a dispute between Turkey and the US.

The US Supreme Court in 2023 put back to the Second Circuit appeals court the question of common law immunity. In its appeal, Halk "argued that it should get the immunity foreign governments normally receive in U.S. courts because Turkey officially designated it as a repository for Iranian oil-sale proceeds and Turkish officials participated in the alleged scheme. Turkey in its legal filing said the bank was indistinguishable from its government." In October 2024, the appeals court turned down the appeal on the common law argument, saying "the bank’s activities were essentially commercial" and allowing the U.S. government's case to proceed. The Supreme Court denied Halkbank's appeal as well in October 2025.

Halkbank and the US Department of Justice reached an agreement to drop the case in March 2026, with prosecutors citing Turkey's assistance in negotiating the release of Israeli hostages during the Gaza war and the subsequent peace agreement. Halkbank also agreed to work with a third party for reviewing its compliance with US sanctions and rules against money laundering. Berman granted the request for a 90-day pause for the review on 11 March. The case was dismissed on 17 June, with Berman ruling had met the conditions for compliance.

== See also ==
- List of banks in Turkey
- 2013 corruption scandal in Turkey

== Sources ==
- Annual Report 2019 (PDF), Halkbank, 2019.
- "Halkbank Annual Report" (PDF). Halkbank. 2024.
