= Reza Zarrab =

Iranian-Turkish businessman (born 1983)

- Born: 12 September 1983 (age 42); Tabriz, Iran
- Citizenship: Iran; Azerbaijan; Turkey; North Macedonia
- Years active: 2004–present
- Spouses: Ebru Gündeş (m. 2010; div. 2021) Dilara Altıntop (m. 2025)
- Children: 1

Reza Zarrab (Persian: رضا ضراب, Turkish: Rıza Sarraf; born 12 September 1983) is an Iranian-born businessman based in Turkey. He has Iranian, Azerbaijani, Turkish and Macedonian citizenship.

In March 2016, he was arrested in the United States, accused of being a member of an international criminal organization. He was charged with evading US economic sanctions on Iran and money laundering in an alleged racket scheme to help Iran bypass the sanctions, involving ministers of the Turkish government of then prime minister and now president of Turkey, Recep Tayyip Erdoğan.

His father, Hossein Zarrab, had a close relationship with Mahmoud Ahmadinejad, who was the President of Iran from 2005 to 2013. The US Department of Treasury accused Hossein Zarrab of violating US sanctions on Iran, and fined him $9.1 million, reduced to $2.3 million following his cooperation with US officials. His charges; conspiracy to defraud, violating the International Emergency Economic Powers Act, money laundering, and bank fraud; could bring up to 70 years in prison if found guilty in the US Federal Court.

== Early life and education ==
Reza Zarrab was born in Tabriz, Iran, to Iranian Azerbaijani parents, and grew up in Azerbaijan and Turkey. Reza Zarrab became a dual citizen of Turkey and Azerbaijan after settling in Istanbul. Zarrab's parents remained in Baku through 2010–11; in 2013 they were granted Turkish citizenship reportedly through facilitation of then Interior Minister Muammer Güler.

On 1 June 2007 Zarrab received an "exceptional citizenship" and became a Turkish citizen with the decision given by the Turkish Council of Ministers. He was accused of bribing $1.5 million to receive Turkish Citizenship in the indictment. In 2008, Zarrab married Turkish pop star, Ebru Gündeş and they had a child in 2011. He started his business life in Turkey in 2008 with the company named Royal Maritime A.S. He founded Royal Holding with his brother Mohammed Zarrab (Can Sarraf) in 2010.

== Career ==
Before the 2013 corruption scandal in Turkey, there were already signs of Zarrab engaging in bribing Turkish officials. For instance, Zarrab's chauffeur, Turgut Happani, was arrested by the Turkish Customs Protection agency during his trip to Russia from Turkey in 2011 for carrying $150 million in cash and was accused of conducting illegal money couriering, but he was then released by Turkish authorities. Happani sped his own pictures on Facebook with suitcases full of money. Moreover, in 2007, he was given Turkish citizenship for a sum of $1.5 million.

In April 2013, the Turkish National Intelligence Agency (MIT) urged then Prime Minister Recep Tayyip Erdoğan about Zarrab's corrupted relations with the Turkish cabinet members. on 17 December 2013. Zarrab, who has a business affiliation with the Iranian billionaire and business magnate Babak Zanjani, was detained in Istanbul due to his involvement with the sons of three ministers (Erdoğan Bayraktar, Muammer Güler and Zafer Çağlayan) in the Turkish government and Egemen Bağış, the former minister for EU Affairs and Turkey's chief negotiator in accession talks with the European Union, in an alleged bribery, corruption and smuggling racket. The court ordered his arrest on 21 December along with Barış Güler, son of Muammer Güler, and Kaan Çağlayan, son of Zafer Çağlayan. He was released on 28 February 2014.

The investigation in Turkey revealed a system to help Iran bypass US sanctions against the country concerning the SWIFT payment system, in a scheme based on Turkish public bank Halkbank, whereby money was transferred to front companies in China and Turkey, and gold bought with that money transferred to Iran via Dubai.

Then Interior Minister Muammer Güler's son, Barış Güler, then Economy Minister Zafer Çaglayan's son, Kaan Çaglayan, and General Director of Halk Bank, Suleyman Arslan, were among the suspects including Reza Zarrab. They were arrested due to accusations of "bribery, professional misconduct, bid rigging, and smuggling".

Erdogan backlashed and announced the investigation as a "judicial coup" against his government, and dismissed the prosecutors and police officials investigating the corruption scheme. After a 70-day detainment, Zarrab and the sons of cabinet members were released from jail. Erdogan received harsh criticism for obstructing and undermining justice and putting the judiciary under his executive authority. However, Erdogan announced that "justice has been served".

Egemen Bağış, then Minister of European Union Affairs, was dismissed after the corruption investigation. The Ministers of Interior Affairs, Economic Relations, and Environment and Urbanization – Muammer Güler, Zafer Çaglayan, and Erdoğan Bayraktar, respectively – had to resign from their positions. The indictment charged high-ranked officials with significant accusations for receiving bribes: Zafer Caglayan received $52 million worth of bribes; Muammer Guler received $10 million worth of bribes; and Egemen Bağış received $1.5 million worth of bribes. The summary of proceedings were sent to the Turkish parliament for the vote on whether to lift ministers' immunity and send them to court. However, given the strong majority of Erdoğan's ruling party (AKP), in January 2015 the parliament did not lift their immunity and swept away the significant investigation.

In May 2014, Erdoğan announced that he initiated a "witch-hunt" against the Gülen movement for, as he alleged, being behind the corruption investigation. Two months after this announcement, the government arrested and detained police officials who conducted the corruption investigation. The prosecutors of the corruption investigation were also dismissed from their positions.

In June 2015, Zarrab received the Turkish Export Award jointly from the hands of Deputy Prime Minister Numan Kurtulmuş, Minister of Economy Nihat Zeybekçi, and President of the Turkish Exporters Council Mehmet Büyükekşi, in a ceremony attended by President Recep Tayyip Erdoğan.

While Erdoğan alleged that Zarrab conducted trade and business in aligned with Turkish interests, there have been several reports that suggest Zarrab's illegal activities extensively harmed the Turkish economy.

=== Arrest and prosecution in the United States, 2016 ===
On 19 March 2016, Zarrab was arrested in Miami, Florida, for conspiring to evade U.S. sanctions against Iran (by using his gold business to help Iran's government evade the sanctions), money laundering and bank fraud. He was later indicted by a grand jury with charges that could bring up to 75 years in prison. The case is being prosecuted by the U.S. Attorney for the Southern District of New York, led by Preet Bharara, with assistance from a trial attorney of the National Security Division's Counterintelligence and Export Control Section.

During the case, prosecutors have noted that Zarrab donated $4.5 million to a charity founded by Emine Erdoğan, the wife of former prime minister and now president of Turkey Recep Tayyip Erdoğan. Prosecutors stated that Zarrab has "close ties" to Erdoğan.

After Zarrab's arrest, shares in Halkbank, whose CEO was among those charged with taking bribes from Zarrab, had fallen by 20%. He has offered to pay $50 million to be granted a bail. Bail has been denied. In their brief against granting bail, prosecutors had argued that "if the defendant were able to reach Turkish soil, he could cause the highest levels of Turkish government to block his return to the United States."

In April 2017, media reported that negotiations involving the U.S. and Turkish governments were undergoing, to the effect that Zarrab would be extradited to Turkey while in return "Turkey would be much less resistant to the US’s missions in Syria, and primarily its support to the Democratic Union Party (PYD)."

One of the most striking arguments in the indictment about Zarrab was that the Zarrab family sent a letter addressed to the president of Iran's Central Bank and stated that he was ready for "Economic Jihad" against sanctions on Iran.

Erdoğan's first comment on Zarrab's arrest by the United States government was: "it was not a case that interests Turkey". However, it is claimed that Erdoğan, on 21 September 2016 during a special meeting with then Vice President Joe Biden, requested Zarrab's release from jail and prosecutor Bharara to be dismissed from his position. Also, it is claimed that Erdogan's wife, Emine Erdogan, made a similar request to Biden's wife, Jill Biden. Furthermore, Bekir Bozdag, the Turkish Minister of Justice, visited the United States Attorney General Loretta E. Lynch in October 2016 and stated how the Zarrab case was unfounded and that Zarrab should be released

In February 2017, Erdoğan agreed to a secret meeting with Zarrab's attorneys, Rudy Giuliani and former Attorney General Michael Mukasey.

Halkbank Deputy Chief Executive Mehmet Hakan Atilla, who was in connection with Zarrab, was arrested in the United States in March 2017 with the charges of "conspiring to evade US sanctions against Iran and other offenses". Afterwards, it was announced in September 2017 that the US charged then Turkish Minister of Economic Affairs Zafer Caglayan and former General Manager of Halk Bank Suleyman Aslan with offenses similar to Zarrab's.

Erdoğan appeared to be involved in the allegations about the US investigation. It was claimed that Erdogan's effort to save Zarrab was the fear that the inquiry had reached him. It is also alleged that Erdoğan wanted the US to release Zarrab in return for the detained US citizen pastor Andrew Brunson being held in a prison in Turkey.

Metin Topuz, a Turkish employee of the US Consulate General in Istanbul, was arrested on 4 October 2017 for espionage, being a member of crime network, and taking the evidences of the 2013 corruption investigation to the US. In the arrest warrant, it is emphasized that the main suspects of 17 December corruption investigation were "foreign intelligence agencies and countries."

As a response to the arrest, the US Embassy in Turkey announced on 8 October 2017, that "visa applications from Turkey were suspended."

On 16 November 2017, NBC News, reported that Zarrab is now cooperating with federal prosecutors in a money-laundering case and that he was then out of jail, a move President Erdoğan had been desperately hoping to avoid. It is thought that Zarrab is Robert Mueller's key to taking down Michael T. Flynn in the 2017 Special Counsel investigation.

In response to Zarrab's release from detention to another facility inside the United States, the Turkish government expressed concern as to the status of Zarrab. Two weeks later, Zarrab reappeared in Manhattan court as a witness in the case against Atilla, having accepted a plea deal with federal prosecutors.

A day after Zarrab testified in US Federal District Court, the Turkish government seized the assets of his and his family, including his wife Ebru Gündeş.

In October 2019, Bloomberg News claimed that President Donald Trump had in 2017 urged his then-Secretary of State Rex Tillerson to persuade the Department of Justice to drop its case against Zarrab. Access to articles about interviews his money courier Adem Karahan gave to Courthouse News Service, were banned in Turkey on 23 September 2020 by a court in Istanbul.

On April 22, 2025, the U.S. Department of the Treasury imposed sanctions on him and his network of companies for facilitating the sale of Iranian liquefied petroleum gas (LPG) in violation of U.S. sanctions. Zarrab, previously implicated in sanctions evasion schemes, is accused of using a complex network of front companies and intermediaries to export Iranian LPG, generating significant revenue for Iran's energy sector. The sanctions aim to disrupt these illicit financial networks and reinforce the U.S. commitment to enforcing sanctions against Iran's energy exports. As a result, all property and interests in property of the designated individuals and entities within U.S. jurisdiction are blocked, and U.S. persons are generally prohibited from engaging in transactions with them.

== Personal life ==
Zarrab married the Turkish singer Ebru Gündeş in 2010. They have one daughter together. Gündeş reportedly filed for divorce in September 2016, but the couple reconciled shortly afterwards. In April 2021, Gündeş again filed for divorce. Their divorce was finalized on 7 May 2021.

== See also ==
- Babak Zanjani, Iranian businessman
- Shahram Jazayeri, Iranian businessman
