= Levant (disambiguation) =

The Levant is a region in the eastern Mediterranean, including the Southern Levant.

Levant may also refer to:

== Places ==
- Levant Island, a French island in the Mediterranean
- Levant, Kansas, an unincorporated community in Thomas County, Kansas, USA
- Levant, Maine, a town in Penobscot County, Maine, USA
- Islamic State of Iraq and the Levant (ISIL), also known as ISIS and Daesh.

== Surname ==
- Alma Levant Hayden (1927–1967), born Alma Levant, American chemist
- Brian Levant (born 1952), American film and television producer, director, and writer
- Ezra Levant (born 1972), Canadian political commentator
- Germaine Levant (born 1978), Dutch footballer
- Jack LeVant (born 1999), American freestyle swimmer
- Kate Levant (born 1983), American sculptor and conceptual artist
- Oscar Levant (1906–1972), American musician, author, and actor

== Fictional characters ==
- Levant, protagonist of the video game Jade Cocoon: Story of the Tamamayu
- Levant, one of the main characters in the video game Hexyz Force

== Ships ==
- HMS Levant (1758), a 28-gun sixth rate launched in 1758 and broken up by 1780
- HMS Levant (1813), a 20-gun sixth rate launched in 1813
- USS Levant (1837), sloop-of-war in the United States Navy (1837–1860)
- USS Levant (TB-23), torpedo boat purchased by the United States in 1898 and named Manley, renamed Levant on April 11 1918

== Other uses ==
- Levant (wind), a wind in eastern Spain and southern France
- The Levant (poem), an epic poem by Mircea Cărtărescu
- Levant Company, an English company formed to trade with the Middle East
- Levant Herald, a bilingual newspaper published in the Ottoman Empire
- Levant Mine and Beam Engine, at a former tin mine in Cornwall, England
- Levant sparrowhawk, bird of prey
- Levant, an academic journal published by the Council for British Research in the Levant
- Morocco leather, also known as Levant, a soft, pliable form of leather
- Levant, the eastern tower of the Les Mercuriales twin towers in Paris, France

== See also ==
- Levante (disambiguation)
- Levanter (disambiguation)
- Levantine (disambiguation)
- Levent (name)
- Levente (disambiguation)
