= Levente (disambiguation) =

Levente (11th century) was a Hungarian noble.

Levente may also refer to:

- Levente, or Liüntika (died before 907), Hungarian chieftain
- Levente Kurucz (born 2003), Hungarian canoeist
- Levente (organization), a Hungarian paramilitary youth organization from 1921 to 1945
- Repülőgépgyár Levente II, a small Hungarian aeroplane from World War II era

== See also ==
- Levent
- Levant (disambiguation)
- Levante (disambiguation)
