= Levanter =

Levanter may refer to

- Levanter, a person who was born in the Levant, especially one of mixed European-Levantine ancestry
- Levanter (Viento de Levante), a wind that blows in the western Mediterranean Sea
- The Levanter, a novel by Eric Ambler
- Clé: Levanter, an EP by South Korean boy band Stray Kids

== See also ==
- Levant (disambiguation)
- Levante (disambiguation)
- Levantine (disambiguation)
