= Mehmet V. Saçaklıoğlu =

Turkish politician

Mehmet Saçaklıoğlu
- Born: 8 January 1982 (age 44); Istanbul, Turkey
- Citizenship: Turkish
- Education: Taras Shevchenko National University of Kyiv
- Occupation: entrepreneur

Mehmet V. Saçaklıoğlu (January 8, 1982, Istanbul, Turkey) is a Turkish politician, former member of the Grand National Assembly of Turkey.

== Biography ==
Saçaklıoğlu was born on January 8, 1982, in Istanbul, Turkey, into a business family.

Mehmet Saçaklıoğlu is a third-generation representative of the Saçaklıoğlu family. He started his career in the family business in Istanbul.

Mehmet Saçaklıoğlu was elected as a member of the Grand National Assembly of Turkey in the general elections held on 24 June 2018, representing Istanbul. In parliament, he championed digital transformation and economic reform by supporting initiatives to modernize Turkey’s digital infrastructure and promote bilateral economic cooperation with Ukraine. In 2017-2019, he was a member of the Foreign Economic Relations Board of Turkey (DEIK). Since 2019, a board member at the International Turkish Ukrainian Businessmen Association (TUID). Since 2021, a member of the Congress of the Fenerbahçe football club and the 1907 Fenerbahçe Association. In 2019, he founded the investment and development company "Bosphorus Development", specializing in the construction of residential complexes, offices, business centers, hotels, and shopping centers in Turkey, Ukraine, and internationally. In October 2022, "Bosphorus Development" led by Saçaklioğlu was part of the delegation representing Ukraine at the Real Estate Fair and Conference in Munich.

=== Private life ===
Saçaklıoğlu is married and has two daughters.

=== Philanthropy ===
Since 2022, Bosphorus Development has been supporting the Ukrainian military purchasing and donating cars, helmets, body armor, thermal imaging cameras, and medical supplies during the Russian invasion of Ukraine. Saçaklıoğlu has organized rehabilitation programs for Ukrainian children at the İstanbul Aquarium in Turkey. Also, more than 150 Ukrainians received shelter and support at the Crowne Plaza Istanbul Florya hotel, which was built and is owned by a group of family companies affiliated to the Saçaklıoğlu family.
