= Levent =

- Neighbourhood
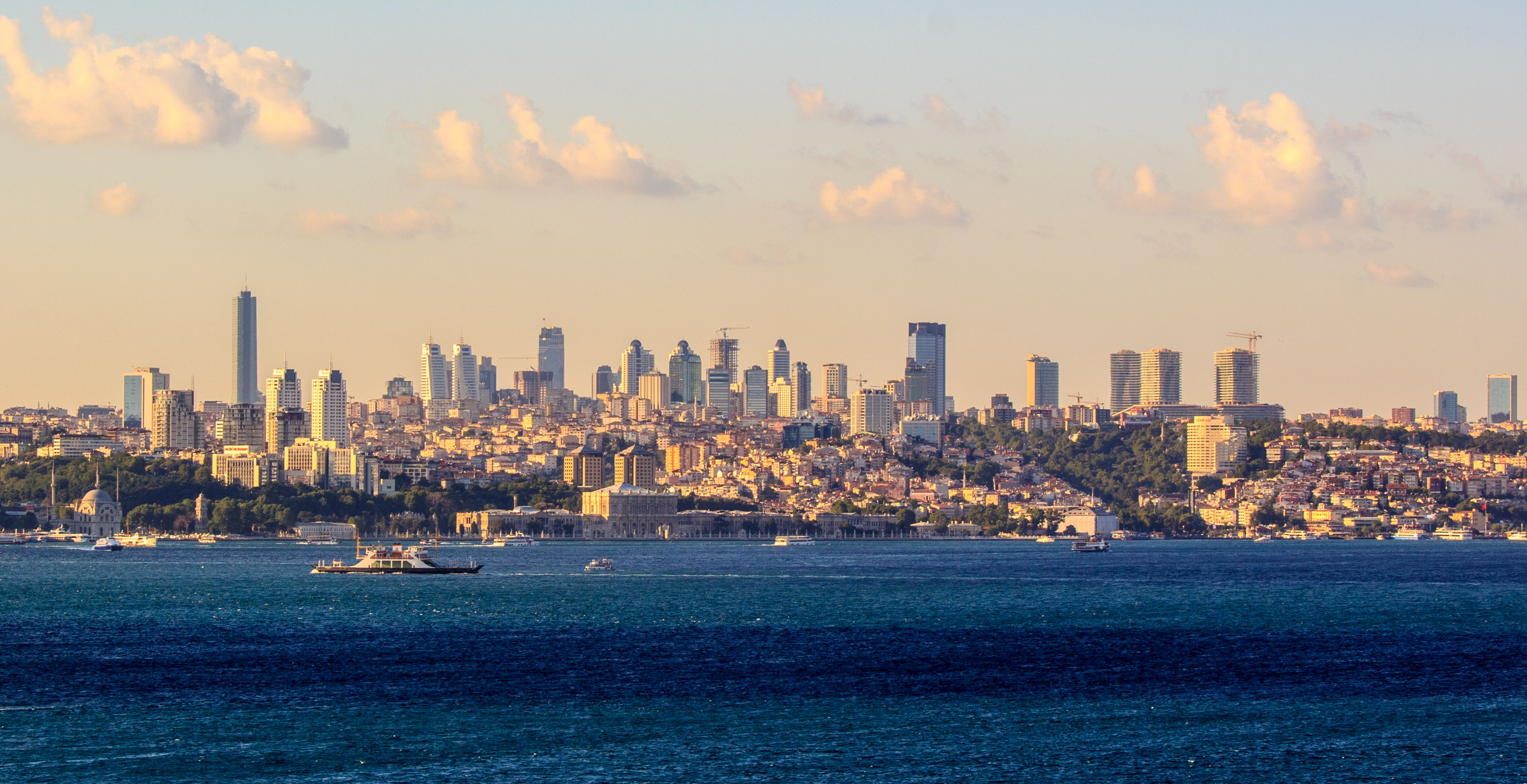
- A distant view of Levent's skyline from the Bosphorus strait in Istanbul

- Location within Turkey Location within Istanbul
- Coordinates: 41.08181°N 29.01584°E
- Country: Turkey
- Province: Istanbul
- District: Beşiktaş
- Population (2022): 2,911
- Time zone: UTC+3 (TRT)

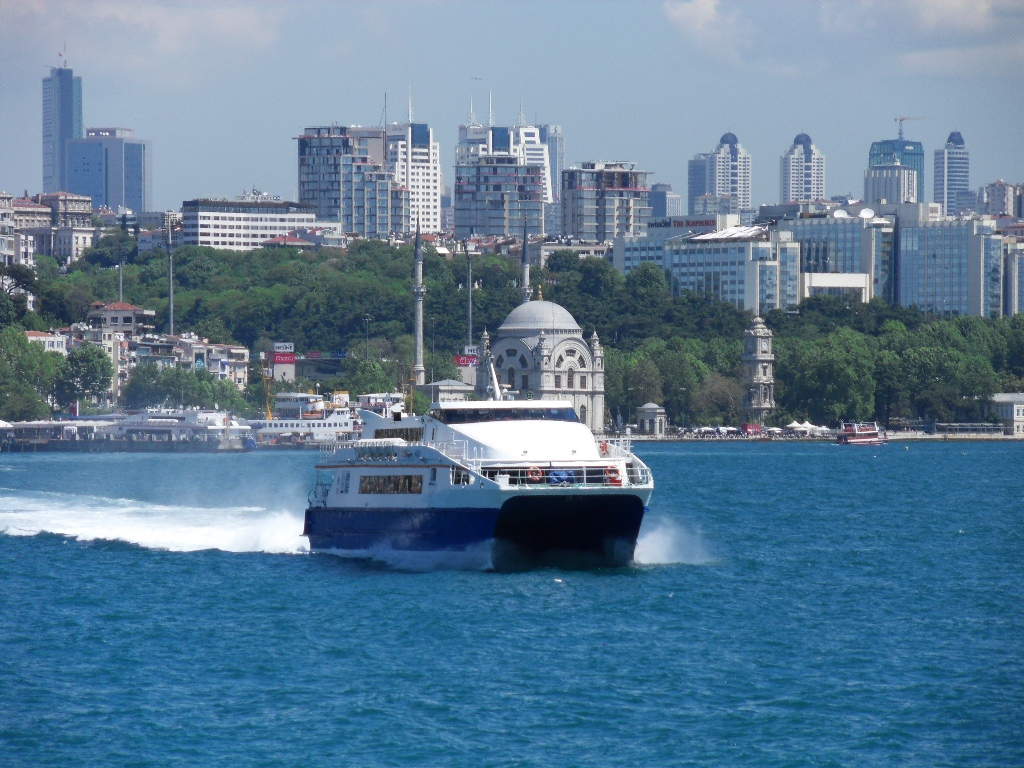
A catamaran Seabus on the Bosphorus, with the skyline of Levent in the background. Istanbul Sapphire is the first tower at left.

Levent is a neighbourhood in the municipality and district of Beşiktaş, Istanbul Province, Turkey. Its population is 2,911 (2022). It is one of the main business districts of Istanbul located on the European side of the city. It is situated to the north of the Golden Horn, at the western shore of the Bosphorus strait.

Levent, together with nearby Maslak, is one of the main business districts on the European side of the city, where numerous skyscraper projects are currently under construction or in the planning phase. One of the modern skyline clusters of the city is located here, hidden behind the hills of the Bosphorus and not disturbing the atmosphere of the historical peninsula of Istanbul, which is at quite a distance.

The tallest skyscraper in Levent is the 54-floor Istanbul Sapphire, which has a roof height of 238 metres (261 metres including its spire). It was Istanbul's and Turkey's tallest skyscraper between 2010 and 2016 — as of 2020, it is the 4th tallest skyscraper in Istanbul and Turkey, behind Metropol Istanbul Tower 1 (70 floors / 301 metres including its twin spires) in the Ataşehir district on the Asian side of the city; and Skyland Istanbul Towers 1 and 2 (2 x 70 floors / 293 metres), located adjacent to Türk Telekom Stadium in the Seyrantepe quarter of the Sarıyer district, on the European side.

The stations Levent and 4. Levent along the M2 line of the Istanbul Metro serve the Levent business district and its surrounding neighbourhoods.

== Etymology ==
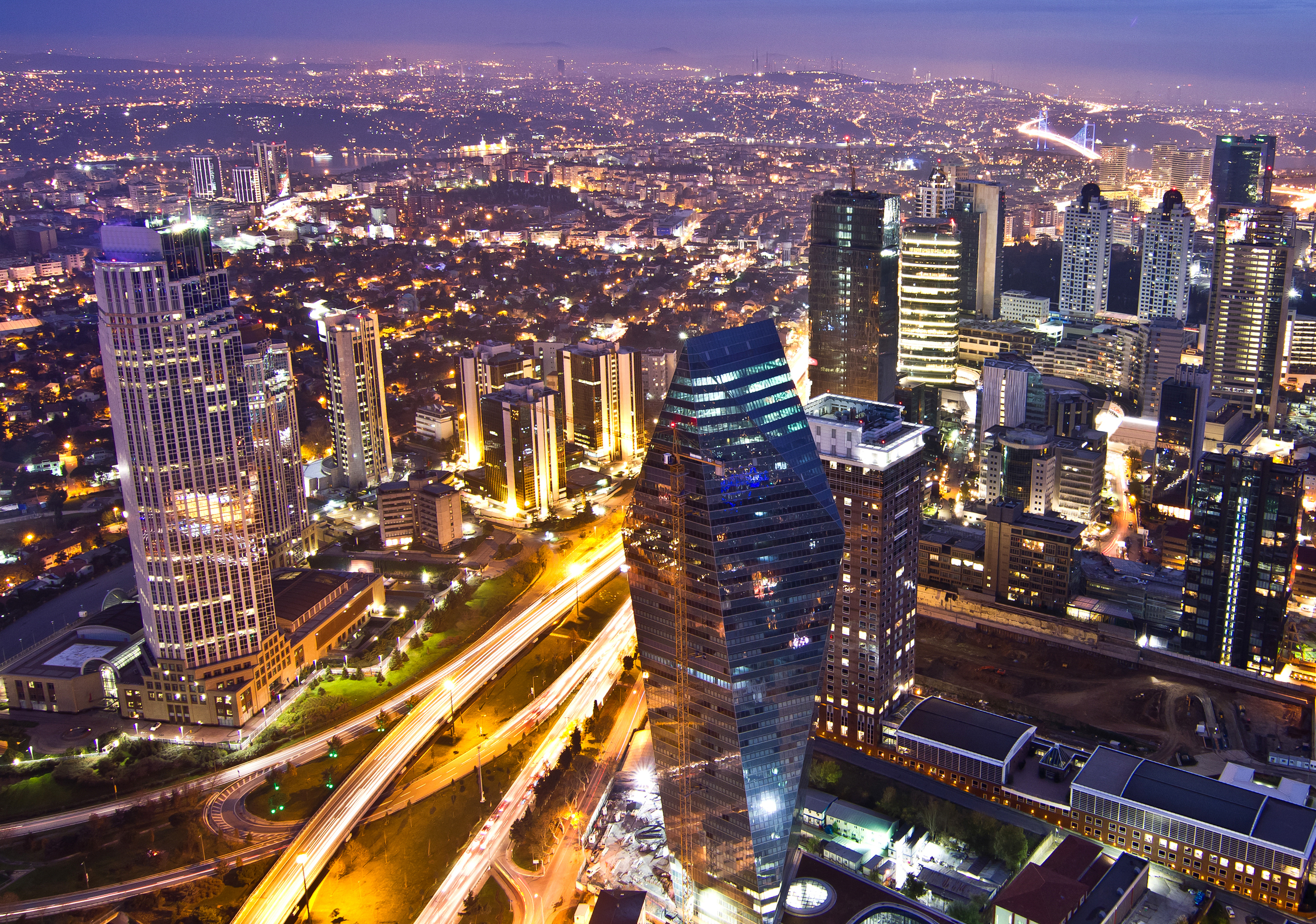
View of Büyükdere Avenue in Levent at night, from the observation deck of Istanbul Sapphire.

Levent is also a name for men in Turkey (cf. Levent) that derives from the Levend, a type of soldier (naval infantry) of the Ottoman Navy. Levend itself is derived from Levantino (Levantine) which means Person from the Levant (East Mediterranean) in Italian. This was how the Italians (the Genoese and Venetians) used to call the Ottoman sailors, a name which was also adopted by the Ottoman Turks. The use of the word levend for describing seamen first appeared in the Ottoman Turkish language during the 16th century. These marine soldiers had the reputation of possessing strong, muscular physiques and daring, fearless characters; which is the reason why the Turkish word levent, its Greek cognate levénti (λεβέντη) and its Bulgarian cognate levént (левент) are still popularly used for defining "athletic, gallant, brave" men.

The name Levent (Levend) came to be applied to the neighbourhood because in 1780 the Ottoman Fleet Admiral Cezayirli Gazi Hasan Pasha was awarded a farmland here by the Ottoman Sultan Abdülhamid I; and in the early 19th century a military compound was built in the area of this farm. The nearby İstinye neighbourhood on the European shoreline of the Bosphorus also featured an important shipyard and dock for maintaining and repairing the military vessels of the Ottoman Navy. However, the Imperial Arsenal (Tersâne-i Âmire) and the Naval Ministry (Bahriye Nezareti) of the Ottoman Navy were located on the shores of the Golden Horn.

== History ==
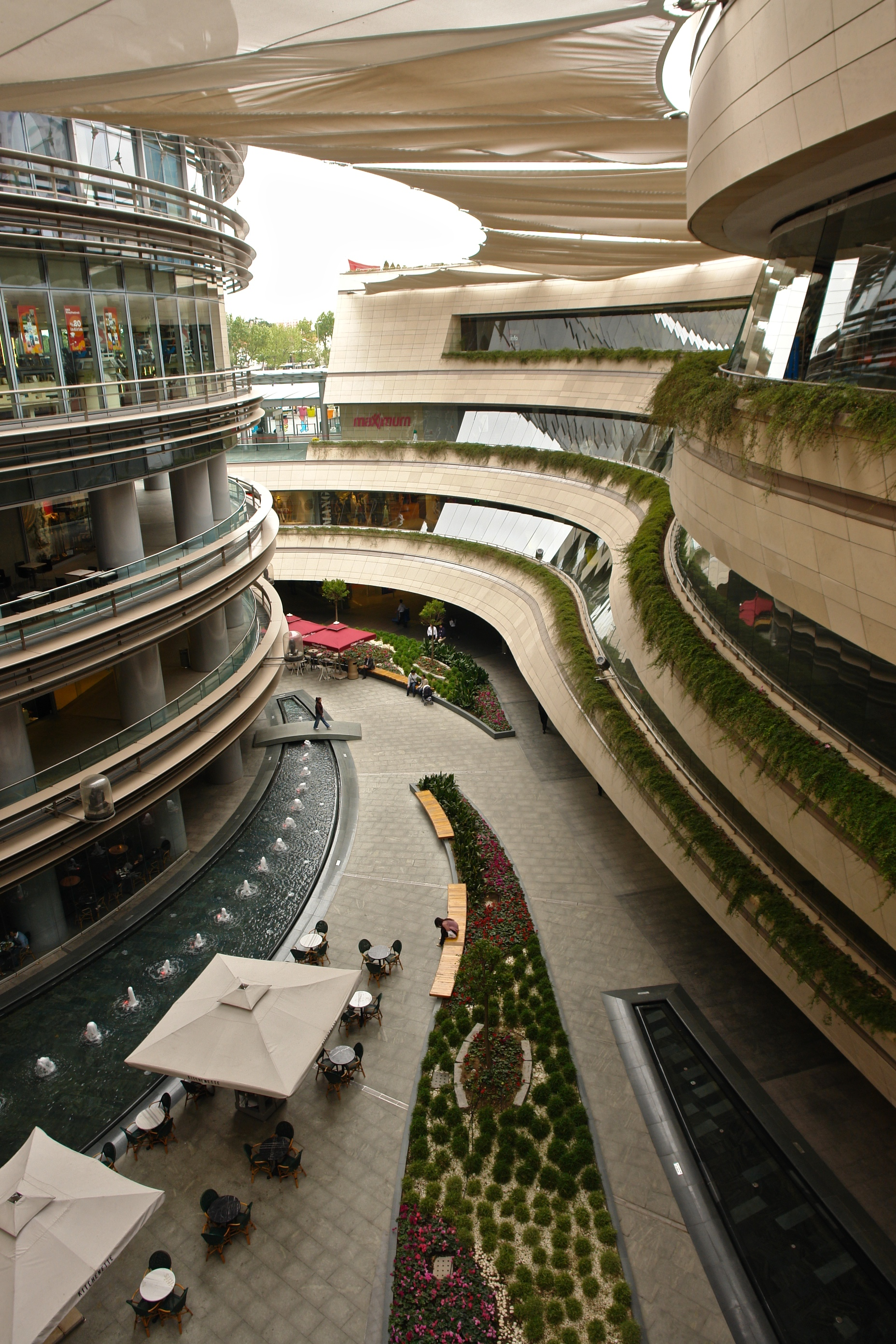
Kanyon Towers & Mall on Büyükdere Avenue in Levent.

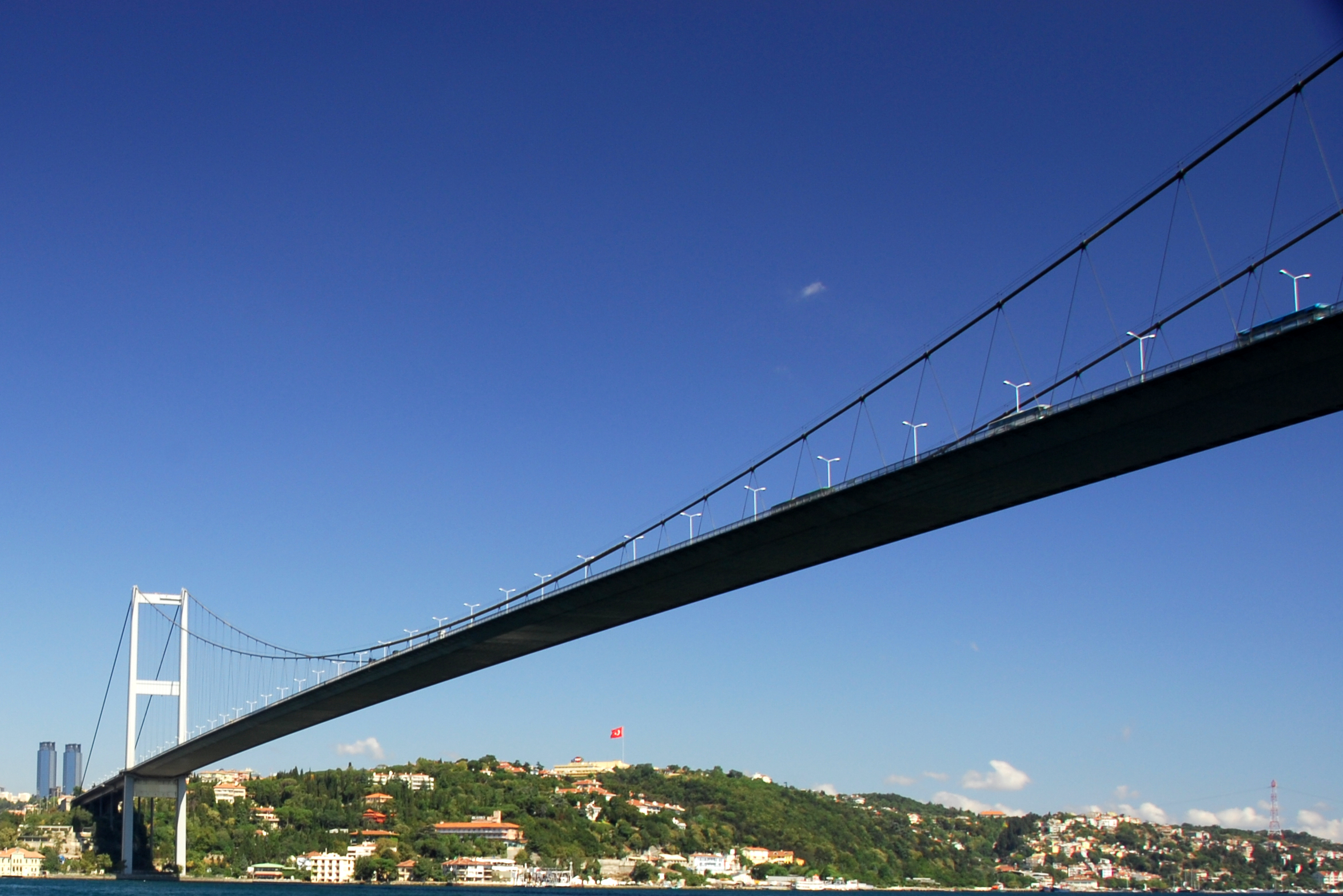
Heading towards Levent through the Bosphorus Bridge (1973), the oldest of three suspension bridges and two tunnels which connect Istanbul's Asian and European sides.

In the early 19th century, during the final years of the reign of Sultan Selim III, the first military compound of the Nizam-ı Cedid (New Order) Army was built in Levent; which was then known as the Levend(Levent) Çiftliği (Levend Farmlands), eventually becoming known as the Levend(Levent) Kışlası (Levend Barracks).

In 1868, during the first territorial organization of the Istanbul Municipality, Levend (Levent) was placed within the district of Beşiktaş (which was designated as the 7th Area of the Istanbul Municipality), having remained within this district ever since.

The modern neighbourhood of Levent was formed in 1947, when Emlak Kredi Bankası (a Turkish bank which was established to finance housing projects) chose the Levent area for constructing a well-planned residential compound, formed mostly of villa type houses with gardens. After the completion of the first phase of the Levent project in 1960, numerous other residential compounds were constructed in the area, eventually extending towards nearby Etiler.

Starting from the late 1980s and early 1990s, with initial projects such as the Sabancı Center, Yapı Kredi Towers, TAT Towers, Metrocity Towers and İş Bankası Towers, Levent became a popular location for constructing new skyscrapers, mostly owned by Turkish banks and conglomerates. One of the city's major skyline clusters (together with those of Maslak and Şişli on the European side; and Ataşehir and Kozyatağı on the Asian side of Istanbul) is located in Levent. At present, Levent hosts the tallest skyscraper of Istanbul and Turkey, the 54-floor Istanbul Sapphire; while the construction of numerous new mixed-use skyscraper projects and shopping malls are ongoing in the neighbourhood, which has evolved into a central business district.

== Image gallery ==
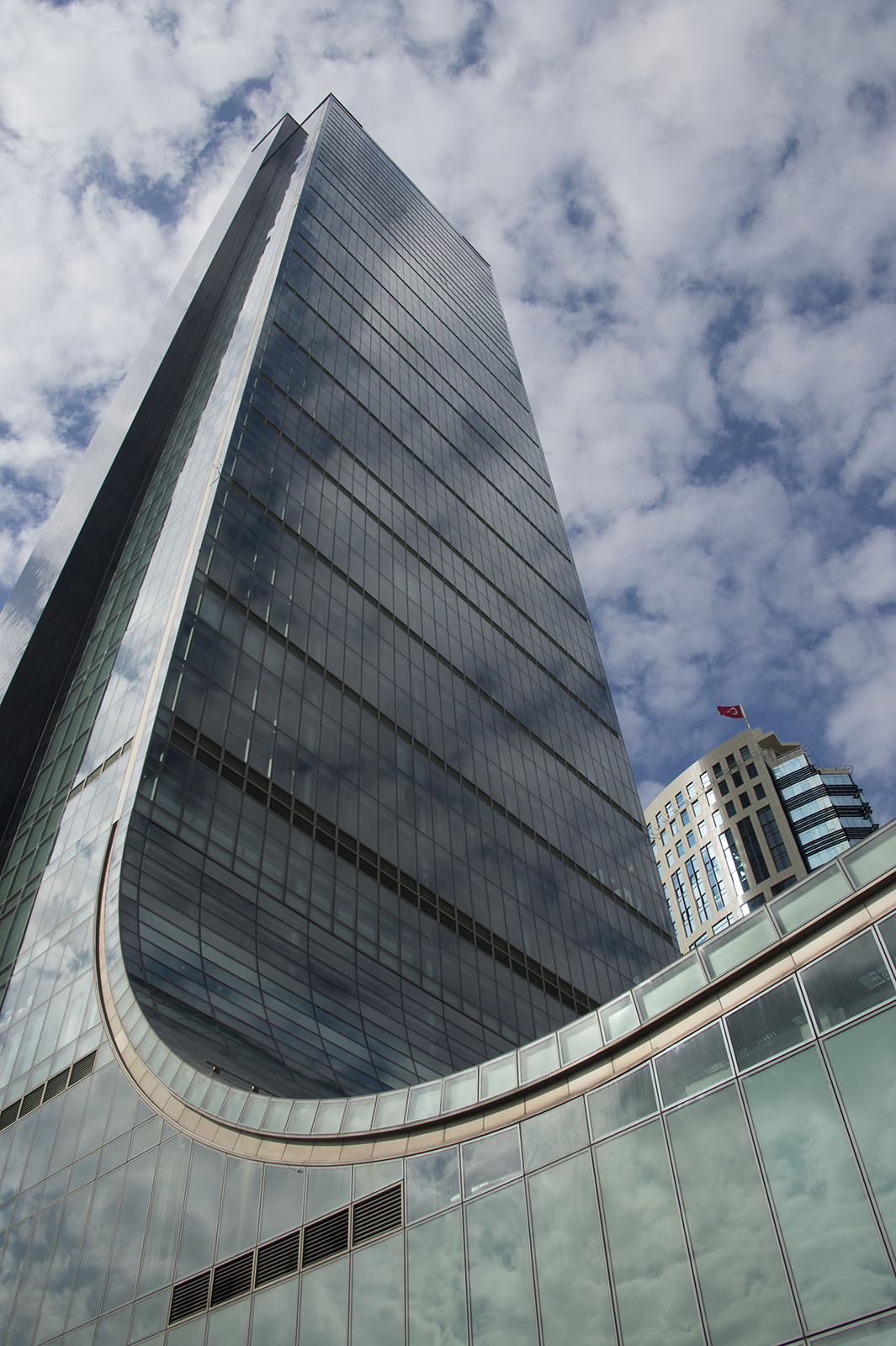
Istanbul Sapphire is currently the tallest skyscraper in Levent

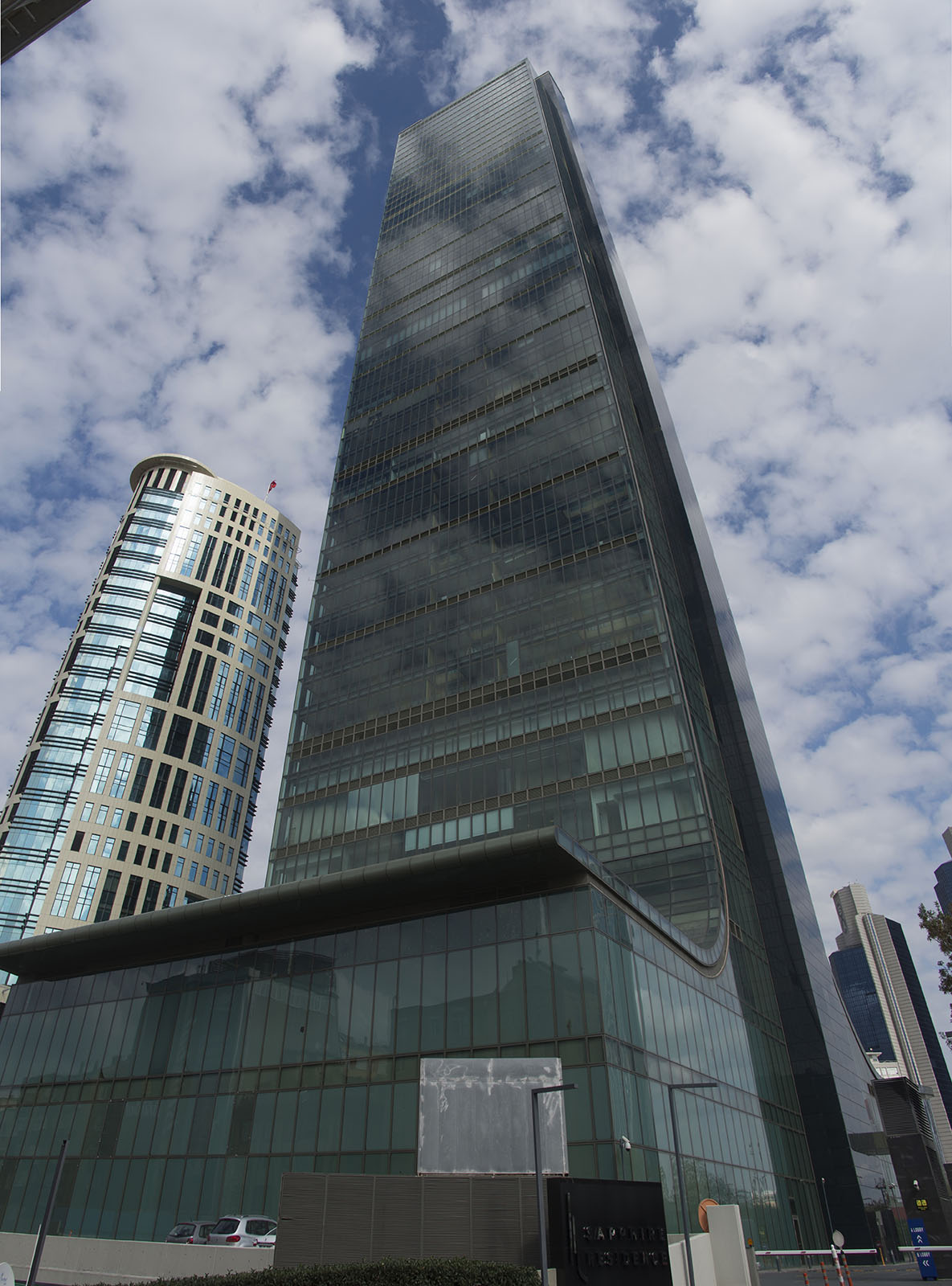
Rear facade of Istanbul Sapphire in Levent

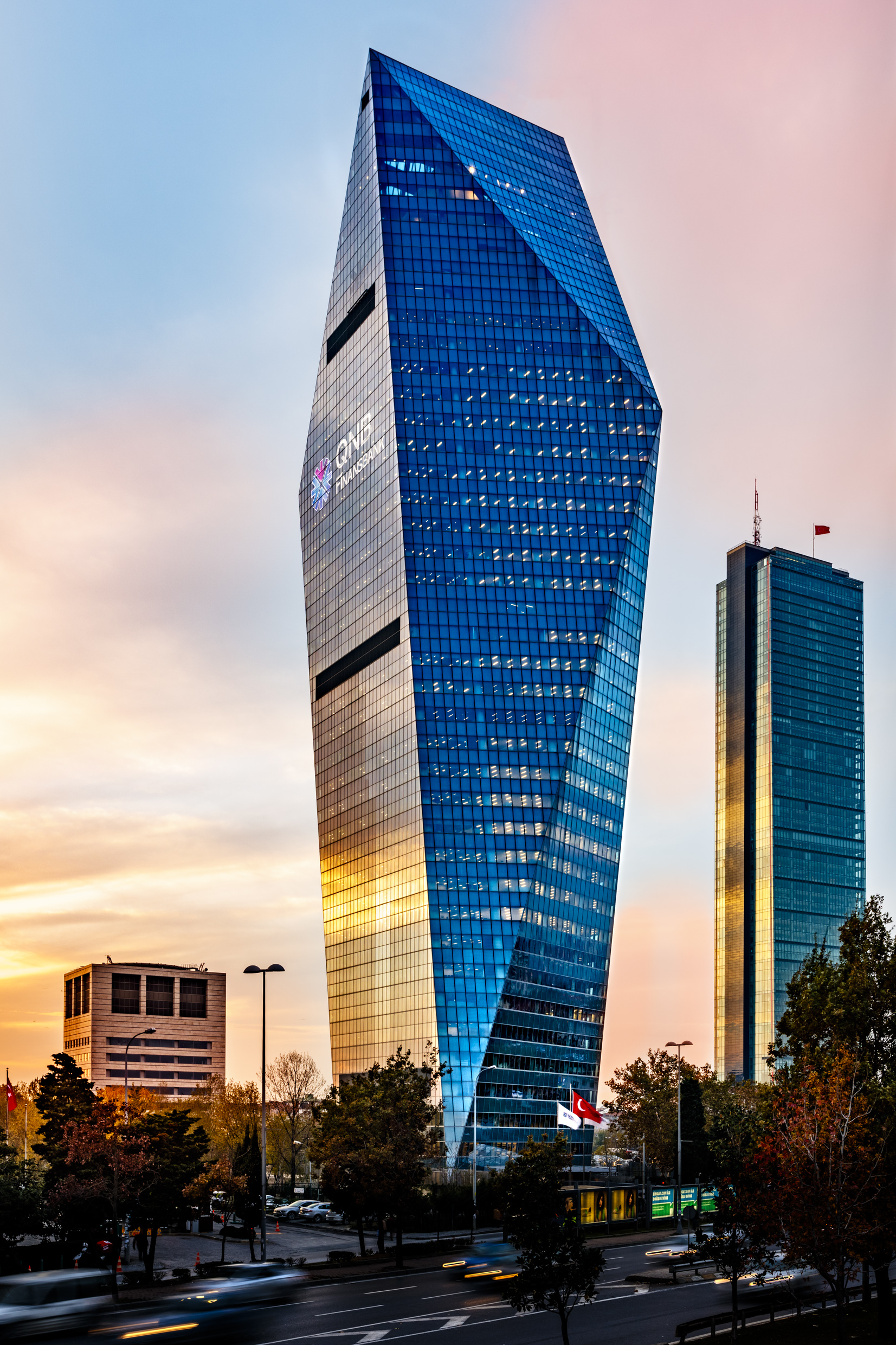
Finansbank Tower and Istanbul Sapphire on Büyükdere Avenue

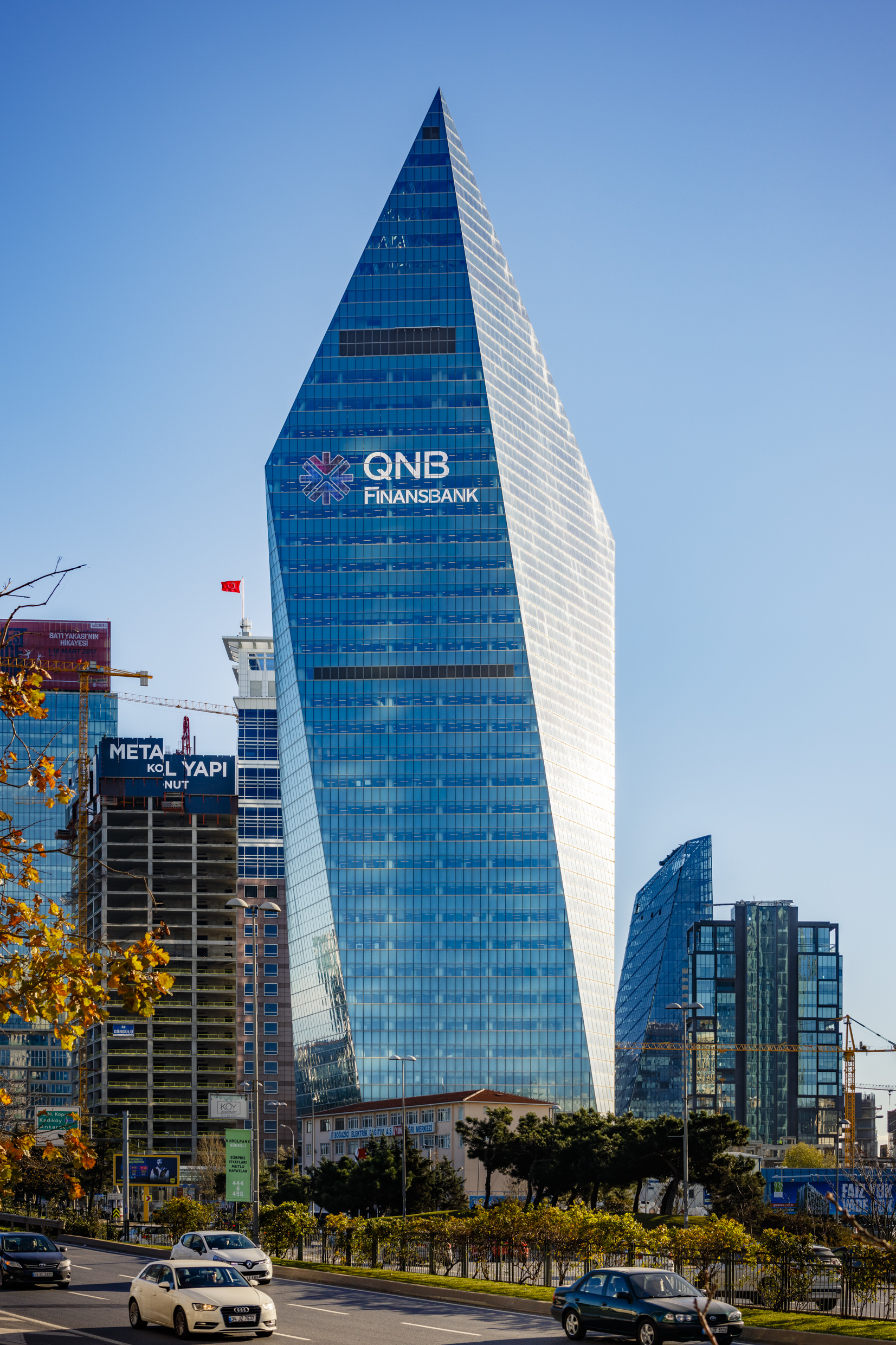
Finansbank Tower on Büyükdere Avenue

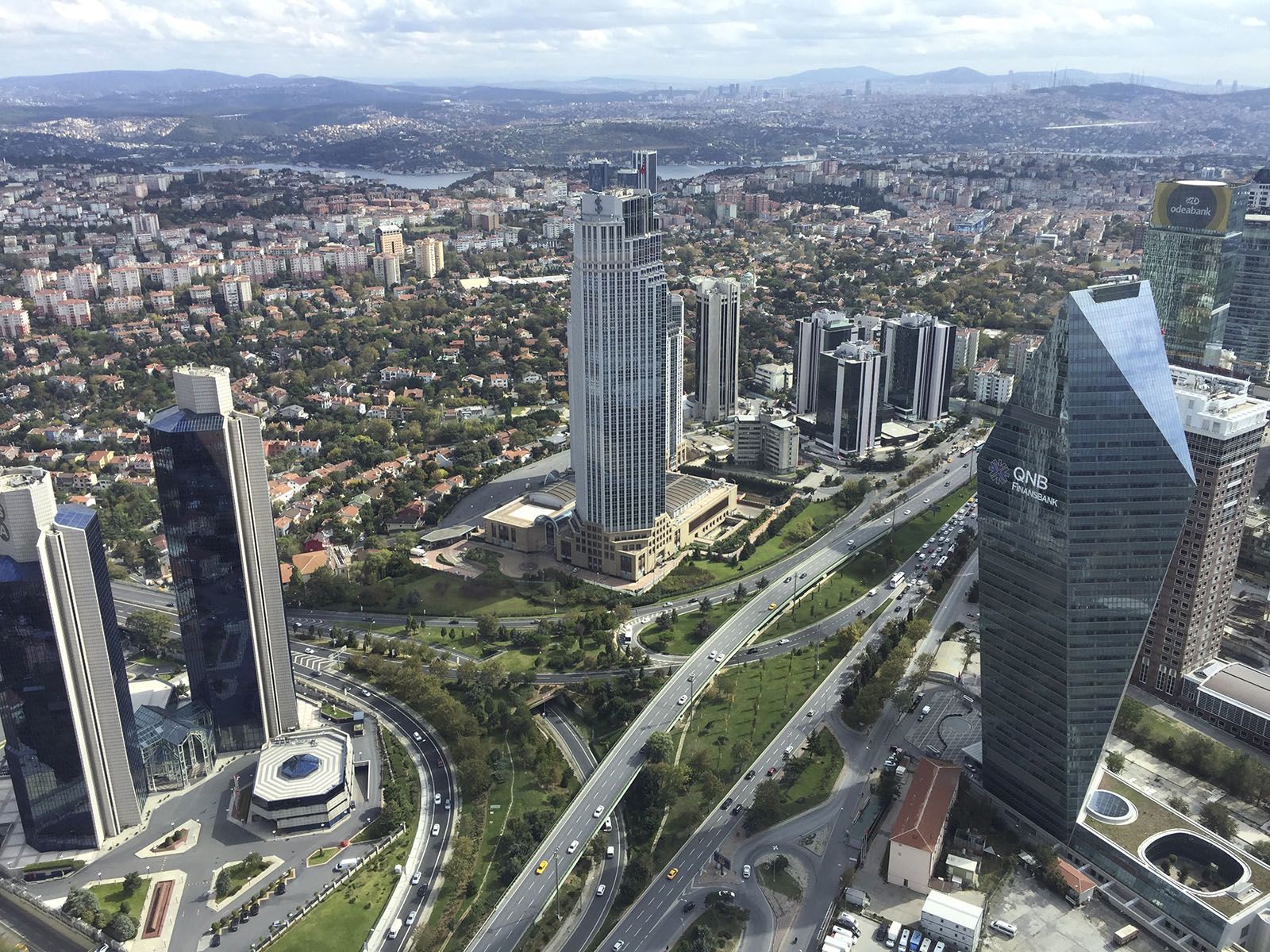
Sabancı Center, İşbank and Finansbank towers viewed from the roof of Istanbul Sapphire

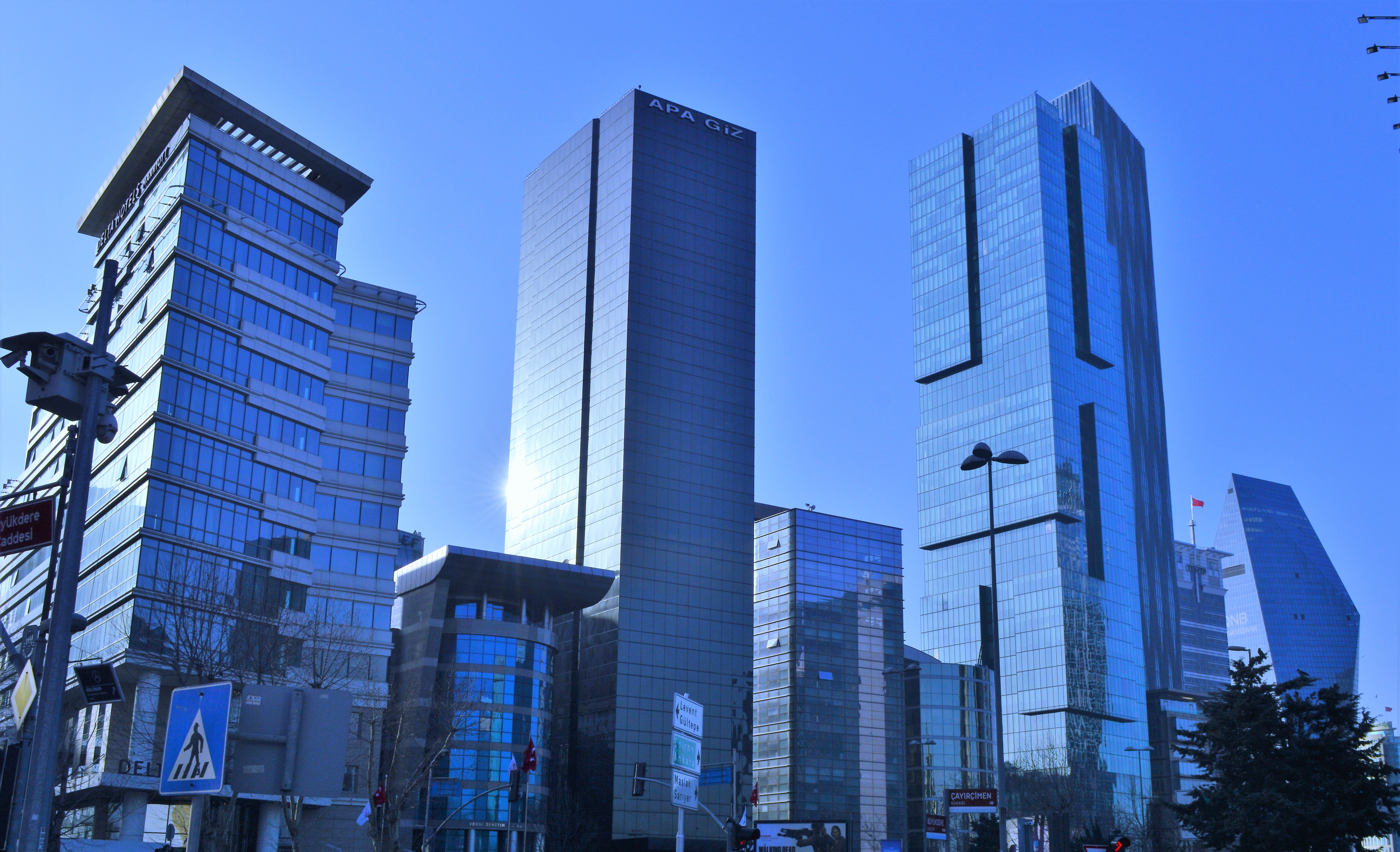
A view of Büyükdere Avenue in Levent

Kanyon Mall on Büyükdere Avenue

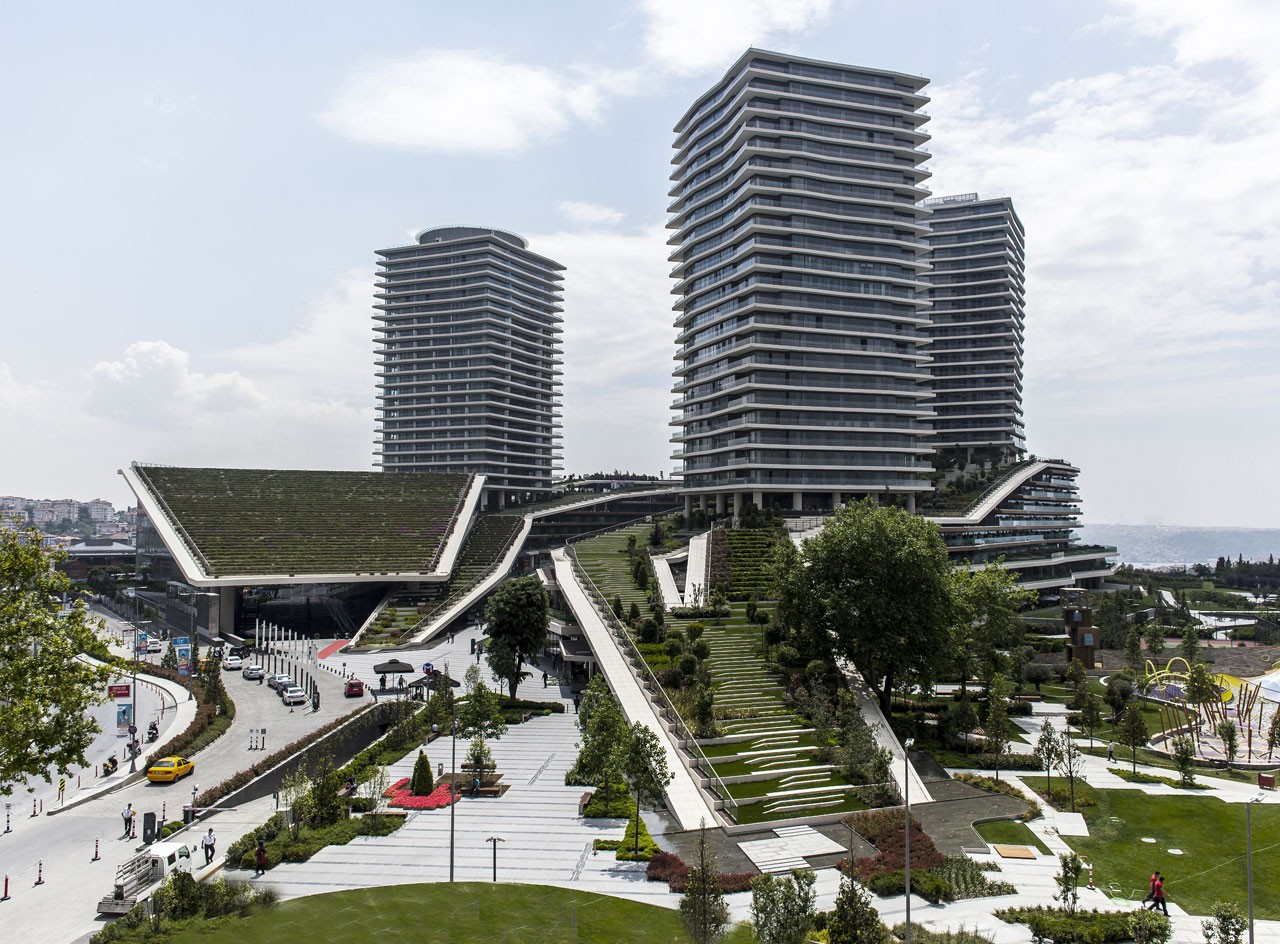
Zorlu Center on Büyükdere Avenue

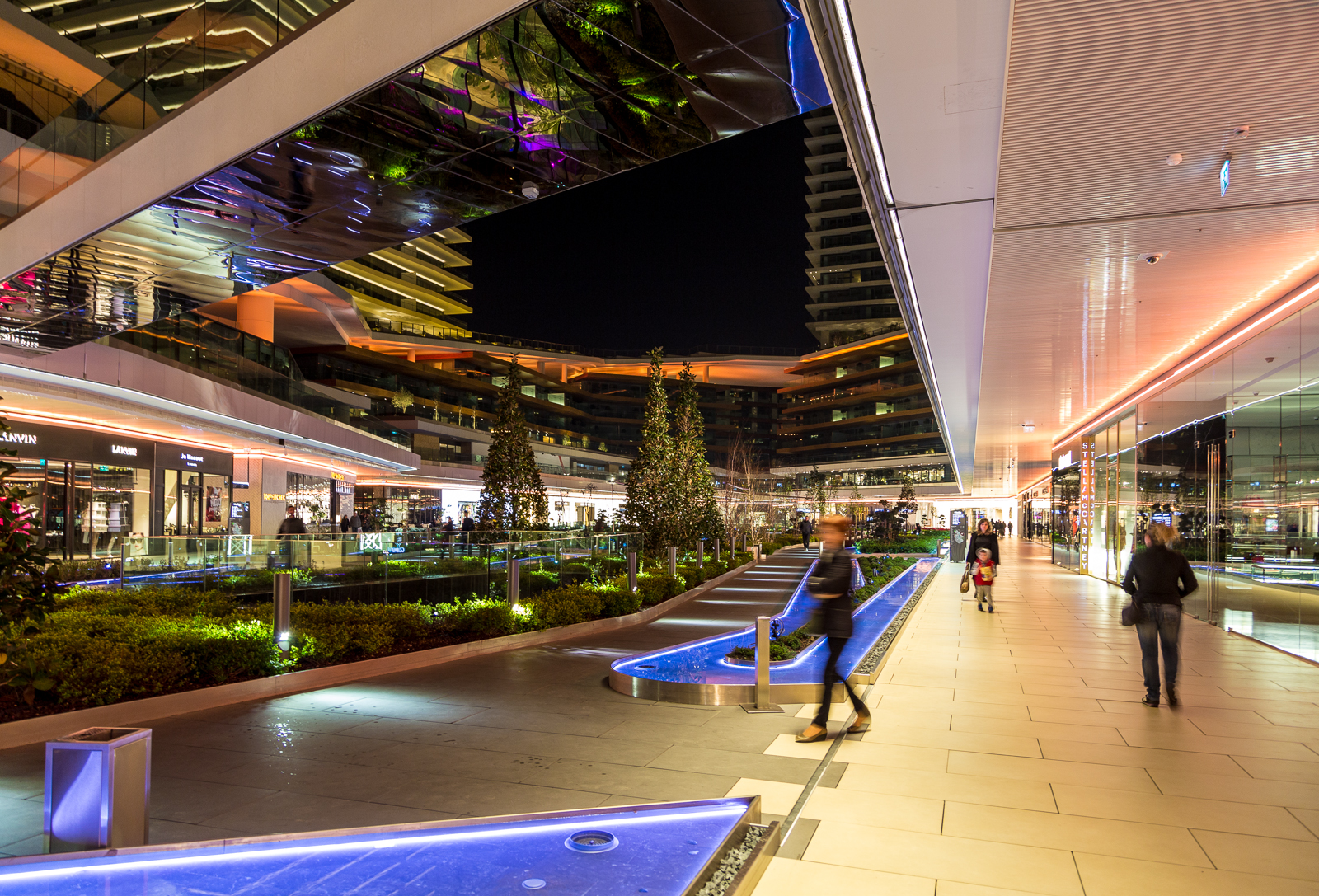
Zorlu Center on Büyükdere Avenue

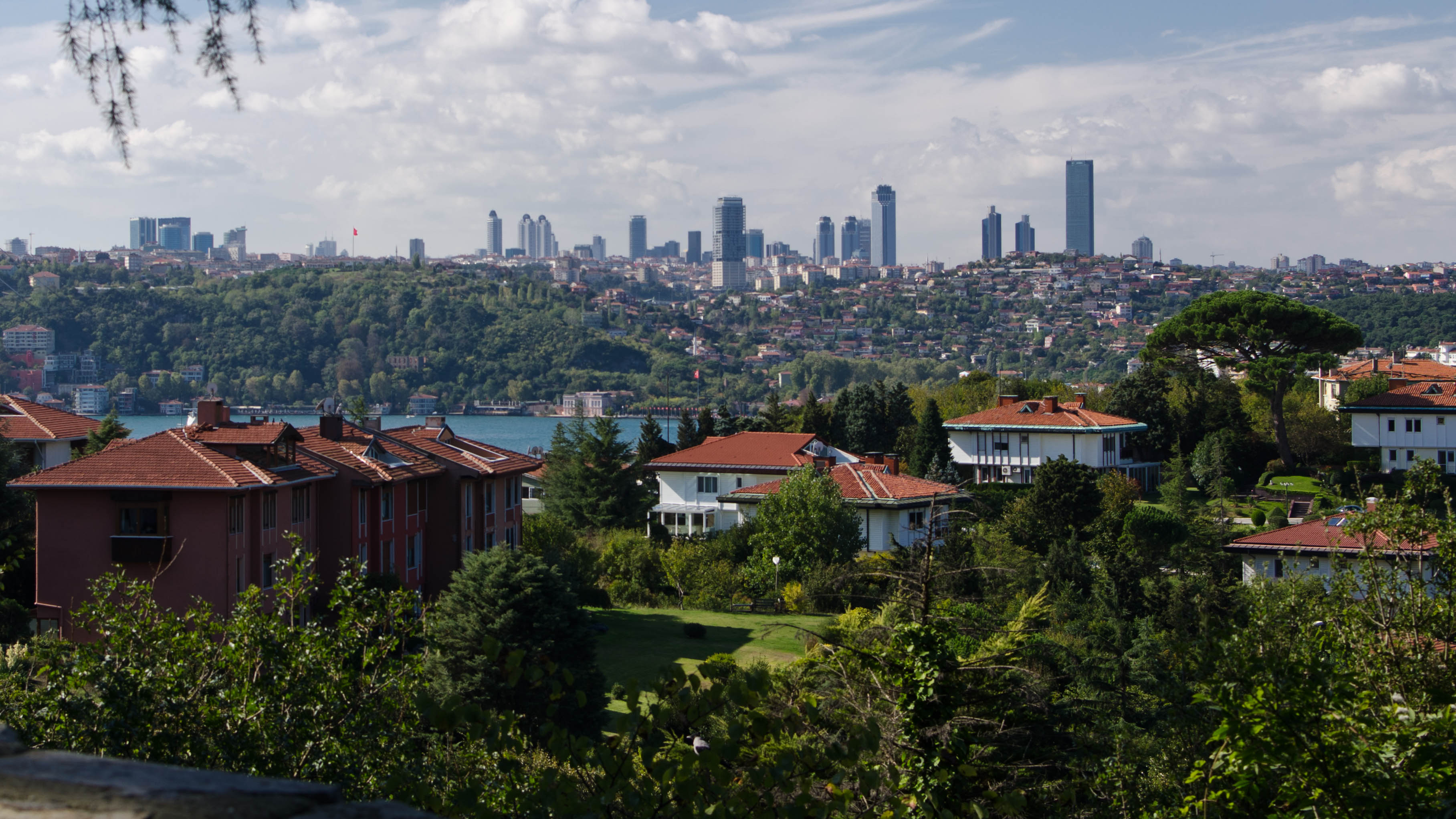
A view of Levent from Kanlıca Hekimler Sitesi across the Bosporus strait

== Panoramic view ==
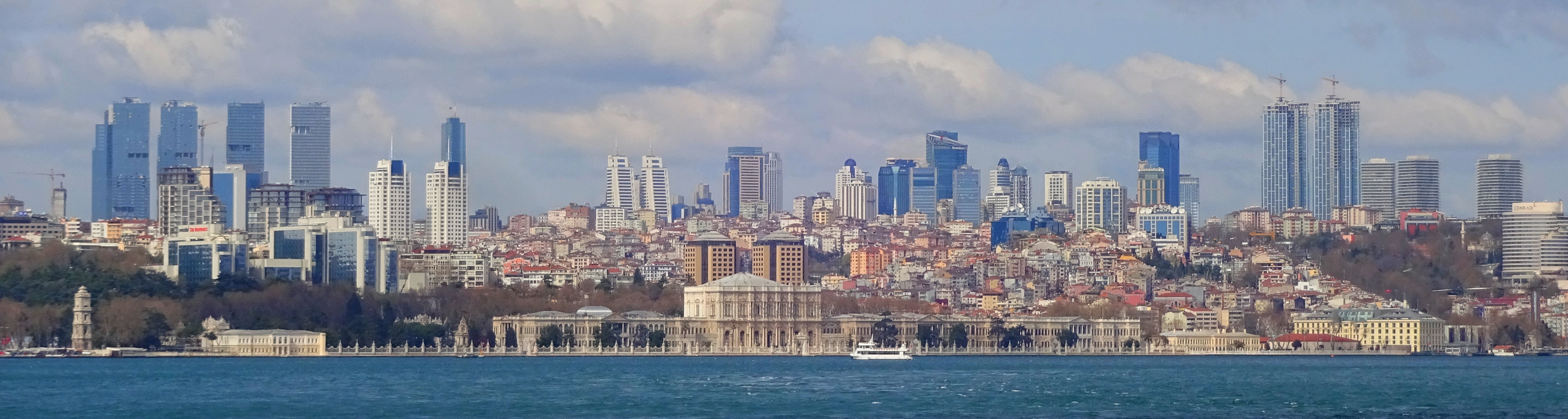
A panoramic view of Dolmabahçe Palace and the skyline of Levent from the Bosphorus

== See also ==
- Maslak
- Bankalar Caddesi
- Istanbul International Finance Center
- List of tallest buildings in Istanbul
- List of tallest buildings in Turkey
- Architecture of Turkey
