= BOSPHORUS Development =

- Type: Joint-stock company
- Industry: Investment and development
- Founded: 1930s
- Headquarters: Istanbul, Turkey
- Key people: Mehmet Vahit Saçaklıoğlu
- Website: https://bosphorusdevelopment.com/

BOSPHORUS Development is an investment and development company, which is among the top ten developers in Turkey. The company specializes in the construction of residential complexes, offices, business centers, hotels and shopping and entertainment centers.

Among its projects is Istanbul Tower 205 skyscraper and Istanbul Aquarium.

== History ==
The history of the company dates back to the 1930s, when Vahdettin Saçaklıoğlu and Ayşe Saçaklıoğlu founded a family business in Turkey. In the beginning, the company was engaged in retail and agriculture.

In 1955, Hüseyin Saçaklıoğlu and Ibrahim Halil Saçaklıoğlujoined the company. Later, the company was headed by Ömer Saçaklıoğlu, under whose leadership the company achieved its greatest development.

The company began to engage in other types of business activities, including opening a chain of grocery stores, restaurants and bakeries, manufacturing furniture, textiles, selling jewelry, as well as gas supply and oil products trading.

Since 1970, the business has focused on the construction of residential and commercial real estate. In particular, it built its first property, Nur Apartmanı, in the city of Şanlıurfa in eastern Turkey.

In 2011, the group of companies realized Istanbul Aquarium, one of the world's largest themed aquariums with a total area of 23 thousand square meters. In 2012, the company built the Aqua Florya Mall next to the aquarium and three years later the Crowne Plaza Istanbul Florya hotel. Aqua Florya Mall won several major awards including the contest «Architectural Symbols of the City», organized by Hürriyet newspaper in Turkey.

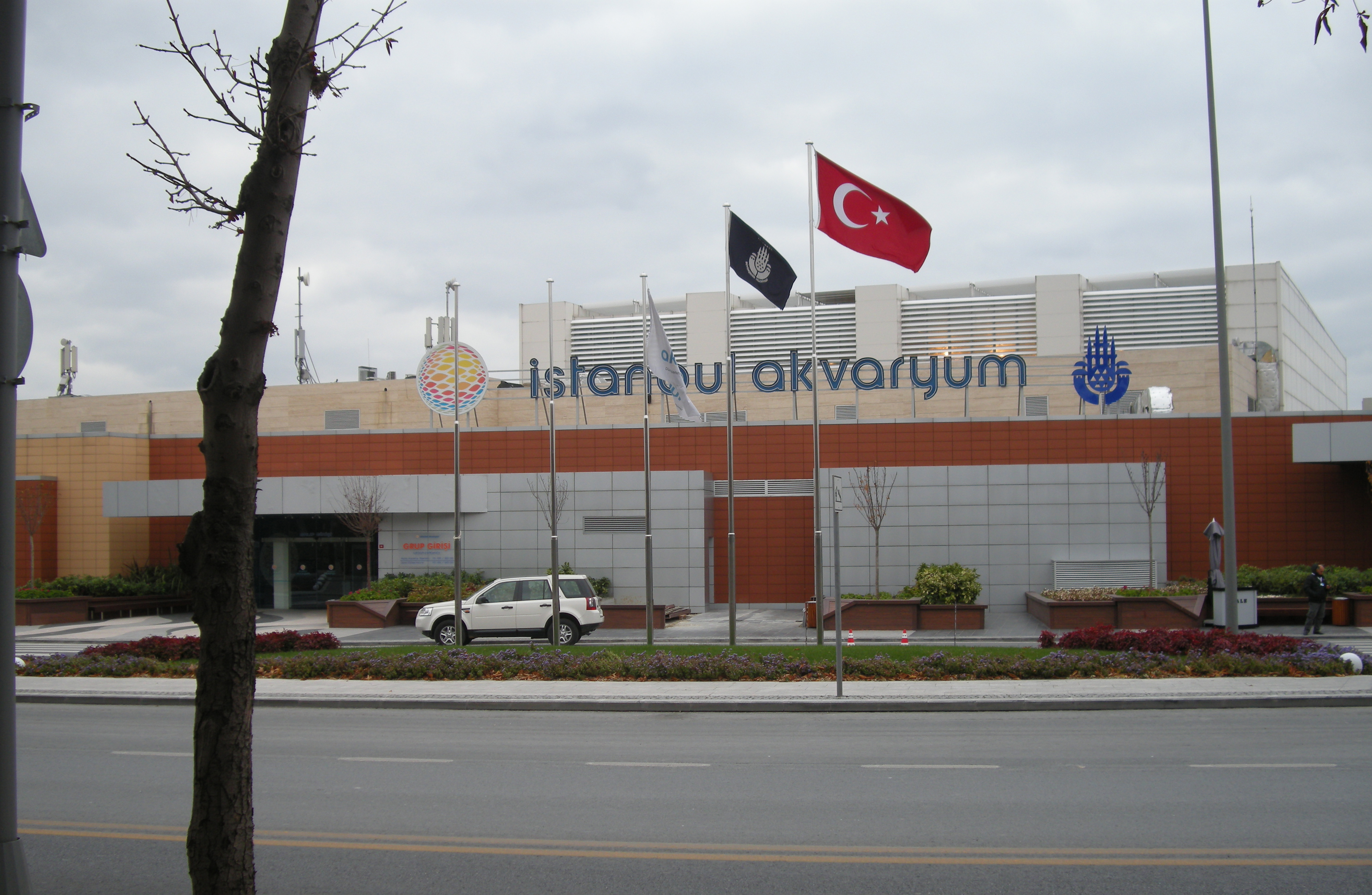
Istanbul Aquarium

In 2019, the joint-stock company BOSPHORUS Development was founded in Ukraine. Mehmet Vahit Saçaklıoğlu, a representative of the third generation of the Saçaklıoğlu family, became the founder and chairman of the supervisory board of the company.

Also in 2019, the Istanbul Tower 205 skyscraper was built, which is the tallest office building in Turkey. Metal Yapı Konut and Yesil GYO (a real estate investment fund) were the investors and developers of the project, and Skidmore, Owings & Merrill (SOM) was responsible for the implementation of architectural solutions.

Istanbul Tower 205 received the «Best Office in Progress» award in the «Sign of the City» competition from the Hürriyet newspaper and the European Property Awards in two categories: «Best Commercial Tall Building» and «Best Office Development».

In April 2021, the Ukrainian creative agency Brain Tank created a new identity for BOSPHORUS Development.

In 2022, BOSPHORUS Development focused on its first project in Kyiv. However, in connection with the full-scale Russian invasion of Ukraine, the company suspended construction work and directed its efforts to humanitarian aid.

In October 2022, BOSPHORUS Development was part of the delegation representing Ukraine at Expo Real in Munich.

On May 11, 2023, the architectural and construction business forum «Rebuilding the country. A strategy of change for architects, developers and builders», where BOSPHORUS Development acted as a partner of the event, which brought together more than 4,000 guests.

In June 2023, in partnership with RIEL company BOSPHORUS Development started building the first residential complex of business class Maxima Residence in Pechersk district of Kyiv, Ukraine.
