= Levante =

Levante may refer to:

== People ==
- Levante (singer) (born 1987), Italian pop singer-songwriter
- LeVante Bellamy (born 1996), American football player

== Places ==
- Levante, Spain, the eastern Iberian coastal region of Spain
- Riviera di Levante, an Italian name for the eastern section of the Italian Riviera
- Sestri Levante, an Italian town

== Sports ==
- Levante FC, a former Spanish football club
- Levante UD, a Spanish football club

== Transportation ==
- Levante Ferries, a Greek ferry company
- Caetano Levante, a Portuguese wheelchair-accessible coach
- Maserati Levante, an Italian mid-size luxury SUV
- Suzuki Vitara, a Japanese subcompact SUV also sold as the Mazda Proceed Levante

== Other uses ==
- Power Alley (Levante), a 2023 Brazilian drama film
- Levante (hosiery), an Italian marketer and manufacturer of hosiery
- Levante-EMV, a newspaper from the Valencian Community, Spain

== See also ==
- Levant, region in the eastern Mediterranean, variously defined.
- Levant (disambiguation)
- Levanter (disambiguation)
- Levantine (disambiguation)
