= Leventis =

Leventis (Λεβέντης) is a Greek word for describing a brave man, derived from the Greek name for the Levant. Because nt is pronounced /nd/ in Greek, the name is sometimes spelled Levendis. The etymology of Leventis is given in the Oxford Dictionary of American Family Names:

From Italian levanti ‘Levantine’, ‘people from the East’, i.e. the eastern Mediterranean, also in Greek the term has connotations of fearlessness and gallantry. It is also a reduced form of surnames with Levento- as a prefix, e.g. Leventogiannis ‘John the gallant’.

— Dictionary of American Family Names, Oxford University Press, ISBN 0-19-508137-4

Alternatively, it may originate from the Turkish word Levend.

== Contemporary Meaning ==
In contemporary Greek, "levendis" means a handsome and gallant male.

== People ==
Here is a partial list of people named Leventis or Levendis:

- Anastasios George Leventis (1902–1978), Greek-Cypriot businessman and dominant figure in the economy of many West African countries and especially Nigeria. Held the title of Babalaje of Egbaland
- Andrew G. Leventis (born 1980), American painter and professor
- Constantine Leventis (1938–2002), Greek Cypriot businessman and philanthropist
- George Levendis, TV and music industry executive
- Phil P. Leventis (born 1945), American politician
- Vassilis Leventis (1951–2026), Greek politician

In Harlan Ellison's short story The Man Who Rowed Christopher Columbus Ashore, each of the vignettes that comprise the story are preceded by "LEVENDIS":

== Sports ==
The Nigerian football team Leventis United is named after the A. G. Leventis foundation created by Anastasios G. Leventis.
