= Repülőgépgyár Levente II =

Type of aircraft

Levente I - II; (Postwar: Strucc)
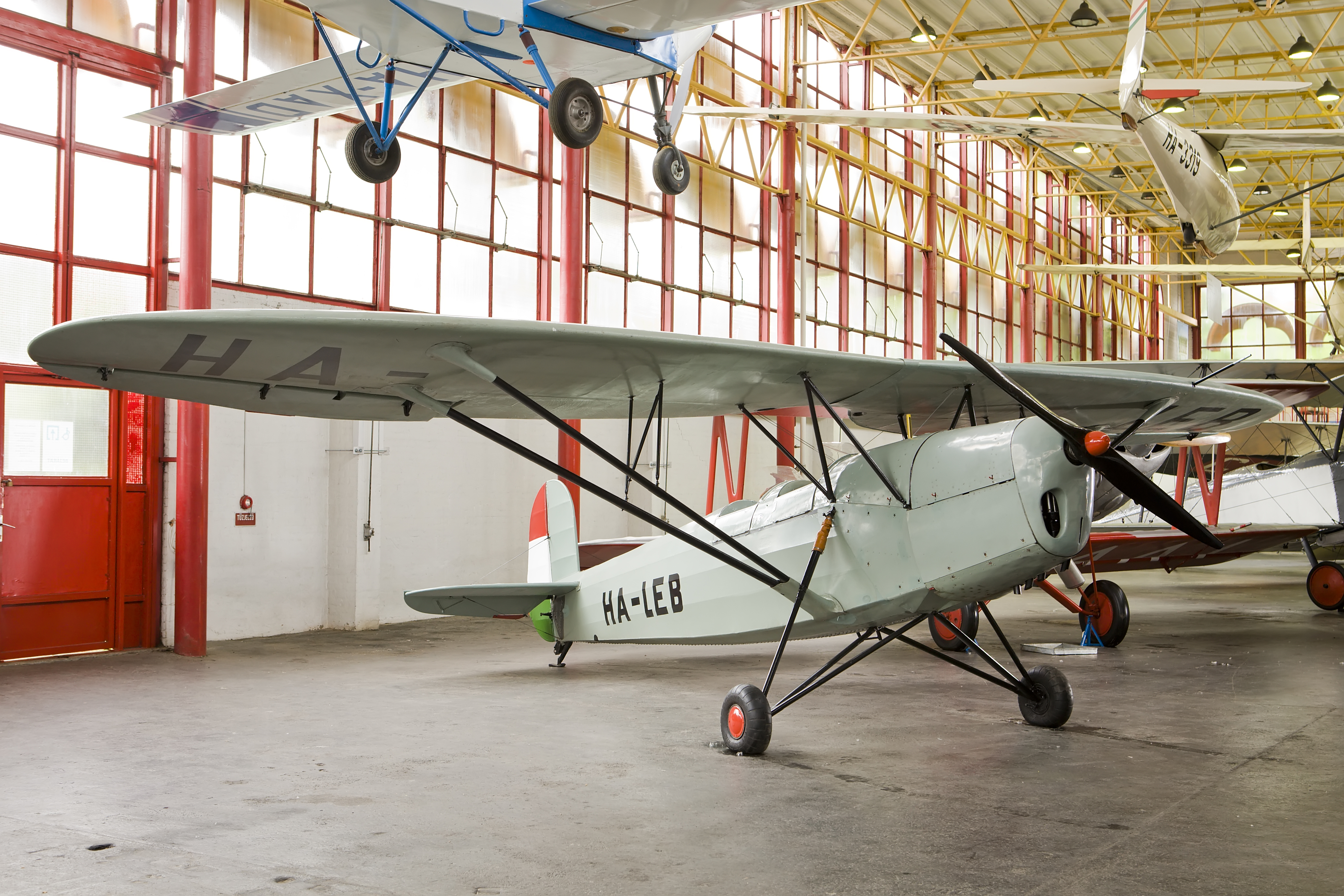
- Levente II at the Közlekedési Múzeum

General information
- Type: trainer and liaison aircraft
- Manufacturer: Repülőgépgyár Rt.
- Designer: András Fábián
- Status: retired
- Primary user: Hungarian Air Force
- Number built: 1 Levente prototype 1 Levente II prototype 86 Levente II

History
- Manufactured: 1942-1944.X. (2018-2019)
- Introduction date: 1943 (II)
- First flight: October 1940
- Retired: late 1959

The Repülőgépgyár Levente series is a Hungarian two-seat trainer and liaison aircraft from World War II. Thanks to the simple, easy-to-repair design, despite the seemingly rudimentary appearance, the type was well suited to army co-operation and liaison tasks, and Levente IIs withstood damage well, thus they could survive the fire of contemporary aircraft such as the Lavochkin La-5 and Ilyushin Il-2.

== Design and development ==
Two prototypes, designed by András Fábián, (Fábián András) were built in Magyar Waggon - és Gépgyár Rt. (Hungarian Wagon and Machine Factory; one of the few big corporations of the time) in Győr. However, a tender was placed by the air forces with the profile change of the MWG, and production rights were eventually granted to the Uhry brothers' factory (originally a small private vehicle body manufacturer, which later expanded rapidly and become a very successful competitor to elder corporations). The parasol-wing, open-cockpit tandem two-seat primary trainer Levente I prototype flew in October 1940. A second airframe was built in order to improve the flying characteristics at low altitudes. A slightly modified military version of the aircraft was named the Levente II.

The aircraft's wing has an elliptical planform, the pine wood structure was covered with canvas significantly saving on materials important in the war. The body was made of cheap CrMo steel pipes with some wire reinforcements and almost 3/4 of the surface is covered with canvas, reinforced with wooden elements in the most critical places. This design has also been helpful in fixing minor damage that usually occurs during training flights.

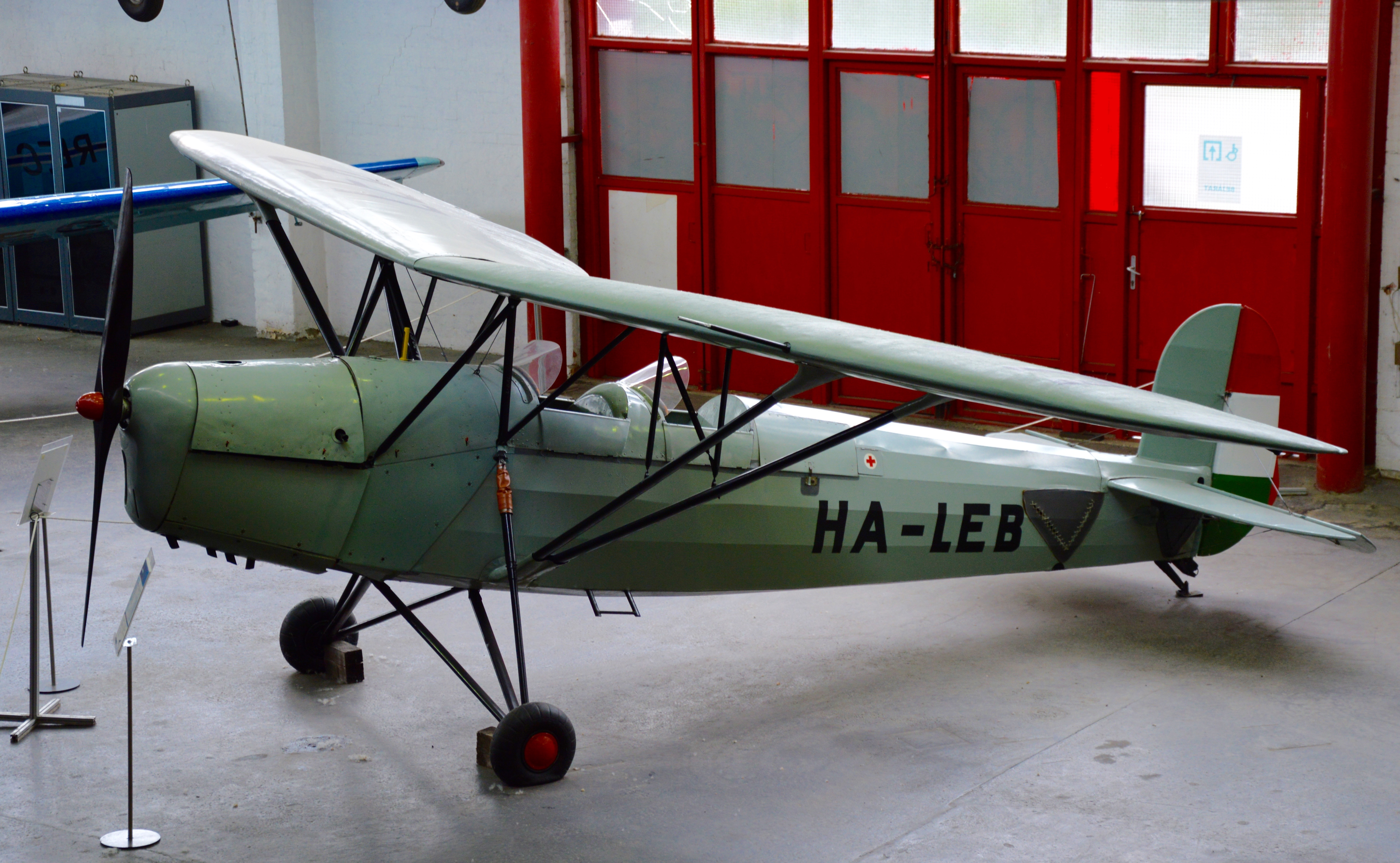
Levente II at the Közlekedési Múzeum

In 1942, the Uhri Testvérek Autókarosszéria - és Járműgyár Kft. (Uhry Brothers Car-body and Vehicle factory Ltd.) launched a new company, Repülőgépgyár Rt. (roughly meaning Aeroplane factory jsc.) at Csepel island off the Danube, south of Budapest; renting the airfield and factory halls from Weiss Manféd Rt. The Levente II was being series produced, but the plant also repaired Bü 131s, Bü 181s and built other Hungarian prototype aircraft. This idea was confirmed by the experience of war. Due to the Strategic bombing and the lack of parts production was slow, and only 86 planes were completed out of a batch of 140 ordered.

== Operational history ==
The Levente II was supplied to the Hungarian Air Force between 1941 and late 1944. 86 Levente IIs were built as trainers, but as it was war, they also served in the communications/liaison roles until the end of the war. The Levente was appropriate for both purposes, although the open cockpit design was a disadvantage in the winter fighting of 1944/45.

Although not designed for aerial combat, Leventes were fairly resistant to damage. Lieutenant Pintér and Szőcs's Levente II were attacked by IL-2s in the spring of 1945 near Kenyéri. Despite the serious damage, the aircraft remained operational. The well-maneuvering and quite small, hardly noticeable Leventes were able to perform reconnaissance and liaison missions for Me 210Ca fast bombers ("gyorsbombázó" contemporary Hungarian term for close air support and attack aircraft) from late 1944 to the end of war. Each of the flying squadrons of RHAF received at least one Levente II for courrier duty and training, while some aircraft served alongside divisions as an army co-operation unit.

After 1945 five Levente IIs were rebuilt (registration marks from HA-LEA to HA-LEF) from damaged airplanes, but the type was redesignated to the name Strucc (ostrich), because of the political connotations of the former name (see Levente (disambiguation)). They were used in civil aerial sport organizations for pilot training and for towing gliders because of their great climbing ability and economical operation. After 1956, due to a lack of spare parts they were gradually worn out and dismantled except for a museum specimen (HA-LEB).

== New production ==
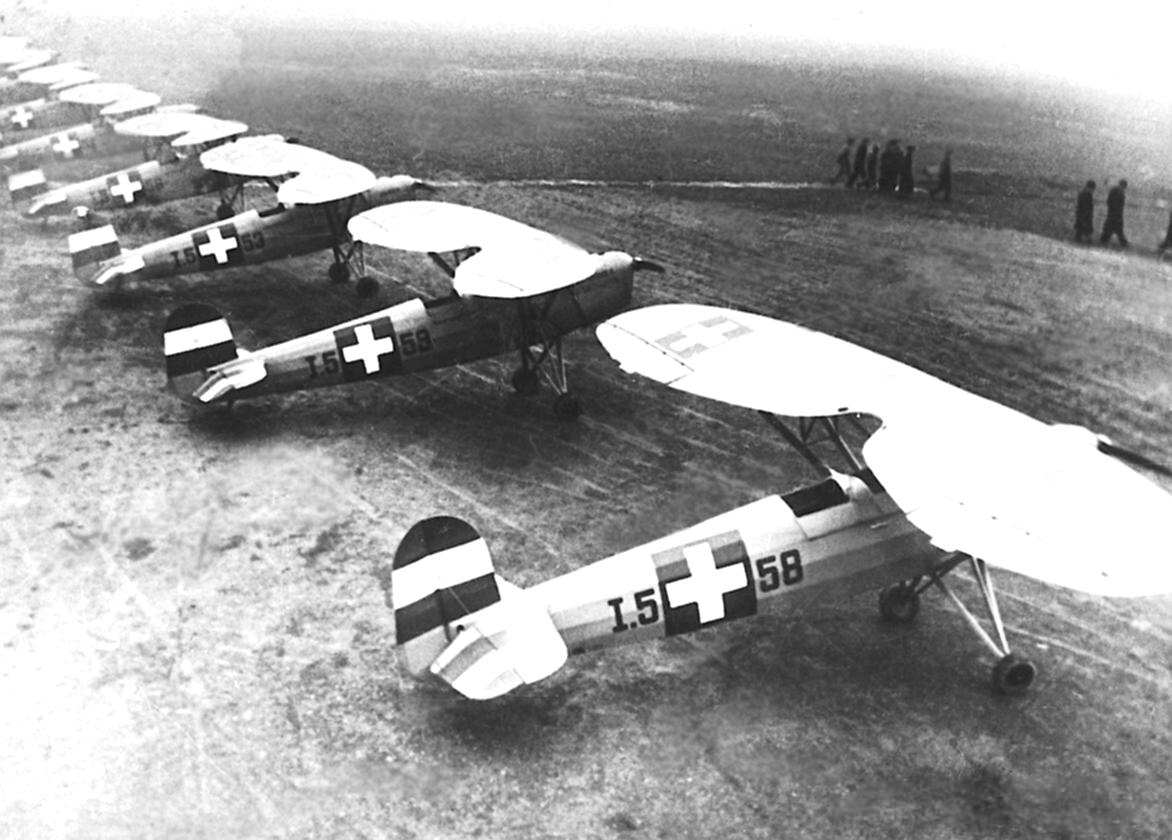
New Levente IIs at their acceptance, 1943

From late 2017 a new Levente II is under construction. The aircraft being built is identical to the 1944 Levente II series, it preserves the wood and canvas structural elements. The project runs on private support and unpaid volunteer work of university students aircraft engineers and technicians. The plane bases on the remaining blueprints and the project partly uses contemporary parts (original Hirth HM 504A–2 engine, instruments, and so on) and retains the original HA-LEB registration mark. The test flight program was successfully completed at the end of 2019 and the excellent flight performance of the aircraft was demonstrated during these flights.

== Operators ==
Hungary

- Hungarian Air Force
- Civilian Aerosport Clubs

== Specifications (Levente II) ==
3-view of Levente II

Data from The Concise Guide to Axis Aircraft of World War II

General characteristics

- Crew: 2
- Length: 6.08 m (19 ft 11 in)
- Wingspan: 9.45 m (31 ft 0 in)
- Height: 2.53 m (8 ft 4 in)
- Wing area: 13.5 m^{2} (145 sq ft)
- Empty weight: 460 kg (1,014 lb)
- Max takeoff weight: 735 kg (1,620 lb)
- Fuel capacity: 90
- Powerplant: 1 × Hirth HM 504A-2 4-cylinder inverted air-cooled in-line piston engine, 78 kW (105 hp)
- Propellers: 2-bladed fixed-pitch propeller

Performance

- Maximum speed: 180 km/h (110 mph, 97 kn)
- Cruise speed: 150 km/h (93 mph, 81 kn)
- Stall speed: 75 km/h (47 mph, 40 kn)
- Never exceed speed: 384 km/h (239 mph, 207 kn) during high angle dive
- Range: 650 km (400 mi, 350 nmi)
- Ferry range: 650 km (400 mi, 350 nmi)
- Service ceiling: 4,500 m (14,800 ft)
- Time to altitude: 3.16 min to 1000 m
- Wing loading: 54.8 kg/m^{2} (11.2 lb/sq ft) at maximum weight

== See also ==
Aircraft of comparable role, configuration, and era

- Bü 131
- Tiger Moth
- Po-2
