= Istanbul Aquarium =

Coordinates: 40°57′51″N 28°48′00″E

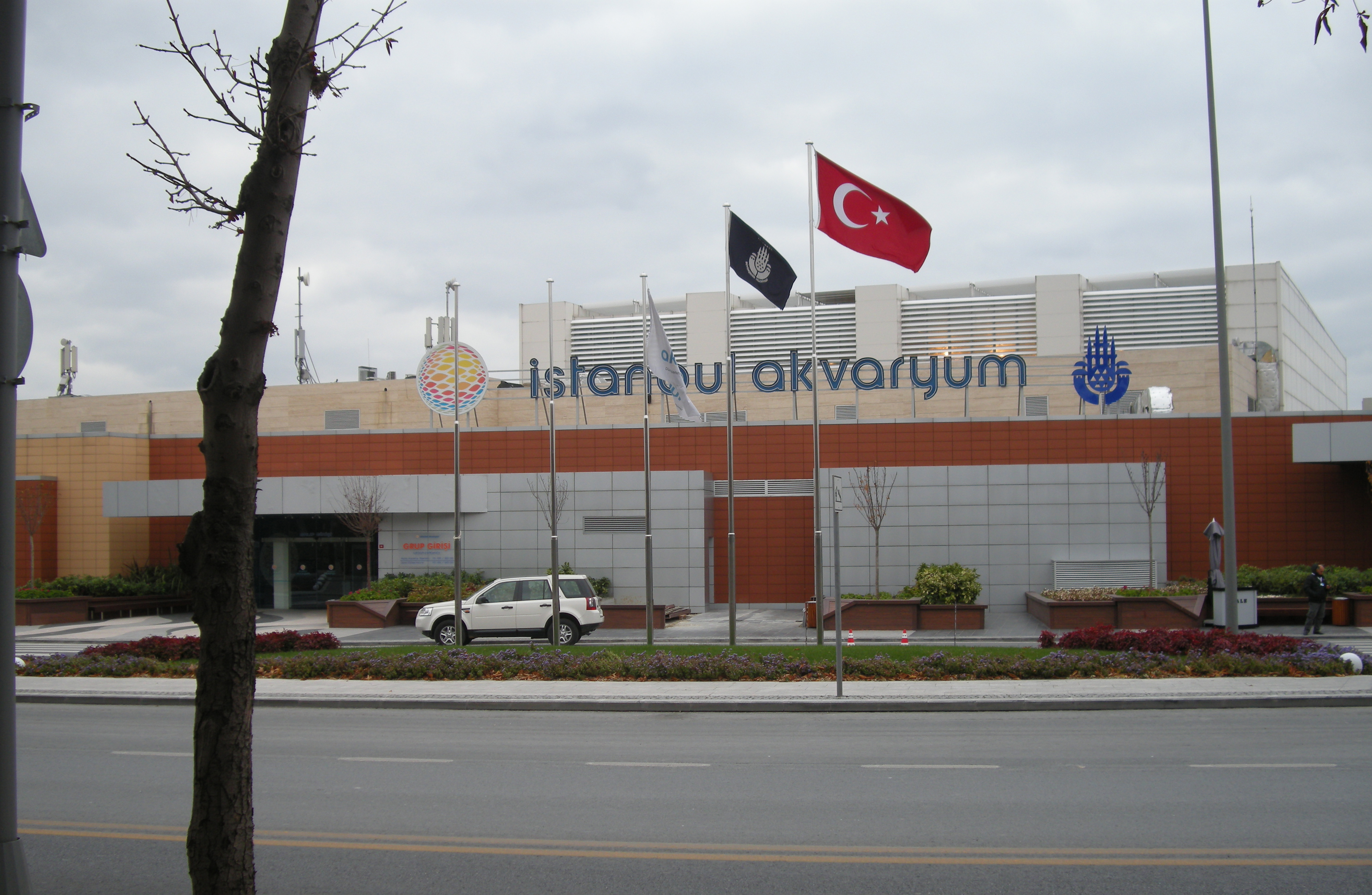
- Interactive map of Istanbul Aquarium
- Date opened: April 1, 2011
- Location: Bakırköy, Istanbul, Turkey
- Total volume of tanks: 7,000 cubic metres (1,800,000 US gal)
- Memberships: WAZA
- Website: www.istanbulakvaryum.com

Istanbul Aquarium (Istanbul Akvaryum) is a public aquarium in Istanbul, Turkey. It opened its doors in April 2011 and is an official member of World Association of Zoos and Aquariums (WAZA). The site is 5km from Atatürk International Airport, near the motorway and railway transportation systems in Florya, which is at the southwest coast of Istanbul.

Istanbul Aquarium holds a leading position among worldwide aquariums thanks to its volume, variety of fish species, and the activities on travel routes. Visitors follow a geographical route that includes 16 themes and 1 rainforest going from the Black Sea towards the Pacific. The aquarium was designed by public aquarium design consultants OCEAN Projects.

The aquarists at Istanbul Aquarium work to feed, clean and check the medical and physical conditions of the creatures according to the quarantine protocol set by the aquarium management. To allow all living creatures in the Aquarium continue to live in the conditions as nearest as possible to those of their habitat.

== Istanbul Aquarium in figures ==
- Water volume: 7000 cubic meters; 66 tanks in total,
- A two-storey giant project with total area of 22.000 square meters on 100-decare land,
- Parking lot area of 32.000 square meters/1.200 vehicles belonging to Istanbul Aquarium,
- Visitor area of 6.000 square meters, A special-themed,
- 1,2 km long travel route originating in the Black Sea towards the Pacific,
- Approximately 1.500 species, 15.000 land and sea creatures in total, which are interesting from each other,
- 2, 15-person, 6-axle 5D movie houses, providing the option to watch 7 separate films, an extraordinary system that makes live some effects such as wind, fog and water.
- A gift shop with an area of 470 square meters within Istanbul Aquarium,
- 3 cafeterias on the travel route,
- 1 restaurant having the Panama Canal view on one side and the sea view on the other.

== Gallery ==
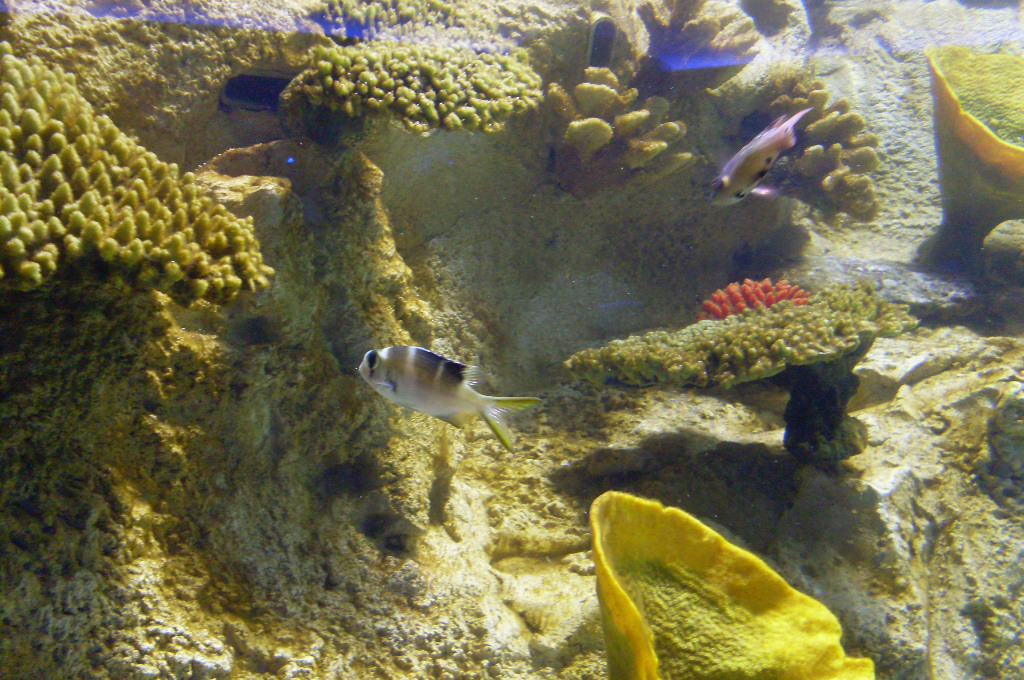

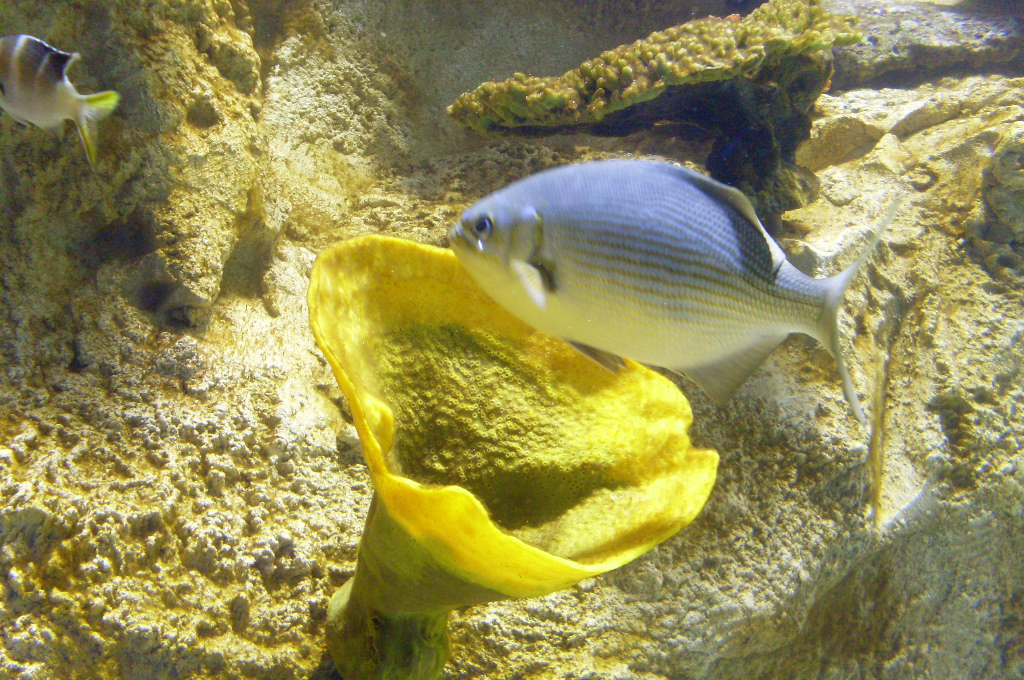

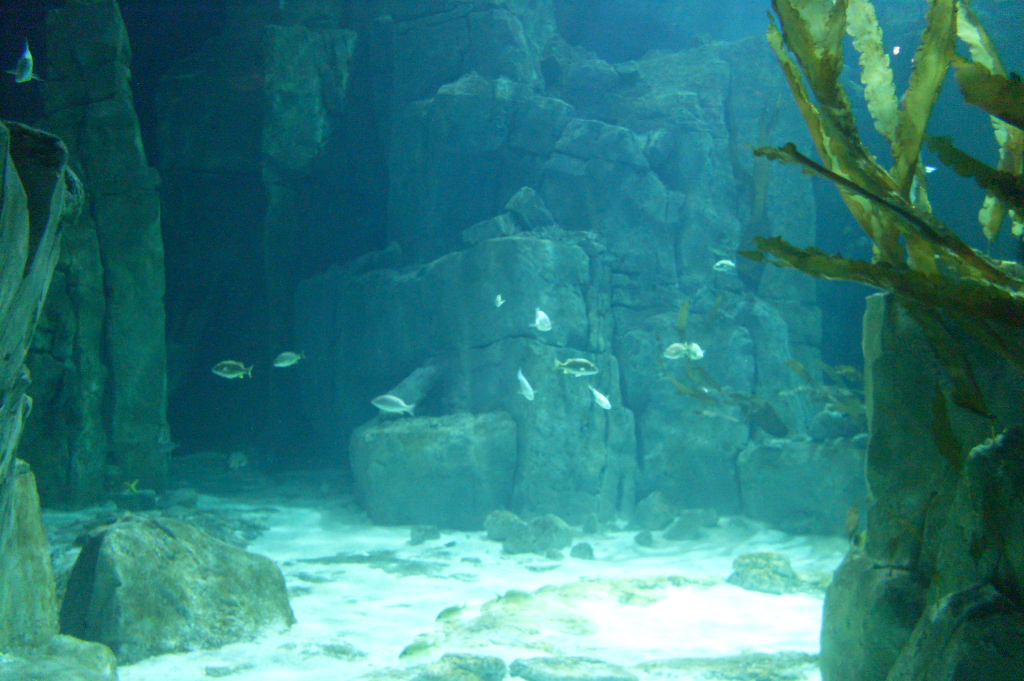

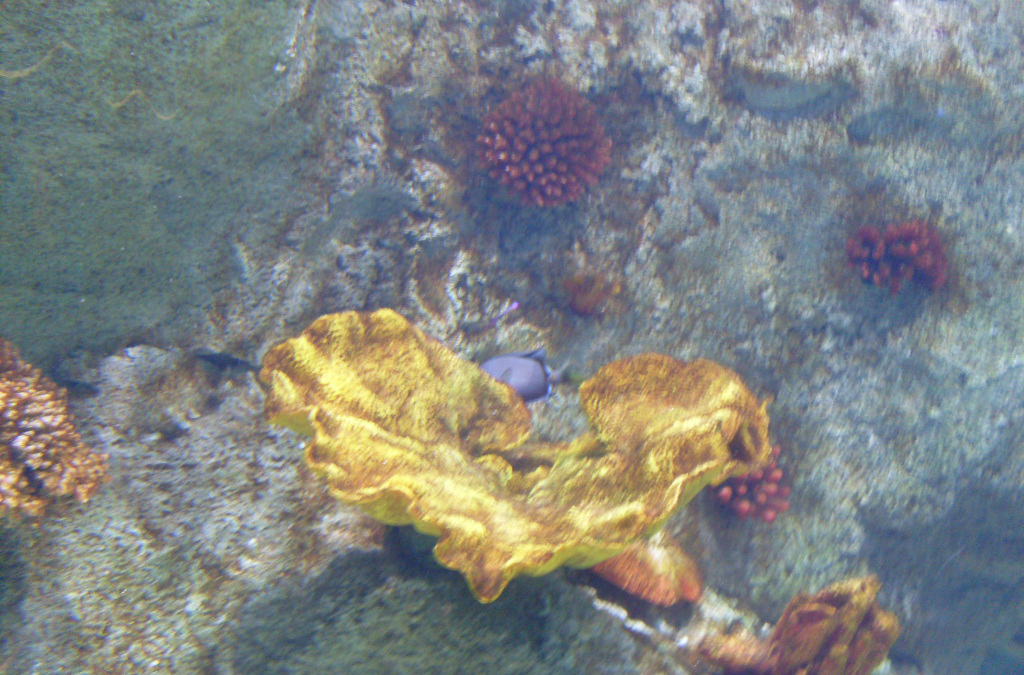

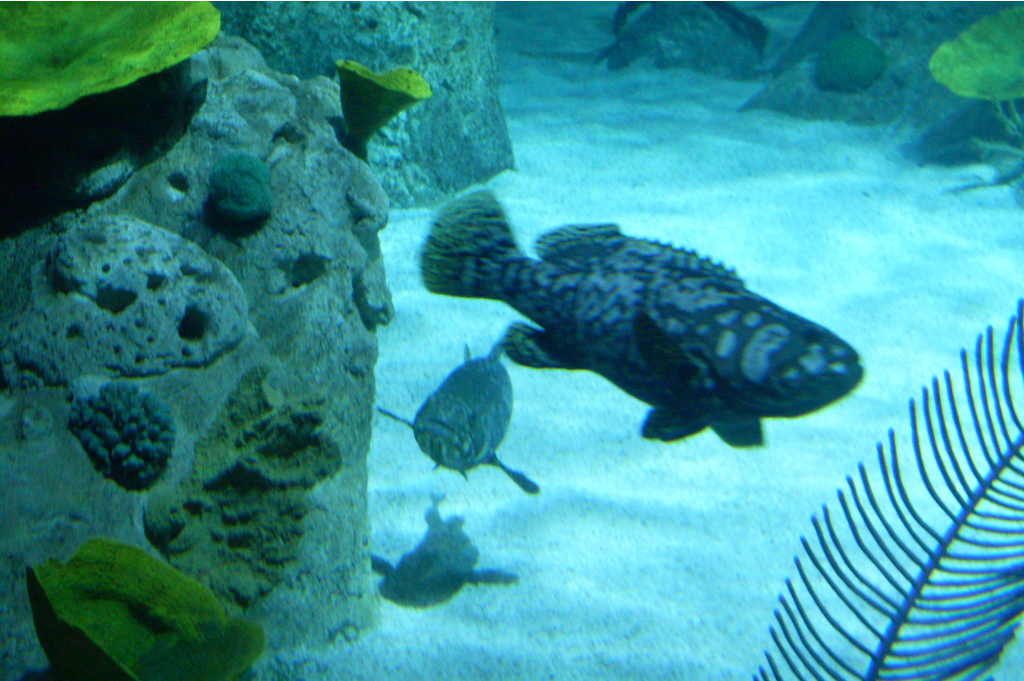

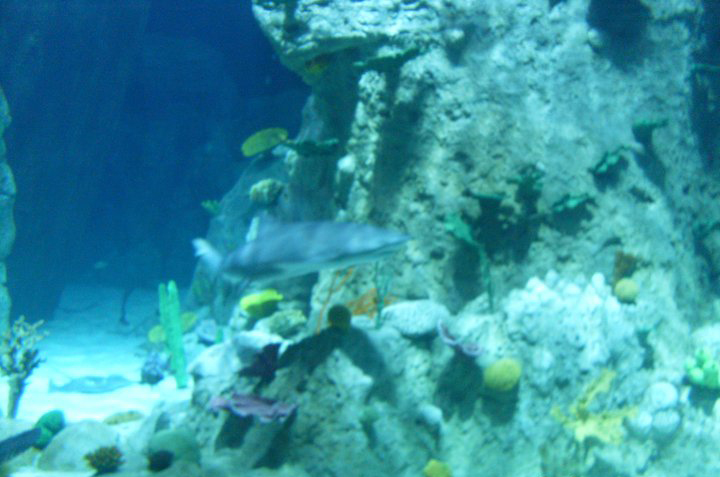

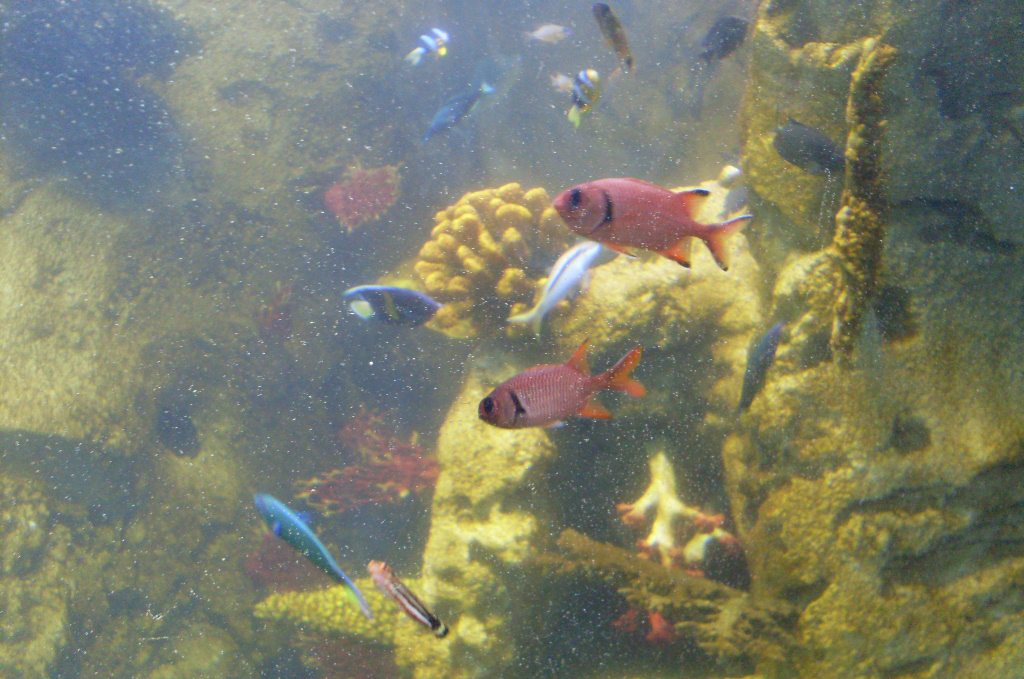

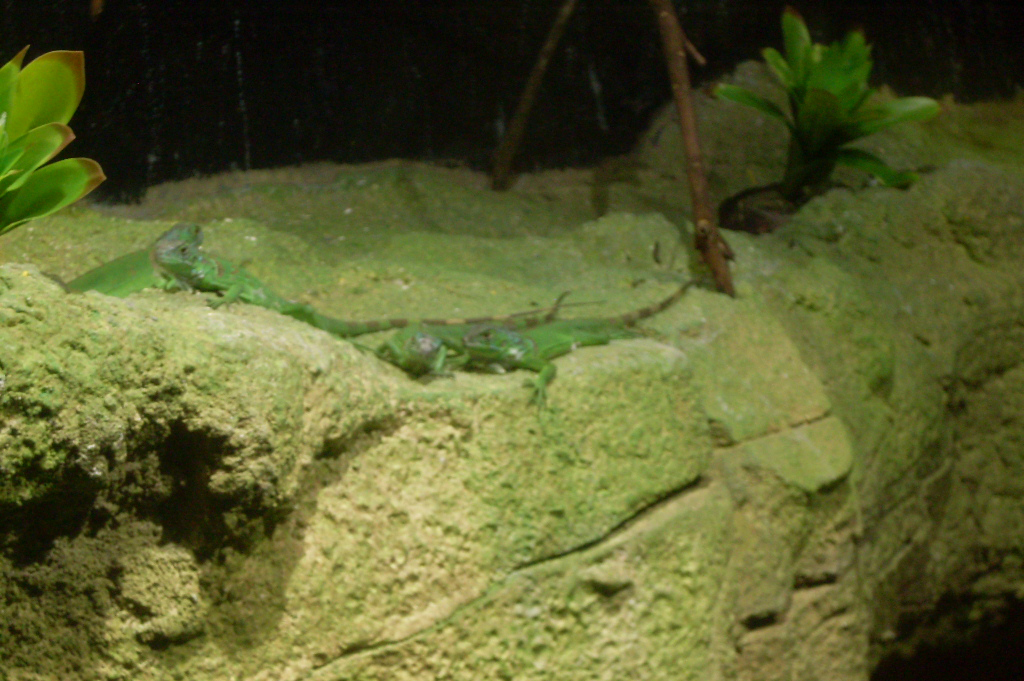

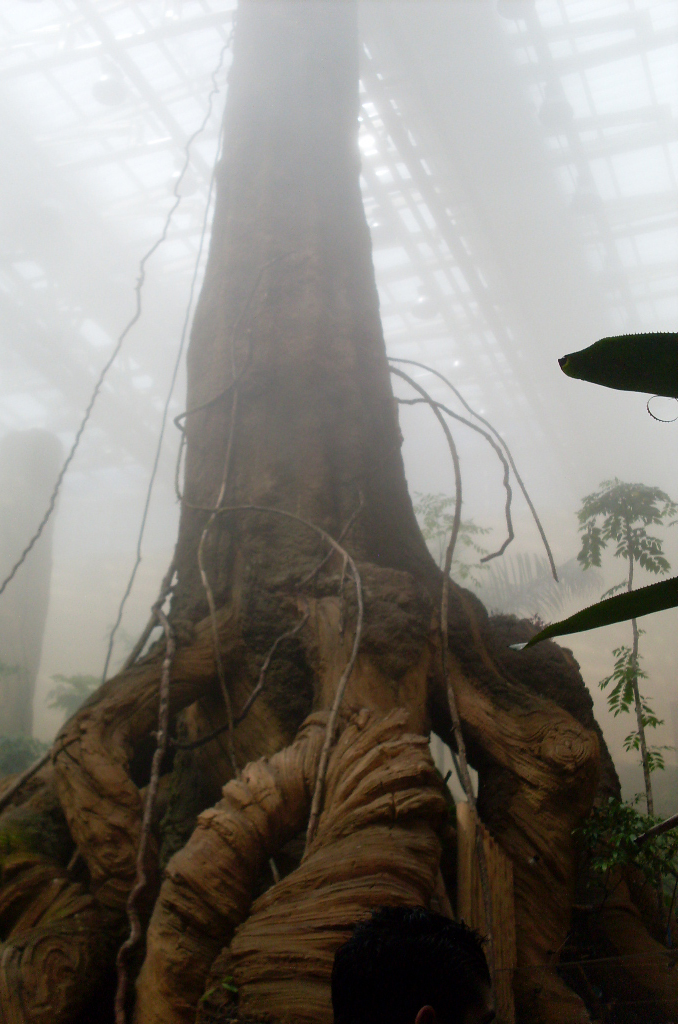

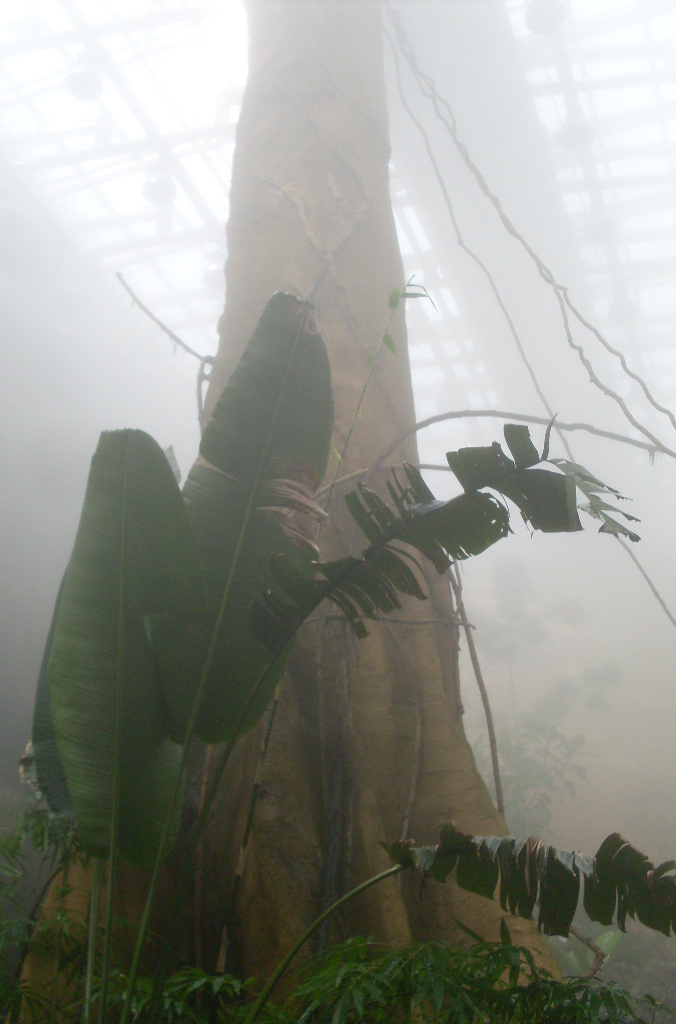

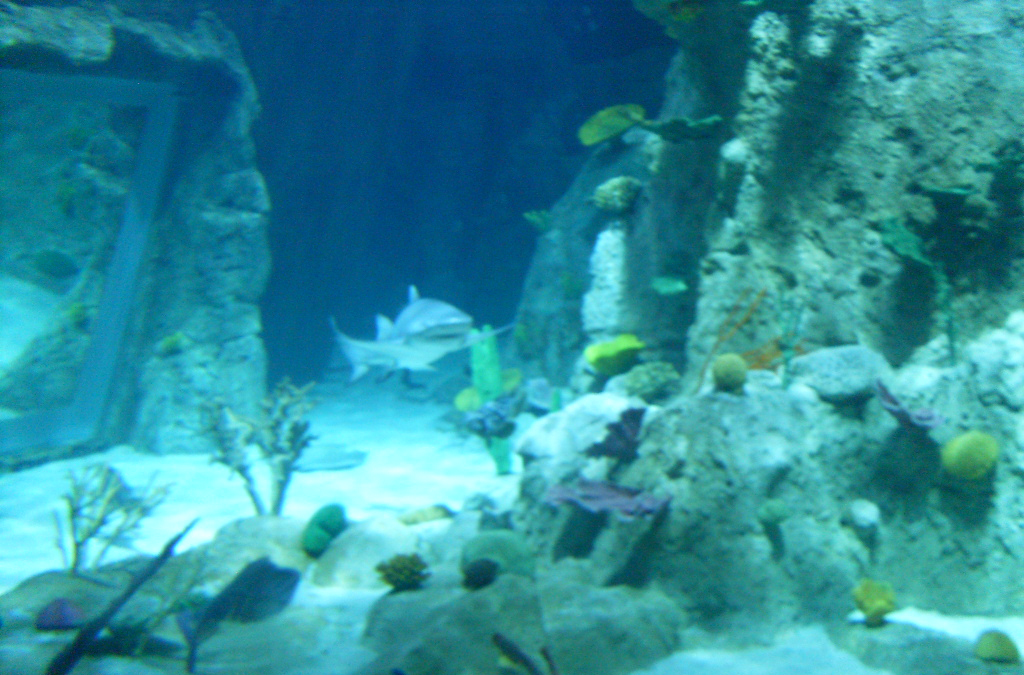

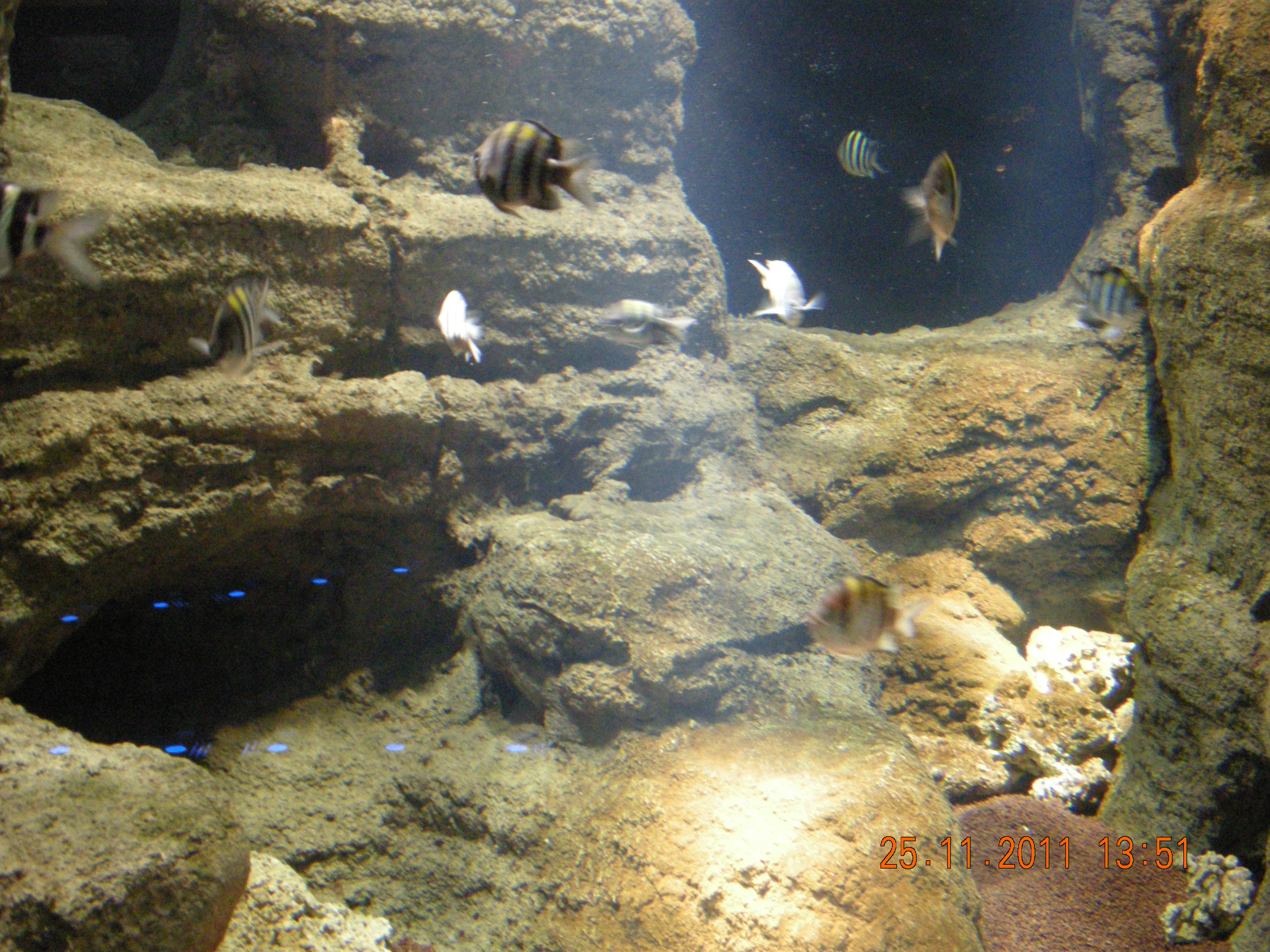

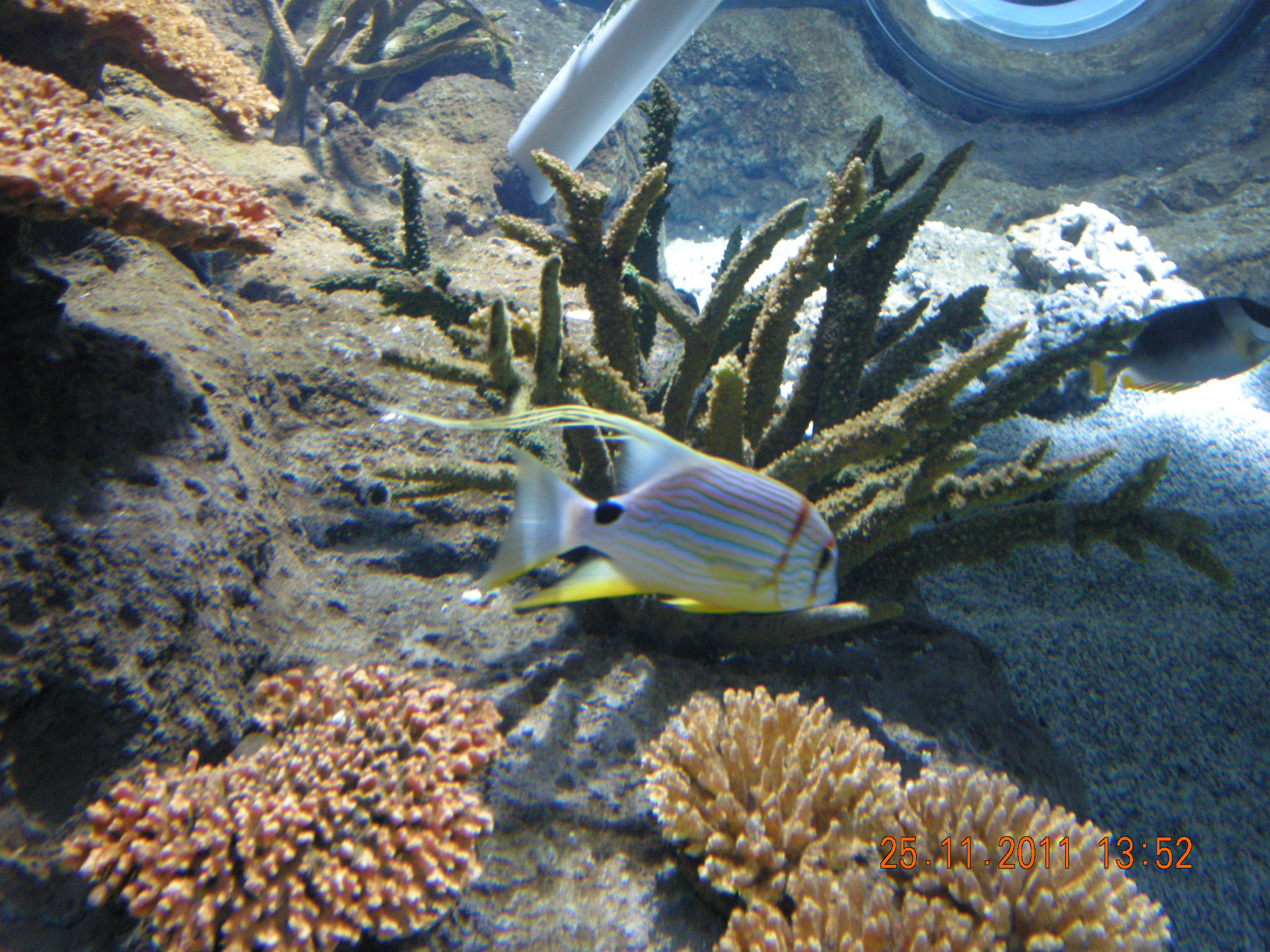

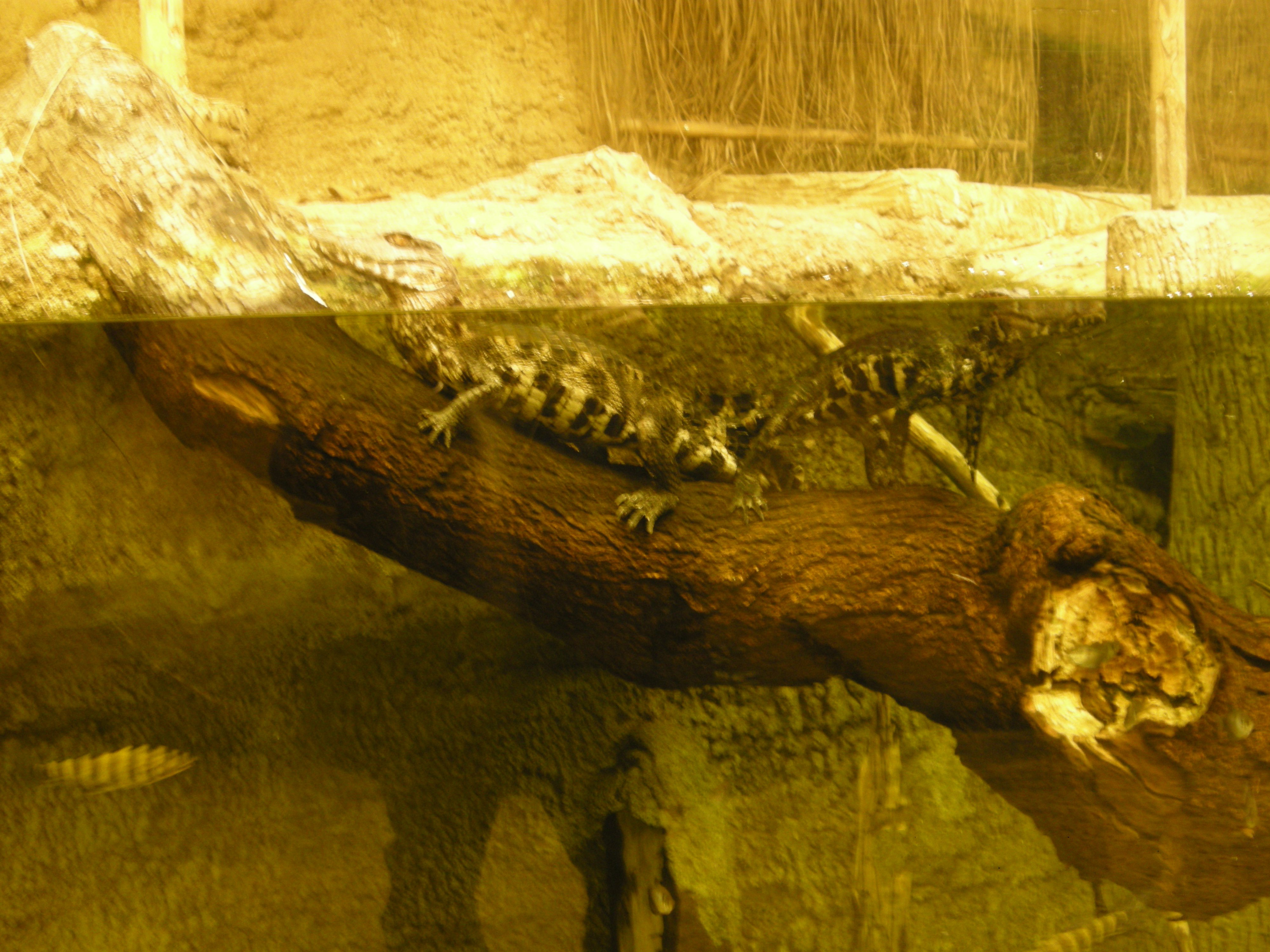

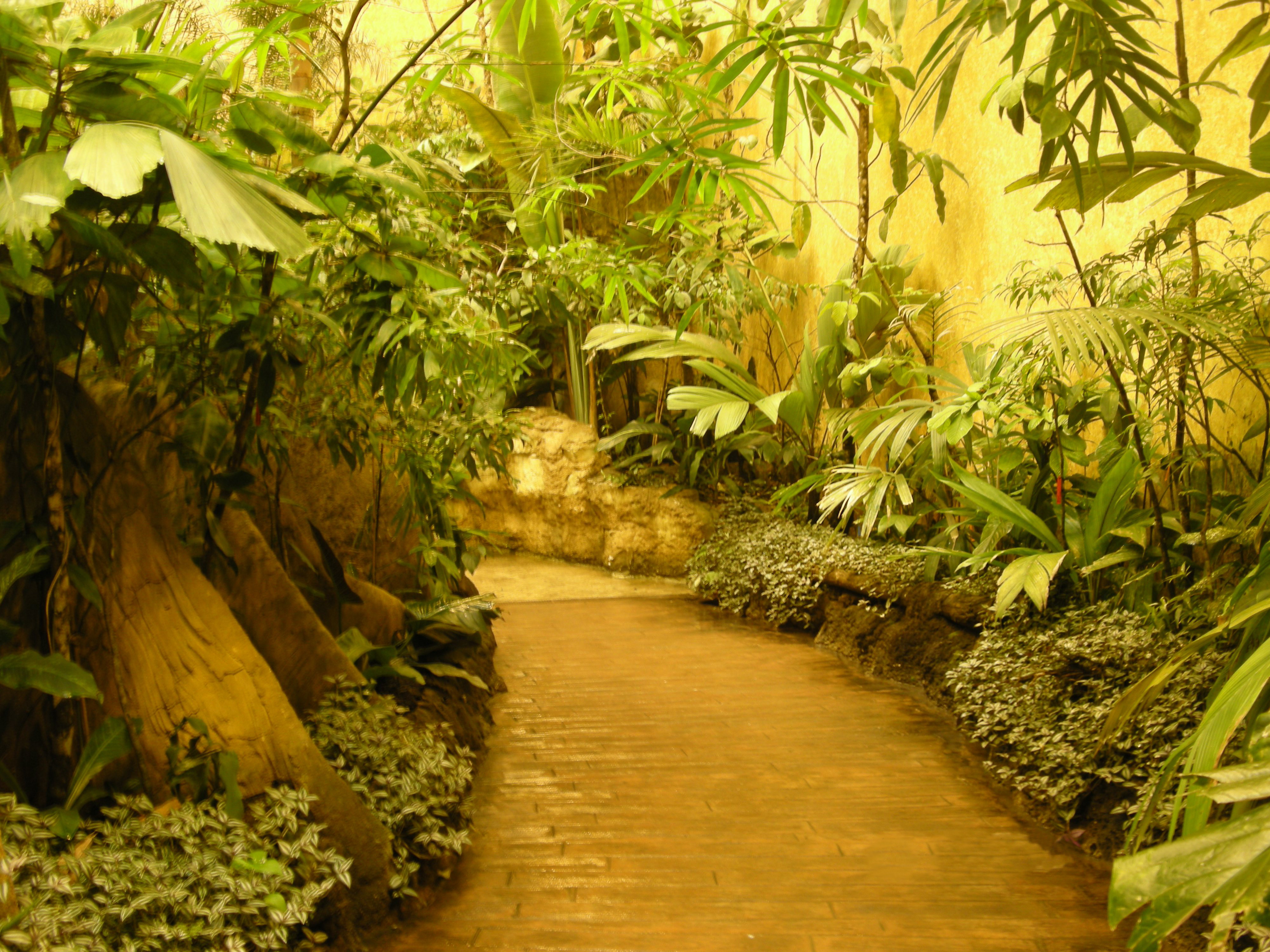

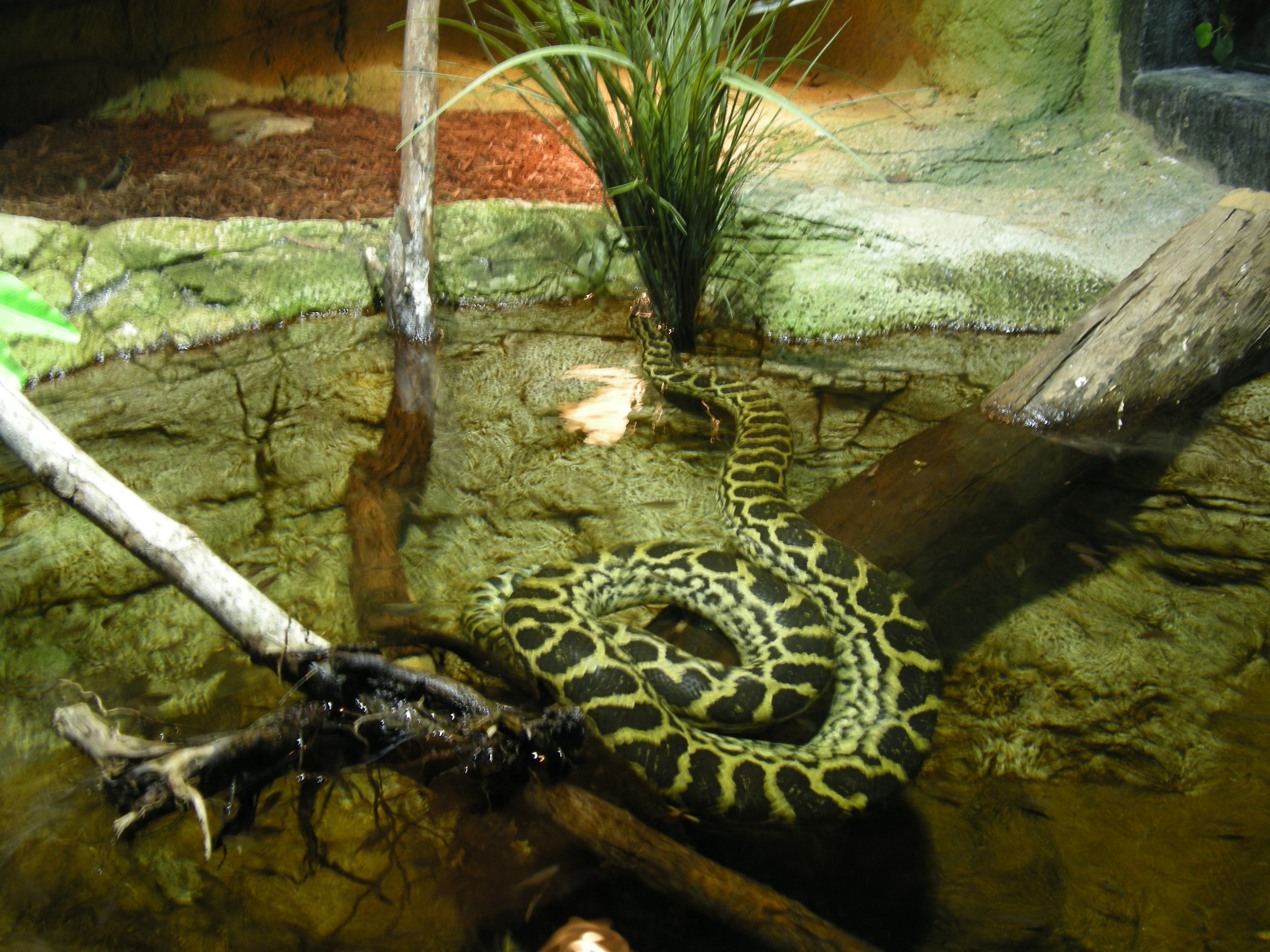

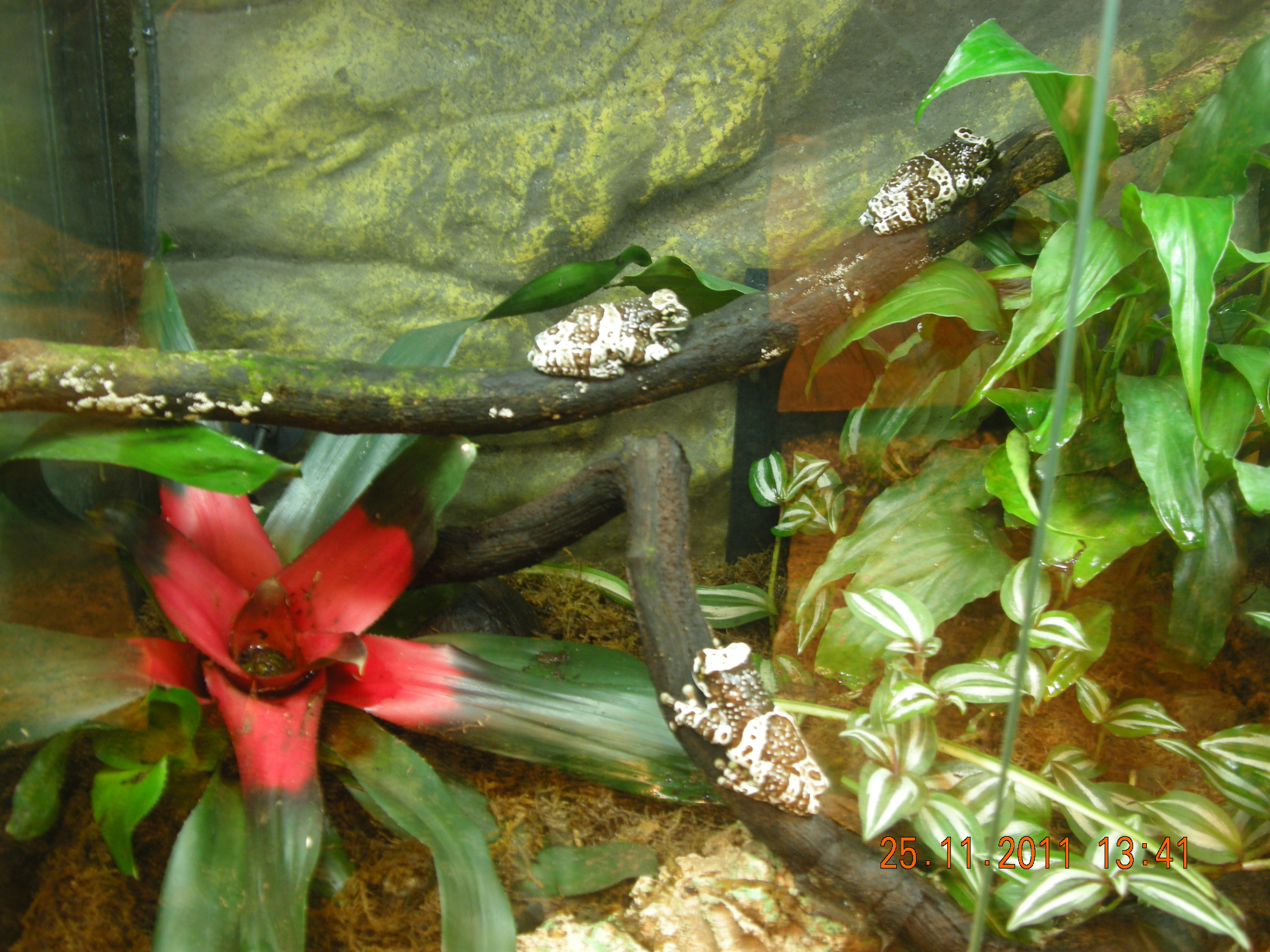

== See also ==
- BOSPHORUS
- Istanbul Tower 205
