= Levent (name) =

Levent is a masculine given name and surname of Turkish origin. It is derived from the word Levend. Notable people with the name include:

== Given name ==
- Levent Açıkgöz (born 1971), Turkish football player and manager
- Levent Alpöge (born 1992), Turkish-American mathematician
- Levent Ateş (born 1991), Turkish middle-distance runner
- Levent Ayçiçek (born 1994), German-Turkish footballer
- Levent Çoker (born 1958), Turkish musician
- Levent Devrim (born 1969), Turkish football manager
- Levent Erdoğan (1958–2025), Turkish weightlifter
- Levent Eriş (born 1962), Turkish football manager and player
- Levent Ersöz (born 1954), Turkish general
- Levent Gök (born 1959), Turkish politician
- Levent Gülen (born 1994), Turkish-Swiss footballer
- Levent Gürel (born 1964), Turkish scientist and electrical engineer
- Levent Kartop (born 1979), Turkish footballer
- Levent Kazak (born 1967), Turkish screenwriter and actor
- Levent Kenez (born 1978), Turkish journalist and writer
- Levent Kırca (1948–2015), Turkish comedian, actor, columnist, and politician
- Levent Mercan (born 2000), Turkish footballer
- Levent Osman (born 1977), Australian footballer
- Levent Şahin (born 1973), Turkish football manager and player
- Levent Sahinkaya (born 1959), Turkish diplomat
- Levent Topsakal (born 1966), Turkish basketball player
- Levent Tuncat (born 1988), German-Turkish taekwondo practitioner
- Levent Ülgen (born 1962), Turkish actor
- Levent Uysal (born 1969), Turkish businessman, entrepreneur, and politician
- Levent Üzümcü (born 1972), Turkish actor
- Levent Yılmaz (born 1990), Turkish footballer
- Levent Yüksel (born 1964), Turkish singer

== Surname ==
- Haluk Levent (born 1968), Turkish musician

== See also ==
Levente, a Hungarian name
