= Istanbul Tower 205 =

Skyscraper in Istanbul

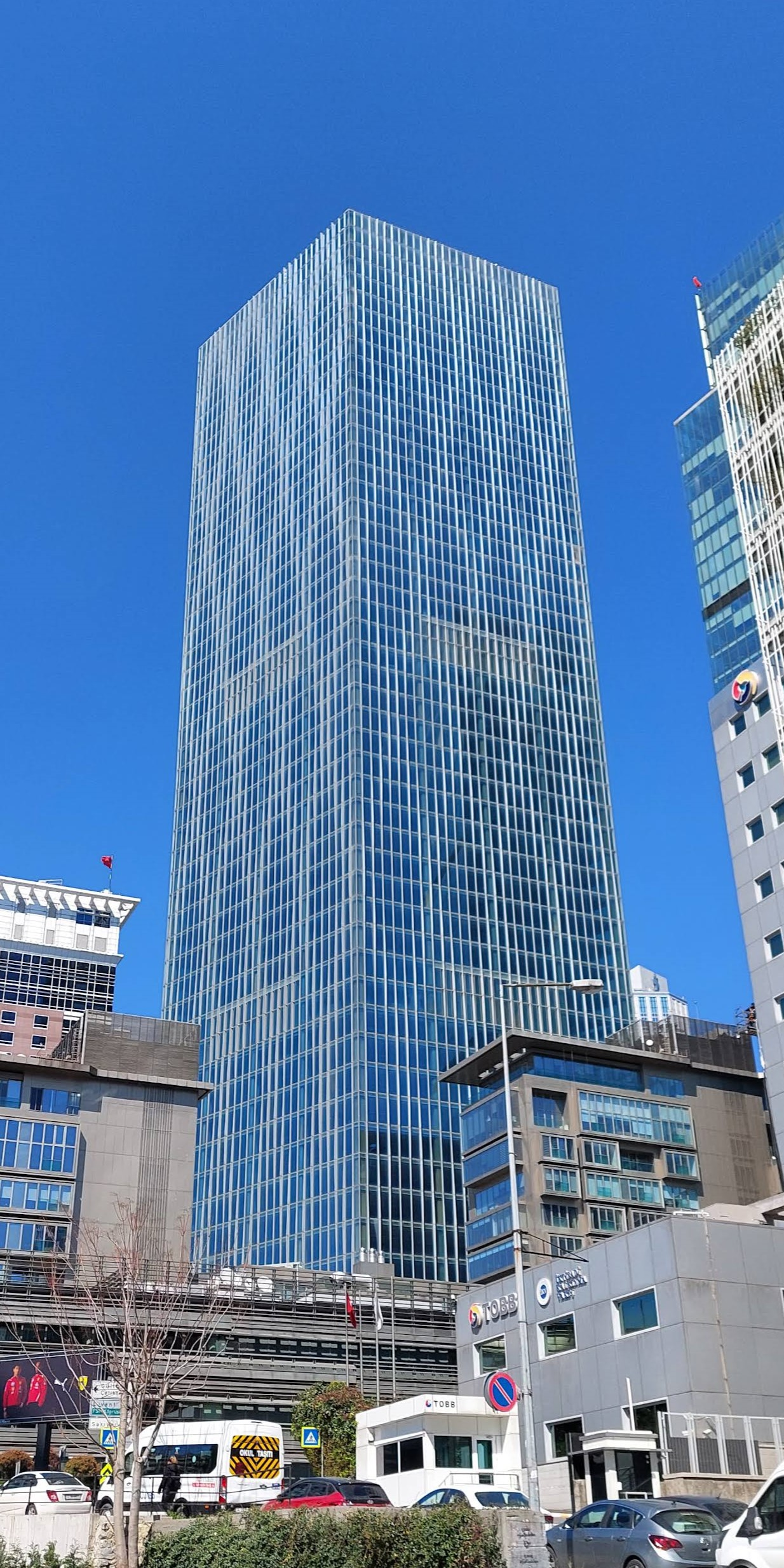
- A view of the tower from Oto Avenue.
- Interactive map of the Istanbul Tower 205 area

General information
- Status: Completed
- Type: Office
- Location: Büyükdere Avenue, Levent, Istanbul, Turkey
- Coordinates: 41°05′06″N 29°00′21″E
- Opening: 2019

Height
- Roof: 225 m (738 ft)

Technical details
- Floor count: 52 (above ground); 9 (below ground); 61 (total)
- Floor area: 246,000 m^{2} (2,650,000 sq ft)

Design and construction
- Architect: Skidmore, Owings & Merrill
- Developer: Zincir Yapi Konut

Other information
- Public transit access: 4. Levent

Website
- yesilholding.com/zincir-yapi

Istanbul Tower 205 is an office skyscraper located in the central business district of Levent in Istanbul, Turkey.

It is Istanbul's and Turkey's 6th tallest skyscraper, and the 37th tallest building in Europe when completed in 2019. Tower 205 rises 52 floors above ground level, and has an above-ground roof height of 220 meters from the main entrance and 225 meters from the rear entrance. Designed by Skidmore, Owings & Merrill

As of 2023, Istanbul Tower 205 is the 7th tallest skyscraper in Istanbul and Turkey, behind the 284-meter-tall twin towers of Skyland İstanbul located adjacent to Türk Telekom Stadium in the Seyrantepe quarter of the Sarıyer district, on the European side, and the 280-meter-tall Metropol Istanbul Tower in the Ataşehir district on the Asian side of the city.

== History and architecture ==
At 220 meters tall, Istanbul Tower 205 is Turkey's tallest office building. The 246,000 square meter structure consists of a 52-story office tower atop a podium and 9 floors of underground parking on a 21,000 square meter plot of land. The tower is located on Büyükdere Avenue, one of Istanbul's central financial quarters. The project complies with LEED Platinum quality standard and was constructed in an entirely environment friendly manner.

== Construction work ==
The tower was first proposed in 2012 with a different design. Design was revised and streamlined in 2014. It was originally known as Faco Tower but later adopted the name of Istanbul Tower 205. Construction of the project began in 2016 and was completed in 2019.

=== Companies ===
The companies involved in the development and construction of the project have included thus far:

- Metal Yapi Konut (investor and developer)
- Yeşil GYO (investor and developer)
- Zincir Yapı (General Contractor)
- Demsar İnşaat (project's sub-contractor for the structural construction of the skyscraper)
- Skidmore, Owings & Merrill (the project's architectural design firm)

== See also ==
- List of tallest buildings in Istanbul
- List of tallest buildings in Turkey
- List of tallest buildings in Europe
