= Levend =

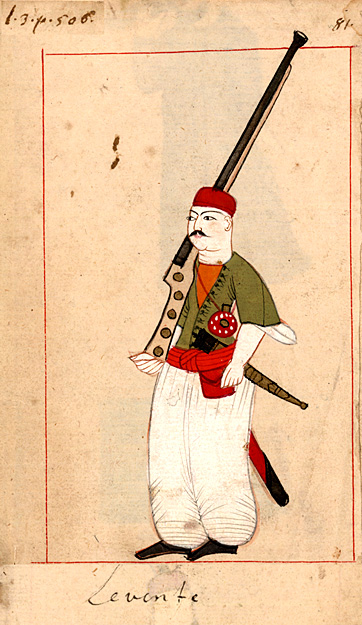
Depiction of a levend from the mid-17th century

Levend or levendi was a name for irregular soldiers. The term originated with the Ottoman Navy, but eventually spread to encompass most irregular troops.

The origin of the term is probably from Italian levanti, and was used by the Venetians for the various local troops they raised in the coasts of the Balkans, i.e. Christian Greeks, Albanians, and Dalmatians, to serve in the Venetian navy or as auxiliary troops. The Ottomans, who relied on the same manpower pool (eventually along with Muslim Anatolian Turks), borrowed the name. Gradually, as the Ottoman navy became more professional, the undisciplined levends started to be replaced by regular troops. The name however survived as a generic name for naval troops, particularly the riflemen (tüfekdji). Thus the Imperial Arsenal in Constantinople contained two barracks for levends.

Thus in the 17th and 18th centuries, levend came to refer to irregular mercenaries, mostly infantry but also cavalry, used alongside other terms. Like the mercenaries and condottieri of Western Europe, the levend formed true "free companies"; their employer was either the Ottoman central government, which was increasingly pressed for fresh troops to match the growing strength of its various neighbours, and to offset the decline of its once-formidable kapikulu soldiery, or various provincial magnates and governors. A notable aspect of Ottoman mercenaries is that they served away from their home region; thus Albanians served in the Middle East, and Anatolian Turks in Europe or North Africa.

When without employment, however, the levends often turned to brigandage, and the term quickly came to denote any "vagabond and rascal". At the turn of the 18th century, the Ottoman authorities tried to counter the activities of roving levend bands by offering them employment in the new military corps of deli and gönüllü. Later, repeated expeditions were waged against them in Anatolia in 1737, 1747, 1752, 1759, and 1763. Even when they formed part of a governor's retinue, however, they had a reputation for criminal behaviour and licentiousness, as records from the Ottoman provinces and the tales of Western travellers show.

== Sources ==
- Kramers, J. H. (1986). "Lewend". In Bosworth, C. E.; van Donzel, E.; Lewis, B. & Pellat, Ch. (eds.). The Encyclopaedia of Islam, Second Edition. Volume V: Khe–Mahi. Leiden: E. J. Brill. pp. 23–24. ISBN 978-90-04-07819-2.
- Semerdjian, Elyse (2008). "Off the Straight Path": Illicit Sex, Law, and Community in Ottoman Aleppo. Syracuse University Press. ISBN 978-0815631736.
- Uyar, Mesut; Erickson, Edward J. (2009). A Military History of the Ottomans: From Osman to Atatürk. ABC-CLIO. ISBN 978-0-275-98876-0.
