= Levantine =

Levantine may refer to:

- Anything pertaining to the Levant, the region centered around modern Syria, Lebanon, Israel, Palestine, and Jordan, including any person from the Levant
  - Syria (region), corresponding to the modern countries of the Levant
- Levantine Sea, the easternmost part of the Mediterranean
- Levantines (also Latin-Levantines, Franco-Levantines, Italian Levantines), Members of the Latin Church in the Middle East:
- Levantine Arabic, a variety of Arabic
- Levantine cuisine, the cuisine of the Levant
- Levantine Cultural Center, subsequently The Markaz, a cultural center in Los Angeles, California
- Batavia (cloth), also called "Levantine", a type of cloth originally produced in the Levant.
- Turkish Levantine, descendants of Europeans who settled in parts of the Ottoman Empire.

== See also ==
- Levantinization
