= List of tallest buildings in Istanbul =

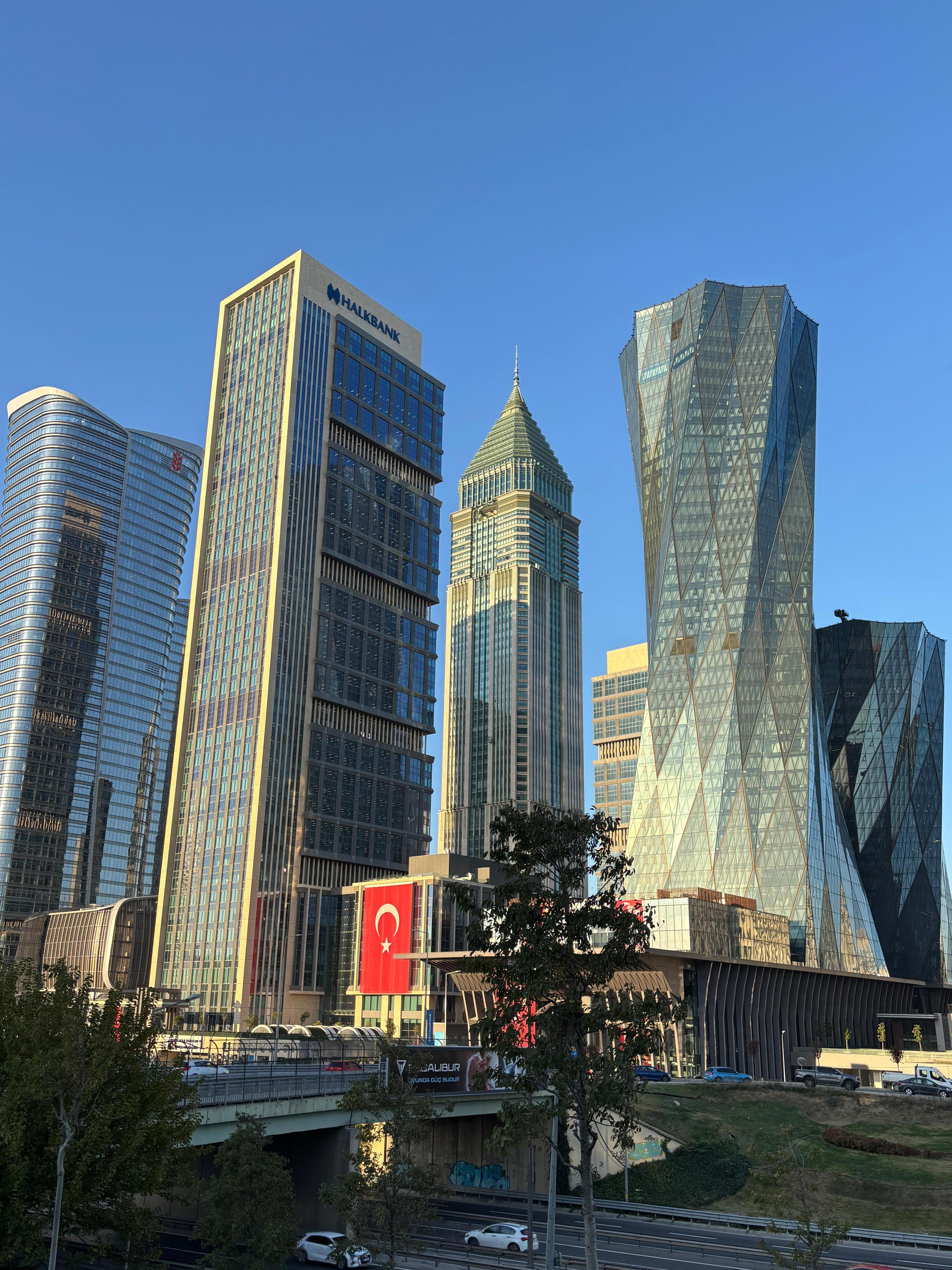
The Turkish Central Bank and other state-owned banks such as Ziraat Bank, VakıfBank and Halkbank have their new headquarters at the Istanbul Financial Center (IFC).

Istanbul is the largest city in Turkey and the country's leading economic and financial center. As of October 2025, the city is home to 77 skyscrapers (buildings at least 150 m (490 ft) tall), as well as hundreds of high-rises.

The tallest building in the city is the CBRT Tower at the Istanbul Financial Center in Ataşehir, which reaches a height of 354 m (1,161 ft).

Istanbul's first high-rise tower is considered to be the 25-floor Harbiye Orduevi, built in 1974, and standing 84 m (276 ft) tall. The 25-floor InterContinental Istanbul Hotel (originally Sheraton) was designed earlier in 1959, but its construction was delayed until 1968 and was completed in 1975. The Marmara Taksim Hotel, with 28 floors, was completed in 1976.The first buildings to reach and surpass 100 meters were the 100-meter (330 ft), 26-story Princess Hotel (later Hilton Maslak), built in 1990; the 103-meter (338 ft), 30-story Maya Akar Center, built in 1992; and the 136-meter (446 ft) and 118-meter (387 ft) Sabancı Center towers, built in 1993. The first skyscraper in Istanbul above 150 meters was the 158-meter (518 ft), 44-story Tekstilkent Koza Plaza, which was topped out in 1998 in the Esenler district. Akbank Tower remained Istanbul's tallest skyscraper (and the second-tallest of Turkey after the 176.8 m (580 ft), 52-floor Mertim Tower in Mersin) until the completion of the 181.2 m (594 ft), 52-floor Isbank Tower 1, which was constructed at a nearby land lot on Büyükdere Avenue in Levent business district between 1996 and 2000.

The city saw a major boom in skyscrapers in the 21st century, situated mostly, but not only, in Levent, Maslak and Şişli on the European side, and Ataşehir on the Asian side.

An incomplete list of the tallest buildings in Istanbul is available below:

== Skyscrapers taller than 150 m ==
Was the tallest building in Istanbul upon completion

	Name	Image	Height (meters)	Height (feet)	Floors	Year built	Notes
1	CBRT Tower		354-330	1161	62	2024	Tallest building in Istanbul and Turkey Designed by Vizzion Architects Headquarters of the CBRT
2	Metropol Tower Istanbul		301-278	987	70	2018	Designed by RMJM and Dome+Partners
3	Skyland Office Istanbul		278	912	65	2017	Tallest building in Turkey between 2017-2024 Designed by Broadway Malyan and Tallest building in European side.
4	Skyland Residence Istanbul		278	912	65	2017	Tallest building in Turkey between 2017-2024 Designed by Broadway Malyan and Tallest building in European side.
5	Istanbul Sapphire		261-236	856	54	2010	Tallest building in Turkey between 2011-2017 Designed by Tabanlıoğlu Architects
6	Emaar Square The Address Hotel & Residences		245-218	804	51	2020	Tallest hotel in Istanbul Designed by Foster + Partners
7	Istanbul Tower 205		220	724	52	2019	Designed by SOM 225 meters tall from the rear entrance and 220 meters tall from the main entrance.
8	Nurol Life		220	724	60	2018	
9	Istanbul IFC Ziraat Bank Tower 1		219	719	46	2023	Designed by KPF
10	Spine Tower		211-202	692	47	2014	Tallest building in Maslak business district. Designed by İki Design Group
11	Halk Bank Headquarters Tower 1		208	682	45	2023	
12	Sinpaş Queen Bomonti		195	640	56	2018	Tallest building in Bomonti district.
13	Akasya Kent		195	640	55	2014	
14	Anthill Residences		195	640	54	2010	
15	Anthill Residences		195	640	54	2010	
16	Vakıf Bank Headquarters Tower 1		194	636	43	2023	Designed by Aukett Swanke
17	Çiftçi Towers		194	636	45	2018	Designed by John McAslan + Partners
18	Çiftçi Towers		194	636	45	2018	Designed by John McAslan + Partners
19	Istanbul IFC Ziraat Bank Tower 2		194	636	40	2023	Designed by KPF
20	Allianz Tower		186	610	40	2014	
21	Varyap Meridian Grand Tower		184	606	57	2013	
22	İşbank Tower 1		181	594	52	2000	Tallest building in Turkey between 2000-2011 Designed by Swanke Hayden Connell Architects and Tekeli-Sisa.
23	Palladium Tower		180	591	43	2011	Designed by Aukett Swanke
24	Sarphan Finans Park		178	584	48	2015	
25	Etro Residences-Rams Beyond		178	584	44	2026	It will be the first Etro branded residences in the world. Designed by Dome+Partners. Topped out in 2026.
26	Ataşehir Modern Arya		177	580	43	2024	Designed by Dome+Partners
27	Mandarin Oriental Etiler T1		170	558	40	2026	Topped out in 2026. Designed by RMJM
28	Gümüş Panorama		170	558	40	2021	Tallest building of the Esenyurt district.
29	Levent 199		170	558	40	2014	Designed by Tabanlıoğlu Architects
30	Andromeda Gold		170	558	52	2013	
31	Soyak Kristalkule		168	551	40	2014	Designed by Pei Cobb Freed&Partners
32	Maya Anatolium Tower		168	551	37	2018	Tallest building in Kartal
33	42 Maslak		167	548	42	2014	
34	42 Maslak		167	548	42	2014	
35	Istanbloom		167	548	44	2013	
36	Selenium Twins		165-138	541	34	2008	
37	Selenium Twins		165-138	541	34	2008	
38	Emaar Square Heights Residences		164	538	34	2018	Designed by Foster + Partners
39	Exen Plaza		160	525	42	2010	
40	Quasar Istanbul Residence		160	524	48	2016	Designed by EAA
41	Fairmont Quasar Istanbul		160	524	48	2016	Designed by EAA
42	Torun Center		160	524	42	2016	Designed by EAA
43	Torun Center		160	524	42	2016	Designed by EAA
44	Torun Center		160	524	42	2016	Designed by EAA
45	Nurol Tower		160	524	32	2015	
46	Divan Residence		159	521	43	2010	
47	Tekstilkent Koza Plaza		158	518	44	2000	
48	Tekstilkent Koza Plaza		158	518	44	2000	
49	Rotana Residences Bomonti		158	518	44	2021	
50	Maslak 1453 A1, A2 and A4		156	512	55	2017	
51	Maslak 1453 A1, A2 and A4		156	512	55	2017	
52	Maslak 1453 A1, A2 and A4		156	512	55	2017	
53	Four Winds Residence		156	512	49	2013	
54	Four Winds Residence		156	512	49	2013	
55	Four Winds Residence		156	512	49	2013	
56	Four Winds Residence		156	512	49	2013	
57	Halk Bank Headquarters Tower 2		156	512	34	2023	
58	River Plaza		156	512	38	2014	
59	Skyland Deluxe Residence		155	508	?	2018	Designed by Broadway Malyan
60	Trump Towers Istanbul Residence Tower		155	508	39	2010	
61	Terrace Tema B		155-145	475		2014	
62	Manzara Adalar A		155	508	40	2015	
63	Metropol Istanbul Tower B and C		155	508	36	2017	Designed by RMJM and Dome+Partners
64	Metropol Istanbul Tower B and C		155	508	36	2017	Designed by RMJM and Dome+Partners
65	Akasya Koru		153	502	44	2014	
66	Şişli Plaza		152	497	46	2007	
67	Sembol Istanbul A		151	497	45	2017	
68	Torun Tower-Deniz Tower		150	492	35	2014	
69	Moment Istanbul		150	492	44	2018	
70	Moment Istanbul		150	492	44	2018	
71	Aris Grand Tower		150	492	42	2018	
72	Bulvar İstanbul Residence		150	492	37	2017	
73	Sheraton Residence Esenyurt		150	492	40	2021	
74	Terrace Lotus		150	492	42	2025	
75	Mandarin Oriental Etiler T2 and T3		150	492	35	2026	Topped out in 2026. Designed by RMJM
76	Mandarin Oriental Etiler T2 and T3		150	492	35	2026	Topped out in 2026. Designed by RMJM
77	Istmarina D		150	492	43	2018	

== Highrises under 150 m ==
	Name	Image	Height (meters)	Floors	Year built	Notes
1	Dumankaya Ikon		149 m (489 ft)	41	2014	
2	Dumankaya Ikon		149 m (489 ft)	41	2014	
3	Dumankaya Ikon		149 m (489 ft)	41	2014	
4	Ataşehir Modern Beste		149 m (489 ft)	35	2024	Designed by Dome+Partners
5	AND Pastel Blue		149 m (489 ft)	41	2019	
6	Varyap Meridian C		148 m (486 ft)	45	2013	
7	Ritim Istanbul A		148 m (486 ft)	39	2016	
8	Radisson Blu Residences Kartal		147 m (482 ft)	36	2025	
9	Antasya Residence		147 m (482 ft)	42	2016	
10	Istmarina C and E		146 m (479 ft)	41	2018	
11	Istmarina C and E		146 m (479 ft)	41	2018	
12	TAT Towers		146 m (479 ft)	34	1998 (Topped Out)	Construction started in 1988. The building topped out in 1998, and the facade was completed in 2002-2003; however, the complex never opened.
13	TAT Towers		146 m (479 ft)	34	1998 (Topped Out)	Construction started in 1988. The building topped out in 1998, and the facade was completed in 2002-2003; however, the complex never opened.
14	Emaar Square Office Tower		146 m (479 ft)	30	2017	Designed by Foster + Partners
15	Trump Towers Istanbul Office Tower		145 m (476 ft)	37	2010	
16	Özyurtlar N Logo B1		144 m (472 ft)	46	2020	
17	Avrupa Ofis Ataşehir		144 m (472 ft)	38	2018	
18	Maslak 1453 B1, B3, A3 and A5		143 m (469 ft)	42	2017	
19	Maslak 1453 B1, B3, A3 and A5		143 m (469 ft)	42	2017	
20	Maslak 1453 B1, B3, A3 and A5		143 m (469 ft)	42	2017	
21	Maslak 1453 B1, B3, A3 and A5		143 m (469 ft)	42	2017	
22	Bomonti Hilton Hotel		143 m (469 ft)	35	2012	
23	Akasya Göl		140 m (460 ft)	41	2014	
24	Kozapark Sedef		140 m (460 ft)	40	2018	Some blocks remain unfinished
25	Kozapark Kınalı		140 m (460 ft)	40	2018	Some blocks remain unfinished
26	Kozapark Burgaz		140 m (460 ft)	40	2018	Some blocks remain unfinished
27	Kozapark Heybeli		140 m (460 ft)	40	2018	Some blocks remain unfinished
28	Kozapark Büyükada		140 m (460 ft)	40	2018	Some blocks remain unfinished
29	Kozapark Bozcaada		140 m (460 ft)	40	2018	Some blocks remain unfinished
30	Kozapark Gökçeada		140 m (460 ft)	40	2018	Some blocks remain unfinished
31	Polat Tower Residence		140 m (460 ft)	40	2001	
32	Bumerang Kartal		140 m (460 ft)	37	2020	
33	Süzer Plaza Ritz-Carlton		140 m (460 ft)	34	2000	
34	Şişli Elit Residence		140 m (460 ft)	35	2000	
35	Nidakule Levent		140 m (460 ft)	27	2016	
36	Ödül Istanbul		140 m (460 ft)	41	2024	
37	Ödül Istanbul		140 m (460 ft)	41	2024	
38	Ödül Istanbul		140 m (460 ft)	41	2024	
39	Ödül Istanbul		140 m (460 ft)	41	2024	
40	Ödül Istanbul		140 m (460 ft)	41	2024	
41	Ödül Istanbul		140 m (460 ft)	41	2024	
42	Ödül Istanbul		140 m (460 ft)	41	2024	
43	Ödül Istanbul		140 m (460 ft)	41	2024	
44	Manzara Adalar B and C		140 m (460 ft)	37	2015	
45	Manzara Adalar B and C		140 m (460 ft)	37	2015	
46	KristalKule Kristalşehir		138 m (453 ft)	36	2025	
47	Burç Istanbul		138 m (453 ft)	36	2020	
48	Onaltı Dokuz 3		138 m (453 ft)	36	2012	
49	Sembol Istanbul B Block		138 m (453 ft)	43	2017	
50	Babacan Premium Residence 1		138 m (453 ft)	39	2019	
51	Wyndham Grand Özdilek		137 m (449 ft)	37	2014	
52	Nidakule Ataşehir North		137 m (449 ft)	30	2016	
53	Sabancı Center 1 - Akbank Tower		136	39	1993	Tallest building in Istanbul between 1993-2000 Designed by Haluk Tümay and Ayhan Böke Contrary to popular belief, its height is 136 meters above ground, and 158 meters including the basement floors.
54	Uprise Elite		136 m (446 ft)	42	2010	
55	Medipol Mega University Hospital Tower		136 m (446 ft)	33	2021	Tallest hospital building in the Turkey
56	Istanbul Financial Center K3		136 m (446 ft)	28	2023	
57	Özyurtlar N Logo B3		135 m (443 ft)	44	2019	
58	Nexus Kartal		135 m (443 ft)	36	2016	
59	Nexus Kartal		135 m (443 ft)	36	2016	
60	Sinpaş Time Residence		134 m (440 ft)	35	2022	
61	Key Plaza-Marriott		134 m (440 ft)	36	2014	
62	Metrocity Residence Towers		133 m (436 ft)	35	2000	Designed by Tekeli Sisa
63	Metrocity Residence Towers		133 m (436 ft)	35	2000	Designed by Tekeli Sisa
64	Metrocity Office Tower		133 m (436 ft)	31	2000	Designed by Tekeli Sisa
65	Ritim Istanbul C Block		133 m (436 ft)	36	2016	
66	ISTMarina S2		133 m (436 ft)	39	2018	
67	Ağaoğlu Sky Towers A		132 m (433 ft)	42	2010	
68	Vadistanbul 1B Block		131 m (430 ft)	30	2017	
69	Varyap Meridian E Block		130 m (430 ft)	41	2014	
70	Eclipse Maslak		130 m (430 ft)	36	2014	
71	Eclipse Maslak		130 m (430 ft)	36	2014	
72	Sun Plaza		130 m (430 ft)	38	2005	
73	Oryapark Residences		130 m (430 ft)	38	2017	
74	Oryapark Residences		130 m (430 ft)	38	2017	
75	IFC Borsa Istanbul		130 m (430 ft)	26	2023	
76	Piazza Residence Tower		130 m (430 ft)	29	2018	
77	G Rotana		130 m (430 ft)	29	2018	
78	DKY Kartal Business		128 m (420 ft)	32	2024	
79	Çukurova Tower		128 m (420 ft)	37	2014	
80	Avrupa Residences Yamanevler 1 and 2		128 m (420 ft)	36	2024	
81	Avrupa Residences Yamanevler 1 and 2		128 m (420 ft)	36	2024	
83	Kempinski Residences Astoria		127 m (417 ft)	27	2007	
84	Kempinski Residences Astoria		127 m (417 ft)	27	2007	
85	Ağaoğlu 212 My Office		126 m (413 ft)	31	2011	
86	Sembol Istanbul C Block		126 m (413 ft)	37	2017	
87	Bizz Tower		126 m (413 ft)	36	2021	
88	Kuriş Plaza		126 m (413 ft)	29	2015	
89	Vakıf Bank Headquarters Tower 2		125 m (410 ft)	27	2023	Designed by Aukett Swanke
90	G Yoo		125 m (410 ft)	35	2018	
91	G Wanda Vista Istanbul		125 m (410 ft)	35	2018	
92	Göl Panorama A Block		124 m (407 ft)	35	2017	
93	Onaltı Dokuz 2		124 m (407 ft)		2012	
94	Mashattan B1, B2, B3, B4 and B5		124 m (407 ft)	33	2007	
95	Mashattan B1, B2, B3, B4 and B5		124 m (407 ft)	33	2007	
96	Mashattan B1, B2, B3, B4 and B5		124 m (407 ft)	33	2007	
97	Mashattan B1, B2, B3, B4 and B5		124 m (407 ft)	33	2007	
98	Mashattan B1, B2, B3, B4 and B5		124 m (407 ft)	33	2007	
99	Terrace Tema A		124–114 m (407–374 ft)		2014	
100	Toya Next		123 m (404 ft)	36	2022	
101	Onur Parklife		123 m (404 ft)	35	2021	
102	Deluxia Park Residence		123 m (404 ft)	37	2024	
103	Ritim Istanbul E		123 m (404 ft)	34	2016	
104	Kanyon Office Tower		123 m (404 ft)	30	2006	
105	Akros Istanbul		122 m (400 ft)	35	2020	
106	Garanti Bank Headquarters - Olive Grove Tower		122 m (400 ft)	22	2002	Designed by Gerner, Kronick + Valcarcel Architects The building is 110 meters tall from Büyükdere Avenue entrance
107	Pega Kartal		122 m (400 ft)	32	2019	
108	Özyurtlar N Logo B2		122 m (400 ft)		2019	
109	Gürel Fındık Residence		122 m (400 ft)	33	2023	
110	Istanbul Financial Center S1		122 m (400 ft)	25	2023	
111	Helis More Residence		121 m (397 ft)	31	2019	
112	Zorlu Plaza-IGU Tower		121 m (397 ft)	30	1999	
113	Şişli TAT Center		121 m (397 ft)		1999-2002 (Topped Out)	Construction started in 1997.Topped out in early 2000's (?) but never completed.
114	Şişli TAT Center		121 m (397 ft)		1999-2002 (Topped Out)	Construction started in 1997.Topped out in early 2000's (?) but never completed.
115	Dumankaya Vizyon A		121 m (397 ft)	33	2010	
116	Avrupa Residence Oryapark I		120 m (390 ft)	35	2026	
117	Brandium Residence R2 and R3		120 m (390 ft)	32	2013	
118	Brandium Residence R2 and R3		120 m (390 ft)	32	2013	
119	Trendist Ataşehir A1, A2 and A3		120 m (390 ft)	33	2016	
120	Trendist Ataşehir A1, A2 and A3		120 m (390 ft)	33	2016	
121	Trendist Ataşehir A1, A2 and A3		120 m (390 ft)	33	2016	
122	Teknik Yapı Metropark B1		120 m (390 ft)	38	2016	
123	ISTMarina S1		120 m (390 ft)	36	2018	
124	Mashattan A1, A2, A3, A4 and A5		120 m (390 ft)	33	2007	
125	Mashattan A1, A2, A3, A4 and A5		120 m (390 ft)	33	2007	
126	Mashattan A1, A2, A3, A4 and A5		120 m (390 ft)	33	2007	
127	Mashattan A1, A2, A3, A4 and A5		120 m (390 ft)	33	2007	
128	Mashattan A1, A2, A3, A4 and A5		120 m (390 ft)	33	2007	
130	Newista Residence 1		120 m (390 ft)	34	2014	
131	Balance Güneşli		120 m (390 ft)	30	2018	
132	Ferko Signature		120 m (390 ft)	30	2018	
133	Skyport Tower		120 m (390 ft)	34	2010	
134	Sheraton Grand Ataşehir-Varyap Meridian Business		120 m (390 ft)	27	2014	
135	Nidakule Kozyatağı		120 m (390 ft)	30	2003	
136	Mesa Koz		120 m (390 ft)	28	2021	
137	Özyurtlar N Logo A1, A2, A3 and a4		120 m (390 ft)	40	2021	
138	Özyurtlar N Logo A1, A2, A3 and a4		120 m (390 ft)	40	2021	
139	Özyurtlar N Logo A1, A2, A3 and a4		120 m (390 ft)	40	2021	
140	Özyurtlar N Logo A1, A2, A3 and a4		120 m (390 ft)	40	2021	
141	Demir La Vida Hotel Tower		120 m (390 ft)	35	2019	Topped out in 2019.
142	Nidakule Küçükyalı A4 and C3		119 m (390 ft)	30	2023	
143	Nidakule Küçükyalı A4 and C3		119 m (390 ft)	30	2026	
144	NG Residences A		119 m (390 ft)	28	2019	
145	Türkiye Finans Genel Müdürlük Binası		118 m (387 ft)	28	2016	
146	Palladium Residence		118 m (387 ft)	32	2008	
147	Sabancı Center 2		118 m (387 ft)	34	1993	Designed by Haluk Tümay and Ayhan Böke Contrary to popular belief, its height is 118 meters above ground, and 140 meters including the basement floors.
148	İşbank Tower 2 and 3		118 m (387 ft)	36	2000	Designed by Swanke Hayden Connell Architects and Tekeli-Sisa.
149	İşbank Tower 2 and 3		118 m (387 ft)	36	2000	Designed by Swanke Hayden Connell Architects and Tekeli-Sisa.
150	Mall of Istanbul Office Tower		118 m (387 ft)	36	2014	
151	Mall of Istanbul D Block		118 m (387 ft)		2014	
152	Empire Istanbul		118 m (387 ft)	32	2021	
153	Adım Istanbul A2		118 m (387 ft)		2019	
154	Avrupa Konutları Yamanevler 3 and 4		118 m (387 ft)	34	2021	
155	Avrupa Konutları Yamanevler 3 and 4		118 m (387 ft)	34	2021	
156	Sinpaş I Tower		117 m (384 ft)	31	2012	
157	Kartalkule		117 m (384 ft)	25	2015	
158	Oyak Dragos Office Tower		117 m (384 ft)	33	2023	
159	Tekfen Tower		116 m (381 ft)	28	2003	Designed by Swanke Hayden Connell Architects
160	Batışehir K1		116 m (381 ft)	31	2015	
161	Oryapark Plaza A		116 m (381 ft)	34	2014	
162	Nidakule Göztepe		116 m (381 ft)	32	2012	
163	DAP Royal Center 1		116 m (381 ft)	30	2013	
164	Nuvo Dragos A		115 m (377 ft)	30	2014	
165	Dumankaya Mix A		115 m (377 ft)	32	2014	
166	Nidapark Seyrantepe		115 m (377 ft)	28	2017	
167	Nidapark Seyrantepe		115 m (377 ft)	28	2017	
168	Kiptaş Vaditepe A1		114 m (374 ft)		2016	
169	AND Plaza Kozyatağı		114 m (374 ft)	25	2015	
170	Nissa O2 Residence		114 m (374 ft)	37	2014	
171	Brandium Residence R1 and R4		114 m (374 ft)	32	2013	
172	Brandium Residence R1 and R4		114 m (374 ft)	32	2013	
173	Canan Residence A		114 m (374 ft)		2010	
174	Teknik Yapı Metropark B2		114 m (374 ft)	36	2016	
175	Beybi Giz Plaza		113 m (371 ft)	34	1996	
176	Kentplus Centrium Tower		113 m (371 ft)	37	2013	
177	Emlak Konut Başakşehir Phase 1 Section 1 D		112 m (367 ft)		2016	
178	Adım Istanbul A3		112 m (367 ft)		2018	
179	Nidakule Kayaşehir		112 m (367 ft)	27	2023	
180	Polat Tower Basın Ekspres		112 m (367 ft)		2019	
181	Mall of Istanbul C Block		112 m (367 ft)		2014	
182	Mall of Istanbul Hilton		112 m (367 ft)		2020	
183	Istanbul Financial Center D		112 m (367 ft)	23	2023	
184	Atapark Residences C2		111 m (364 ft)		2016	
185	Ağaoğlu My Towerland 3381-3 C1, C2 and D		111 m (364 ft)		2012	
186	Ağaoğlu My Towerland 3381-3 C1, C2 and D		111 m (364 ft)		2012	
187	Ağaoğlu My Towerland 3381-3 C1, C2 and D		111 m (364 ft)		2012	
188	Emlak Konut Başakşehir Phase 1 Section 3 D Block		110 m (360 ft)		2016	
189	Kristalşehir		110 m (360 ft)	36	2014-2017	
190	Kristalşehir		110 m (360 ft)	36	2014-2017	
191	Kristalşehir		110 m (360 ft)	36	2014-2017	
192	Kristalşehir		110 m (360 ft)	36	2014-2017	
193	Kristalşehir		110 m (360 ft)	36	2014-2017	
194	Kristalşehir		110 m (360 ft)	36	2014-2017	
195	Kristalşehir		110 m (360 ft)	36	2014-2017	
196	Kristalşehir		110 m (360 ft)	36	2014-2017	
197	Kristalşehir		110 m (360 ft)	36	2014-2017	
198	Kristalşehir		110 m (360 ft)	36	2014-2017	
199	Kristalşehir		110 m (360 ft)	36	2014-2017	
200	Kristalşehir		110 m (360 ft)	36	2014-2017	
201	Le Méridien Istanbul Etiler Hotel		110 m (360 ft)	31	2011	
202	Istanbul Marriott Asia		110 m (360 ft)	22	2007	
203	Golden Tulips		110 m (360 ft)	28	2018	
204	Royal Garden A		110 m (360 ft)	30	2020	
205	Referans Kartal A		110 m (360 ft)	33	2018	
206	Ağaoğlu My Home Maslak		110 m (360 ft)	30	2014	
207	Ağaoğlu My Home Maslak		110 m (360 ft)	30	2014	
208	Ağaoğlu My Home Maslak		110 m (360 ft)	30	2014	
209	Şişli TAT Center Hotel Tower		110 m (360 ft)	22	2000-2002 (Topped Out)	Construction started in 1997.Topped out in early 2000's (?) but never completed.
210	Altower		109 m (358 ft)	32	2024	
211	NG Residences B		109 m (358 ft)	26	2019	
212	Ağaoğlu My Towerland 3385 C		108 m (354 ft)		2012	
213	Ağaoğlu My Towerland 3377 C		108 m (354 ft)		2012	
214	Ağaoğlu My Towerland 3379 C		108 m (354 ft)		2012	
215	Atapark Residences C3, C4 and C5		108 m (354 ft)		2016	
216	Atapark Residences C3, C4 and C5		108 m (354 ft)		2016	
217	Atapark Residences C3, C4 and C5		108 m (354 ft)		2016	
218	Uphill Court		108 m (354 ft)	33	2008	
219	Uphill Court		108 m (354 ft)	33	2008	
220	Kaya Ramada Plaza Hotel		108 m (354 ft)	25	2002	
221	Roya Nova Residence		108 m (354 ft)	32	2022	
222	Mesa Kartal		108 m (354 ft)	31	2015	
223	Spradon Vadi A1		108 m (354 ft)	36	2014	
224	Onaltı Dokuz 1		107 m (351 ft)		2012	
225	Avangarden - Londra Tower		107 m (351 ft)	26	2007	
226	Buyaka		106 m (348 ft)		2012	
227	Buyaka		106 m (348 ft)		2012	
228	Buyaka		106 m (348 ft)		2012	
229	Buyaka		106 m (348 ft)		2012	
230	Ağaoğlu My World Andromeda C8		106 m (348 ft)		2007	
231	EVvel Istanbul D		106 m (348 ft)		2017	
232	Emlak Konut Başakşehir Phase 1 Section 4 D		106 m (348 ft)		2016	
233	Emlak Katılım Bank Headquarters Tower		106 m (348 ft)		2018	
234	G Tower		106 m (348 ft)		2020	
235	DAP Royal Center 2		106 m (348 ft)	27	2013	
236	Zorlu Center		106 m (348 ft)	32	2012	
237	Zorlu Center		106 m (348 ft)	32	2012	
238	Zorlu Center		106 m (348 ft)	32	2012	
239	Zorlu Center		106 m (348 ft)	32	2012	
240	Polaris Plaza		106 m (348 ft)	28	1999	
241	Medikule İstanbul		106 m (348 ft)	30	2014	
242	Medikule İstanbul		106 m (348 ft)	30	2014	
243	Adım Istanbul A1		105 m (344 ft)		2018	
244	Newada Residence B		105 m (344 ft)		2014	
245	AI Office Building		105 m (344 ft)	23	2007	
246	Mall of Istanbul B Block		105 m (344 ft)		2014	
247	Akyaka Office Tower		105 m (344 ft)	25	2015	
248	Selenium Residence		104 m (341 ft)	30	2004	
249	Delta Dubai Comfort		104 m (341 ft)	31	2022	
250	DoubleTree by Hilton Avcılar		104 m (341 ft)	27	2012	
251	Dap Teras Towers		104 m (341 ft)	31	2019	
252	Dap Teras Towers		104 m (341 ft)	31	2019	
253	Ataşehir Modern Opera Block		104 m (341 ft)	25	2024	Designed by Dome+Partners
254	Kiptaş Vaditepe A2		104 m (341 ft)		2016	
255	Yapı Kredi Headquarters		104 m (341 ft)	23	1999	
256	Nidapark Başakşehir A		104 m (341 ft)	31	2017	
257	Arista Bomonti Business		103 m (338 ft)	26	2014	
258	Maya Akar Center		103 m (338 ft)	30	1992	
259	Atapark Residences C1		103 m (338 ft)		2016	
260	Kartal 101		103 m (338 ft)	32	2017	
261	Medicana Zincirlikuyu Hospital - Gap Tower		103 m (338 ft)	25	2016	Renovated and became a hospital in 2023
262	Ağaoğlu Sky Towers B		102 m (335 ft)	32	2010	
263	Vadistanbul 7B		102 m (335 ft)	24	2018	
264	Emlak Konut Başakşehir Phase 1 Section 2 D		102 m (335 ft)		2016	
265	Park Mavera 1 Başakşehir B2		102 m (335 ft)		2017	
266	Elite World Hotel Basın Ekspres		102 m (335 ft)	25	2017	
267	Mai Residence		102 m (335 ft)	29	2015	
268	Avrupa Konutları Yamanevler 5,6,7 and 8		102 m (335 ft)		2021	
269	Avrupa Konutları Yamanevler 5,6,7 and 8		102 m (335 ft)		2021	
270	Avrupa Konutları Yamanevler 5,6,7 and 8		102 m (335 ft)		2021	
271	Avrupa Konutları Yamanevler 5,6,7 and 8		102 m (335 ft)		2021	
272	Spradon Vadi A2		102 m (335 ft)	34	2014	
273	Ağaoğlu My World Europe Pool Residence		102 m (335 ft)	32	2013	
274	Ağaoğlu My World Europe Pool Residence		102 m (335 ft)	32	2013	
275	Ağaoğlu My World Europe Pool Residence		102 m (335 ft)	32	2013	
276	Ağaoğlu My World Europe Pool Residence		102 m (335 ft)	32	2013	
277	Ağaoğlu My World Europe Pool Residence		102 m (335 ft)	32	2013	
278	Ağaoğlu My World Europe Pool Residence		102 m (335 ft)	32	2013	
279	Flora Residence		101 m (331 ft)	33	2007	
280	Selenium Panorama		101 m (331 ft)	26	2008	
281	Skyblue Kartal		101 m (331 ft)	27	2017	
282	Tual Adalar B		101 m (331 ft)		2020	
283	Samsun Towers		100 m (330 ft)		2018	
284	Samsun Towers		100 m (330 ft)		2018	
285	Samsun Towers		100 m (330 ft)		2018	
286	Crown Tower		100 m (330 ft)	35	2012	
287	Asfor Kartal		100 m (330 ft)	27	2018	
288	Ağaoğlu My Towerland 3383 C		100 m (330 ft)		2013	
289	Marmara Kule		100 m (330 ft)	31	2018	
290	Hilton Maslak		100 m (330 ft)	26	1990	
291	Hepistanbul P4 Block		100 m (330 ft)	30	2017	
292	Özyurtlar Ntowers		100 m (330 ft)	33	2012	
293	Özyurtlar Ntowers		100 m (330 ft)	33	2012	
294	Özyurtlar Ntowers		100 m (330 ft)	33	2012	
295	Özyurtlar Ntowers		100 m (330 ft)	33	2012	
296	Özyurtlar Ntowers		100 m (330 ft)	33	2012	
297	NEF 36 B Block		100 m (330 ft)		2023	
298	Istanbul Financial Center S2		100 m (330 ft)	20	2023	
299	Maslak 1453 B2-Yıldırım Tower		100 m (330 ft)		2017	

== Highrises around 100-80 m ==
	Name	Image	Height (meters)	Floors	Year built	Notes
1	Mall of Istanbul A Block		98 m (322 ft)		2014	
2	Elite City C		98 m (322 ft)	31	2013	
3	Almina Tower		98 m (322 ft)	31	2018	
4	Allure Tower		98 m (322 ft)	32	2015	
5	Mermerler Plaza		98 m (322 ft)	24	2016	
6	Delta Deluxe 1		98 m (322 ft)	30	2016	
7	Sheraton Ataköy		97 m (318 ft)	25	1990	
8	Propa Vista		97 m (318 ft)	26	2018	
9	Daire Kartal		96 m (315 ft)	26	2017	
10	Hepistanbul E3		96 m (315 ft)	29	2017	
11	Safi Espadon		96 m (315 ft)	27	2014	
12	Tema İstanbul B-15		96 m (315 ft)	32	2015	
13	Ottomare Suites		95 m (312 ft)	29	2013	
14	Tual Adalar C		95 m (312 ft)		2020	
15	Sheraton Levent		95 m (312 ft)	25	2002	
16	Ağaoğlu My World Europe Golf Residences		95 m (312 ft)	30	2013	
17	Ağaoğlu My World Europe Golf Residences		95 m (312 ft)	30	2013	
18	Ağaoğlu My World Europe Golf Residences		95 m (312 ft)	30	2013	
19	Ağaoğlu My World Europe Golf Residences		95 m (312 ft)	30	2013	
20	Ağaoğlu My World Europe Golf Residences		95 m (312 ft)	30	2013	
21	Rönesans Sayfiye B		94 m (308 ft)	29	2015	
22	Maslak Square		94 m (308 ft)	23	2022	
22	FDN Plaza		94 m (308 ft)	24	2024	
23	Dumankaya Vizyon B		94 m (308 ft)	26	2010	
24	InterContinental Istanbul		93 m (305 ft)	25	1975	
25	Park Plaza		93 m (305 ft)	23	1998	
26	Hepistanbul P3		93 m (305 ft)	28	2017	
27	Dilman Towers		93 m (305 ft)	27	2009	
28	Dilman Towers		93 m (305 ft)	27	2009	
29	Piazza Office Tower		92 m (302 ft)	21	2018	
30	Levent Loft II		92 m (302 ft)	22	2009	
31	Tual Adalar A		92 m (302 ft)		2020	
32	Akkom Ofis Park 1 - Albaraka Türk Headquarters		91 m (299 ft)	23	2010	
33	Apa Giz		91 m (299 ft)	24	2009	
34	AND Pastel Orange 3		91 m (299 ft)		2019	
35	Mete Plaza		91 m (299 ft)	26	1997	
36	DAP Adam Kule		91 m (299 ft)	27	2018	
37	Sinpaş İstanbul Sarayları 27A and 27B		90 m (300 ft)		2014	
38	Sinpaş İstanbul Sarayları 27A and 27B		90 m (300 ft)		2014	
39	Delta Deluxe 2		90 m (300 ft)	27	2016	
40	D-Ofis Maslak		90 m (300 ft)	21	2018	
41	Turkuaz Media Center		90 m (300 ft)	22	2019	
42	Turkuaz Media Center		90 m (300 ft)	22	2019	
43	Bellevue Residences		90 m (300 ft)	22	2007	
44	Bellevue Residences		90 m (300 ft)	22	2007	
45	Fortis Sinanlı		90 m (300 ft)	26	2019	
46	Fortis Sinanlı		90 m (300 ft)	26	2019	
47	Fortis Sinanlı		90 m (300 ft)	26	2019	
48	Fortis Sinanlı		90 m (300 ft)	26	2019	
49	Fortis Sinanlı		90 m (300 ft)	26	2019	
50	Torkam Fikirtepe Tall Block		90 m (300 ft)	28	2021	
51	Kiptaş Yeşilvadi		90 m (300 ft)	25	2007	
52	Akkom Ofis Park 2 - Cessas Plaza		89 m (292 ft)	23	2010	
53	Akmerkez Residence		88 m (289 ft)	23	1993	
54	Gökdeniz Kartal		88 m (289 ft)	26	2016	
55	Gökdeniz Kartal		88 m (289 ft)	26	2016	
56	Koru Residence		88 m (289 ft)	26	2017	
57	Kentplus Kadıköy A and B		87 m (285 ft)	25	2017	
58	Kentplus Kadıköy A and B		87 m (285 ft)	25	2017	
59	Güney Plaza-Burgan Bank Headquarters		87 m (285 ft)	26	2005	
60	Vogue Business Center		87 m (285 ft)	23	2016	
61	Ant Kule		87 m (285 ft)	20	2023	
62	Ağaoğlu My World Europe Arena Residences		87 m (285 ft)	26	2013	
63	Ağaoğlu My World Europe Arena Residences		87 m (285 ft)	26	2013	
64	Sinpaş İstanbul Sarayları 26 and 28		87 m (285 ft)		2014	
65	Sinpaş İstanbul Sarayları 26 and 28		87 m (285 ft)		2014	
66	Hepistanbul H4 and P2		86 m (282 ft)	26	2017	
67	Hepistanbul H4 and P2		86 m (282 ft)	26	2017	
68	Elysium Art Suites		86 m (282 ft)	28	2016	
69	5. Levent Residence		86 m (282 ft)	26	2018	
70	5. Levent Residence		86 m (282 ft)	26	2018	
71	Düet Çiftehavuzlar A		86 m (282 ft)	26	2018	
72	Istanbul Panorama Evleri		86 m (282 ft)	26	2019	
73	Istanbul Panorama Evleri		86 m (282 ft)	26	2019	
74	Göztepe Büyükhanlı Residence		86 m (282 ft)	23	2012	
75	Tema İstanbul B-9h and B-18h		86 m (282 ft)	29	2015	
76	Tema İstanbul B-9h and B-18h		86 m (282 ft)	29	2015	
77	Vadi Kule		86 m (282 ft)	23	2016	
78	Narkule		86 m (282 ft)	27	2011	
79	Renaissance Polat Hotel		85 m (279 ft)	26	1993	
80	The Marmara Taksim		85 m (279 ft)	28	1976	
81	Harmancı Giz		85 m (279 ft)	23	2000	
82	Selectum City Ataşehir		85 m (279 ft)	21	2013	
83	Spring Giz Plaza		85 m (279 ft)	25	1994	
84	Kanyon Residence		85 m (279 ft)	23	2006	
85	Ikiz Konaklar		85 m (279 ft)	27	2015	
86	Ikiz Konaklar		85 m (279 ft)	27	2015	
87	Sinpaş Bosphorus City Göl Kule		85 m (279 ft)	28	2011	
88	Sinpaş Bosphorus City Göl Kule		85 m (279 ft)	28	2011	
89	Pırlanta Göztepe C		85 m (279 ft)	26	2018	
90	Business Istanbul A and B		85 m (279 ft)	20	2017	
91	Business Istanbul A and B		85 m (279 ft)	20	2017	
92	Akkom Ofis Park 3 - Kelif Plaza		85 m (279 ft)	23	2010	
93	Harbiye Orduevi		84 m (276 ft)	21	1974	
94	Ritz Carlton Residences Istanbul		84 m (276 ft)	22	1975	Renovated in 2021
95	Maslak HSBC Headquarters		84 m (276 ft)	19	2001	
96	Nurol Plaza Maslak		84 m (276 ft)	21	1997	
97	Babacan Premium Residence 2,3,4 and 5		84 m (276 ft)	26	2019	
98	Babacan Premium Residence 2,3,4 and 5		84 m (276 ft)	26	2019	
99	Babacan Premium Residence 2,3,4 and 5		84 m (276 ft)	26	2019	
100	Babacan Premium Residence 2,3,4 and 5		84 m (276 ft)	26	2019	
101	Veko Giz Plaza		84 m (276 ft)	22	2007	
102	Gül Park Yaşam		84 m (276 ft)	27	2016	
103	Nidakule Ataşehir South		84 m (276 ft)	16	2016	
104	Nuhoglu Yenitepe Phase 2		84 m (276 ft)	24	2018	
105	Nuhoglu Yenitepe Phase 2		84 m (276 ft)	24	2018	
106	Hepistanbul E2		84 m (276 ft)	25	2017	
107	First Avenue Residence A, B and C		83 m (272 ft)	25	2020	
108	First Avenue Residence A, B and C		83 m (272 ft)	25	2020	
109	First Avenue Residence A, B and C		83 m (272 ft)	25	2020	
110	Reform Maslak		83 m (272 ft)	22	2016	
111	Maslak No 1		83 m (272 ft)	21	2014	
112	Concord Istanbul A1, A2, C1 and C2		83 m (272 ft)	25	2017	
113	Concord Istanbul A1, A2, C1 and C2		83 m (272 ft)	25	2017	
114	Concord Istanbul A1, A2, C1 and C2		83 m (272 ft)	25	2018	
115	Concord Istanbul A1, A2, C1 and C2		83 m (272 ft)	25	2018	
116	Sinpaş İstanbul Sarayları 35		82 m (269 ft)		2014	
117	Delta Deluxe 3		82 m (269 ft)	23	2016	
118	Iz Giz Plaza		82 m (269 ft)	28	2003	
119	Newista Residence 2		82 m (269 ft)	23	2014	
120	5. Levent E1 and E2		82 m (269 ft)	25	2018	
121	5. Levent E1 and E2		82 m (269 ft)	25	2018	
122	Royal Garden		82 m (269 ft)	23	2020	
123	Uphill Court Plot B		82 m (269 ft)	26	2008	
124	Uphill Court Plot B		82 m (269 ft)	26	2008	
125	Uphill Court Plot B		82 m (269 ft)	26	2008	
126	Giz 2000 Plaza		81 m (266 ft)	27	1999	
127	4B Plaza		81 m (266 ft)	20	2017	
128	Ferah Residence		80 m (260 ft)	24	2019	
129	Hepistanbul H3 and E1		80 m (260 ft)	24	2017	
130	Hepistanbul H3 and E1		80 m (260 ft)	24	2017	
131	Concord Istanbul B1		80 m (260 ft)	24	2017	
132	Kiptaş İçerenköy Houses Tall Block		80 m (260 ft)	24	2009	
133	Baytur Kozyatağı Houses C and D		80 m (260 ft)	25	2007	
134	Baytur Kozyatağı Houses C and D		80 m (260 ft)	25	2007	
135	Eston Beyazıt Terraced Houses		80 m (260 ft)	26	1998	
136	Torkam Fikirtepe Short Blocks		80 m (260 ft)	25	2021	
137	Torkam Fikirtepe Short Blocks		80 m (260 ft)	25	2021	
138	Torkam Fikirtepe Short Blocks		80 m (260 ft)	25	2021	
139	Torkam Fikirtepe Short Blocks		80 m (260 ft)	25	2021	
140	Deluxia Dragos		80 m (260 ft)	25	2013	
141	Kartal Life		80 m (260 ft)	25	2018	
142	Kentplus Kadıköy C		80 m (260 ft)	25	2017	
143	Oryapark Plaza B - Crowne Plaza		80 m (260 ft)	21	2014	

Updated as of 8 July 2026.

- This list includes only completed or topped-out structures.

== Buildings under construction ==
Rank	Name	Height	Floors	Year
1	Swissotel Kozapark	225 m (738 ft)	52 (Stopped at 19-20th floor)	Stopped at 2017
2	Etro Residences-Rams Beyond	178 m (584 ft)	44	2026
3	Mandarin Oriental Etiler T1	170 m (560 ft)	40	2027
4	Mandarin Oriental Etiler T2-T3	150 m (490 ft)	35	2027
5	Mandarin Oriental Etiler T2-T3	150 m (490 ft)	35	2027
6	Taşyapı Şişli	144 m (472 ft)	37	2028
7	Taşyapı Şişli	144 m (472 ft)	37	2028
8	Taşyapı Şişli	144 m (472 ft)	37	2028
9	Taşyapı Şişli	144 m (472 ft)	37	2028
10	Phantom Residence	142 m (466 ft) ?	42	?
11	Taşyapı Kaptanpaşa Office Tower	139 m (456 ft)	34	Prep
12	Adozer Plaza	128 m (420 ft)	33	Prep
13	Avrupa Residence Oryapark I	120 m (390 ft)	35	2026
14	Taşyapı Kaptanpaşa Residence Tower	111 m (364 ft)	27	Prep
15	AC Hotels Marriott Şişli	106 m (348 ft)	28	Prep
16	Prime Tower Maslak	105 m (344 ft)	25	Prep
17	Prime Tower Maslak	105 m (344 ft)	25	Prep
18	Prime Tower Maslak	105 m (344 ft)	25	Prep

== Timeline of tallest buildings in Istanbul ==
Name	Height	Floors	Year
Harbiye Orduevi	84 m (276 ft)	21	1974-1975
InterContinental Istanbul	93 m (305 ft)	25	1975–1990
Princess Hotel-Hilton Maslak	100 m (330 ft)	26	1990-1992
Maya Akar Center	103 m (338 ft)	30	1992-1993
Akbank Tower	136 m (446 ft)	39	1993-2000
Isbank Tower 1	181 m (594 ft)	52	2000–2009
Istanbul Sapphire	261 m (856 ft)	54	2011-2017
Skyland İstanbul	284 m (932 ft)	65	2017-2018
Metropol Istanbul Tower	301 m (988 ft)	70	2018–2024
CBRT Tower	354 m (1,161 ft)	62	2024–present

== See also ==
- List of tallest buildings in Turkey
