= Metropol Istanbul =

Complex of mixed-use skyscrapers in the Ataşehir neighborhood in Istanbul, Turkey

Metropol Istanbul Tower
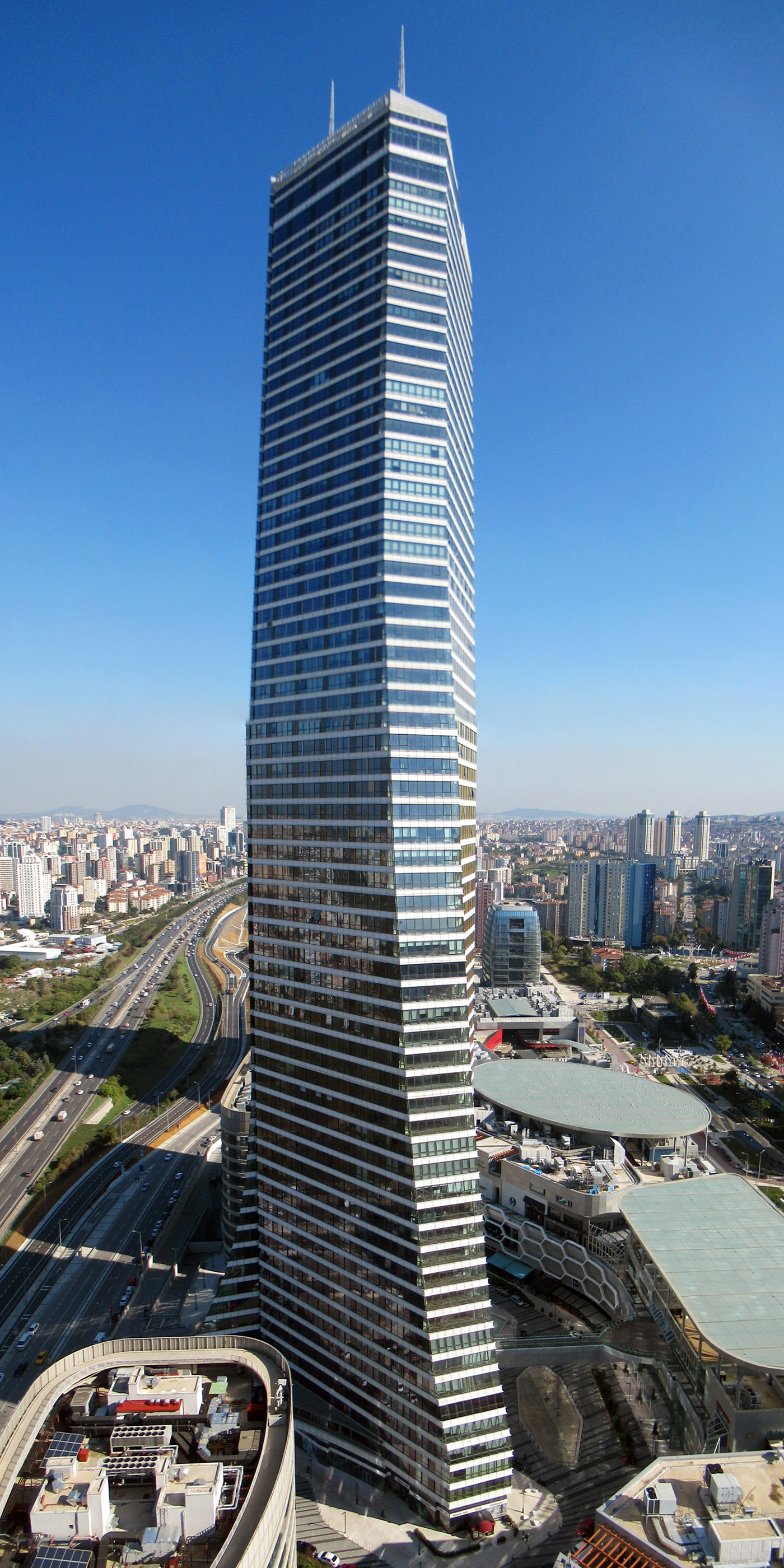
- Metropol Istanbul Tower A
- Interactive map of the Metropol Istanbul Tower area

General information
- Status: Completed
- Type: Hotel, Residential, Office
- Location: Ataşehir, Istanbul, Turkey
- Coordinates: 40.9945°N 29.1219°E
- Construction started: 2013
- Opening: 2018
- Cost: US$800,000,000

Height
- Tip: 301 m (988 ft)
- Roof: 280 m (920 ft)

Technical details
- Floor count: 70

Design and construction
- Architect: RMJM
- Developer: Kadva Corporation

Other information
- Public transit access: Kozyatağı

Website
- www.metropolistanbul.com

Metropol İstanbul is a mixed-use skyscraper complex in Ertuğrul in the Ataşehir district on the Asian side of Istanbul, Turkey. The complex consists of three towers, a residential tower (150 m), an office tower (150 m) and a main tower (280 m at roof level, 301 m including its twin spires), a hotel, and one of the largest shopping centers in Turkey with a 16 screen cinema. The project was proposed in 2011. The first phase of the building complex was opened in 2018 while the shopping mall portion opened in 2019. The residential and office blocks measure more than 800 thousand m². The complex cost $800 million to construct and is now the second tallest building in Istanbul and Turkey.

== Tower ==
The tower was opened in 2018, designed by Architectural Firm RMJM. Its height reaches 301 m (987 ft 6 in) including the twin spires at top, while its height at the roof level is 280 m (918 ft 8 in). It has 70 floors above ground level.

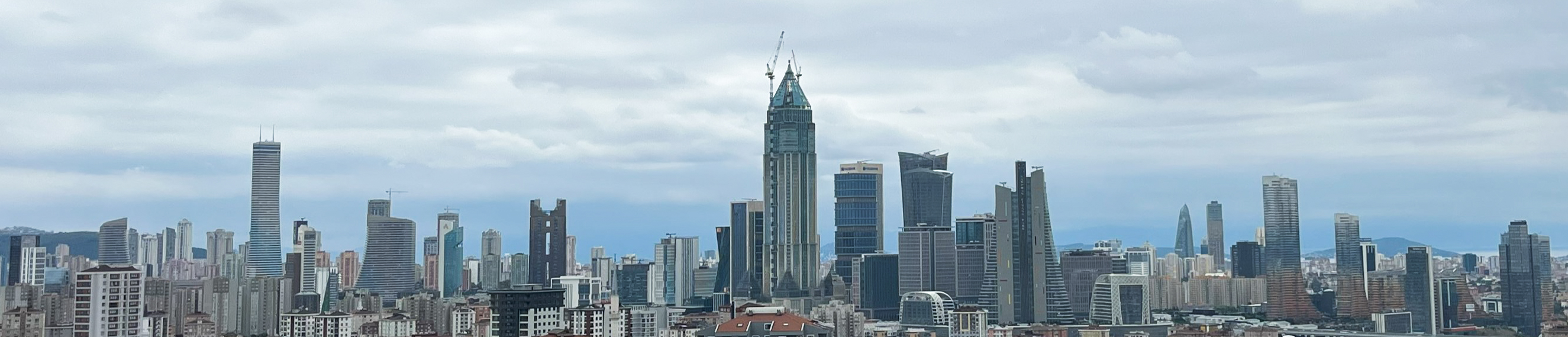
Skyline of Ataşehir district on the Asian side of Istanbul, with the Metropol Istanbul Towers at left and Istanbul Financial Center (with the CBRT Tower at its core) at the center of the frame.

== Shopping center ==
The shopping center was designed by Roy Higgs International. It contains 104,146 m^{2} of gross leasable area. The major tenants include:

- Hupalupa amusement center, 8,960 m^{2}
- Boyner department store, 6,600 m^{2}
- Cinematica multicinema 5,297 m^{2}
- John Reed Fitness gym, 4,385 m^{2}
- Das Das theater, 3,843 m^{2}
- Carrefour SA hypermarket, 3,273 m^{2}
- LC Waikiki clothing store, 2,455 m^{2}
- Media Markt electronics, 2,335 m^{2}
- Beymen department store, 1,865 m^{2}
- FDR amusement center, 1,741^{2}
- Evidea homewares, 1,448 m^{2}
- Marks & Spencer, 1,323 m^{2}
- Paşabahçe homewares, 1,055 m^{2}

== Exhibitions ==
- Body Worlds: Animal Inside Out

== See also ==
- List of tallest buildings in Istanbul
- List of tallest buildings in Turkey
- List of tallest buildings in Europe

Records
Preceded by Skyland İstanbul	Tallest Building in Istanbul; 2017—2024; 301m	Succeeded by CBRT Tower
Preceded by Skyland İstanbul	Tallest Building in Turkey; 2017—2024; 301m	Succeeded by CBRT Tower
