= Tekfen Tower =

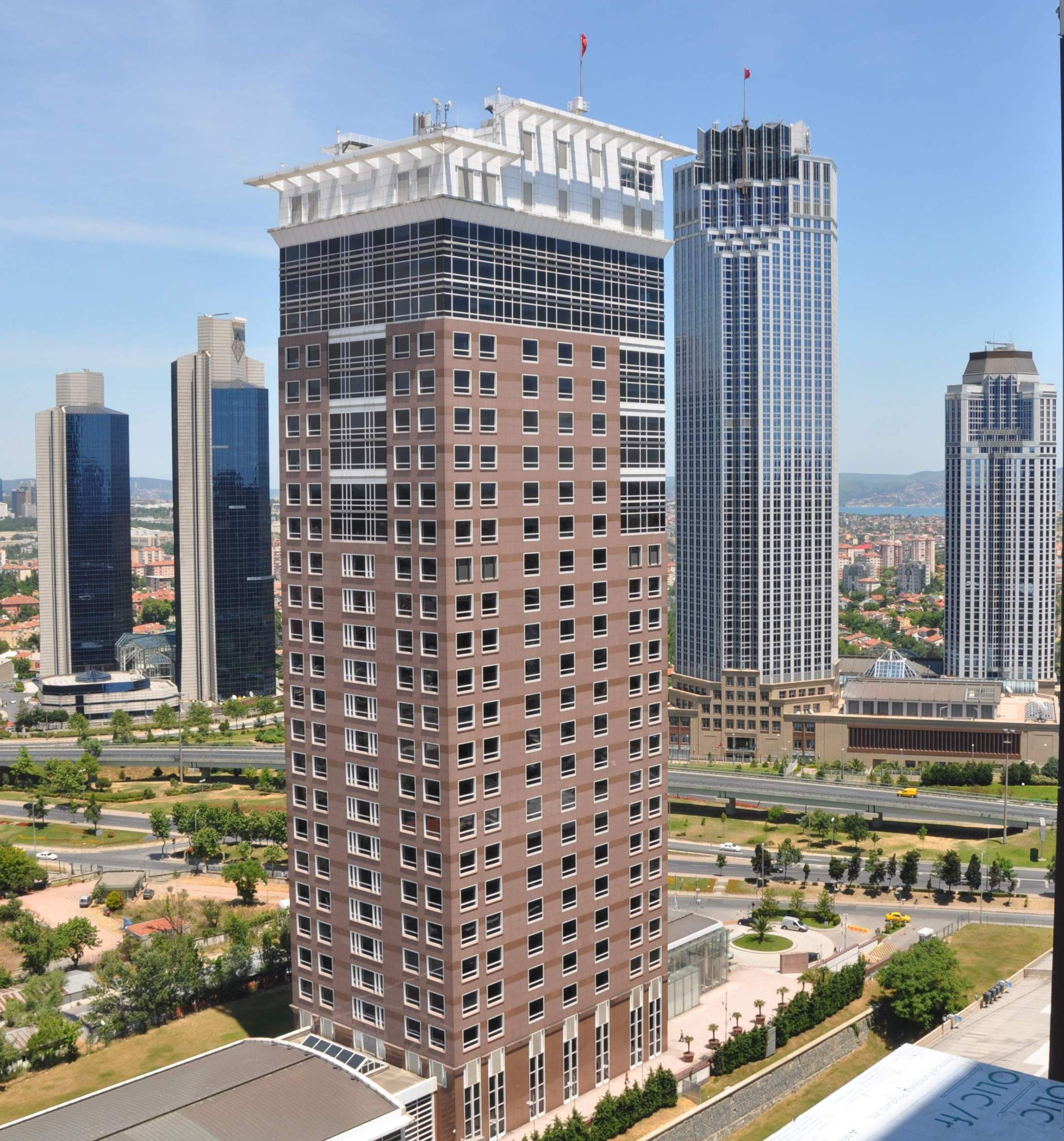
- Interactive map of the Tekfen Tower area

General information
- Type: Mixed–Use
- Location: Levent, Istanbul, Turkey, Tekfen Tower, Büyükdere Caddesi, No:209
- Coordinates: 41°04′55″N 29°00′32″E
- Opening: 2002

Height
- Roof: 118 m (387 ft)

Technical details
- Floor count: 28

Design and construction
- Architect: Swanke Hayden Connell Architects

Website
- Official website

Tekfen Tower is an office skyscraper located in Levent, Istanbul, Turkey. Opened in 2002, the tower stands at 118 meters tall with 28 floors.

== See also ==
- List of tallest buildings in Istanbul
- List of tallest buildings in Turkey
