= Michael Aukett =

British architect (1938–2020)

- Born: Michael Claude Aukett; July 1938; Brentford, Middlesex, England
- Died: 27 October 2020
- Occupation: Architect
- Practice: Michael Aukett Associates (now Aukett Swanke)

Michael Claude Aukett (1938–2020) was a British architect who established a successful architecture practice Michael Aukett Associates in 1972, later becoming Aukett Plc.

== Career ==
Aukett started his career in 1965 at Austin-Smith:Lord where he quickly became a partner.

In 1972 he established his own practice Michael Aukett Associates (now Aukett Swanke). The practice developed as a multi-disciplinary practice and went public in 1987. He left the practice in 1995 to start a new smaller office Michael Aukett Architects.

He retired in 2009.

=== Notable buildings ===
- Lennox Wood Computer Centre, Horsham (1984)
- Marks and Spencer Management Centre, Chester (1989)
- Procter & Gamble HQ, Weybridge (1995)
- Tesco, Sheffield (1998)

== Personal life ==
Aukett was born and grew up in Brentford Middlesex and studied architecture part time at London's Regent Street Polytechnic (now University of Westminster), completing in 1962. He had a love of sport and was a long time member of the MCC. He was married twice. Michael Claude Aukett died on 27 October 2020: his funeral, attended by both his sons and both his daughters, as well as his former wife and current wife, took place on 7 November 2020 at Poole in Dorset, England,
