= Sabancı Center =

Coordinates: 41°05′06″N 29°00′36″E

Akbank Tower
- Headquarters of Sabancı Center in Büyükdere Avenue, Istanbul

General information
- Status: Completed
- Type: Office
- Location: Levent, Istanbul, Turkey
- Opening: 1993; 33 years ago

Height
- Roof: 136 m (446 ft)

Technical details
- Floor count: 39

Design and construction
- Architects: Haluk Tümay, Ayhan Böke
- Developer: Koray Holding

Sabancı Center is an office skyscraper complex which consists of two skyscrapers located close to the Büyükdere Avenue in Beşiktaş district of Istanbul, Turkey. Current tallest skyscraper of that complex is Akbank Tower.

Name	Height m (ft)	Floors	Completed	Status
Akbank Tower	136 m (446 ft)	39	1993	Completed
Sabancı Center Tower 2	118 m (387 ft)	34	1993	Completed
Sabancı Center Tower 3	220 (722)	55		Never built

== Special features of the project ==
- 39-floor Akbank Headquarters tower
- 34-floor Sabancı Holding tower
- Conference Center have capacity up to 638 people
- Three multi-use and audio-visual meeting rooms (up to 150+70+70) separated by portable partitions
- Sabancı Holding and Akbank Headquarter towers also have 7 meeting rooms. One of the meeting rooms has video conference system
- Restaurants and cafeterias are capable of serving 2,500 people
- VIP dining rooms
- Breakfast and café service during day
- Emergency ambulance service between 07:30 - 19:00 Monday - Saturday
- Photocopy service
- Branch bank
- Dry cleaning service
- Branch post office
- Branch "Vista" travel agency office
- 440-vehicle open and 36 vehicle closed car park
- A total of 24 elevators in the towers, including two fire and eight express elevators
- A fire warning, prevention, and intervention system that is compliance with international standards
- An energy distribution system which permits flexible office set - up and design
- Electrically commanded and controlled air-conditioning, and elevators
- Electronic security and prevention systems that meet international standards
- Modern, computer-aided building management
- Centralized clock system
- Card-controlled entrance and exit system
- Sound, music, and individual location public address system
- Inter floor document delivery via pneumatic tubes
- Satellite and radio broadcasting
- Economic energy use

== Technical features of the project ==
- Construction type: Concrete
- Construction site area: 20,475 m^{2}
- Total construction area: 108,000 m^{2}
- Construction height -/+ 0.00 nominal spot height: 136 m (446 ft)
- Excavation: 250,000 m^{2}
- Pile retaining wall: 8,350 m^{2}
- Molds (neo-mold system): 250,000 m^{2}
- Reinforcing rods: 10,000 tons
- Concrete: 70,000 m^{3}
- Waterproofing: 27,000 m^{2}
- Foundations: 18,000 m^{3}
- Aluminum: 150 tons
- Glass: 25,000 m^{2}

== See also ==
- List of tallest buildings in Istanbul
