= Trump Towers Istanbul =

Mixed-use buildings in Turkey

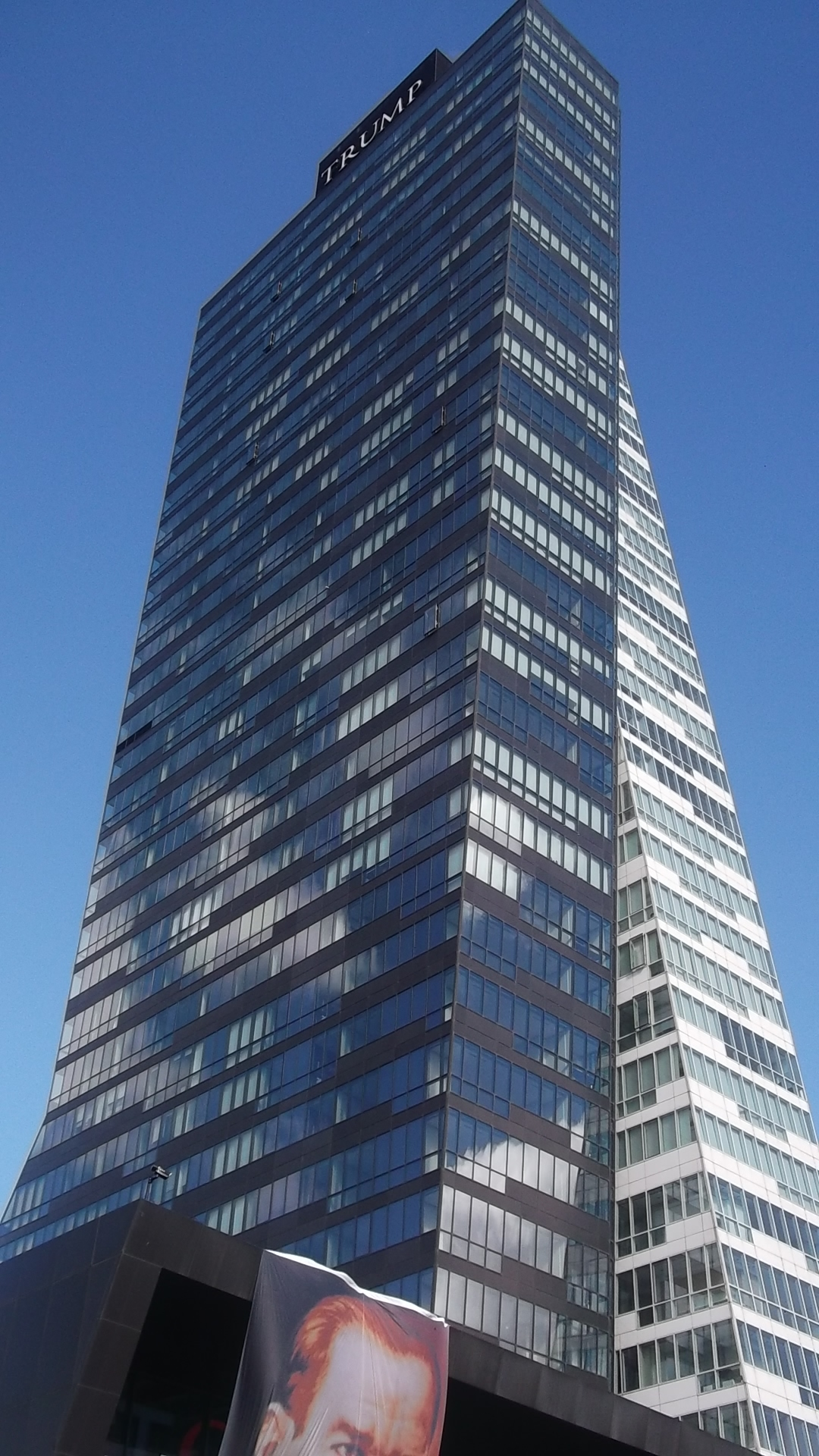
- Interactive map of the Trump Towers Istanbul area

General information
- Status: Completed
- Type: Mixed-use
- Location: Mecidiyeköy, Şişli, Istanbul, Turkey
- Coordinates: 41°4′3″N 28°59′33″E
- Opened: 2012

Height
- Roof: 155 m (509 ft) and 145 m (476 ft)

Technical details
- Floor count: 39 and 37

Design and construction
- Architect: Brigitte Weber Architectural Office
- Developer: Adi Chabli

Trump Towers Istanbul are two conjoined skyscrapers in Şişli, Istanbul, Turkey. One of the towers is an office tower, and the other a residential tower, consisting of over 200 residences. The complex also holds a shopping mall with some 80 shops and a multiplex cinema. They are the first Trump Towers built on the European continent. The property developer is Turkish billionaire Aydın Doğan, in a license-partnership with American businessman (later U.S. President) Donald Trump. His daughter Ivanka Trump took part in the promotion and sales of the residences in 2007, 2008 and 2009 and attended the April 2012 launch with her father Donald Trump and Turkish Prime Minister (later President) Recep Tayyip Erdoğan. Many businesses based in Europe and the Middle East occupy the complex, which was designed by Austrian architect Brigitte Weber.

The original license holder was Miami-based developer Adi Chabli. Chabli originally brought Trump to Turkey and held the license, prior to negotiating and subsequently transferring it to Doğan Holding.

The residential tower includes the only collective wine cellar in Turkey, the cellar being built by Focus Wine Cellars.

Among the buildings' prominent tenants is Iranian-born businessman Reza Zarrab.

== Trump name controversy ==
The Turkish owner of the building, Aydın Doğan, who pays The Trump Organization for the right to use their brand name, was reported in December 2015 to be exploring legal means to dissociate the property, following U.S. presidential candidate Trump's call to "temporarily ban Muslims from specific countries from entering the United States".

In December 2015, Trump stated in a radio interview that he had a "conflict of interest" in dealing with Turkey because of his property, saying "I have a little conflict of interest, because I have a major, major building in Istanbul ... It’s called Trump Towers. Two towers, instead of one. Not the usual one, it’s two. And I’ve gotten to know Turkey very well."

In August 2018, Aytun Çıray, general secretary of the Good Party, a major opposition party in Turkey, called on the government of President Erdoğan to "seize the Trump Towers” in protest of the Trump Administration's declaration of sanctions on Turkey's Ministers of Justice and the Interior.

== See also ==
- List of tallest buildings in Europe
- List of tallest buildings in Istanbul
- List of tallest buildings in Turkey
