= MetroCity AVM =

Shopping mall in Istanbul, Turkey

Coordinates: 41.07620°N 29.01305°E

| Location | 1. Levent, İstanbul, Turkey |
| Opening date | April 30, 2003; 23 years ago |
| Developed by | Metrosite |
| Land area (m^{2}) | 24,178 |
| Total enclosed area (m^{2}) | 52,000 |
| Gross leasable area (m^{2}) | 31,980 |
| Market (m^{2}) | Migros (4,240) |
| Number of stores | 140 |
| Number of FF/Rest/Cafe | 30 |
| Anchor tenants (m^{2}) | Boyner (6,981); Zara (1,344); Koton (1,367); Marks & Spencer (2,178); TeknoSA (1,027); Maxi Toys (1,065); Flo (1,000); Essporto (4,400) |
| Parking lot capacity | 2,500 |
| Homepage | www.metrocity.com.tr |

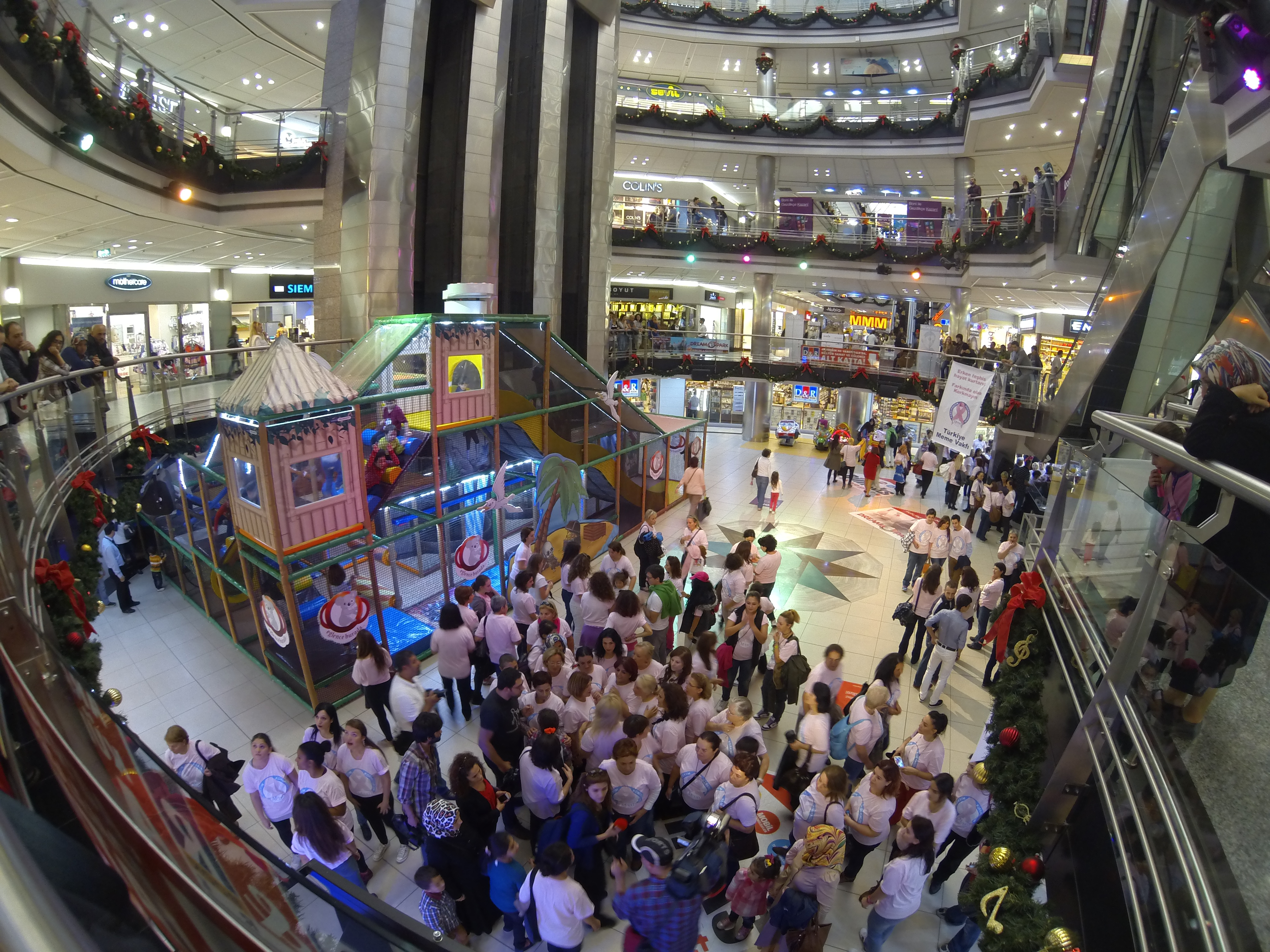
Interior view

MetroCity AVM, opened on April 30, 2003, is a modern shopping mall on the Büyükdere Avenue in the finance and business quarter of 1. Levent in Istanbul, Turkey, with a direct connection to the Levent subway station.

The complex comprises a shopping mall and three towers which rise above it: a 27-floor office tower on Büyükdere Avenue (31 floors when counted from the Zincirlikuyu level at the opposite side), and two residential towers, each having 31 floors (35 floors from Zincirlikuyu level).

== See also ==
- List of shopping malls in Istanbul
