= Tekstilkent Koza Plaza =

Coordinates: 41°04′07″N 28°51′51″E

Koza Plaza
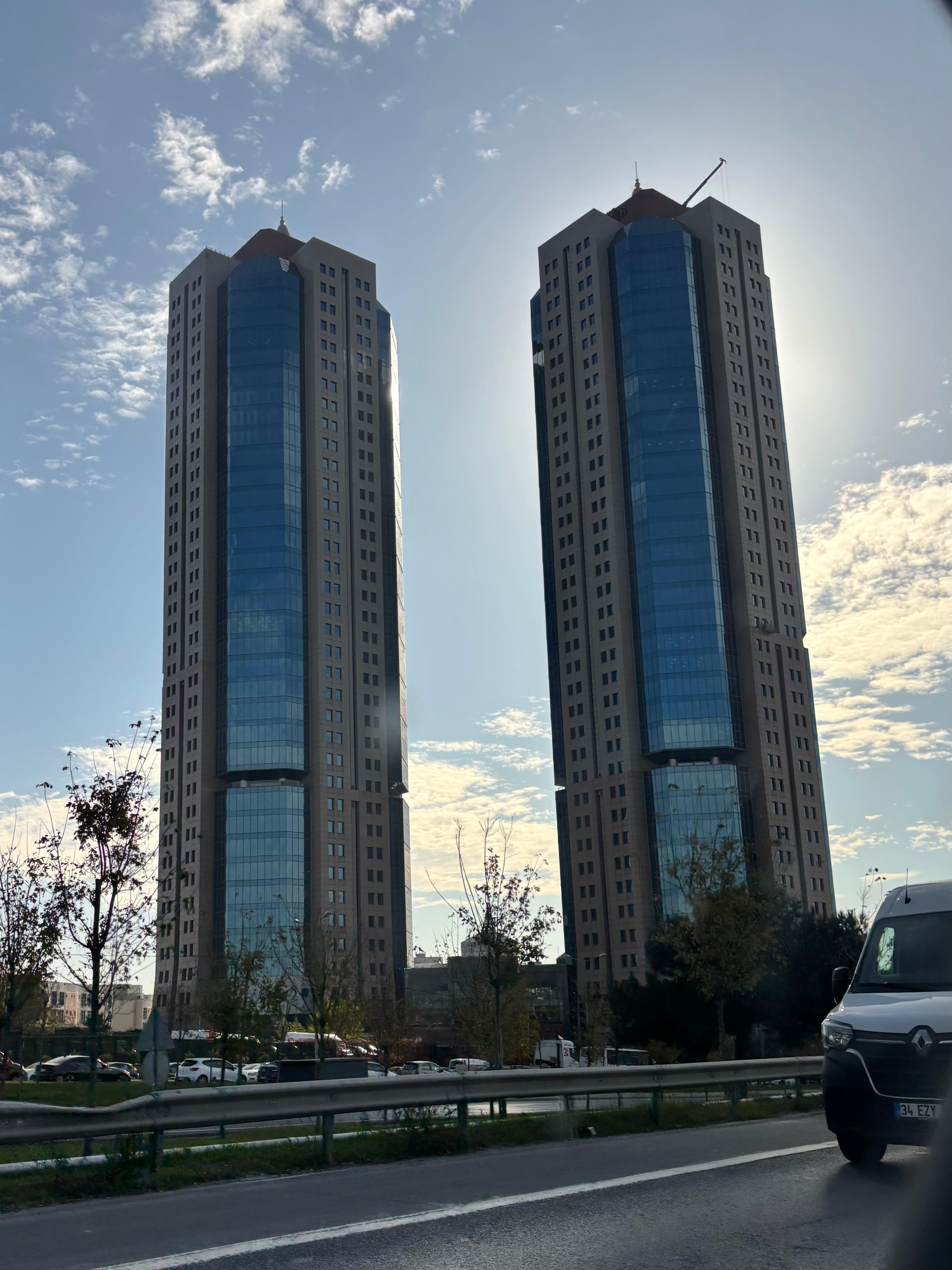
- Interactive map of the Koza Plaza area

General information
- Status: Completed
- Type: Mixed-use: Office, Hotel
- Location: Esenler, Istanbul, Turkey
- Opening: 2000
- Owner: Koza Ipek Holding

Height
- Roof: 158 m (518 ft)

Technical details
- Floor count: 44

Design and construction
- Architect: Ova Design
- Developer: Turkish Textile Producers Union, Baytur, Garanti - Balfour Beatty & Schüco International KG.

Koza Plaza also known as the Tekstilent Plaza is a mixed-use skyscraper complex located in the Tekstilkent cooperative of the Esenler district in Istanbul which is Europe's largest wholesale retail facility of textiles. The plaza, which was started to be constructed by Garanti-Koza, began operating in 2000. Both buildings consist of 44 floors. Its official name used to be Koza Plaza, but after the appointment of a trustee to Koza Ipek Holding, this usage was abandoned. It is among the tallest buildings in Turkey. It is also one of the largest textile centers in Europe.

== See also ==
- List of tallest buildings in Istanbul
- List of tallest buildings in Turkey
- List of tallest buildings in Europe
