= CBRT Tower =

Supertall skyscraper in Istanbul, Turkey

- Türkiye Cumhuriyeti Merkez Bankası Kulesi (Turkish)

General information
- Status: Completed
- Type: Office
- Location: 34760 Ümraniye, Istanbul, Turkey
- Coordinates: 41.0020°N 29.11048°E
- Construction started: 2020
- Completed: 2024

Height
- Architectural: 354 m (1,161 ft)
- Antenna spire: 354 m (1,161 ft)
- Roof: 330 m (1,080 ft)

Technical details
- Structural system: Reinforced concrete
- Floor count: 66
- Floor area: 300,000 m^{2} (3,230,000 sq ft)

Design and construction
- Architect: Vizzion Mimarlik
- Developer: Istanbul Financial Center

Other information
- Public transit: Istanbul Metro: Yenisahra; Finans Merkezi

CBRT Tower (Central Bank of the Republic of Turkey Tower) (Note: also known as the TCMB Tower, Turkish: Türkiye Cumhuriyet Merkez Bankası Kulesi) is a supertall skyscraper built in the Finanskent district of Istanbul, Turkey. Construction of the tower began in 2020 and completed in 2024. It stands at 354 m (1,161 ft) with 66 floors. Upon its completion, it became the tallest building in Istanbul and the tallest in Turkey, a record which it still holds as of November 2026, as well as the country's first-ever built supertall skyscraper.

== History ==
The tower is located in the Finanskent district of Istanbul and is part of the Istanbul Financial Center development, establishment which comprises several components designed to accommodate diverse financial activities and services. The concept of the Istanbul Financial Center emerged in the early 2000s as part of Turkey's broader economic vision to elevate its status in the global financial arena. The project gained momentum with the formal announcement by the Turkish government in 2009, signaling its commitment to transforming Istanbul into a significant financial hub. Subsequent legislative measures and substantial investments were made to advance the project.

=== Architecture ===
The design of TCMB Tower, which belongs to and houses the Central Bank of the Republic of Turkey (CBRT), was created by Vizzion Architecture's Şefik Birkiye. The tower, which embodies both local tradition and modernity, mirrors the prestigious image of the CBR. It is the tallest building in both Istanbul and Turkey, boasting a construction area of around 300,000 m^{2} (3,230,000 sq ft) and standing at 60 storeys tall. The lower levels contain a conference hall, museum, library, restaurant, sports fields, and winter gardens. The levels of the tower are designated for office spaces and meeting rooms.

The Central Bank tower was created by Turkish-Belgian architect Şefik Birkiye from Vizzion Architecture. Constructing the building at such a height presented unique technical obstacles, requiring it to be earthquake-resistant. An innovative solution was necessary since the façade was designed with natural stone cladding to exude sophistication and strength. The issue was the heavy weight of the stone at high altitudes, and the answer was provided by the Turkish firm Silkar Stone.

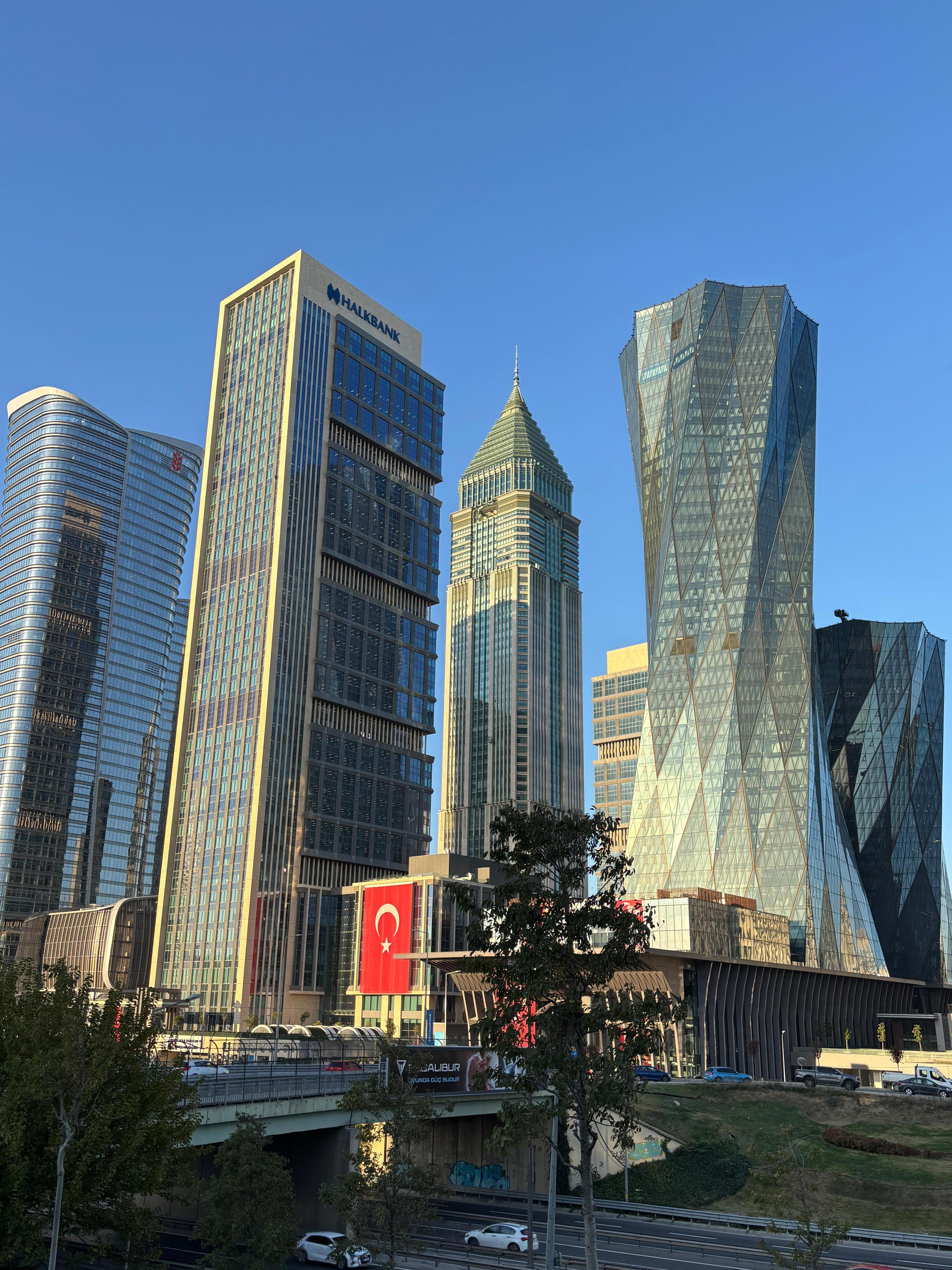
A view of Istanbul Financial Center, with the CBRT Tower in the background

Contract negotiations for the Istanbul Financial Center TCMB Phase 1 (Shell and Core) Construction Project were finalized on January 13, 2021 between Çuhadaroğlu Alüminyum Sanayi ve Ticaret A.Ş. and Limak İnşaat Sanayi ve Ticaret A.Ş., as Çuhadaroğlu was selected to provide a custom design panel system for the project's 69,690 m^{2} (750,000 sq ft) curtain wall facade, enabling the building to become Turkey's tallest at a minimum height of 320 meters.

=== Panorama ===
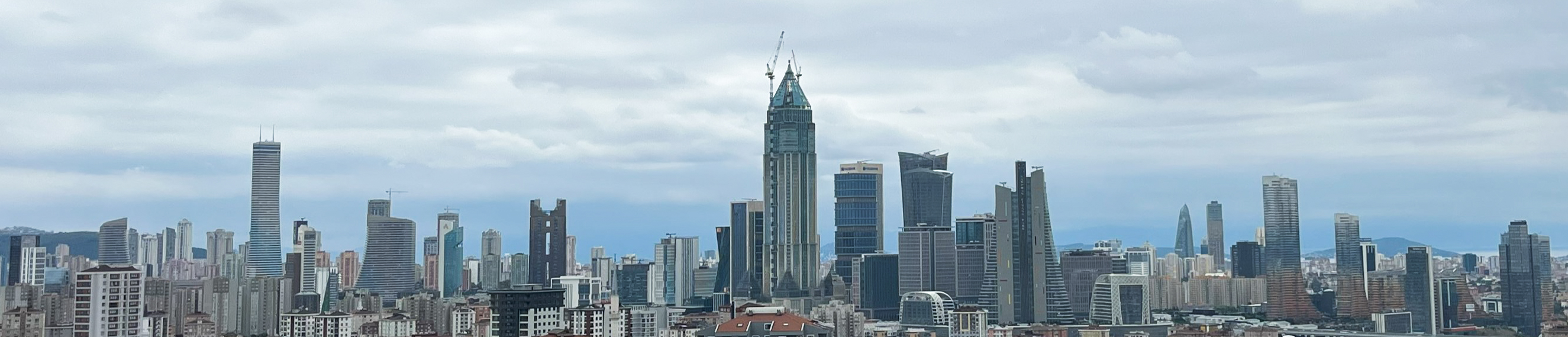
Skyline of Ataşehir on the Asian side of Istanbul, with the CBRT Tower at the center

== See also ==
- List of tallest buildings in Istanbul
- List of tallest buildings in Turkey
- List of tallest buildings in Asia

Records
Preceded by Metropol Istanbul	Tallest Building in Turkey; 2024—present 354 m	Succeeded by Incumbent
Preceded by Metropol Istanbul	Tallest Building in Istanbul; 2024—present 354 m	Succeeded by Incumbent
