= Çiftçi Towers =

Complex of mixed-use skyscrapers in the Gayrettepe neighborhood in Istanbul, Turkey

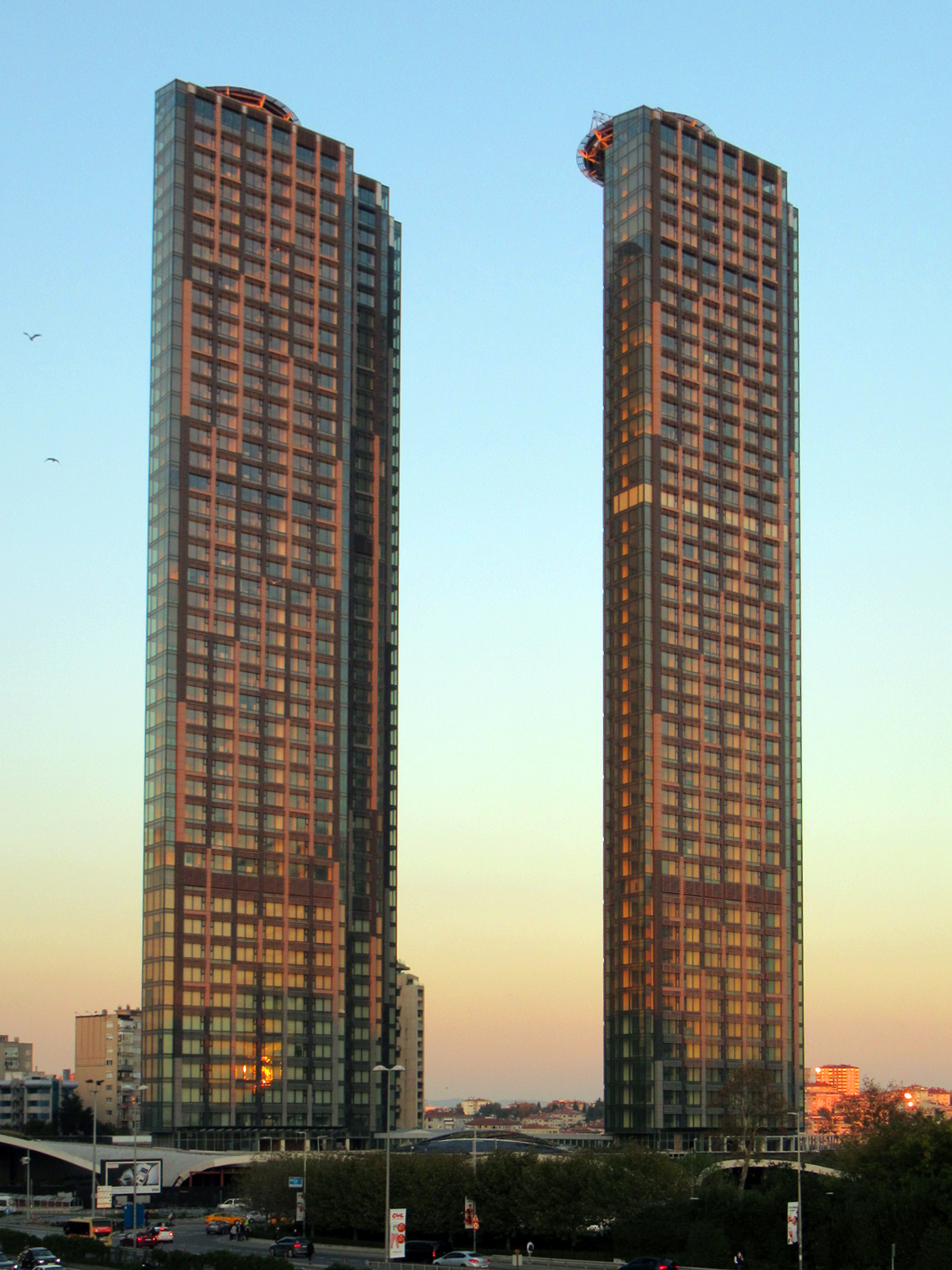
- Interactive map of the Çiftçi Towers area

General information
- Status: Completed
- Type: Residential, Commercial
- Location: Levent, Istanbul, Turkey
- Coordinates: 41.0687°N 29.0162°E
- Estimated completion: 2018

Height
- Roof: 194 m (636 ft)

Technical details
- Floor count: Çiftçi Tower A 45, Çiftçi Tower B 45

Design and construction
- Architect: John McAslan
- Developer: Çiftçiler Gayrimenkul

Other information
- Public transit: Gayrettepe

Website
- www.ciftcitowers.com.tr/en-gb/home.aspx

Çiftçi Towers is a mixed-use complex of two skyscrapers in the Gayrettepe neighborhood of the Beşiktaş district in Istanbul, Turkey. It comprises the Çiftçi Tower A (194 m / 45 floors) and Çiftçi Tower B (194 m / 45 floors). The towers are among the tallest skyscrapers on the European side of Istanbul and have a prominent visual presence on the city's skyline at the junction of Levent, Zincirlikuyu and Gayrettepe (Istanbul Metro). The buildings were designed by John McAslan of John McAslan and Partners.

== About ==
The Çiftçi Towers Project is located at the junction of Zincirlikuyu and Gayrettepe in Istanbul. The towers location atop a hill provides vast if controversial views of the Bosphorus, Beşiktaş and other surrounding areas. The two towers are situated atop a 25,000 m^{2} deck which contains a currently unfinished and vacant commercial space. Two 45-story towers sit on the deck containing 292,000 m^{2} of space. The project includes approximately 84,000 m^{2} of residences, 10,000 m^{2} of office, 68.000 m^{2} of commercial area. The project contains 2,500 indoor parking spaces in an underground parking deck. The two structures contain 296 apartments.

The project was developed by Çiftçiler Gayrimenkul, Türkerler İnşaat and engineered by Arup.

== History ==
The foundation of Çiftçi Towers was laid in 2012. Two 45-story, 180-meter tall towers were built on a 23,000 m^{2} of land between Büyükdere Street and Barbaros Boulevard in Beşiktaş. Upon inspection, employees of the Beşiktaş Municipality determined that an additional 3,000 m^{2} of usage area was created on the roofs of the two towers. Those inspectors also determined that 4 additional shops, each 350 m^{2} in size were built in the garden area at ground level. As a result of this dispute and other zoning violations, the municipality put a stop work order on the project.

The developer of the project applied to the Ministry of Environment and Urbanization as part of a zoning amnesty. Per the zoning peace arrangement, a demolition order for the extra portions of the building was canceled. The delay in project delivery created a new set of lawsuits between individuals who bought apartments and the developer citing delays and demands for refunds. The removal of the stop order work allowed for the project to reach a stage of substantial completion.

The project was not only weighed down by zoning violations and lawsuits from buyers but also among the heirs of the developer. After the death of Tahsin Çiftçi, the founder of the development group, in 2000, a protracted legal process began among his heirs. Various foreclosure and enforcement lawsuits were also filed for real estates such as Ragıp Paşa Mansion, villas in Yeniköy and Polat Çiftçi Tower in Şişli. The ongoing lawsuits have prevented the completion of the project leading to legal issues with lenders.

The nearly completed project was put up for sale in April 2022. The project was put up for sale at the request of creditors. It remains unsold as of 2024.

== See also ==
- List of tallest buildings in Istanbul
- List of tallest buildings in Turkey
