= Emaar Square Istanbul =

Skyscraper complex in Istanbul, Turkey

- Emaar Meydanı Istanbul (Turkish)
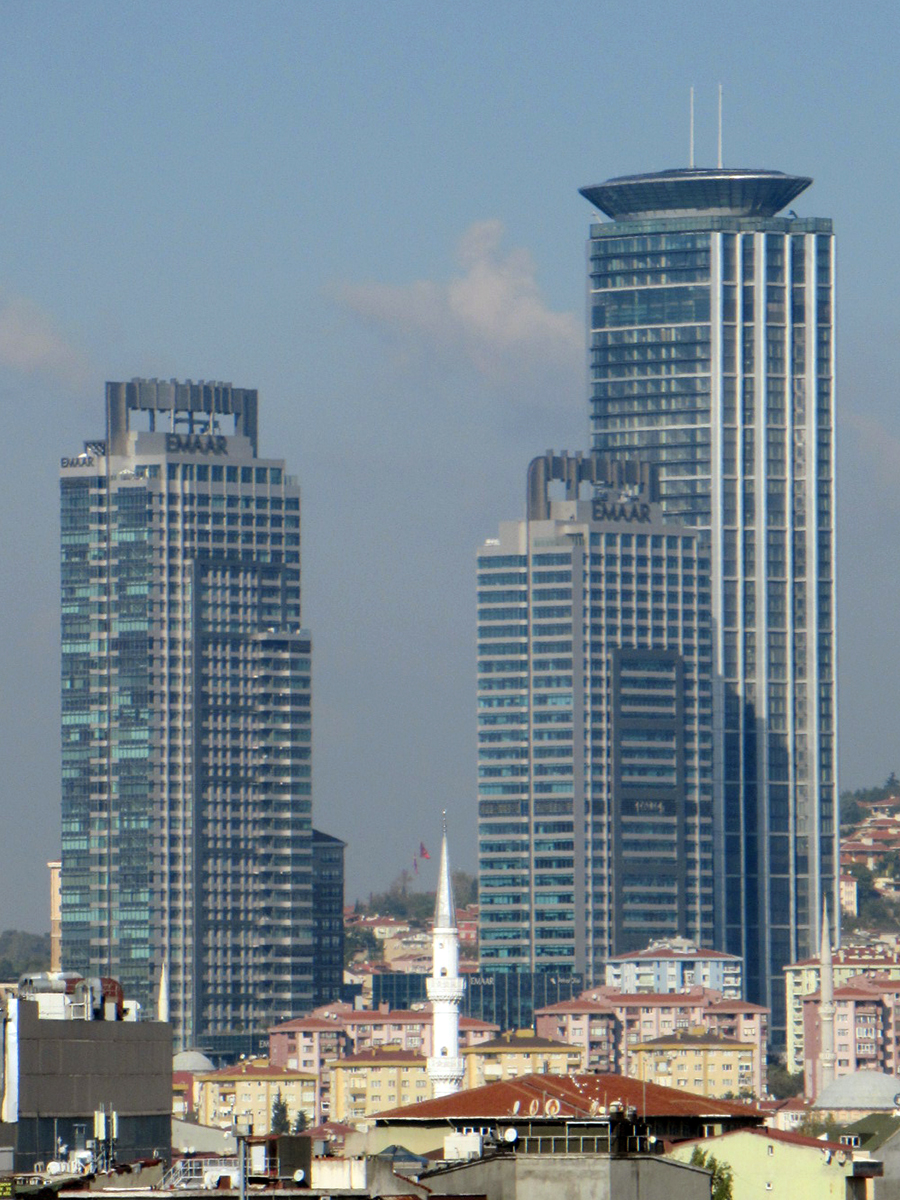
- Emaar Square The Address Hotel & Residences
- Interactive map of the Emaar Square Istanbul area

General information
- Status: Completed
- Type: Mixed-use: Office, Hotel, Residential, Retail
- Location: Istanbul, Turkey, Ünalan, Libadiye Cd. No: 80 G Blok, 34700 Üsküdar/Istanbul, Turkey
- Coordinates: 41.00432°N 29.07118°E
- Construction started: 2012
- Completed: 2020

Height
- Antenna spire: 245 m (804 ft) (Address Hotel, tallest)
- Roof: 218 m (715 ft) (Address Hotel, tallest)

Technical details
- Structural system: Reinforced concrete
- Floor count: 51 (Address Hotel)
- Floor area: 95,000 m^{2} (1,020,000 sq ft) (Address Hotel)
- Lifts/elevators: Otis Worldwide; J. Roger Preston Limited

Design and construction
- Architect: Foster + Partners
- Developer: Emaar Properties
- Structural engineer: Erdemlı Proje
- Main contractor: TAV Construction

Website
- Address Residence

The Emaar Square Complex is a mixed-use skyscraper complex in the Ünalan district of Istanbul, Turkey. Overall built between 2012 and 2020, the complex consists of seven towers, with the tallest one (the Emaar Square The Address Hotel & Residences) standing at 245 m (804 ft) tall with 51 floors, which is the current 6th tallest building in Istanbul.

== History ==
=== Architecture ===
Situated in the city center of Istanbul, Emaar Square is Emaar's second combined project in Turkey. The initial Tuscan Valley homes project has been completed and is now a flourishing neighborhood, including the Tuscan Shopping Arcade and the Dolce Vita Club. The Address Hotel houses a total of 182 rentable rooms and a skyview top restaurant. The first 11 levels of the total of 51 are dedicated to the hotel function, with the remaining floors set aside for 320 high-end residences.

Emaar Square consists of more than 1,000 high-end residences and 40,000 square meters of office space, hosting approximately 5,000 professionals as well as The Emaar Square Shopping Mall, one of the biggest malls in the nation. It also offers various leisure options, such as entertainment centers, an ice rink, a large movie theater, and an underwater zoo, inspired by The Dubai Mall, a major retail location owned by Emaar.

The Address Hotel building has earned LEED Gold Certification by implementing significant environmentally friendly and green projects that prioritize both environmental sustainability and guest health. Carbon emissions are decreased by underground parking lots, charging stations for electric vehicles, and designated parking spots for low-emission vehicles.

== Buildings ==
| Name | Image | Height m (ft) | Floors | Opened | Function | Ref |
|---|---|---|---|---|---|---|
| Address Hotel & Residences | | 245–218 m (804–715 ft) | 51 | 2020 | Hotel | |
| Heights Residences | | 164 m (538 ft) | 34 | 2017 | Residential | |
| Office Tower | | 146 m (479 ft) | 30 | 2017 | Retail/Office | |
| Residences A | | 70 m (230 ft) | 14 | 2017 | Retail/Residential | |
| Residences B | | 70 m (230 ft) | 15 | 2017 | Retail/Residential | |
| Residences C | | 62 m (203 ft) | 14 | 2017 | Residential | |
| Residences D | | 54 m (177 ft) | 15 | 2017 | Retail/Residential | |

== See also ==
- List of tallest buildings in Istanbul
- List of tallest buildings in Turkey
