= Şişli Plaza =

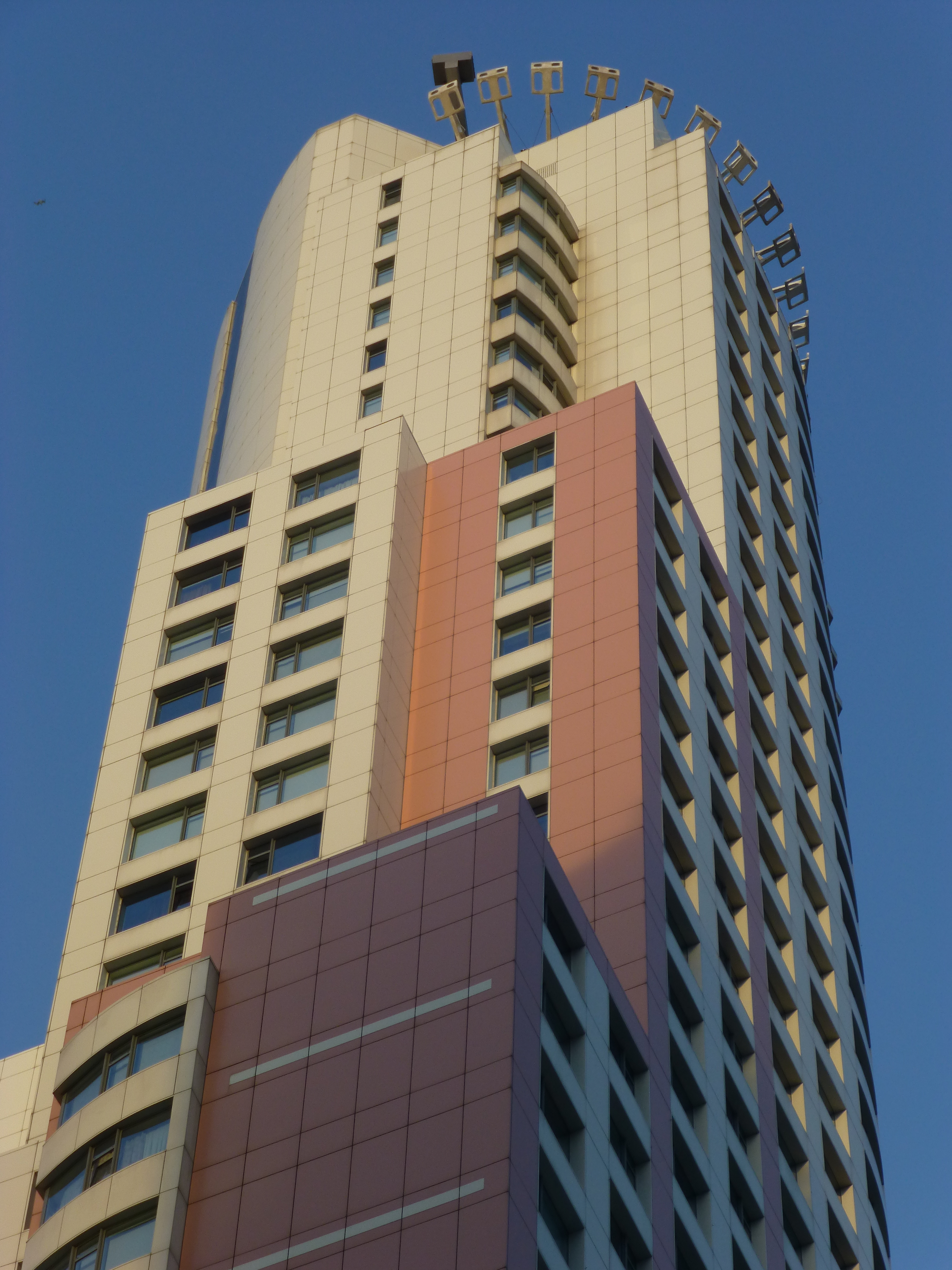
- Interactive map of the Şişli Plaza area

General information
- Status: Completed
- Type: Mixed-Use
- Location: 19 Mayıs Caddesi Şişli, Istanbul, Turkey
- Coordinates: 41.060436°N 28.991252°E
- Estimated completion: 2007

Height
- Roof: 170.1 m (558 ft)

Technical details
- Floor count: 46

Design and construction
- Developer: Yapı Merkezi Construction Company

Şişli Plaza is a mixed-use skyscraper in Istanbul, Turkey and has 40 residential floors, but rises above a 4-floor retail facility and has a 2-floor radio station on top; making an overall total of 46 floors above ground. - The floor-to-floor heights of the residential flats are 3.50 metres, while those of the retail facility are 4.00 metres. The radio station floors on top are higher than the standard residential floors. - The Şişli Plaza project, which is built on 15,484 m^{2} (166,670 sq ft) land and has an interior area of 103,403 m^{2} (1,113,020 sq ft) consists of three residential blocks. Blocks A and C have 9 floors, while block B (the residential tower) has 46 floors.

== See also ==
- Istanbul
- List of tallest buildings in Istanbul
- List of tallest buildings in Turkey
- List of tallest buildings in Europe
