= Mall of Istanbul =

Mall of İstanbul
- Location: İkitelli OSB, Süleyman Demirel Blv No:7, Başakşehir, Istanbul
- Coordinates: 41.0625272°N 28.8049507°E
- Opened: April 2014; 12 years ago
- Num. of stores: ca. 500 plus amusement, cinemas, gourmet/food, hotel, museum, and sports and recreation facilities
- Num. of anchor tenants: ca. 10 retail anchors
- Floor area: 170,000 square metres (1,800,000 sq ft) (retail)
- Floors: 4 (retail), 1 (parking)
- Public transit: MASKO station of M9 line

The Mall of İstanbul (with a dotted capital I, the Turkish spelling of the word İstanbul; abbreviated form MOİ) is a 3,800,000 sq ft (350,000 m^{2}) mixed-use development in the Başakşehir district of Istanbul, centered around one of Turkey's largest shopping malls with 154,000 m^{2} (1,660,000 sq ft) of gross leasable area.

The complex includes office spaces, a 175-room Hilton Hotel that opened in 2020, an IMAX theater within a fifteen-screen cinema, and a 700-seat theater known as MOİ Sahne. Other facilities comprise an amusement park (MOİPark), a nature park, a gourmet center, terraced gardens, swimming pools, a club and spa, sports fields, and WOX Turkey, an illusion and toy museum.

The complex opened in April 2014, featuring approximately 350 retail stores. Notable developments in Turkish retail at the site included the introduction of the first two-story LC Waikiki, the first H&M Home store in the country, the first full-line Victoria's Secret store in Turkey, and the second Debenhams store in the nation, following its initial location at Istanbul Cevahir. Both Debenhams locations ceased operations in 2017.

As of June 2024, the retail anchors and larger tenants at the complex include prominent brands such as Armani Exchange, Beymen Club, Brooks Brothers, Calvin Klein, Gant, Guess, Harry Potter Store, Lacoste, Massimo Dutti, Mango, Sephora, Swarovski, Tommy Hilfiger, Vakko Boutique, Boyner, Decathlon, DeFacto, H&M, Koçtaş, Koton, LC Waikiki, Marks & Spencer, MediaMarkt, 5M Migros and TeknoSA.

Mall of Istanbul also includes a range of restaurant and coffee brands representing both international chains and Turkish companies. Food and beverage outlets in the mall include restaurants such as Shake Shack, Big Chefs, Sushi&Spice, Tahin Restoran, Arby's, KFC, Popeyes, Burger King and HuQQabaz, as well as coffee and café brands including Starbucks, Caffè Nero, Gloria Jean's Coffees, Espressolab, Simit Sarayı, Kahve Dünyası, Tchibo, Nespresso, and Özsüt. These establishments are distributed across the mall’s dining and café areas and primarily serve casual dining, coffee, and dessert offerings.

== Awards ==
In 2017, the Mall of Istanbul received the "VIVA (Vision, Innovation, Value, Achievement) Best-of-the-Best" award for sustainability from the International Council of Shopping Centers. The recognition was attributed to several factors, including its status as a LEED Gold Certified building, the use of skylight roofing, the implementation of a greywater drainage system, a 90% usage rate of LED lighting, and the presence of five atriums designed to maximize natural light.
