= List of tallest buildings in Turkey =

This list of the tallest buildings in Turkey ranks buildings in Turkey by height.

== Tallest skyscrapers in Turkey ==
List of completed highest buildings of Turkey including spires, architectural details, antennas and flagpoles.

Was the tallest building in Turkey upon completion

| Rank | Name | Image | City | Height m (ft) | Floors | Year | Notes References |
|---|---|---|---|---|---|---|---|
| 1 | IFC CBRT Tower | | İstanbul | 354–330 m (1,161–1,083 ft) | 62 | 2024 | Tallest building in Istanbul and Turkey |
| 2 | Metropol Istanbul Tower | | İstanbul | 301–280 m (988–919 ft) | 70 | 2017 | |
| 3-4 | Skyland İstanbul | | İstanbul | 284 m (932 ft) | 65 | 2017 | |
| 5 | Istanbul Sapphire | | İstanbul | 261–236 m (856–774 ft) | 54 | 2010 | |
| 6 | Emaar Square The Address Hotel & Residences | | İstanbul | 245–218 m (804–715 ft) | 50 | 2020 | |
| 7 | Mahall Bomonti | | İzmir | 242 m (794 ft) | 60 | 2024 | Tallest building in İzmir |
| 8 | Nurol Life | | İstanbul | 220 m (720 ft) | 50 | 2018 | |
| 9 | Istanbul Tower 205 | | İstanbul | 220 m (720 ft) | 54 | 2019 | |
| 10 | Istanbul International Finance Center Ziraat Tower 1 | | İstanbul | 219 m (719 ft) | 46 | 2022 | |
| 11 | Mistral Office Tower | | İzmir | 216 m (709 ft) | 48 | 2017 | |
| 12 | Maslak Spine Tower | | İstanbul | 211–202 m (692–663 ft) | 51 | 2013 | |
| 13 | Royal Tower | | Ankara | 210 m (690 ft) | 47 | 2022 | Tallest building in Ankara |
| 14 | Istanbul International Finance Center Halkbank Tower 1 | | İstanbul | 208 m (682 ft) | 45 | 2023 | |
| 15-16 | Folkart Towers | | İzmir | 200 m (660 ft) | 47 | 2014 | |
| 17 | Queen Central Park Bomonti | | İstanbul | 195 m (640 ft) | 56 | 2018 | |
| 18-19 | Anthill Residences | | İstanbul | 195 m (640 ft) | 54 | 2010 | |
| 20 | Akasya Kent Tower | | İstanbul | 195 m (640 ft) | 40 | 2014 | |
| 21 | Vakıf Bank Headquarters Tower 1 | | İstanbul | 194 m (636 ft) | 43 | 2023 | |
| 22-23 | Çiftçi Towers | | İstanbul | 194 m (636 ft) | 45 | 2018 | |
| 24 | Istanbul International Finance Center Ziraat Tower 2 | | İstanbul | 194 m (636 ft) | 40 | 2023 | |
| 25 | Türk Telekom Tower | | Ankara | 192–150 m (630–492 ft) | 36 | 2015 | |
| 26 | Asce Zenith | | Ankara | 187 m (614 ft) | 55 | 2025 | |
| 27 | Ege Perla Residence | | İzmir | 186 m (610 ft) | 46 | 2016 | |
| 28 | Kuzu Effect | | Ankara | 186 m (610 ft) | 46 | 2018 | |
| 29 | Rönesans Tower (Allianz Tower) | | İstanbul | 186 m (610 ft) | 40 | 2013 | |
| 30 | Varyap Meridian Grand Tower 1 | | İstanbul | 184 m (604 ft) | 57 | 2013 | |
| 31 | İşbank Tower 1 | | İstanbul | 181 m (594 ft) | 52 | 2000 | |
| 32 | Palladium Tower | | İstanbul | 180 m (590 ft) | 43 | 2011 | |
| 33 | Sarphan Finans Park | | İstanbul | 178 m (584 ft) | 48 | 2014 | |
| 34 | Rams Beyond-Etro Residences | | İstanbul | 178 m (584 ft) | 44 | 2026 | |
| 35 | Elmar Towers | | Ankara | 177 m (581 ft) | 50 | 2017 | |
| 36 | Ataşehir Modern Arya Block | | İstanbul | 177 m (581 ft) | 43 | 2024 | |
| 37 | Mertim | | Mersin | 176.8 m (580 ft) | 52 | 1992 | Tallest building in Mersin |
| 38 | Andromeda Gold | | İstanbul | 170 m (560 ft) | 52 | 2013 | |
| 39 | Levent 199 | | İstanbul | 170 m (560 ft) | 40 | 2014 | |
| 40 | Mandarin Oriental Etiler T1 | | İstanbul | 170 m (560 ft) | 40 | 2026 | |
| 41 | Gümüş Panorama | | İstanbul | 170 m (560 ft) | 40 | 2021 | |
| 42 | Soyak Kristal Kule | | İstanbul | 169 m (554 ft) | 40 | 2014 | |
| 43 | Maya Anatolium Tower | | İstanbul | 168 m (551 ft) | 37 | 2018 | |
| 44 | Point Bornova | | İzmir | 168 m (551 ft) | 50 | 2018 | |
| 45-46 | 42 Maslak | | İstanbul | 167 m (548 ft) | 42 | 2014 | |
| 47 | Istanbloom | | İstanbul | 167 m (548 ft) | 44 | 2013 | |
| 48 | YDA Center | | Ankara | 166 m (545 ft) | 37 | 2019 | |
| 49-50 | Selenium Twins | | İstanbul | 165–138 m (541–453 ft) | 34 | 2008 | |
| 51 | Emaar Square Heights | | İstanbul | 164 m (538 ft) | 34 | 2018 | |
| 52 | Seljuk Tower | | Konya | 163 m (535 ft) | 42 | 2006 | Tallest building in Konya |
| 53 | Iconova R Block | | Gaziantep | 162 m (531 ft) | 43 | 2018 | Tallest building in Gaziantep |
| 54 | Metafor Ankara | | Ankara | 162 m (531 ft) | 40 | 2024 | |
| 55 | One Tower | | Ankara | 161 m (528 ft) | 38 | 2016 | |
| 56 | Portakal Çiçeği Tower | | Ankara | 160 m (520 ft) | 37 | 2011 | |
| 57 | Exen Plaza | | İstanbul | 160 m (520 ft) | 42 | 2010 | |
| 58-60 | Torun Center | | İstanbul | 160 m (520 ft) | 42 | 2017 | |
| 61 | Nurol Tower | | İstanbul | 160 m (520 ft) | 40 | 2014 | |
| 62-63 | Quasar Istanbul | | İstanbul | 160 m (520 ft) | 40 | 2014 | |
| 64 | Divan Residence Bomonti | | İstanbul | 159 m (522 ft) | 43 | 2010 | |
| 65-66 | Tekstilkent Koza Plaza | | İstanbul | 158 m (518 ft) | 44 | 2000 | |
| 67 | Rotana Residences Bomonti | | İstanbul | 157 m (515 ft) | 44 | 2021 | |
| 68 | River Plaza | | İstanbul | 156 m (512 ft) | 38 | 2014 | |
| 69 | Istanbul International Finance Center Halkbank Tower 2 | | İstanbul | 156 m (512 ft) | 34 | 2023 | |
| 70 | Trump Towers Istanbul 1 | | İstanbul | 156 m (512 ft) | 39 | 2010 | |
| 71-74 | Four Winds | | İstanbul | 156 m (512 ft) | 49 | 2013 | |
| 75-77 | Maslak 1453 A1-A2-A4 | | İstanbul | 156 m (512 ft) | 55 | 2017 | |
| 78 | İnci Smyrna | | İzmir | 155 m (509 ft) | 48 | 2026 | |
| 79 | Skyland Deluxe Residence | | İstanbul | 155 m (509 ft) | 28 | 2018 | |
| 80 | Terrace Tema | | İstanbul | 155–145 m (509–476 ft) | 39 | 2014 | |
| 81 | Manzara Adalar A Block | | İstanbul | 155 m (509 ft) | 40 | 2015 | |
| 82 | Mistral Residence Tower | | İzmir | 154 m (505 ft) | 38 | 2016 | |
| 83 | Akasya Koru Tower | | İstanbul | 153 m (502 ft) | 44 | 2014 | |
| 84 | Şişli Plaza | | İstanbul | 152 m (499 ft) | 46 | 2007 | |
| 85 | Ikon Tower | | İzmir | 152 m (499 ft) | 39 | 2018 | |
| 86 | Biva Tower | | İzmir | 151 m (495 ft) | 33 | 2022 | |
| 87 | Vega Park Towers | | Ankara | 151 m (495 ft) | 46 | 2013 | |
| 88 | Sembol Istanbul A Block | | İstanbul | 151 m (495 ft) | 45 | 2017 | |
| 89 | Torun (Denizbank) Tower | | İstanbul | 150 m (490 ft) | 35 | 2014 | |
| 90-91 | Moment Istanbul | | İstanbul | 150 m (490 ft) | 44 | 2018 | |
| 92 | Sheraton Residence Esenyurt | | İstanbul | 150 m (490 ft) | 40 | 2013 | |
| 93 | İncek Prestij | | Ankara | 150 m (490 ft) | 45 | 2016 | |
| 94 | Regnum Sky Tower | | Ankara | 150 m (490 ft) | 35 | 2016 | |
| 95-96 | Merkez Ankara Office Towers 1–2 | | Ankara | 150 m (490 ft) | 35 | 2026 | |
| 97 | Aris Grand Tower | | İstanbul | 150 m (490 ft) | 42 | 2018 | |
| 98 | Bulvar İstanbul Residence | | İstanbul | 150 m (490 ft) | 37 | 2017 | |
| 99 | Terrace Lotus | | İstanbul | 150 m (490 ft) | 42 | 2025 | |
| 100-101 | Metropol Istanbul Tower B-C | | İstanbul | 150 m (490 ft) | 36 | 2017 | |
| 102-103 | Mandarin Oriental Etiler T2-T3 | | İstanbul | 150 m (490 ft) | 35 | 2026 | |
| 104 | ISTMarina 2 | | İstanbul | 150 m (490 ft) | 43 | 2018 | |

== Tallest skyscrapers by province ==
| Name | Image | City | Height m (ft) | Floors | Year |
|---|---|---|---|---|---|
| CBRT Tower | | Istanbul | 354 m (1,161 ft) | 62 | 2024 |
| Royal Tower | | Ankara | 210 m (690 ft) | 47 | 2022 |
| Mahall Bomonti | | Izmir | 242 m (794 ft) | 60 | 2024 |
| Mertim | | Mersin | 176.8 m (580 ft) | 52 | 1992 |
| Seljuk Tower | | Konya | 163 m (535 ft) | 42 | 2006 |
| Iconova R Block | | Gaziantep | 162 m (531 ft) | 43 | 2019 |
| Central Balat | | Bursa | 140–130 m (460–430 ft) | 40 | 2021 |
| Sheraton Grand Samsun | | Samsun | 115 m (377 ft) | 28 | 2015 |
| Adana Kule Residence | | Adana | 110–105 m (361–344 ft) | 33 | 2019 |
| Diamond Towers | | Şanlıurfa | 102 m (335 ft) | 22 | 2023 |
| ESN Twin Towers | | Elazığ | 100–90 m (330–300 ft) | 29 | 2017 |
| Sinpaş Aquacity Towers | | Denizli | 100–90 m (330–300 ft) | 29 | 2018-2023 |
| Park Forbes & Hilton Towers | | İskenderun | 87 m (285 ft) | 21 | 2016 |
| A Plus Seyran Konutları | | Diyarbakır | 85 m (279 ft) | 26 | 2015 |
| Canbakkal Tower | | Trabzon | 85 m (279 ft) | 26 | 2017 |
| Gebze Emlak Konutları 3. Etap A6 | | Kocaeli | 83 m (272 ft) | 26 | 2020 |
| Pınarlar Residences | | Antalya | 82 m (269 ft) | 22 | 2000 |
| Triovista Mansions | | Afyonkarahisar | 80 m (260 ft) | 21 | 2023 |
| DoubleTree by Hilton Manisa | | Manisa | 80–70 m (260–230 ft) | 20 | 2022 |
| Radisson Blu Hotel | | Kayseri | 75 m (246 ft) | 22 | 2014 |
| Hilton Garden Hotel | | Sivas | 60 m (200 ft) | 15 | 2016 |

== Number of Skyscrapers by Turkish Cities ==
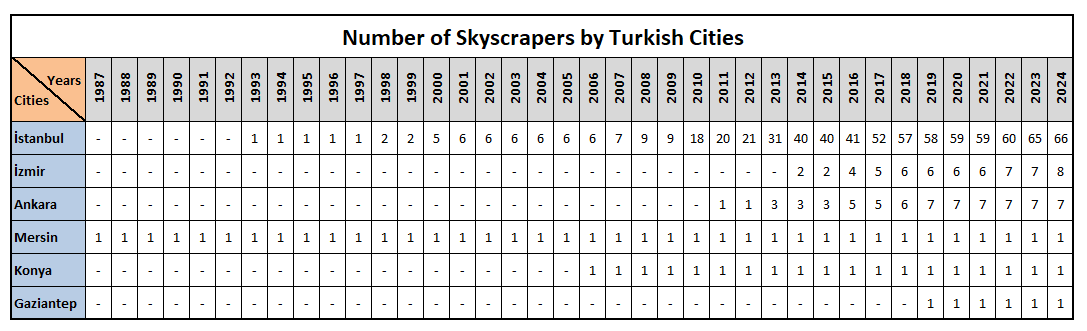

== Cities with buildings over 100 meters ==
| City | ≥300 m | 299–250 m | 249–200 m | 199–150 m | 149–100 m |
|---|---|---|---|---|---|
| Istanbul | 1 | 4 | 7 | 58 | 140 |
| Ankara | – | – | 2 | 13 | 60 |
| İzmir | – | – | 5 | 4 | 27 |
| Mersin | – | – | – | 1 | 6 |
| Gaziantep | – | – | – | 1 | 6 |
| Konya | – | – | – | 1 | 1 |
| Samsun | – | – | – | - | 4 |
| Bursa | – | – | – | - | 1 |

== Buildings under construction and preparation ==
| Rank | Name | Height (m) (ft) | Floors | City | Scheduled Completion |
|---|---|---|---|---|---|
| 1 | İnci Mega | 240–280 m (787–919 ft) (?) | 63 | İzmir | 2030 |
| 2 | V Yenikonak A | 180–200 m (591–656 ft) (?) | 51 | İzmir | 2029 |
| 3 | Folkart Orion Hotel | 185 m (607 ft) | 50 | İzmir | 2028 |
| 4 | ETRO Residences İstanbul - Rams Beyond | 178 m (584 ft) | 44 | İstanbul | 2026 |
| 5 | Divan Residence | 173 m (568 ft) | 50 | İzmir | 2027 |
| 6 | Mandarin Oriental Etiler Hotel | 170 m (558 ft) | 40 | İstanbul | 2027 |
| 7 | Folkart Orion Office | 165 m (541 ft) (?) | 40 | İzmir | 2028 |
| 8 | İnci Smyrna | 165 m (541 ft) (?) | 47 | İzmir | 2026 |
| 9 | Folkart Orion Residences | 162.7 m (534 ft) | 44 | İzmir | 2027 |
| 10 | Folkart Orion Residences | 162.7 m (534 ft) | 44 | İzmir | 2027 |
| 11 | Teras 35 C | 161 m (528 ft) | 40 | İzmir | 2029 |
| 12 | The Residences at Mandarin Oriental Etiler | 150 m (492 ft) | 35 | İstanbul | 2027 |
| 13 | The Residences at Mandarin Oriental Etiler | 150 m (492 ft) | 35 | İstanbul | 2027 |
| 14 | İnci Smyrna | 150 m (492 ft) | 38 | İstanbul | 2026 |
| 15 | Viven Tower | 140 m (459 ft) | 38 | İzmir | On Hold |
| 16 | Riva Yalı A | 145 m (476 ft) (?) | 37 | İzmir | 2029 |
| 17 | Taşyapı Şişli | 144 m (472 ft) | 37 | İstanbul | 2028 |
| 18 | Taşyapı Şişli | 144 m (472 ft) | 37 | İstanbul | 2028 |
| 19 | Taşyapı Şişli | 144 m (472 ft) | 37 | İstanbul | 2028 |
| 20 | Taşyapı Şişli | 144 m (472 ft) | 37 | İstanbul | 2028 |
| 21 | Phantom Residence | 140 m (459 ft) (?) | 42 | İstanbul | ? |
| 22 | Riva Yalı B | 140 m (459 ft) (?) | 35 | İzmir | 2029 |
| 23 | İnci Center | 130–125 m (427–410 ft) (?) | 36 | İzmir | 2028 |
| 24 | Taşyapı Kaptanpaşa Office | 139 m (456 ft) | 34 | İstanbul | Prep |
| 25 | Teras 35 D | 128 m (420 ft) | 31 | İzmir | 2029 |
| 26 | Adozer Plaza | 128 m (420 ft) | 33 | İstanbul | Prep |
| 27 | Velux Bay Towers 1 | 123 m (404 ft) (?) | 36 | İzmir | 2027 |
| 28 | V Yenikonak B | 120–100 m (394–328 ft) (?) | 28 | İzmir | 2029 |
| 29 | Avrupa Residence Oryapark I | 120 m (394 ft) | 35 | İstanbul | 2026 |
| 30 | Taşyapı Kaptanpaşa Residence | 111 m (364 ft) | 27 | İstanbul | Prep |
| 31 | Bronz Kule | 110 m (361 ft) | 28 | İzmir | 2027 |
| 32 | Riva Yalı C | 110 m (361 ft) (?) | 32 | İzmir | 2029 |
| 33 | Folkart Orion Hospital | 110–100 m (361–328 ft) (?) | 28 | İzmir | 2028 |
| 34 | AC Hotels Marriott Şişli | 106 m (348 ft) | 28 | İstanbul | Prep |
| 35 | Prime Tower Maslak | 105 m (344 ft) | 25 | İstanbul | Prep |
| 36 | Prime Tower Maslak | 105 m (344 ft) | 25 | İstanbul | Prep |
| 37 | Prime Tower Maslak | 105 m (344 ft) | 25 | İstanbul | Prep |
| 38 | Velux Bay Towers 2 | 103 m (338 ft) | 30 | İzmir | 2027 |
| 39 | Azur Office | 100 m (328 ft) | 26 | İzmir | 2028 |

== Timeline of tallest buildings in Turkey ==
| City | Image | Name | Height meters | Height feet | Floors | Year |
|---|---|---|---|---|---|---|
| Kızılay Emek Business Center | | Ankara | 70 | 230 | 24 | 1962–1974 |
| Harbiye Military Headquarters | | Istanbul | 84 | 276 | 25 | 1974-1975 |
| BDDK - Banking Regulation & Supervision Council | | Ankara | 91 | 299 | 29 | 1975–1975 |
| InterContinental Istanbul | | Istanbul | 93 | 305 | 25 | 1975–1987 |
| Mersin Metropol (Mertim) | | Mersin | 176.8 | 580 | 52 | 1987–2000 |
| Isbank Tower 1 | | Istanbul | 181 | 594 | 52 | 2000–2009 |
| Sapphire of Istanbul | | Istanbul | 236-261 | 856 | 54 | 2009–2018 |
| Skyland Istanbul | | Istanbul | 284 | 932 | 65 | 2017-2018 |
| Metropol Istanbul | | Istanbul | 280-301 | 988 | 70 | 2018-2024 |
| CBRT Tower | | Istanbul | 330-354 | 1161 | 62 | 2024–present |

== See also ==
- List of tallest structures in Turkey
- List of tallest buildings in Asia
- List of tallest buildings in Europe
