= Istanbul Financial Center =

Coordinates: 41°0′4.77″N 29°6′36.45″E

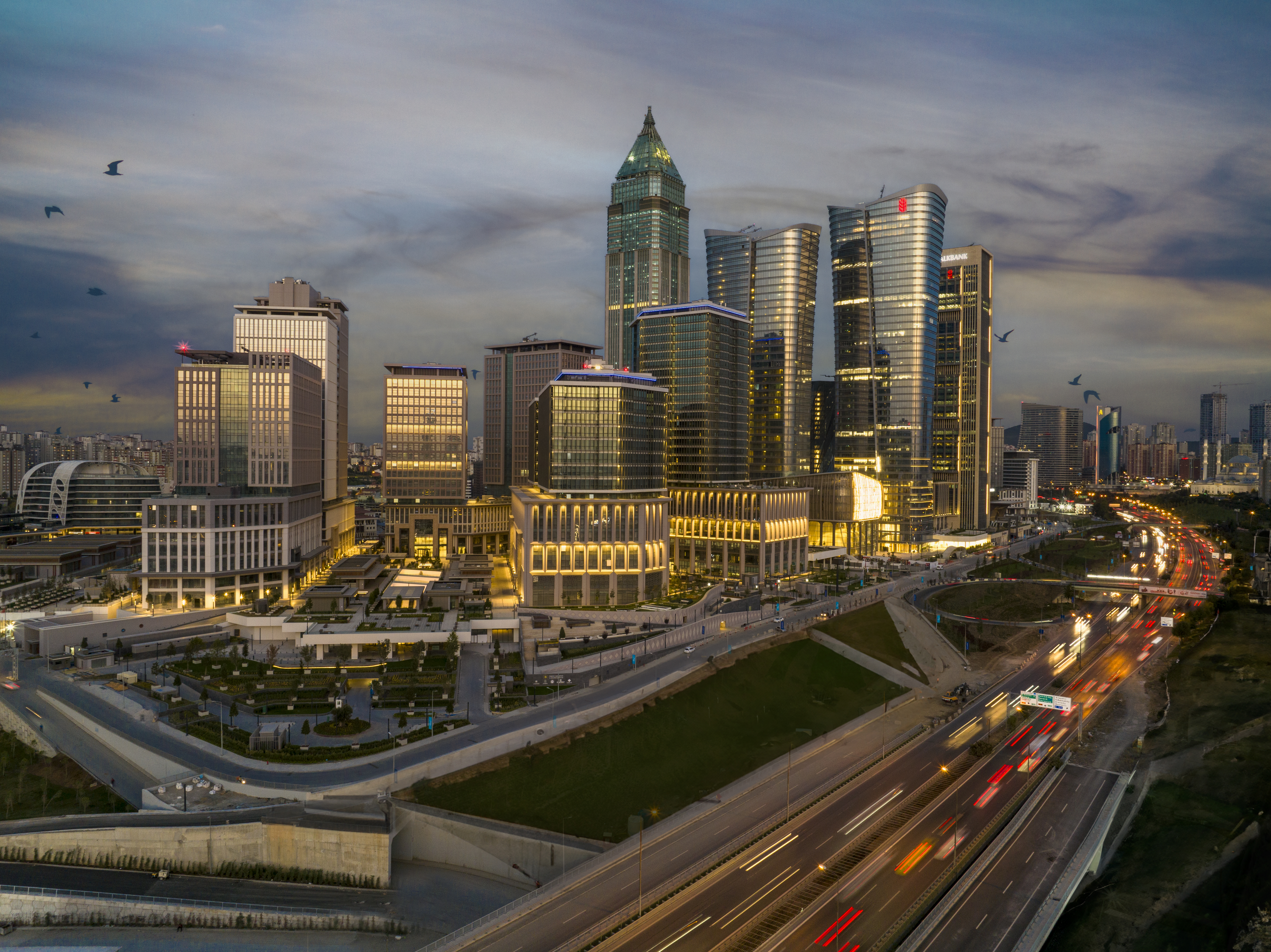
- A view of Istanbul Financial Center, with the CBRT Tower in the background

General information
- Status: Active
- Architectural style: Postmodernism
- Location: Finanskent, Istanbul, Turkey
- Opening: 17 April 2023
- Cost: ₺65 billion
- Owner: Turkey Wealth Fund

Other information
- Parking: 26,500 vehicles
- Public transit: Istanbul Metro: Finans Merkezi

Website
- ifm.gov.tr

The Istanbul Financial Center (IFC) (Note: Turkish: İstanbul Uluslararası Finans Merkezi) is a financial district serving banks, autonomous public institutions, multi-national companies and their related back offices and service firms.

Located on the Asian side of Istanbul, in the Finanskent quarter between the districts of Ümraniye and Ataşehir (closer to the latter), the IFC is intended to consolidate various financial institutions, services, and infrastructures within a designated area to promote collaboration, efficiency, and growth within the financial sector. Approximately 100 thousand employees work in the IFC.

== Development ==
The concept of the Istanbul Financial Center emerged in the early 2000s as part of Turkey's broader economic vision to elevate its status in the global financial arena. The project gained momentum with the formal announcement by the Turkish government in 2009. In 2023, the opening ceremony of the Istanbul Financial Center was held.

== Location ==
The IFC is situated in the Finanskent quarter near Ataşehir on the Anatolian (Asian) side of Istanbul.

== Components ==
The Istanbul Financial Center comprises several components designed to accommodate diverse financial activities and services. Regulatory agencies such as the Banking Regulation and Supervision Agency (BRSA) and the Capital Markets Board of Turkey (CMB) have a presence in the IFC. The center hosts national banks, investment firms, asset management companies, and other financial institutions.

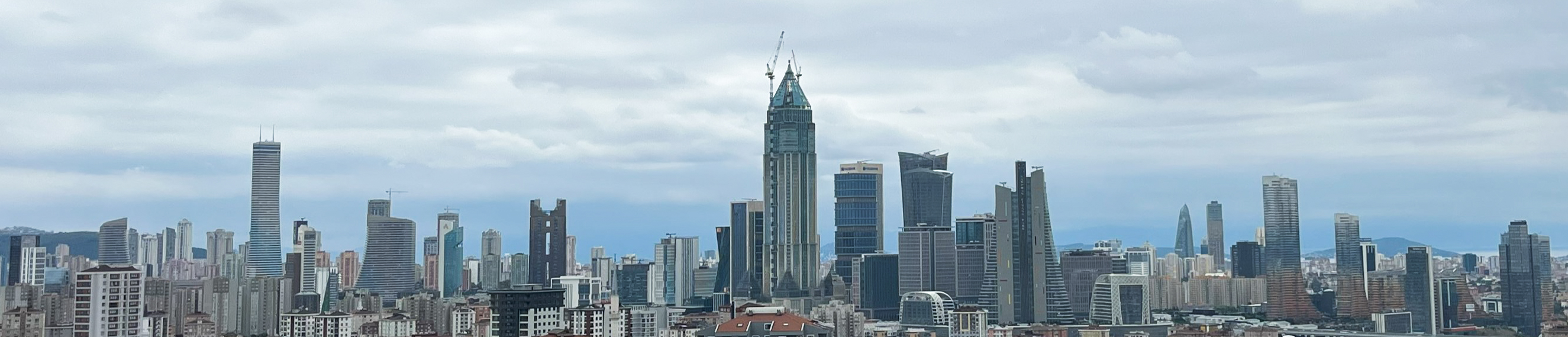
Istanbul Financial Center and the skyline of Ataşehir district on the Asian side of Istanbul

== See also ==
- CBRT Tower
- List of tallest buildings in Istanbul
