= Aukett Swanke =

British architectural firm

- Type: Public company
- Traded as: LSE: AUK
- Industry: Architecture
- Founded: 1972; 54 years ago
- Founder: Michael Claude Aukett
- Headquarters: London, United Kingdom
- Key people: Raúl Curiel (Non-executive Chairman); Nicholas Thompson (CEO)
- Products: Architectural and interior design
- Revenue: ▲£15.5 million (2019)
- Net income: ▲£0.3 million (2019)
- Number of employees: 132 (2024)
- Website: aukettswanke.com

Aukett Swanke is a British architectural and interior design company based in London.

== History ==
The firm was founded as an architectural and interior design partnership by Michael Aukett in 1972.

It acquired Fitzroy Robinson & Partners in 2005 to become Aukett Fitzroy Robinson and then acquired the European arm of Swanke Hayden Connell to form Aukett Swanke in December 2013.

In 2019, after making losses, the company announced that veteran Raul Curiel re-joined the Board and was appointed as chairman.
