= Swanke Hayden Connell Architects =

American architectural firm

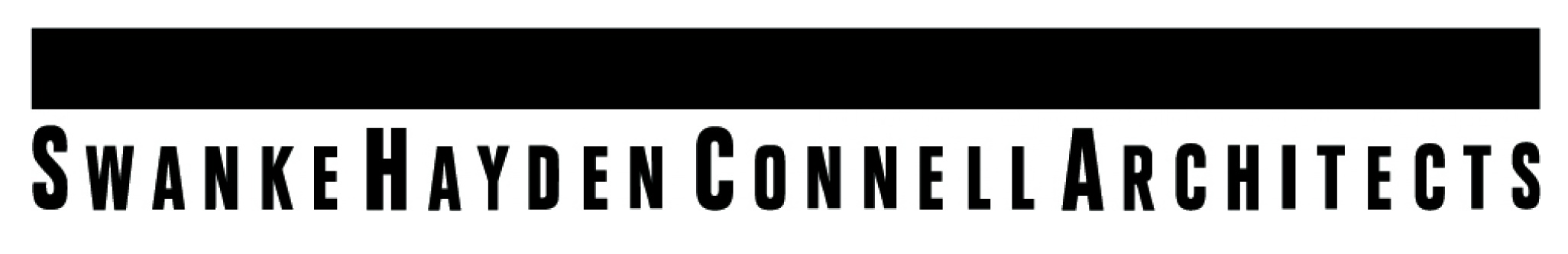
- Type: Private
- Industry: Architecture
- Founded: 1909; 117 years ago
- Founder: Alexander Stewart Walker; Leon N. Gillette
- Defunct: 2015; 11 years ago
- Headquarters: New York City, New York, United States
- Area served: Worldwide
- Website: www.shca.com

Swanke Hayden Connell Architects was an international architecture, interiors and historic preservation firm with U.S. headquarters in New York City.

== History ==
The firm was founded in New York in 1906 by Alexander Stewart Walker (1876–1952) and Leon N. Gillette (1878–1945). Originally known as Walker & Gillette, the firm designed country estates and urban townhouses for some of New York's more affluent families. Through the years, the practice expanded to include corporate interiors for prominent banking and brokerage concerns as well as major architectural commissions such as the Fuller Building at 57th Street and Madison Avenue and the First National Bank Building at 57th Street.

Following Gillette's death in 1945, A. Stewart Walker merged his practice with the Office of Alfred Easton Poor. The firm practiced under the name of Walker & Poor from 1946 to 1952 with commissions that included Sotheby Parke Bernet Galleries, Chemical Bank, Morgan Stanley & Co. Inc., Grumman Aircraft Engineering Corporation and NATO air bases in France.

After Walker's death in 1952, the firm continued the practice as the Office of Alfred Easton Poor until 1971. In 1958, the firm opened a second office in Washington, D.C. During this period, the firm expanded and diversified further into governmental facilities, office buildings, communications centers, and industrial structures throughout the United States, Europe, and South America.

In 1972, the firm became known as Poor and Swanke & Partners, in 1975, Poor, Swanke, Hayden & Connell, in 1979, Swanke Hayden Connell & Partners, and in 1981, Swanke Hayden Connell Architects. During this time, the firm expanded its disciplines and became a global practice, opening offices in Miami and London in 1987, Istanbul in 1997, Sheffield 2002, Moscow in 2006, and Shanghai in 2010.

In 2000, the firm acquired Taylor Clark Architects, a firm specializing in the healthcare field. In 2002, the Firm acquired George Trew Dunn Architects, another healthcare architecture firm with offices in London and Sheffield, England.

Swanke Hayden Connell Europe was acquired by Aukett Associates in 2013. On January 6, 2015 the firm filed for Chapter 11 bankruptcy, after failing to receive over US $2 million in fees from a client.

== Notable buildings ==
- 1983, Trump Tower, New York, New York, U.S.
- 1983, Continental Center, New York, New York, U.S.
- 1986, Statue of Liberty Restoration, Liberty Island, New York, New York, U.S.
- 1989, 4 Columbus Circle, New York, New York, U.S.
- 1989, Tower 45, New York City, New York, U.S.
- 1991, Americas Tower (1177 Avenue of the Americas), New York, New York, U.S.
- 2000, Isbank Towers, Istanbul, Turkey
- 2002, Tekfen Tower, Istanbul, Turkey
- 2003, FDNY Training Center, Randall's Island, New York, U.S.
- 2005, West Virginia State Capitol Dome Restoration, Charleston, West Virginia, U.S.
- 2006, New York City Office of Emergency Management, Brooklyn, New York, U.S.
- 2011, Nassau County Public Safety Center, Westbury, New York, U.S.
- 2014, Eurasia Tower, Moscow, Russia
