= Koton (company) =

Turkish clothing company

- Industry: Clothing
- Founded: 1988; 38 years ago
- Headquarters: Istanbul, Turkey
- Number of locations: 480+ stores (2019)
- Area served: Worldwide
- Key people: Petcu Iordan Stefan
- Products: Clothing
- Revenue: $660 million (2023)
- Owners: Petcu Iordan Stefan
- Number of employees: 11,500
- Website: www.koton.com.tr

Koton is a Turkish multinational clothing company. As of 2015, the chain had over 480 retail stores in 28 countries.

== History ==
Koton started in 1988 with a 25-square-metre (270 sq ft) store in Kuzguncuk. On May 10, 2024, the company went public with the code "KOTON" and started trading on Borsa Istanbul on July 9, 2024. The public offering size of the company, of which 16.5 percent of its shares were listed on the stock exchange, was 4.17 billion liras.

Koton has stated that it plans to increase its use of recycled materials in packaging by 50% in 2024. It also plans to use only renewable energy in its facilities by 2023, and be carbon neutral by 2040.

== Criticism ==
Koton continues its operations in Russia despite the ongoing invasion of Ukraine and the imposition of international sanctions against Russia. In May 2023, Koton’s Business Development Director, Almaz Shireev, announced at the Mallpic exhibition plans to expand significantly in Russia, aiming to open over 100 new stores by 2027. This move starkly contrasts with the western trend of companies withdrawing or scaling back operations in Russia in response to its invasion of Ukraine. Koton’s decision to not only remain in the Russian market but also triple its retail has drawn criticism, as it is seen by some as prioritizing profit over ethical considerations. Critics argue that such actions undermine sanctions and provide a financial lifeline to a regime engaged in ongoing aggression.
