= Skyland İstanbul =

Mixed-use skyscraper complex in Sarıyer, Istanbul, Turkey

- Skyland İstanbul

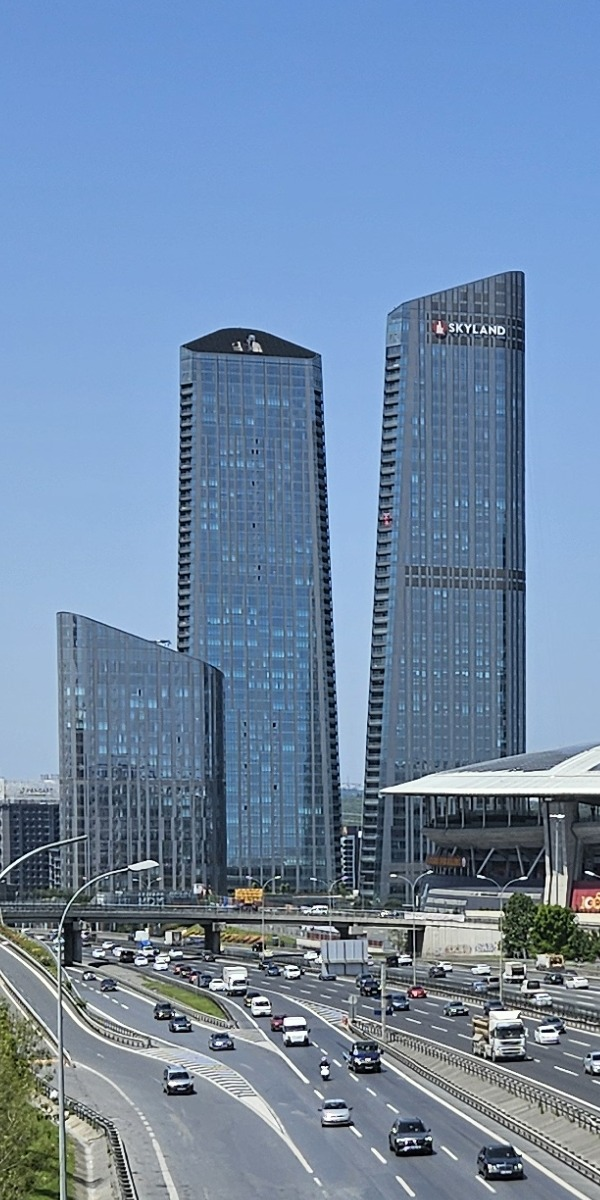
- Skyland İstanbul complex viewed from the east in 2024
- Interactive map of the Skyland İstanbul area

General information
- Status: Completed
- Type: Mixed-use
- Architectural style: Contemporary
- Location: Sarıyer, Istanbul, Turkey
- Coordinates: 41°06′30″N 29°01′20″E
- Construction started: 2014
- Completed: 2019
- Opening: October 2019

Height
- Roof: 284 m (932 ft)

Technical details
- Floor count: 65 (Office), 64 (Residence), 28 (Hotel)
- Floor area: 450,000 m^{2} (4,800,000 sq ft)

Design and construction
- Architect: Broadway Malyan
- Developer: Eroğlu Holding
- Structural engineer: Arup Group

Website
- skylandistanbul.com

Skyland İstanbul is a mixed-use skyscraper complex located in the Seyrantepe neighborhood of Sarıyer, Istanbul, Turkey. The complex consists of three towers: a 284-meter office tower with 65 floors, a residential tower of equal height with 64 floors, and a 155-meter hotel tower with 28 floors. Designed by British architectural firm Broadway Malyan and developed by Turkish conglomerate Eroğlu Holding, the complex was completed in 2019.

== History ==
Construction on Skyland İstanbul began in 2014 following approval from the Istanbul Metropolitan Municipality. The project formed part of Istanbul's broader urban development initiatives in its northern districts. After five years of construction, the complex opened to the public in October 2019 with an estimated total investment of $700 million USD.

== Architecture ==
The architectural design features a contemporary glass facade with vertical aluminum fins that provide sun shading. Engineers implemented a diagrid structural system to enhance the buildings' seismic performance, an important consideration given Istanbul's earthquake risk. The complex incorporates approximately 45,000 square meters of green space, including multiple sky gardens distributed throughout the towers.

== Facilities ==
The residential tower contains 830 luxury apartments ranging from one to five bedrooms. Office spaces total 504 units across 65 floors, with average floor plates measuring 1,500 square meters. The hotel component includes 300 guest rooms and a conference center capable of accommodating 550 attendees. Shared amenities include fitness facilities, swimming pools, and retail spaces occupying the lower six floors of the complex.

== Significance ==
Upon completion, the office and residential towers became the third and fourth tallest buildings in Istanbul. The complex received BREEAM Excellent certification for its sustainable design features, which include rainwater harvesting systems and energy-efficient climate control systems.

== In popular culture ==
The distinctive silhouette of Skyland İstanbul has appeared in several media productions, most notably as a filming location for the 2021 action film Eurasian Heist. The towers frequently feature in establishing shots of Istanbul used by international media outlets.

== Awards and recognition ==
The complex has received several awards including the 2020 European Property Award for Best Mixed-Use Development and the 2022 Istanbul Architecture Award in the High Rise category. Its sustainable design earned BREEAM Excellent certification in 2021.

== See also ==
- List of tallest buildings in Istanbul
- Architecture of Turkey
