= Beşiktaş =

District of Istanbul, Turkey

- District and municipality
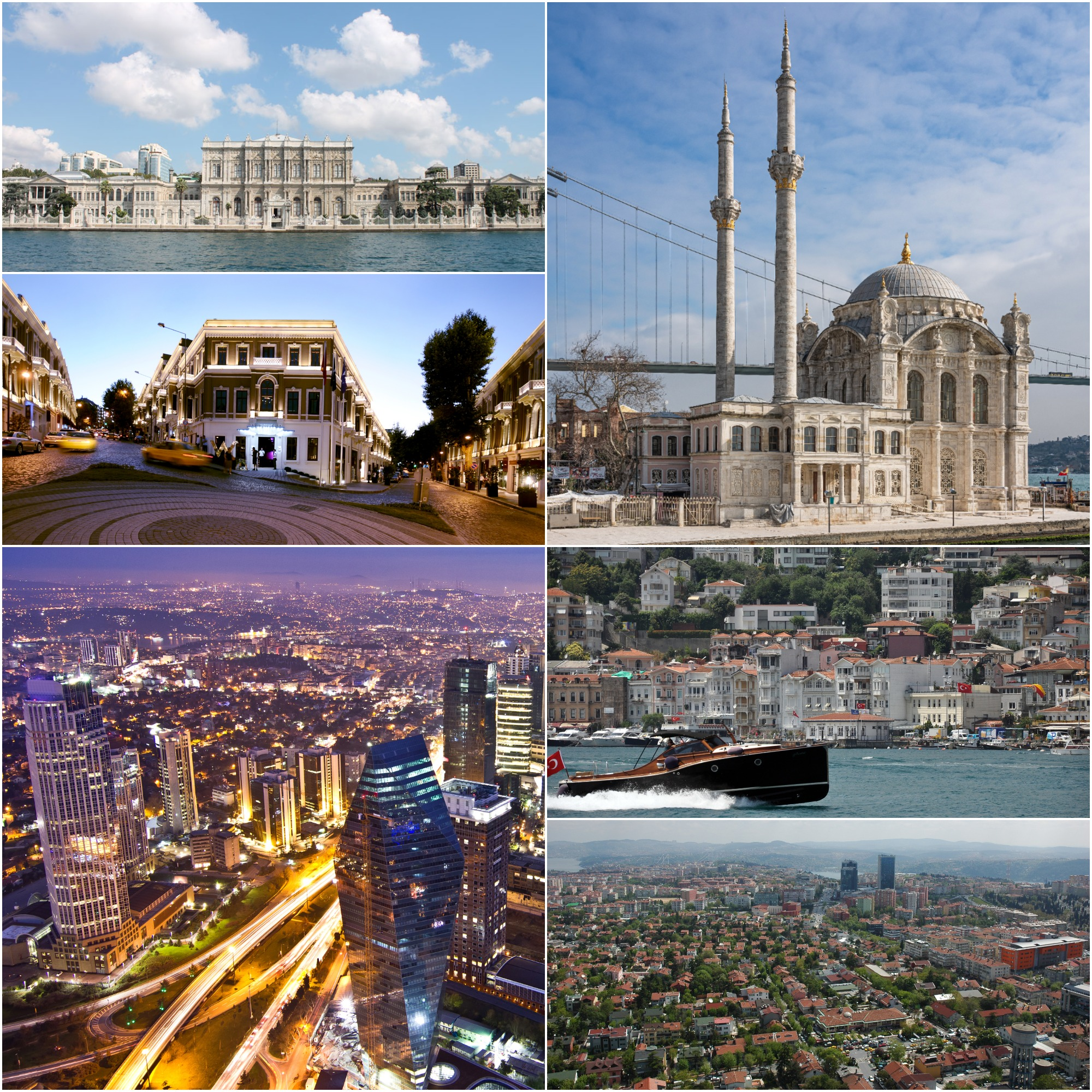
- Clockwise from top right: Ortaköy Mosque; Arnavutköy; Levent and Etiler; view of Büyükdere Avenue; Akaretler Row Houses; and Dolmabahçe Palace

- Logo

- Map showing Beşiktaş District in Istanbul Province

- Location within Turkey Location within Istanbul
- Coordinates: 41°02′33″N 29°00′26″E
- Country: Turkey
- Province: Istanbul

Government
  - Mayor: Ömer Rasim Şişman (CHP)
  - Kaymakam: Oğuzhan Bingöl
- Area: 18 km^{2} (6.9 sq mi)
- Population (2022): 175,190
  - Density: 9,700/km^{2} (25,000/sq mi)
- Time zone: UTC+3 (TRT)
- Area code: 0212
- Website: www.besiktas.bel.tr

Beşiktaş (pronounced [beˈʃictaʃ]) is a district and municipality of Istanbul, Turkey. Its area is 18 km^{2} and its population is 175,190 (2022). It is located on the European shore of the Bosphorus strait. It is bordered on the north by Sarıyer and Şişli, on the west by Kağıthane and Şişli, on the south by Beyoğlu, and on the east by the Bosphorus. Directly across the Bosphorus is the district of Üsküdar.

The district includes a number of important sites along the European shore of the Bosphorus, from Dolmabahçe Palace in the south to the Bebek area in the north. It is also home to many inland (and relatively expensive, upper-middle class) neighborhoods such as Levent and Etiler. Some of its other well-known neighborhoods include Yıldız, Kuruçeşme, Ortaköy, and Arnavutköy.

Beşiktaş' historic commercial centre is the Beşiktaş quarter and Çarşı (literally, "marketplace"), which adjoins the small Abbasağa Park. The district is home to the oldest sports club and powerhouse Beşiktaş and its stadium, Beşiktaş Park. Running in the north–south direction, Barbaros Boulevard is a major feeder road for the inner-city motorway Otoyol 1 and the Bosphorus Bridge, terminating at the important public transport hub of Zincirlikuyu. Büyükdere Avenue also runs through the district.

Although it is a relatively small district of Istanbul, both in terms of population and area, Beşiktaş is one of the city's most important areas due to its business and shopping areas, historic sites, universities, scenic views of the Bosphorus strait, and feeder roads for the Bosphorus and Fatih Sultan Mehmet bridges passing through it. The district is also the leading financial center of Turkey.

In a 2013 ranking of Turkish districts, Beşiktaş placed first overall due to its high quality of life, prosperity, and cultural level. Beşiktaş is also the highest ranking Turkish district in terms of the Human Development Index, with an HDI of 0.864, while also ranking first in the individual indexes for income and education. The municipality is taking part in the Cities4Europe campaign and has qualified as a "European 12 Star City".

== Name ==
The district takes its name from the Beşiktaş quarter located in the modern-day Sinanpaşa neighborhood. Along with Çarşı, this historic center is sometimes referred to as Köyiçi (roughly "inner village") by locals.

The word beşik means 'cradle' in Turkish, and taş means 'stone'.

According to one story, there was a Byzantine church in modern-day Beşiktaş with the name Kounopetra, Greek for 'stone cradle'. The church was built to honor a relic, a stone reportedly taken from the stable in Bethlehem where Jesus was born. This stone was later relocated to Hagia Sophia and disappeared during the Fourth Crusade, possibly to be sold in Europe's relics market.

Another story states that a cleric from a Saint Menas (Aya Menas) Church where Beşiktaş now is returned from a pilgrimage to Jerusalem with a cradle-shaped stone used in the baptism of Jesus and placed it in the church.

One other explanation is that the name is a corruption of beş taş, Turkish for 'five stones', referring to the five stone pillars built to moor ships by Barbarossa Hayreddin Pasha.

== History ==
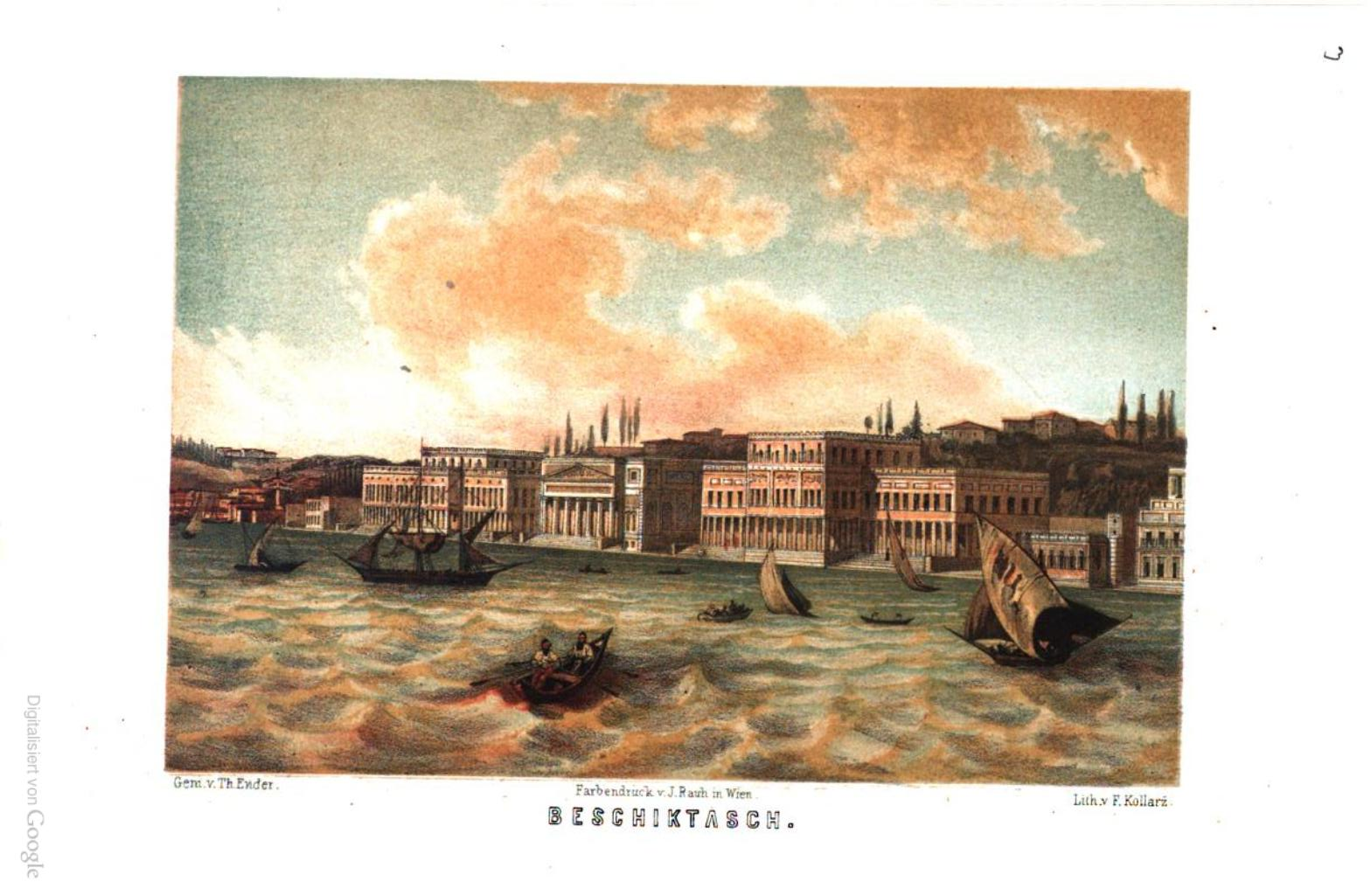
Beşiktaş circa 1850

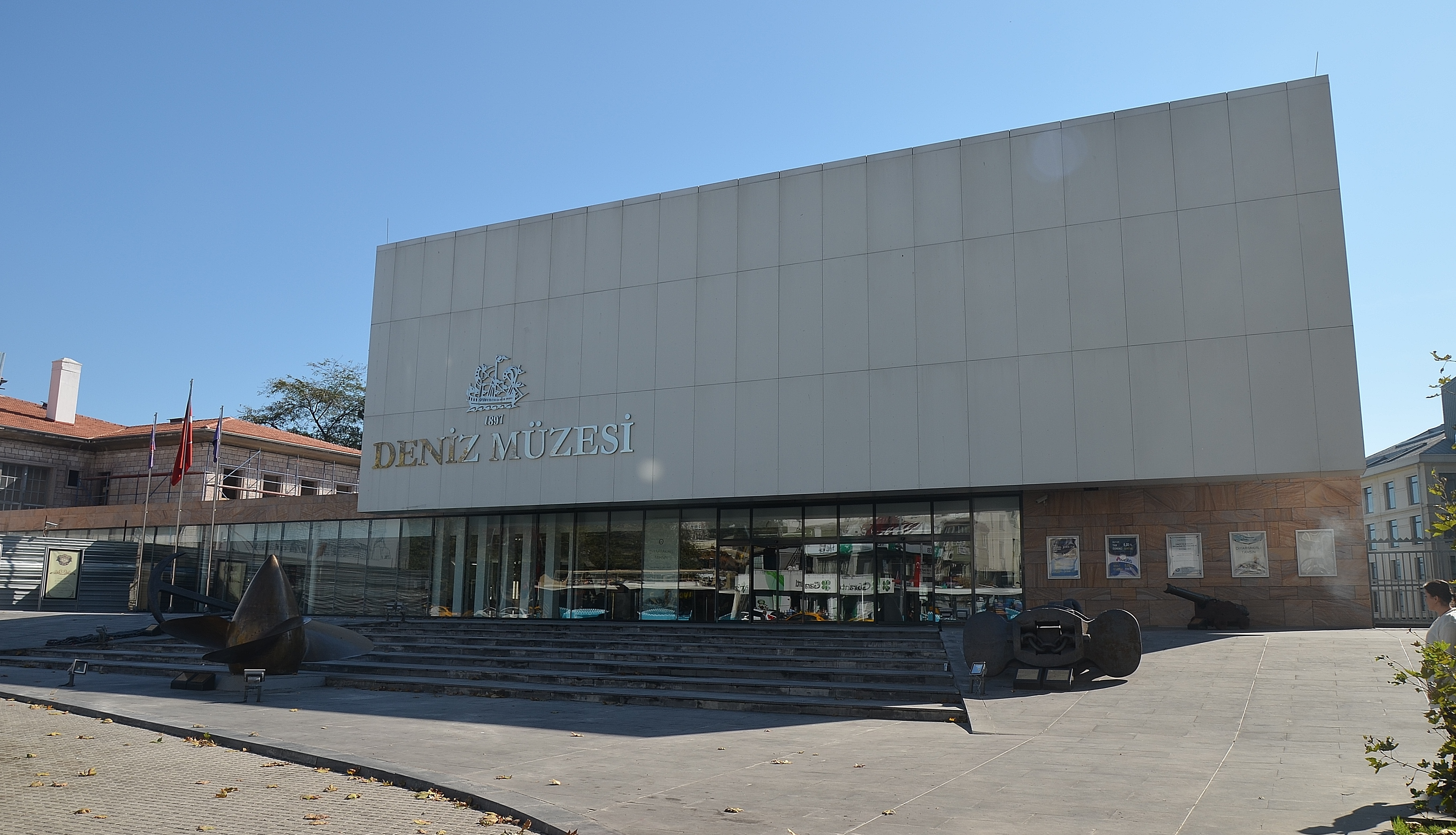
New Istanbul Naval Museum building

The Bosphorus has been settled for a long time, and there are many places of historical interest in Beşiktaş. The area is believed to have been settled by Constantine the Great during his reign (306–337 CE). This stretch of the Bosphorus shore is somewhat sheltered from the strong northeasterly winds that bring storms to Istanbul, and thus it forms an ideal mooring place for ships.

In Byzantine times, the area was called Diplokionion, meaning "double pillar" in Greek, as it was the location of a set of twin pillars marking a key entry from the water into Constantinople. These columns would later provide the model for the twin pillars at the water's edge in Venice.

In ancient times the villages on the Bosphorus shore were isolated communities in the forest that lined the water-side. The Bosphorus, however, was prominent in the history and mythology of the ancient Greeks, and villages like Beşiktaş would have had their place in traditional tales such as Jason and the Argonauts. In the Byzantine era, churches and a monastery were built and the tradition of having a summer palace on the Bosphorus was begun by the Byzantines with their Ayios Mamas palace complex. The Bosphorus settlements, however, being outside the city walls, were vulnerable to raiders from the Black Sea coasts, and little of this architecture or the statuary that would have decorated it so gloriously has survived.

In the Ottoman period, once the Sultans had established control of the Black Sea coasts, the Ottoman navy was docked in the Bosphorus and the Bosphorus villages became safe and attractive again. One man, in particular, the sailor Barbarossa Hayreddin, built his palace and mosque in Beşiktaş, making it his home. By now Beşiktaş was an established Bosphorus crossing for caravans trading across Anatolia and along the Silk Road, and for Ottoman armies.

According to Ottoman estimations of 1882, the district of Beşiktaş had a total population of 28,777, consisting of 10,753 Muslims, 9,248 Greeks, 4,897 Armenians, 3,057 Jews, 601 Catholics, 203 Bulgarians and 18 Latins.

This coast was very attractive to the Ottoman rulers, who built hunting lodges and then great palaces in the area, and the Beşiktaş district today contains some of the most important and grand Ottoman buildings. The area was thus the scene of great intrigues of the late Ottoman period such as the dethronement of Sultan Abdülaziz at Dolmabahçe Palace in a coup in 1876, the announcement of the founding of the Ottoman parliament in 1908, and the deposing of Sultan Abdul Hamid II at Yıldız Palace in 1909.

Following the foundation of the Turkish Republic in 1923, the Ottoman ruling family was deported and the palaces and mansions along the coast were emptied. Some were given to new government ministries, some used as schools and other public buildings, others burnt down or were demolished.

Today, it is widely accepted by the residents of the area that the most significant resident of Beşiktaş was Zübeyde Hanım, the mother of Mustafa Kemal Atatürk, who lived in the old quarter at the heart of Beşiktaş, literally right next to the then headquarters of Beşiktaş J.K.

Besides the more historic areas such as Yıldız, Ortaköy, Kuruçeşme, Arnavutköy, Bebek, many residential areas in the district started to form around the 1950s. For example, the foundations of Levent (named after the Levent Farm previously located there) were established in the 1950s when construction began on a prestigious suburban mass housing project. The Etiler, Konaklar, Akatlar, Nisbetiye, Levazım and Kültür neighborhoods followed soon after.

In 2016 and 2017, there were two terror attacks in the district. One was outside a stadium and the other was at a nightclub. The site of the 2016 attack has been commemorated as the 10 December Martyrs Park.

== Climate ==
Beşiktaş experiences a humid subtropical climate (Cfa/Cf) according to both Köppen and Trewartha climate classifications, with cool winters and warm to hot summers. As its location in the middle of coastal Istanbul suggests, it has a transitional climate between the oceanic climate to the north, and the Mediterranean climate to the south, and is a good average of climates across Istanbul. It is classified as USDA hardiness zone 9a, and AHS heat zone 3.

Climate data for Kireçburnu, (Note: Kireçburnu, while in Sarıyer District, is the closest station to Beşiktaş proper.) Istanbul (normals 1991–2020, precipitation days and sunshine 1981-2010, snowy days 1996-2011)
| Month | Jan | Feb | Mar | Apr | May | Jun | Jul | Aug | Sep | Oct | Nov | Dec | Year |
|---|---|---|---|---|---|---|---|---|---|---|---|---|---|
| Record high °C (°F) | 22.4 (72.3) | 24.6 (76.3) | 29.3 (84.7) | 33.6 (92.5) | 36.4 (97.5) | 40.2 (104.4) | 41.5 (106.7) | 40.5 (104.9) | 39.6 (103.3) | 34.2 (93.6) | 27.8 (82.0) | 25.5 (77.9) | 41.5 (106.7) |
| Mean daily maximum °C (°F) | 8.8 (47.8) | 9.4 (48.9) | 12.0 (53.6) | 16.1 (61.0) | 21.0 (69.8) | 25.7 (78.3) | 28.0 (82.4) | 28.2 (82.8) | 24.6 (76.3) | 19.9 (67.8) | 15.0 (59.0) | 10.7 (51.3) | 18.3 (64.9) |
| Daily mean °C (°F) | 5.9 (42.6) | 6.1 (43.0) | 8.0 (46.4) | 11.5 (52.7) | 16.3 (61.3) | 21.1 (70.0) | 23.7 (74.7) | 24.2 (75.6) | 20.5 (68.9) | 16.2 (61.2) | 11.7 (53.1) | 7.9 (46.2) | 14.4 (58.0) |
| Mean daily minimum °C (°F) | 3.6 (38.5) | 3.5 (38.3) | 4.9 (40.8) | 8.1 (46.6) | 12.8 (55.0) | 17.4 (63.3) | 20.3 (68.5) | 21.2 (70.2) | 17.4 (63.3) | 13.6 (56.5) | 9.2 (48.6) | 5.5 (41.9) | 11.5 (52.6) |
| Record low °C (°F) | −13.9 (7.0) | −16.1 (3.0) | −11.1 (12.0) | −2.0 (28.4) | 1.4 (34.5) | 7.1 (44.8) | 10.5 (50.9) | 10.2 (50.4) | 6.0 (42.8) | 0.6 (33.1) | −7.2 (19.0) | −11.5 (11.3) | −16.1 (3.0) |
| Average precipitation mm (inches) | 96.1 (3.78) | 87.7 (3.45) | 69.8 (2.75) | 45.1 (1.78) | 37.1 (1.46) | 44.7 (1.76) | 36.3 (1.43) | 43.5 (1.71) | 81.3 (3.20) | 98.3 (3.87) | 100.5 (3.96) | 124.8 (4.91) | 865.2 (34.06) |
| Average precipitation days (≥ 0.1 mm) | 16.9 | 15.2 | 13.2 | 10.0 | 7.4 | 7.0 | 4.7 | 5.1 | 8.1 | 12.3 | 13.9 | 17.5 | 131.3 |
| Average snowy days (≥ 0.1 cm) | 4.5 | 4.7 | 2.9 | 0.1 | 0.0 | 0.0 | 0.0 | 0.0 | 0.0 | 0.0 | 0.3 | 2.7 | 15.2 |
| Average relative humidity (%) | 79.8 | 78.6 | 75.8 | 75.1 | 76.5 | 75.7 | 75.3 | 75.9 | 75.0 | 78.4 | 78.9 | 78.4 | 76.9 |
| Mean monthly sunshine hours | 68.2 | 89.6 | 142.6 | 180.0 | 248.0 | 297.6 | 319.3 | 288.3 | 234.0 | 158.1 | 93.0 | 62.0 | 2,180.7 |
| Mean daily sunshine hours | 2.2 | 3.2 | 4.6 | 6.0 | 8.0 | 9.6 | 10.3 | 9.3 | 7.8 | 5.1 | 3.1 | 2.0 | 5.9 |
| Percentage possible sunshine | 22 | 29 | 38 | 46 | 57 | 64 | 69 | 66 | 65 | 46 | 31 | 22 | 46 |

== Government ==
Beşiktaş is located on the European side of Istanbul Province. It became an independent district in 1930 after its separation from Beyoğlu, and the municipal government was founded in 1984. The district is composed of 23 neighbourhoods:

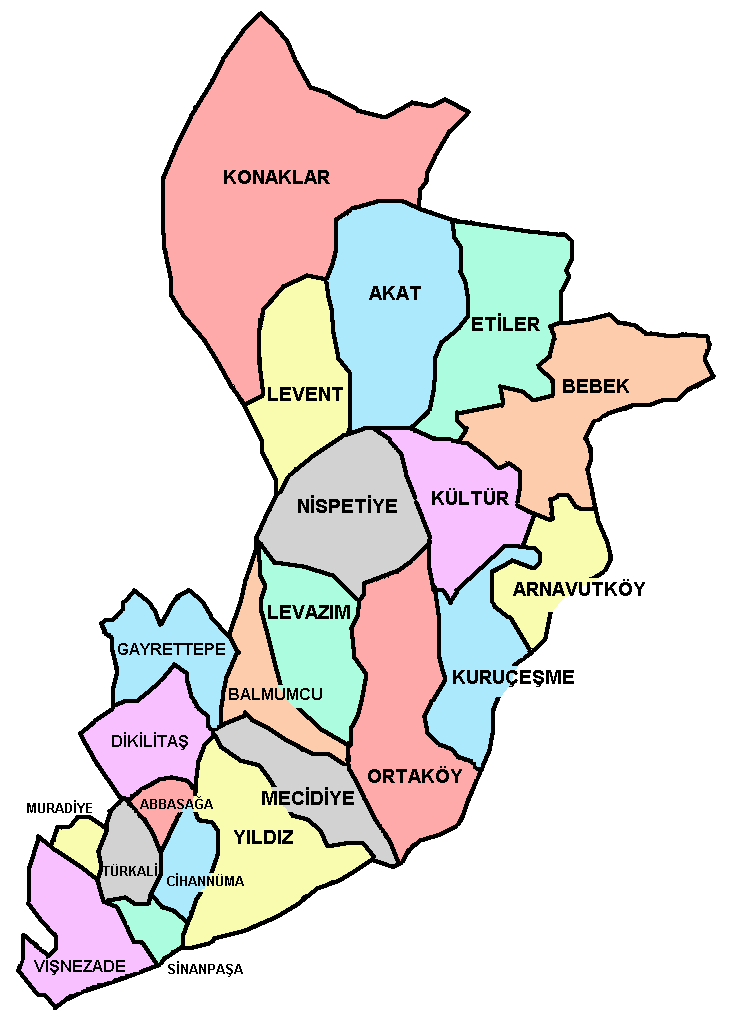
Ulus is located within the top half of Ortaköy on this antiquated map. It had been a part of Ortaköy until 1988.

- Abbasağa
- Akat
- Arnavutköy
- Balmumcu
- Bebek
- Cihannüma
- Dikilitaş
- Etiler
- Gayrettepe
- Konaklar
- Kültür
- Kuruçeşme
- Levazım
- Levent
- Mecidiye
- Muradiye
- Nisbetiye
- Ortaköy
- Sinanpaşa
- Türkali
- Ulus
- Vişnezade
- Yıldız

== Historic quarters ==
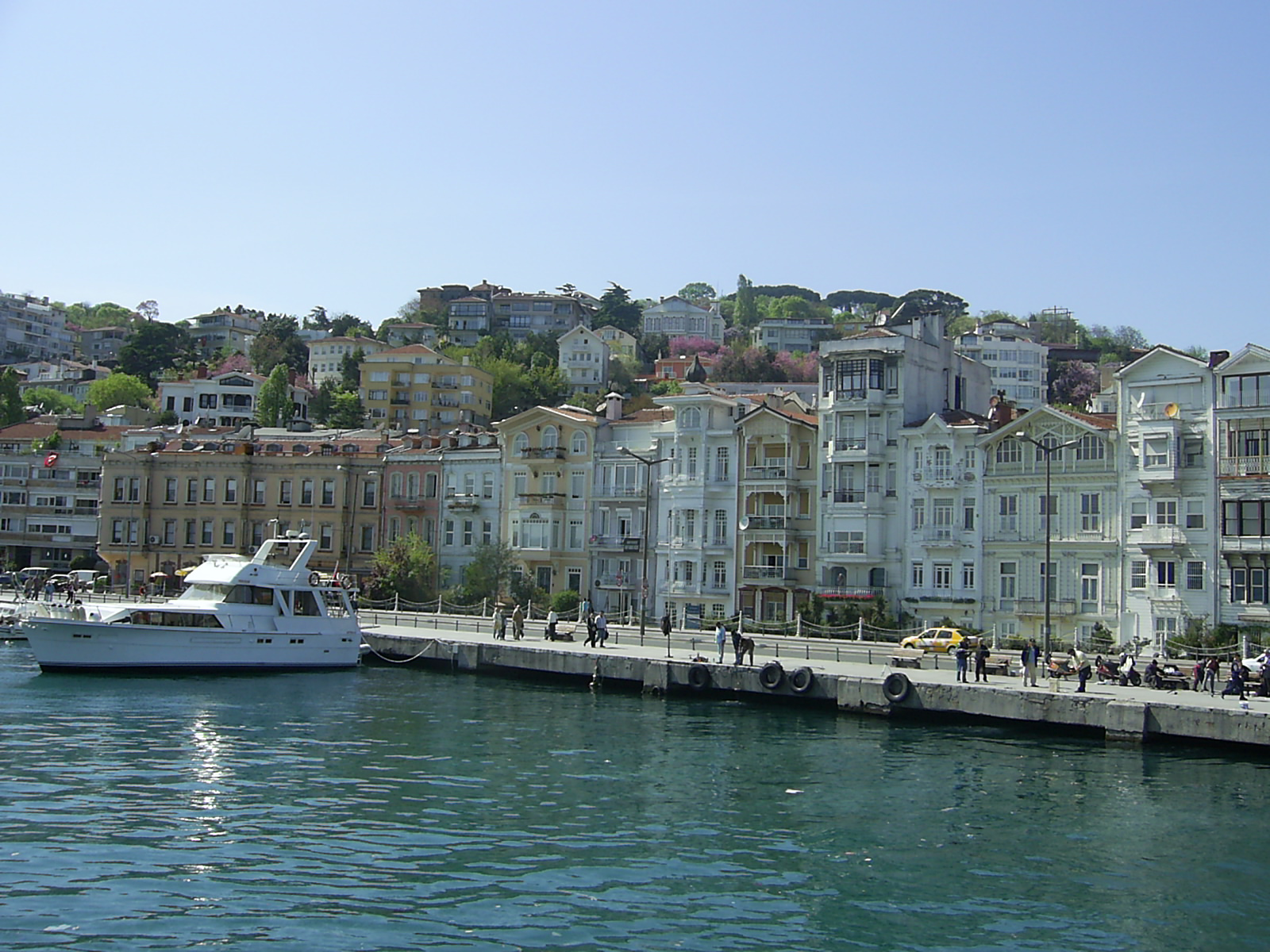
Arnavutköy

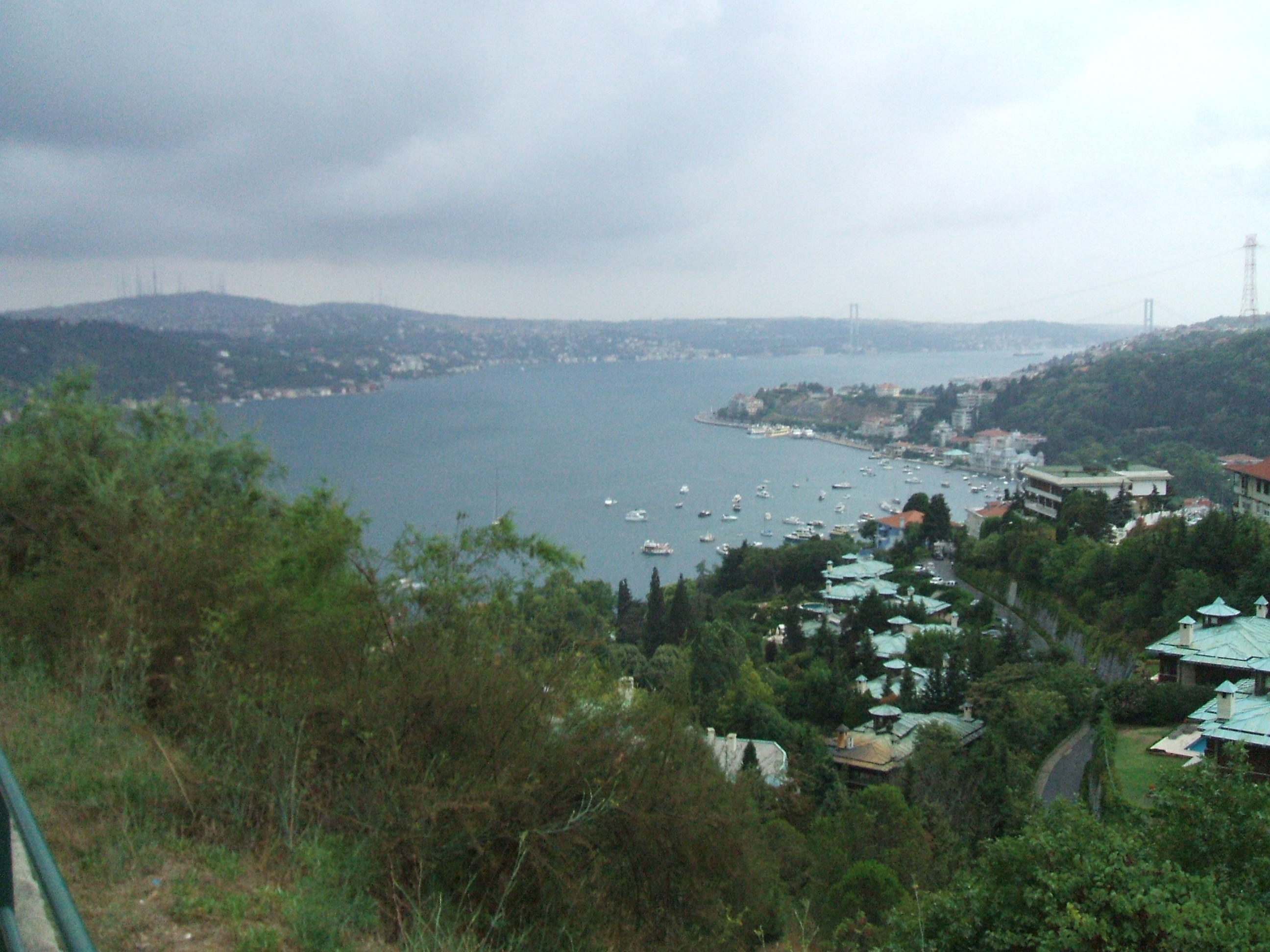
Bebek bay

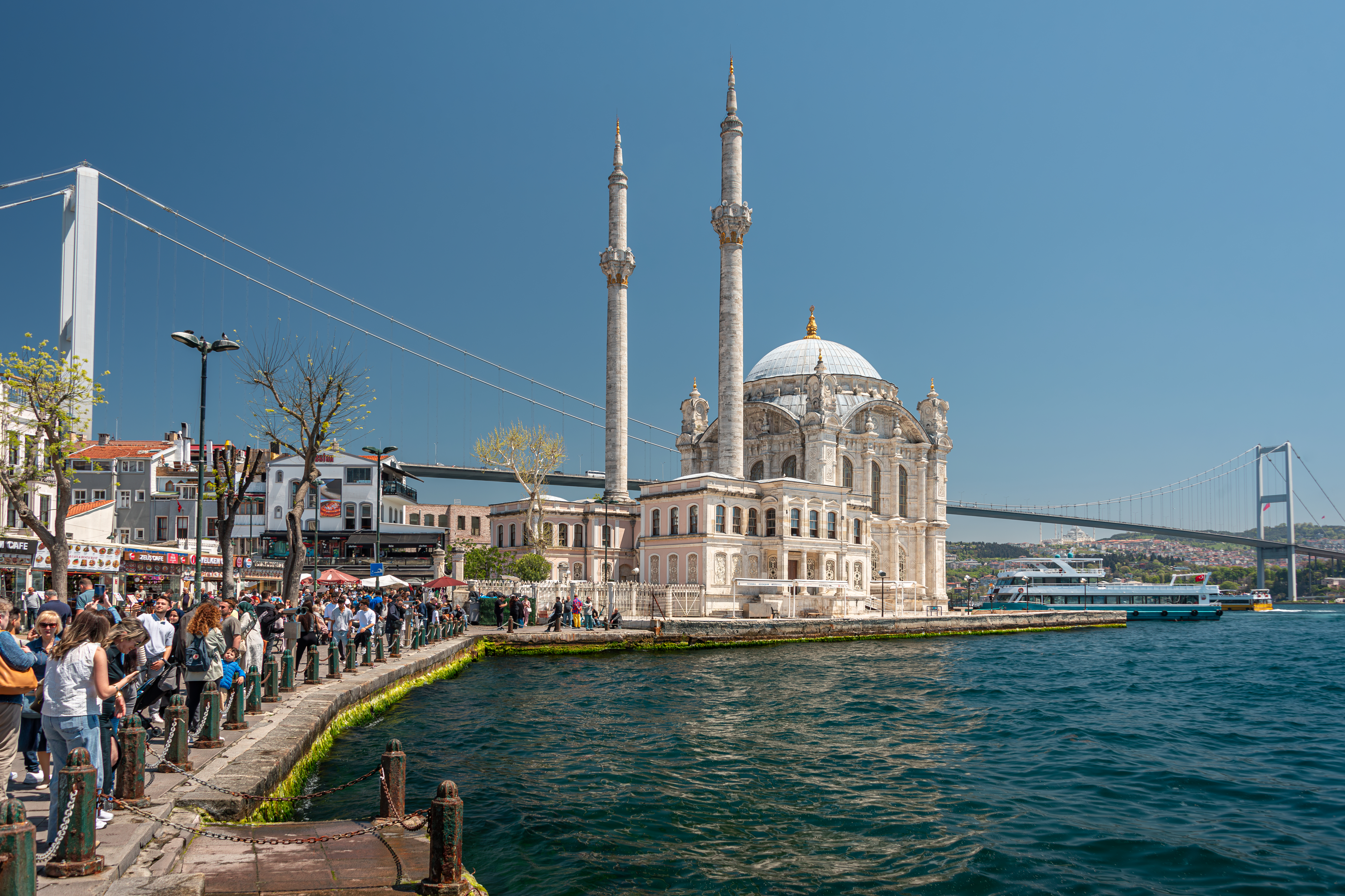
Ortaköy

Arnavutköy: Located between Bebek and Kuruçeşme. It is famous for its many colorful yalıs which line the coastline.

Aşiyan: Located between Bebek and Rumelihisarı. The Turkish poet Tevfik Fikret used to live in a house on the hillside, which is now a museum. The neighborhoods name, meaning nest in Persian, derives from this house.

Bebek: The origins for Bebek's name go back to the Conquest of Istanbul. The exact origin of the name, which literally means 'baby', is unknown, but some speculate that it comes from the Turkish saying 'pretty as a baby'. Bebek has been an affluent district dotted with yalıs and hillside mansions since the 18th century. Today it is still a very expensive neighborhood filled with cafés, restaurants and shops catering to the elite of Istanbul. It is also famous for its badem ezmesi.

Beşiktaş: One of Istanbul's oldest quarters and the origin of the district's name. One of the main commercial district of Istanbul. It is known for its cafés, bakeries, meyhanes (pubs), night clubs and fish restaurants. The area itself is divided between Çarşı on the east and Akaretler on the west. Both are part of the Sinanpaşa neighborhood. Çarşı (literally marketplace) is home to Beşiktaş Çarşı, Barbaros Square and the Istanbul Naval Museum.

Dolmabahçe: Located south of Valideçeşme and north of Kabataş. Today it is administratively part of the Vişnezade neighborhood. Its name comes from the Dolmabahçe Palace. The BJK Inönü Stadium is located here.

Kuruçeşme: Located along the Bosphorus and known for its mansions. Many expensive restaurants and clubs are located on the coast here.

Ortaköy: Known today for its iconic mosque and square. Historically a multicultural area. It is famous for its kumpir.

Valideçeşme: Located immediately west of Akaretler. Today it is a part of the Vişnezade neighborhood.

Yıldız: Located to the east of Barbaros Boulevard. It is home to the Yıldız Palace, which itself is located in Yıldız Park, one of the biggest green spaces in central Istanbul. Both the Galatasaray University and the Yıldız Technical University have their main campuses here. Çırağan Palace and the Kabataş Erkek Lisesi, one of the most prestigious high schools in Turkey, are also located in the neighborhood.

== Places of interest ==
Beşiktaş is home to many historic and modern places of interest. Among the most notable are Dolmabahçe Palace, Çırağan Palace, Yıldız Palace, and Ortaköy Mosque.

The Levent neighborhood is home to many modern shopping malls and office buildings. Some of Turkey's tallest buildings are located in the area, along Büyükdere Avenue.

=== Historic ===
- Abbas Ağa Mosque
- Akaretler Row Houses
- Barbarossa Hayreddin Pasha Memorial
- Bebek Mosque
- Çırağan Palace
- Dolmabahçe Palace
- Dolmabahçe Clock Tower
- Esma Sultan Mansion
- Feriye Palace
- Hatice Sultan Palace
- Istanbul Naval Museum
- Ihlamur Palace
- Makruhyan Armenian School
- Malta Kiosk
- Naime Sultan Mansion
- Orhaniye Barracks
- Ortaköy Mosque
- Ortaköy Kethuda Hammam
- Sinan Pasha Mosque
- Tomb of Hayreddin Barbarossa
- Yahya Efendi Lodge
- Yıldız Hamidiye Mosque
- Yıldız Park
- Yıldız Porcelain Factory
- Yıldız Palace
- Yıldız Clock Tower

=== Modern ===
- Akmerkez
- Beşiktaş Stadium
- Istanbul Sapphire
- İş Towers
- Kanyon
- MetroCity
- Sabancı Center
- Zorlu Center

== Economy ==
With the Ottoman dynasty's settlement in Dolmabahçe in the 17th century and many workers eventually settling in houses and mansions in Beşiktaş, many shopping places like Çarşı popped up, helping the area to be a developing economic center. But with the proclamation of the Republic of Turkey, and the capital being moved to Ankara, Beşiktaş's economic development came to a halt.

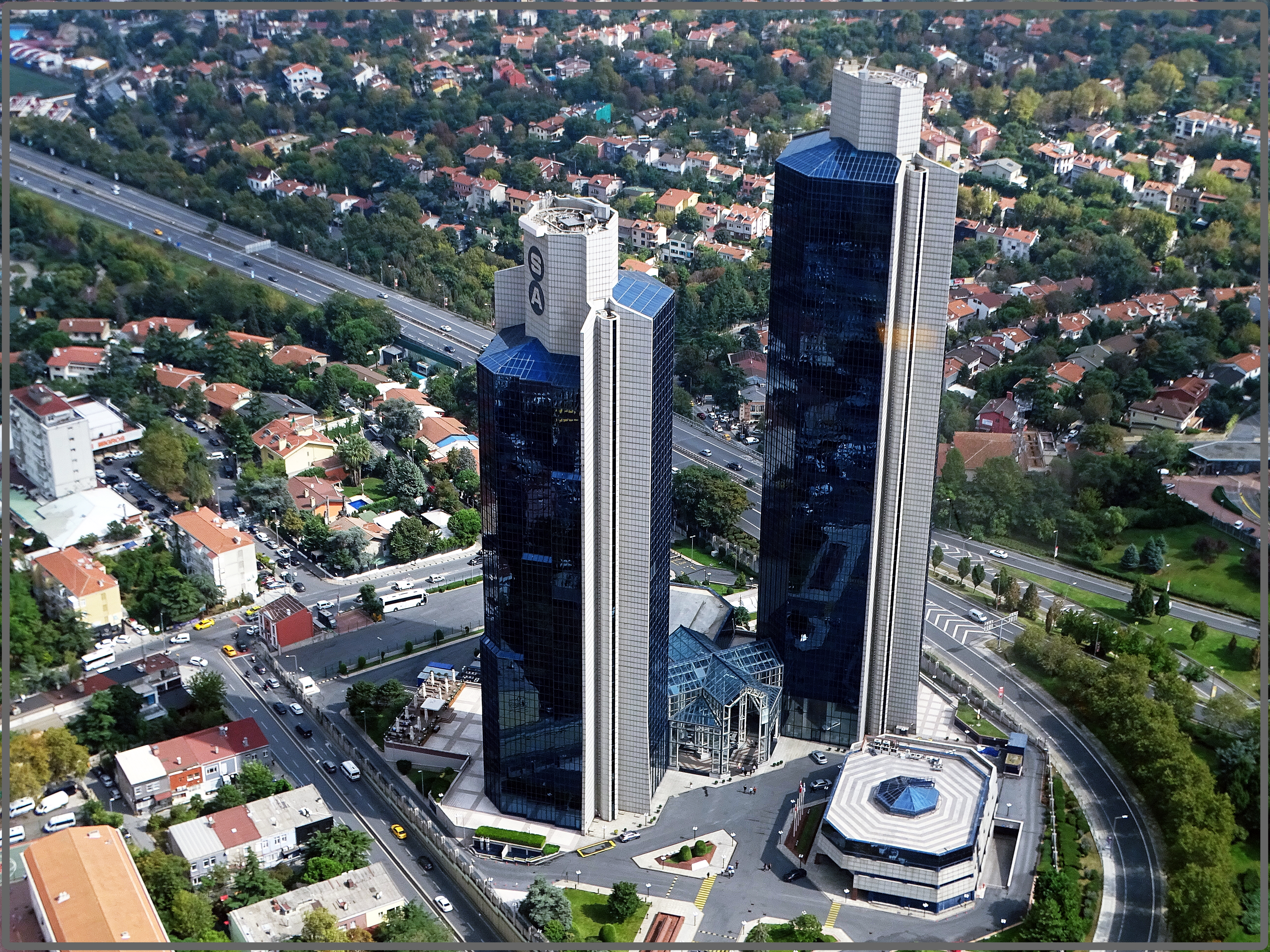
Sabancı Center

In the 1950s with the birth of the Levent and Etiler neighborhoods, and the construction of Barbaros Boulevard. The district started growing back and eventually transportation levels in the neighborhoods rose, and with the construction of the Bosphorus Bridge in 1973, many businesses centers and shopping malls got constructed and the district became a business district and tourism, with many skyscrapers and hotels like the Sabancı Center and Isbank Towers eventually getting built.

Beşiktaş is home to İşbank, Garanti BBVA, Akbank, Yapı Kredi and Fibabanka's head offices and embassies of Azerbaijan, Bulgaria, Denmark, Egypt, Israel, Northern Cyprus, South Africa, Spain, and the United Arab Emirates. The consulate of Saudi Arabia, formerly in Beşiktaş, was moved to a building in the Istinye neighborhood in Sarıyer district in September 2019, following the murder of journalist Jamal Khashoggi in the building in 2018.

== Sports ==
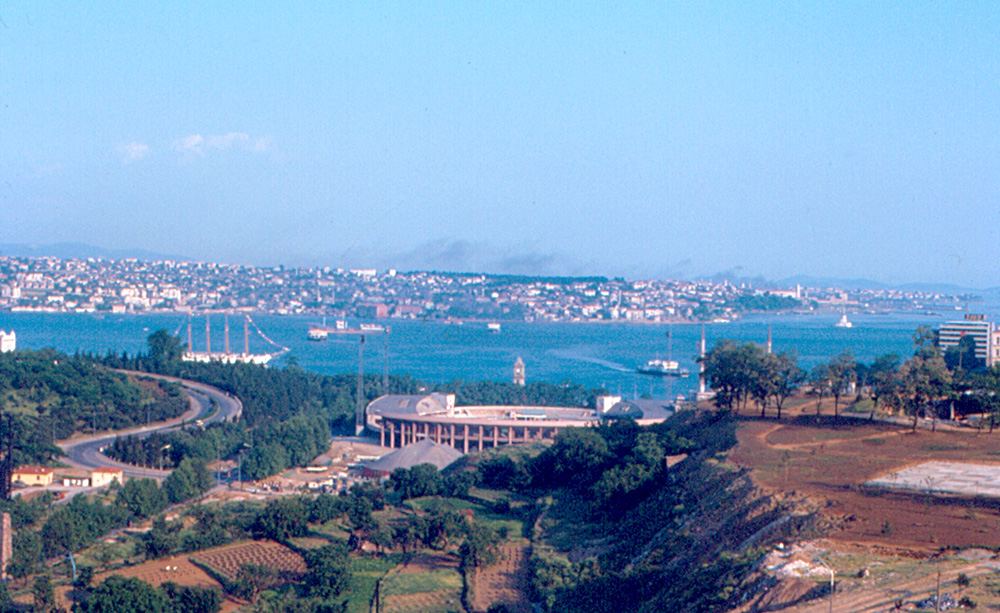
View of BJK İnönü Stadium, 1967

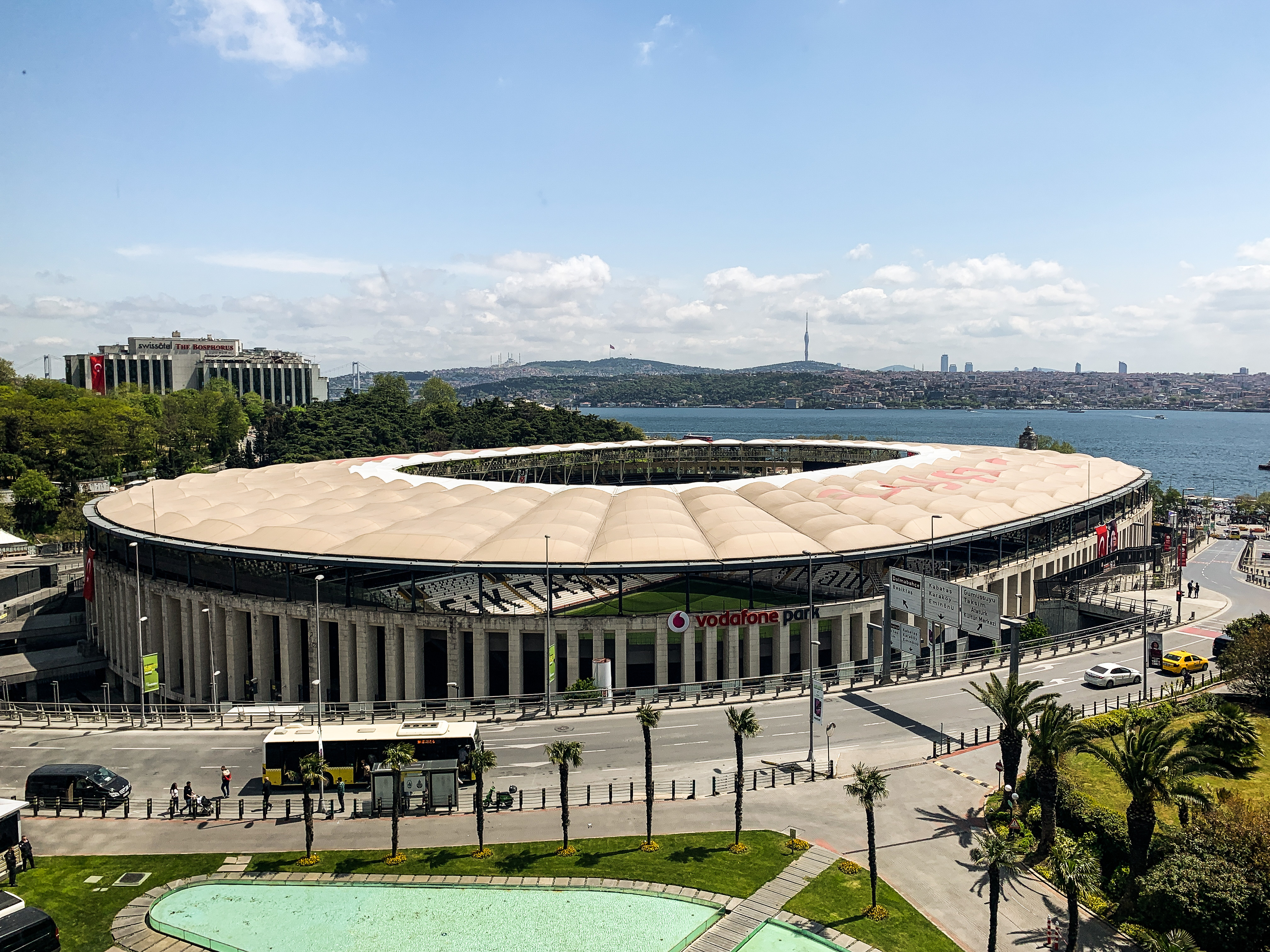
Exterior view of Beşiktaş Stadium

The area gives its name to Turkey's oldest sports club, Beşiktaş Jimnastik Kulübü (Beşiktaş Gymnastics Club), founded in 1903. The club's football team is one of the top three in Turkey, having won 16 Turkish Super League titles and participating regularly in the UEFA Champions League and Europa League. The team played their home games at the historic İnönü Stadium, which was demolished in 2013 and replaced on the same grounds by the 42,590 seat Beşiktaş Stadium. There are Beşiktaş Museum Turkey's largest sport museum located in the stadium. The stadium is near Dolmabahçe Palace at the shore of the Bosphorus. The football team wears black and white shirts and is nicknamed the Black Eagles. The club has earned notoriety for its faithful fans, who have broken volume records with 132 decibel cheers. BJK Akatlar Arena is the home of the basketball team. The club's most famous supporter group is called Çarşı, and is known for its involvement in social and political issues.

Besides Beşiktaş JK, the district is also home to the smaller yet historic Ortaköy SK. The Istanbul Specialized Swimming Club was the first specialized swimming club in the country. In addition, there are a number of other amateur sports clubs and Levent Tennis Club.

Many of the notable sporting facilities in the district belong to Beşiktaş JK; such as Beşiktaş Stadium, BJK Akatlar Arena, Süleyman Seba Sports Centre, Fulya Training Facilities and Çilekli Football Field.

== Education and culture ==
Beşiktaş is arguably the most important educational center of Istanbul. The central campuses of some of Turkey's leading universities, such as Boğaziçi University, Galatasaray University, and Yıldız Technical University are located in the district. The Turkish War Academies and central parts of Beykent University, Kadir Has University, Istanbul Technical University, and Mimar Sinan Fine Arts University can also be found here.

Many notable primary and secondary schools such as Robert College, Etiler Anadolu Lisesi, the Istanbul Japanese School, MEF International School, the Etiler campus of the British International School Istanbul, and the Etiler campus of the Tarabya British Schools, can be found in Beşiktaş. A total of 43 K-12 schools (12 private) are listed by the municipality.

Museums in the district include the Aşiyan Museum, the Beşiktaş JK Museum, Istanbul Naval Museum, Istanbul State Art and Sculpture Museum, Istanbul City Museum, Yıldız Palace Museum, and the Firefighting Museum.

As of 2018, there are 18 art galleries, 20 libraries, 12 theatre venues, and 8 movie theatres with numerous screens listed by the municipality. In addition, there are other notable performance venues such as Kuruçeşme Arena and Zorlu Performing Arts Center.

Beşiktaş Culture Center, founded in 1994 by Yılmaz Erdoğan and Necati Akpınar, is known nationwide for its theatre, cinema, and television productions.

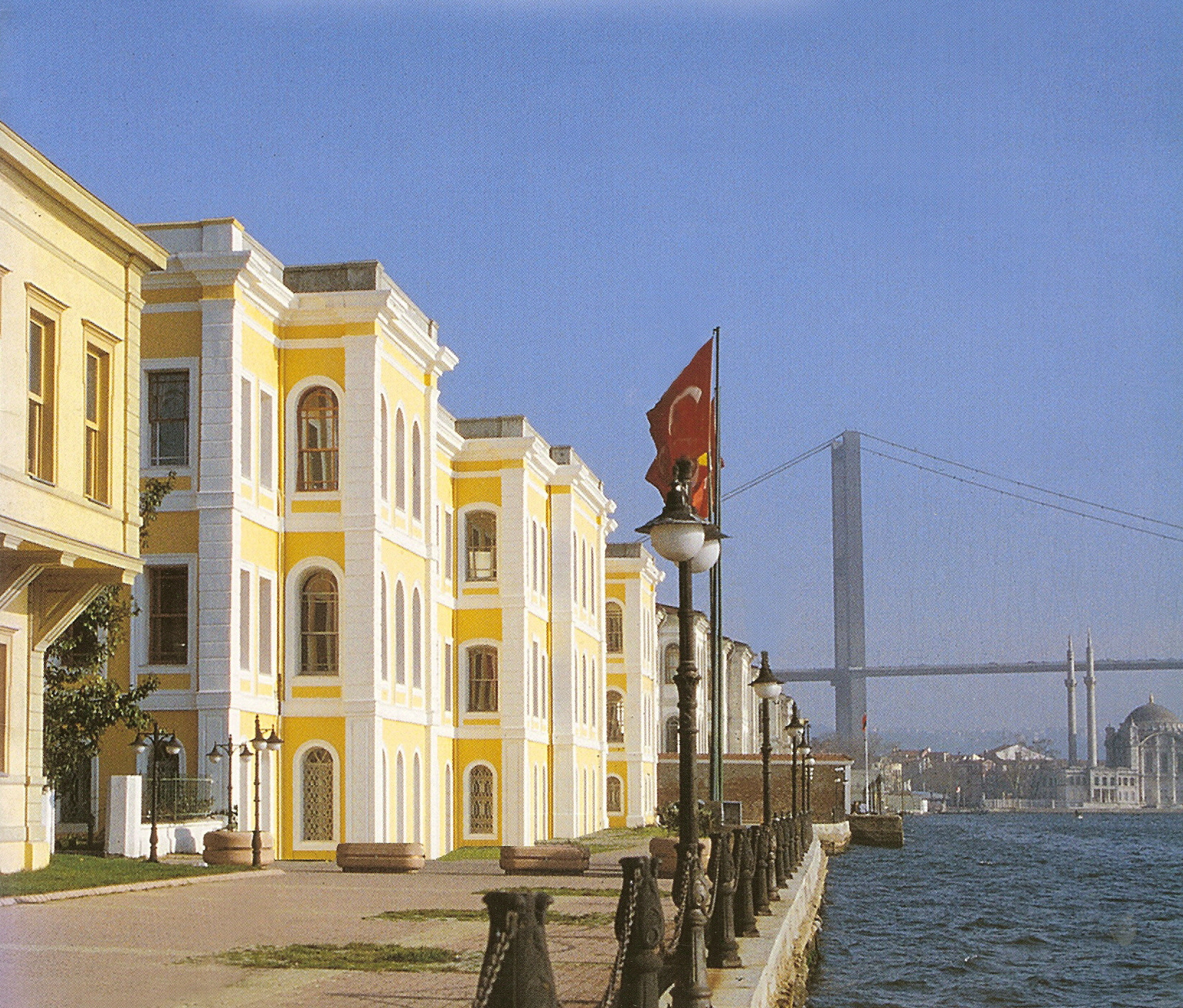
Galatasaray University

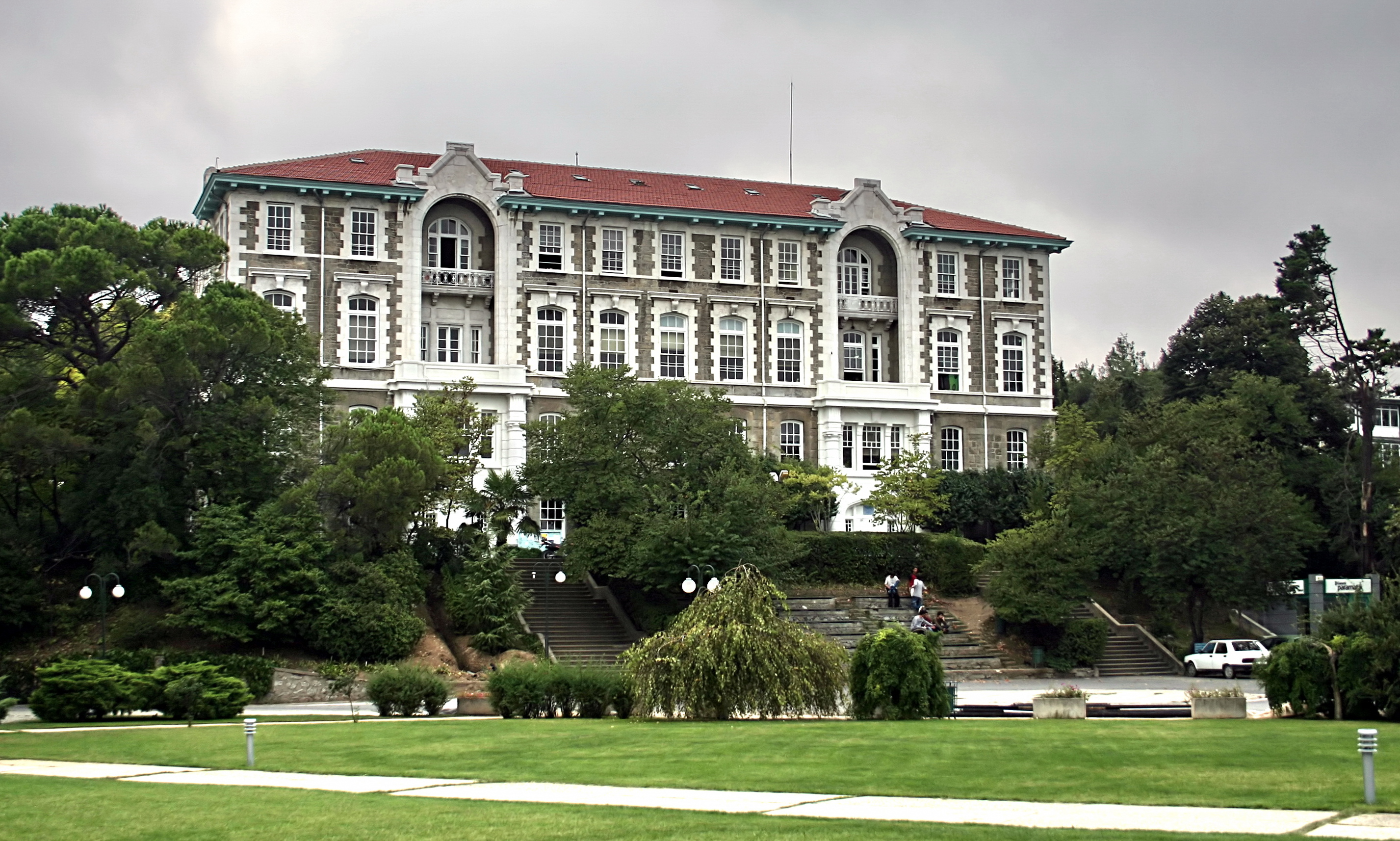
Boğaziçi University Faculty of Science and Letters building

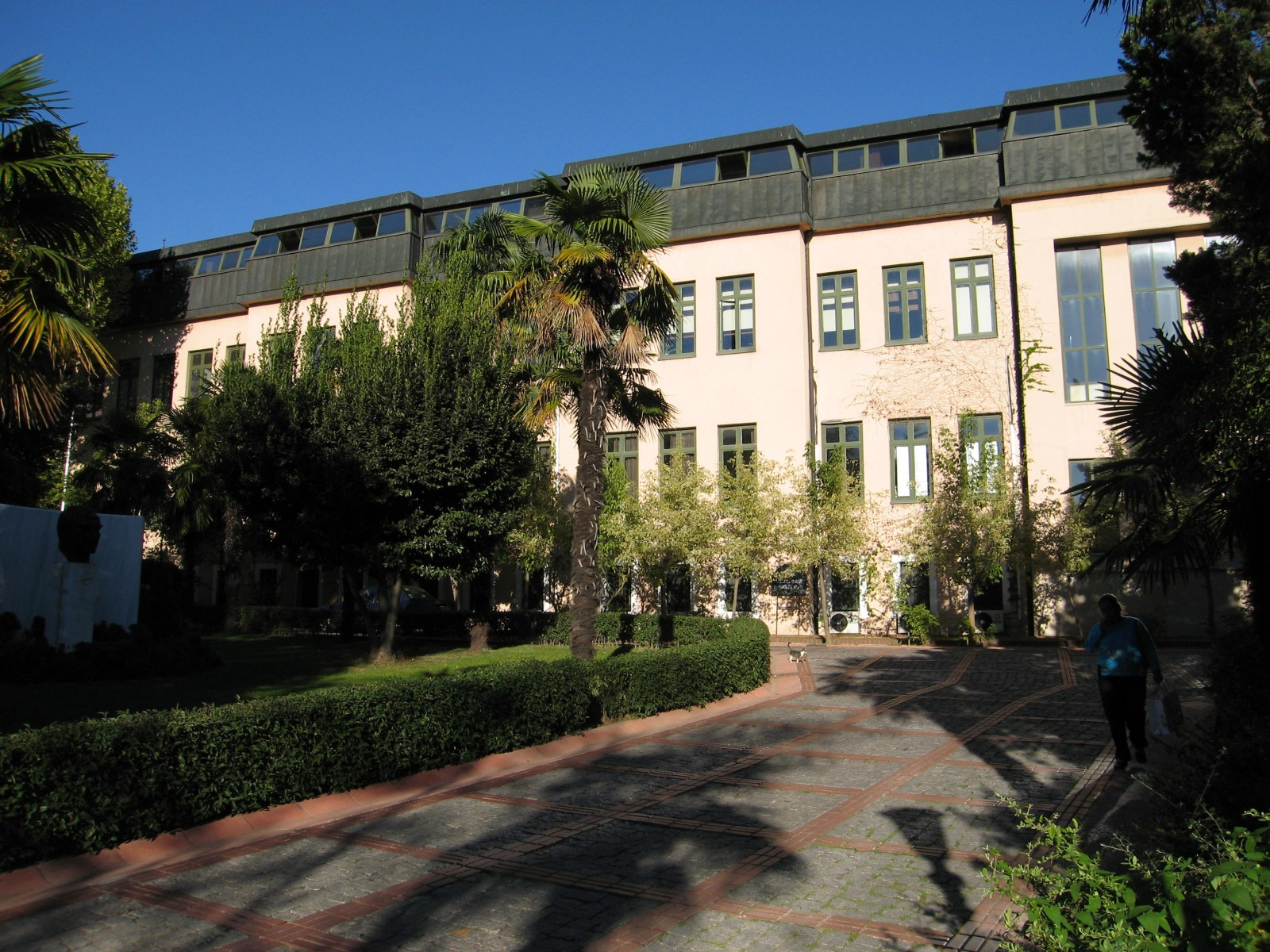
Yıldız Technical University Faculty of Engineering

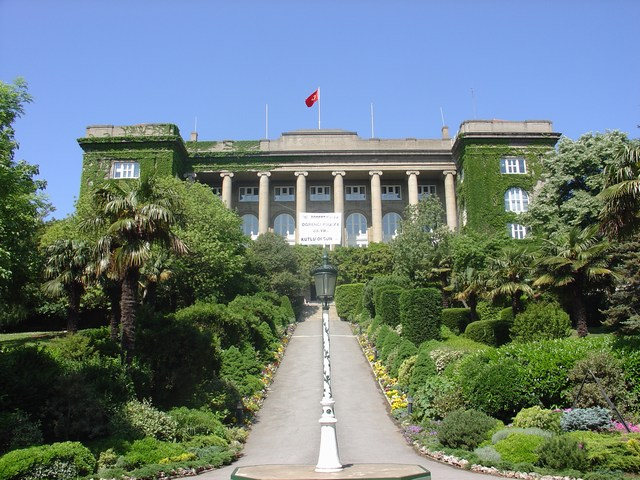
Robert College, Gould Hall

== Transportation ==
Beşiktaş is an important transport hub with ferries going to several European locations as well as to the Asian side and dozens of buses departing from the area. There are ferries to Kadıköy, Eminönü, Üsküdar, Adalar, Sarıyer and the coastal towns of Beykoz.

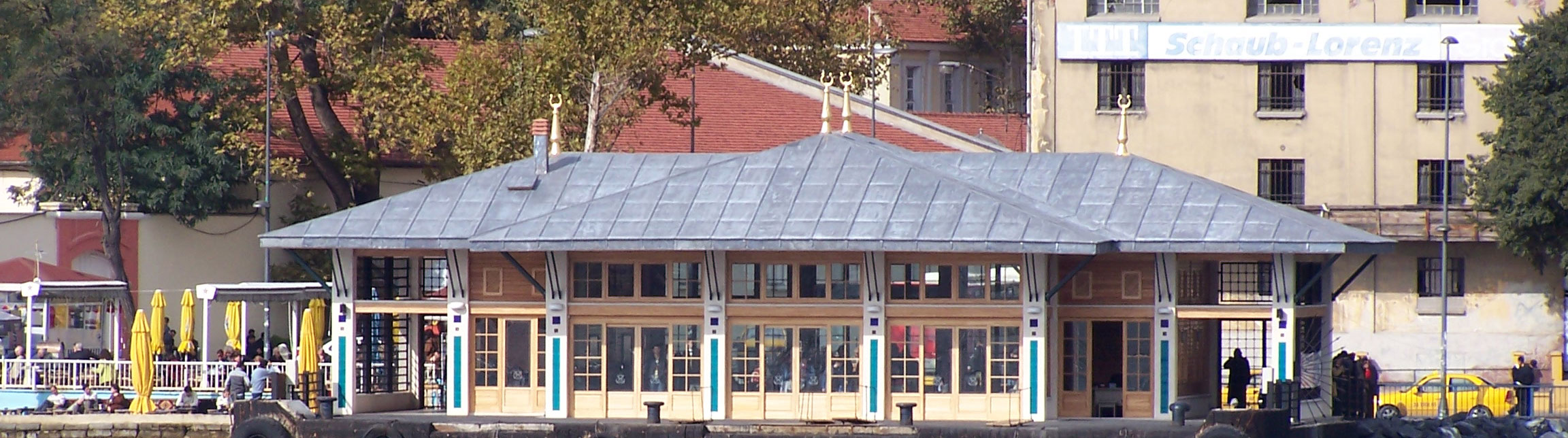
Beşiktaş Barbarossa Hayreddin Pasha pier

=== Rail Transport ===
The M2 metro line runs via Levent and under the Büyükdere Avenue to Taksim and Maslak. The M6 line is a short line operating from Levent to the Boğaziçi University via Etiler. The newly built M7 line terminates at Yıldız with an extension to Beşiktaş Çarşı under construction.

=== Road Transport ===
The Boğaziçi Bridge and the Fatih Sultan Mehmet Bridge crossing the Bosphorus are in the located district. Both of Istanbul's beltways (Otoyol 1 and Otoyol 2) pass through the district. Büyükdere Avenue and Barbaros Boulevard are other major thoroughfares.

=== Naval Transport ===
There are several Ferry Terminals that are located in the area, such as Ortakoy, Besiktas and its variations of Turyol and Dentur, Bebek, and Asiyan. Their routes mostly comprise of those going to the eastern side of the city, though some serve as stops to a further area.

== International relations ==
=== Involvement ===
The municipality is an associated partner of Eurocities and is involved in a number of working groups ranging from urban ageing to migration and integration. It is also a part of the Cities4Europe campaign.

Beşiktaş was awarded the '12 Star City' title for 2016 and 2017 by the Council of Europe.

=== Twin municipalities ===
- Brooklyn, New York City, United States, since 2005.
- Erlangen, Bavaria, Germany, since 2004.
- Güzelyurt, Northern Cyprus
- Lewisham, London, United Kingdom
- Shkodër, Albania
- Songpa-gu, Seoul, South Korea
- Trenčín, Slovakia
- Xanthi, Greece

== Gallery ==
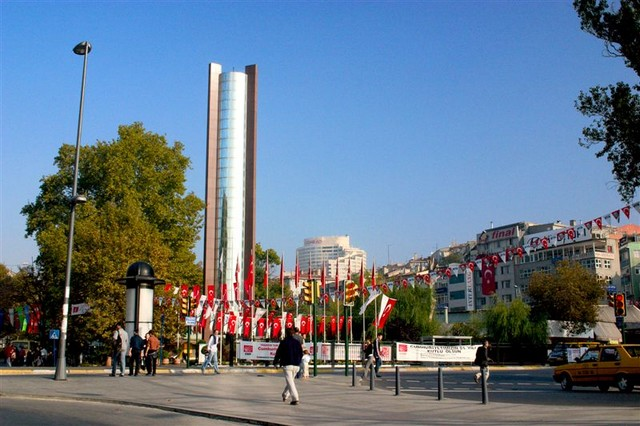
Beşiktaş Square

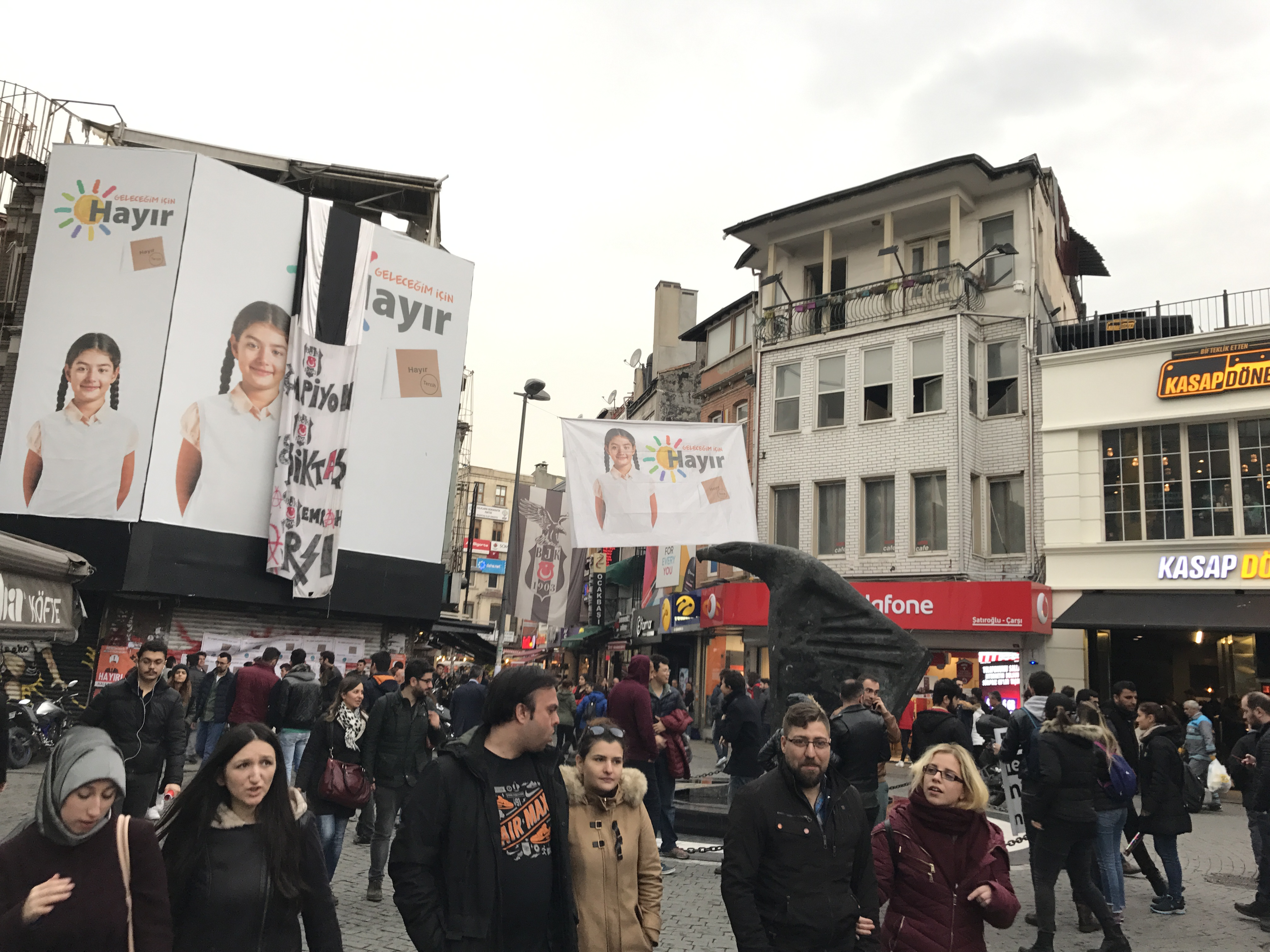
Beşiktaş "Eagle Square"

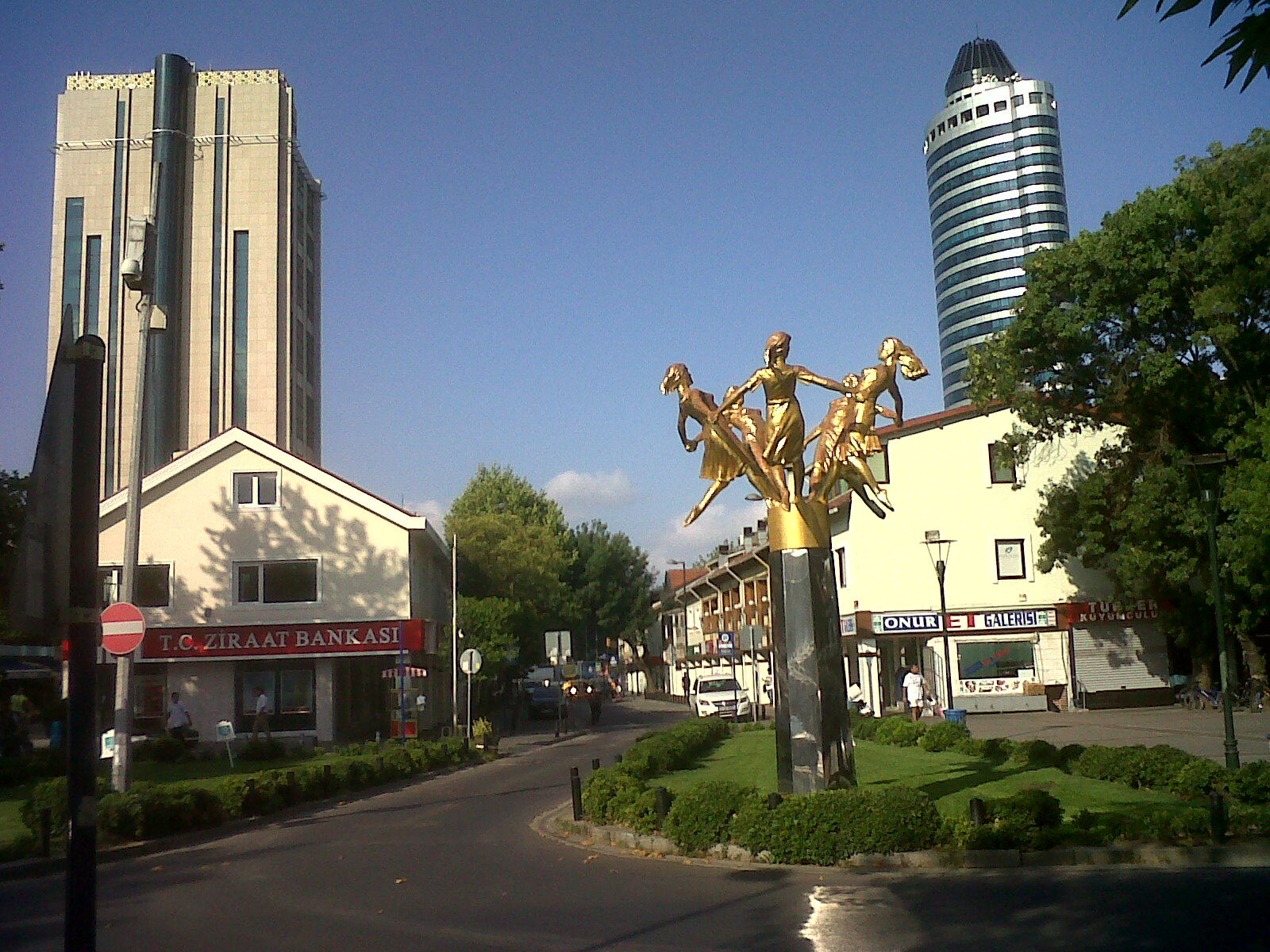
A view from Levent Çarşı

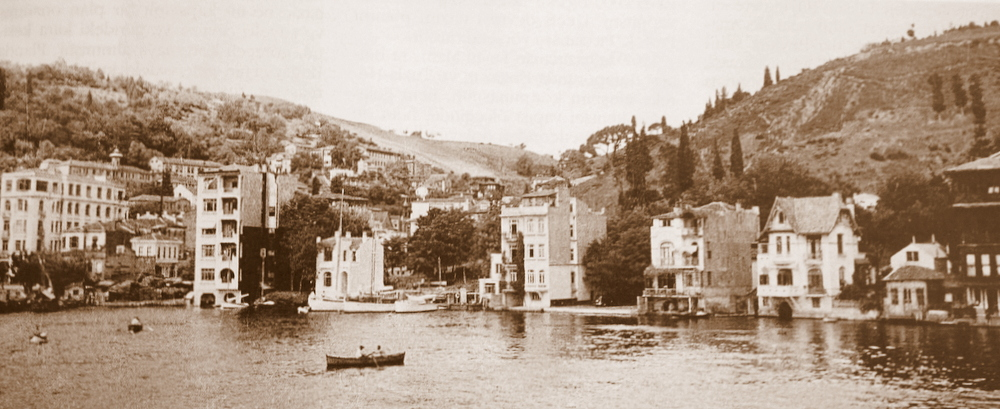
The Bebek coast in 1934

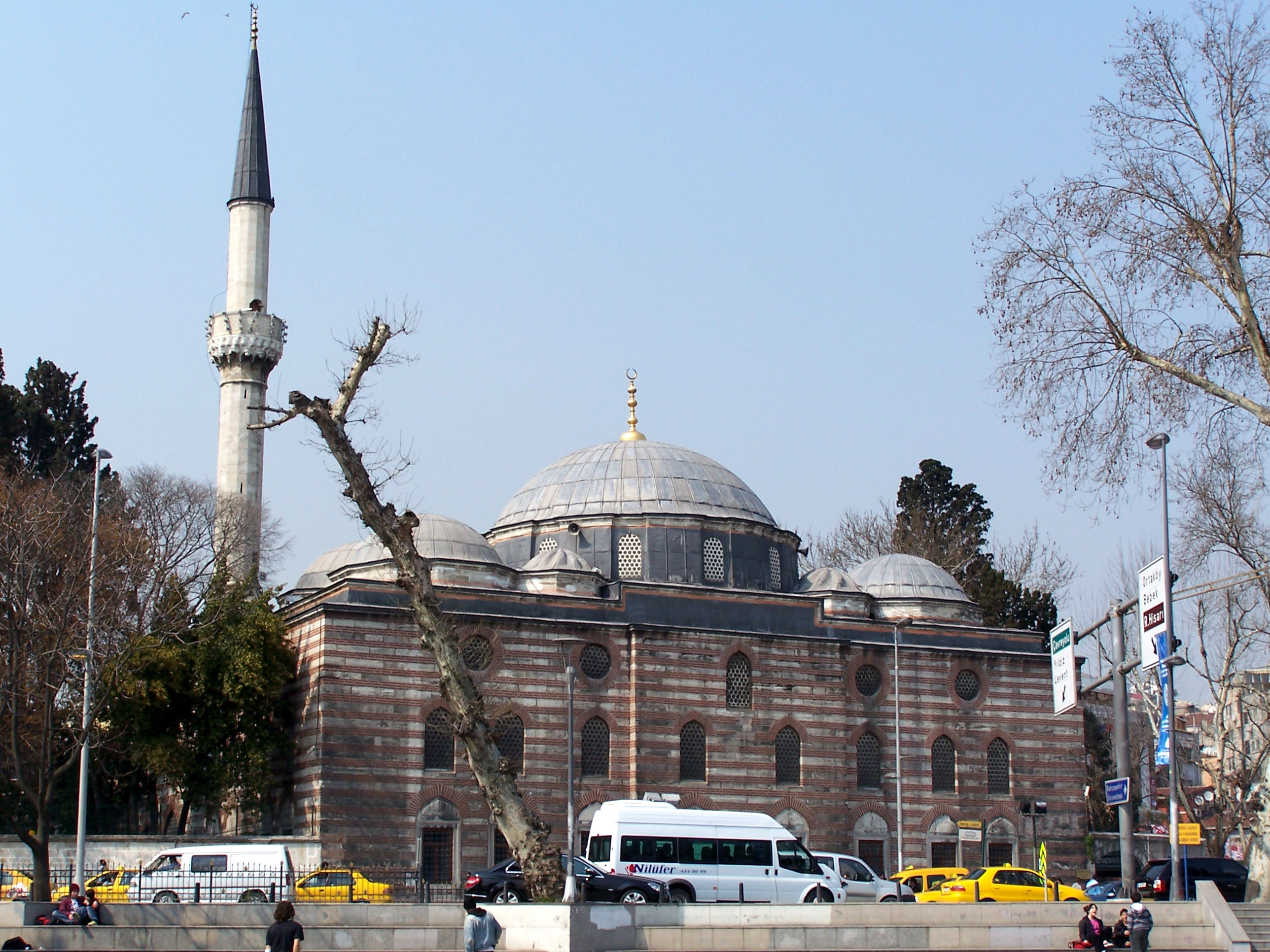
Sinan Pasha Mosque

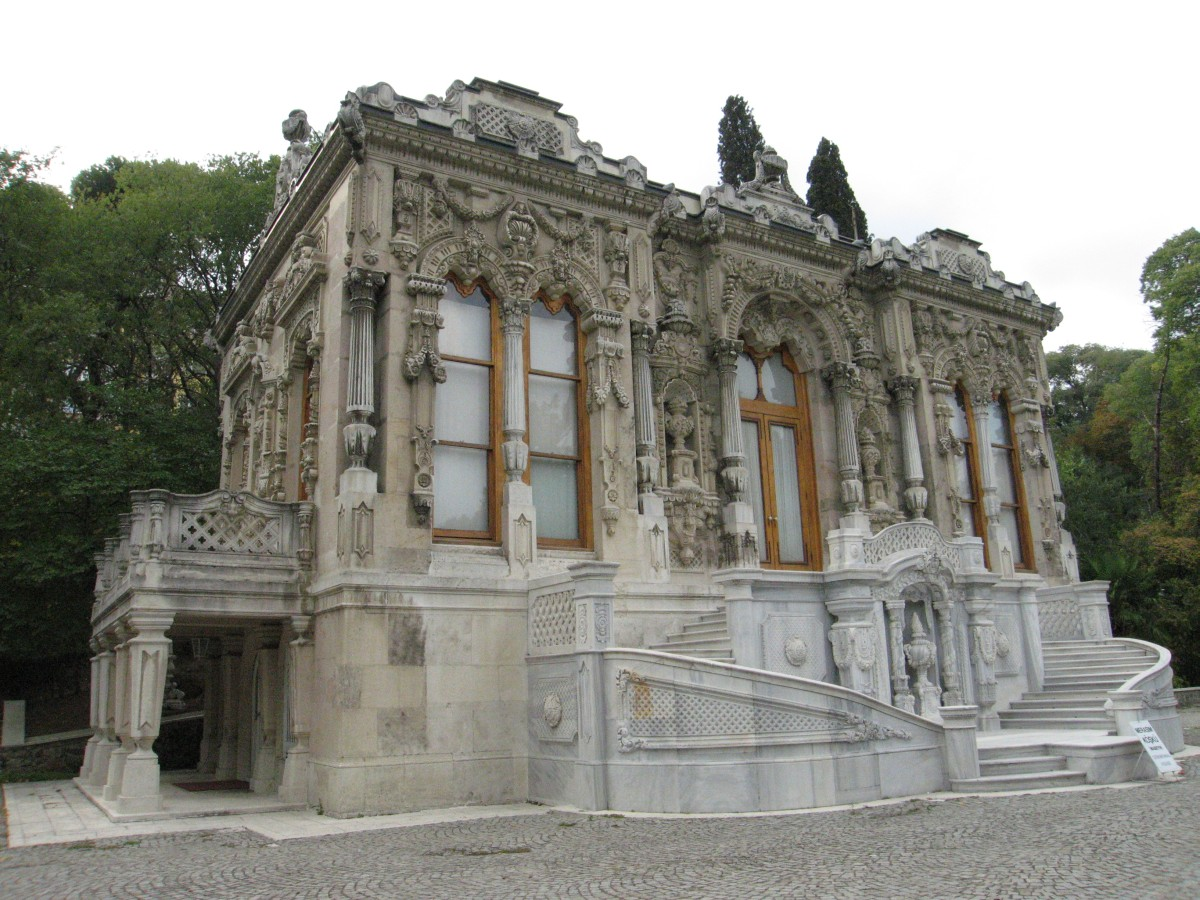
Ihlamur Palace

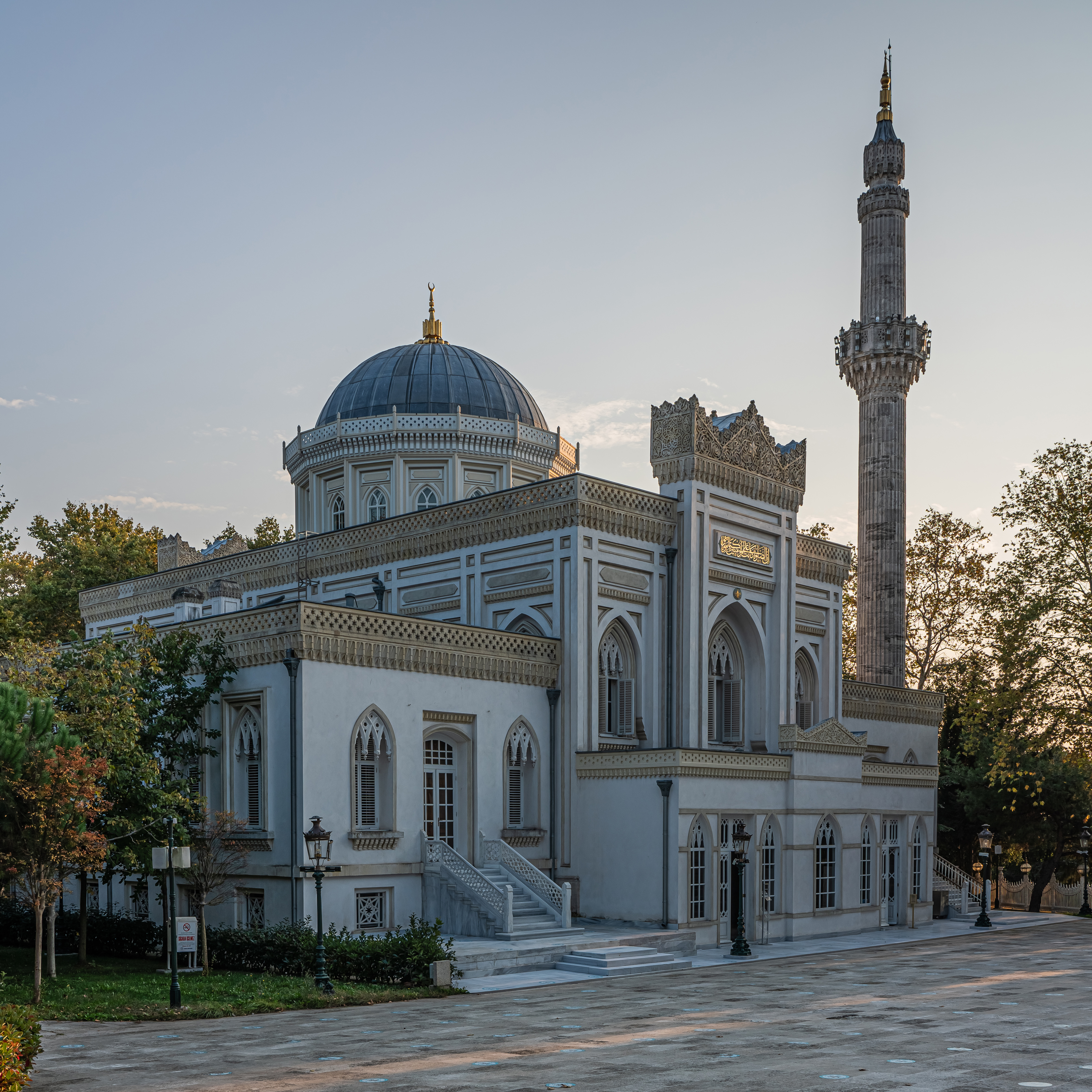
Yıldız Hamidiye Mosque

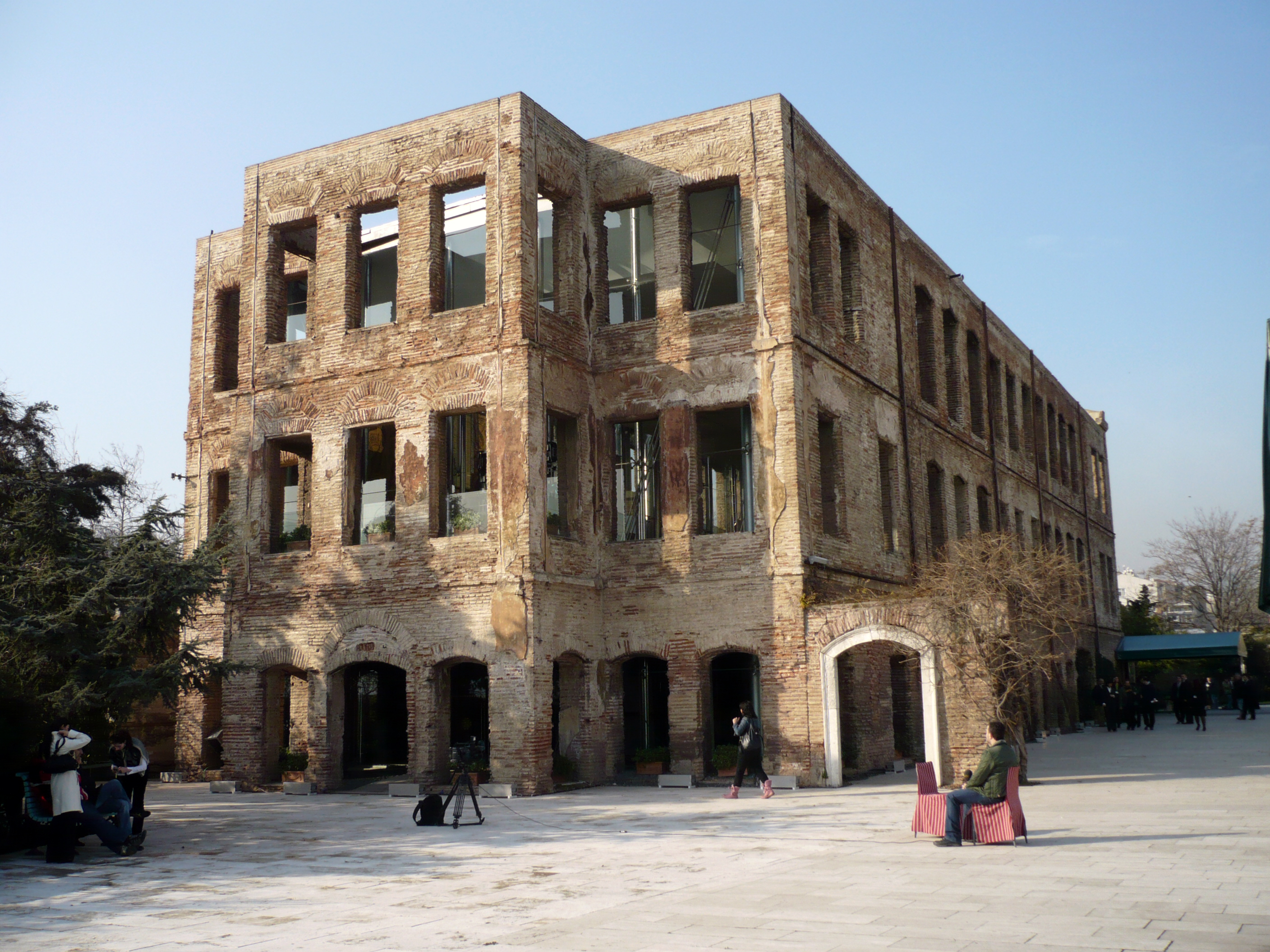
Esma Sultan Mansion

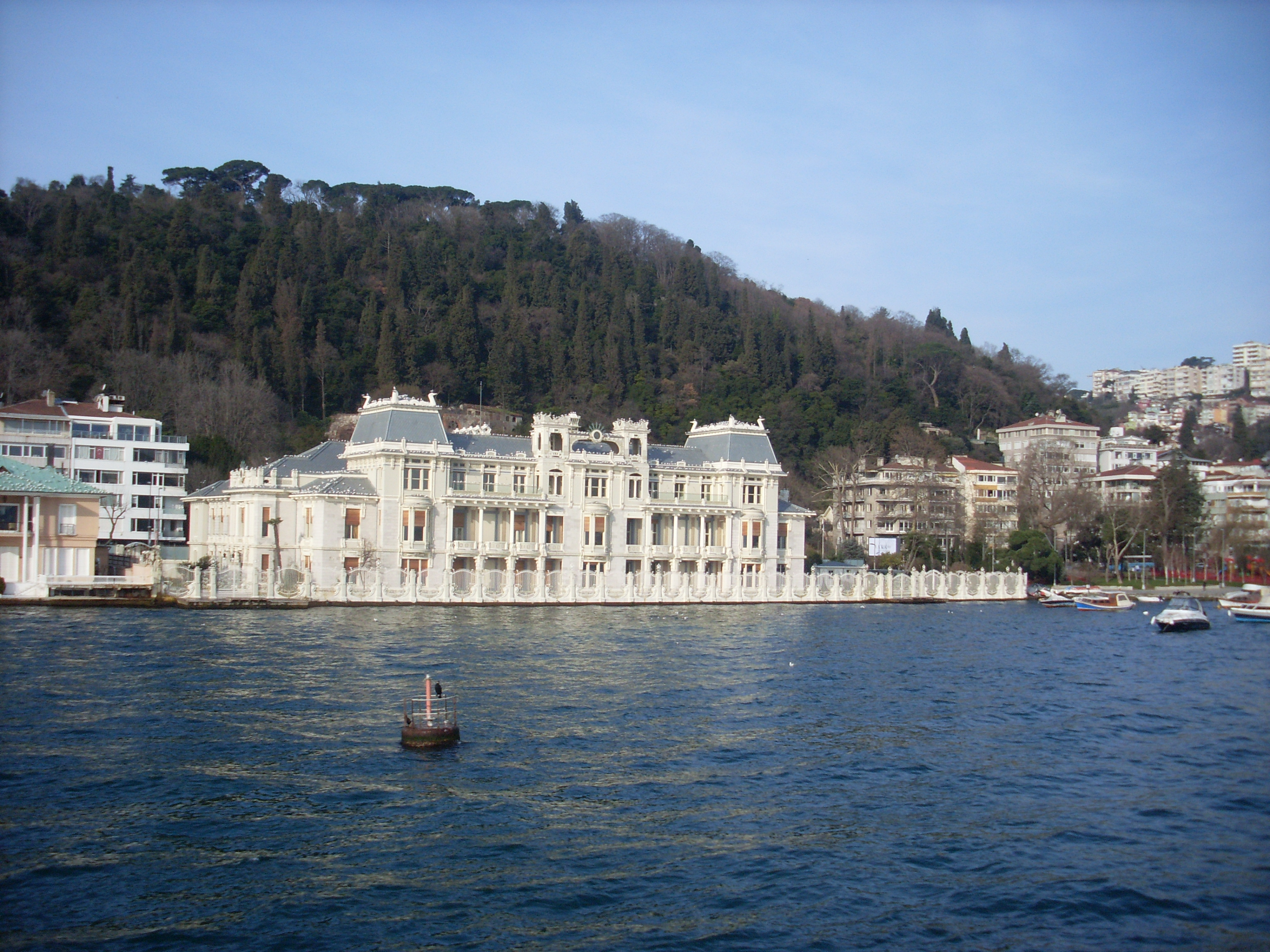
Hıdiva Mansion

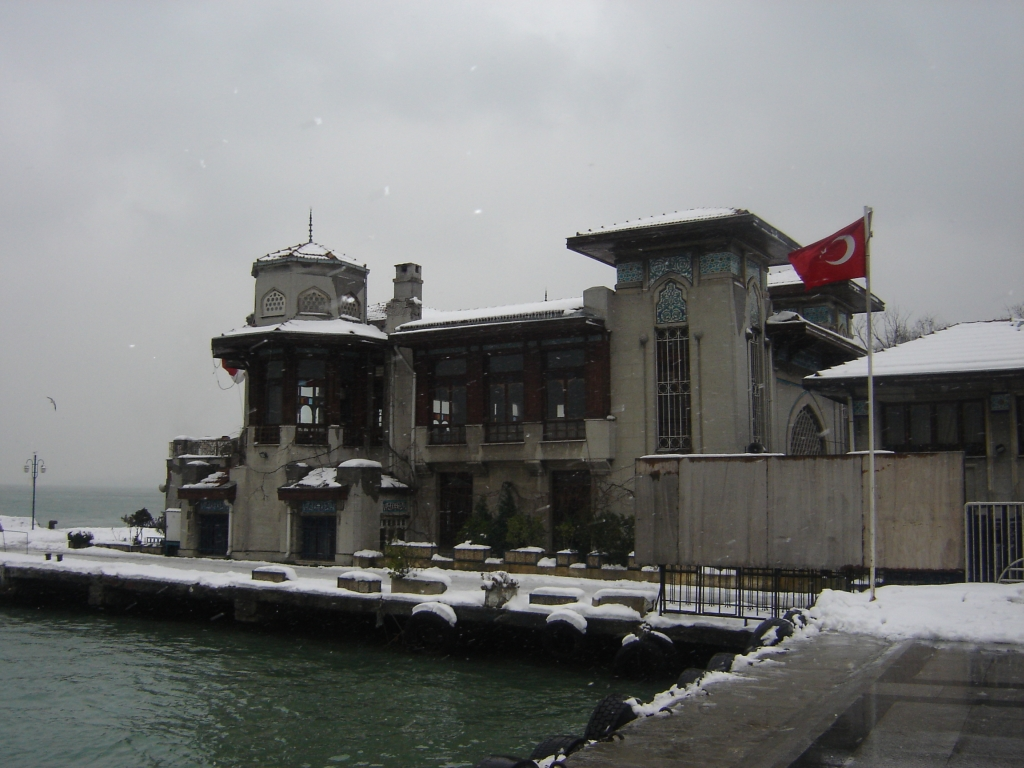
Barbarossa Hayreddin Pasha pier

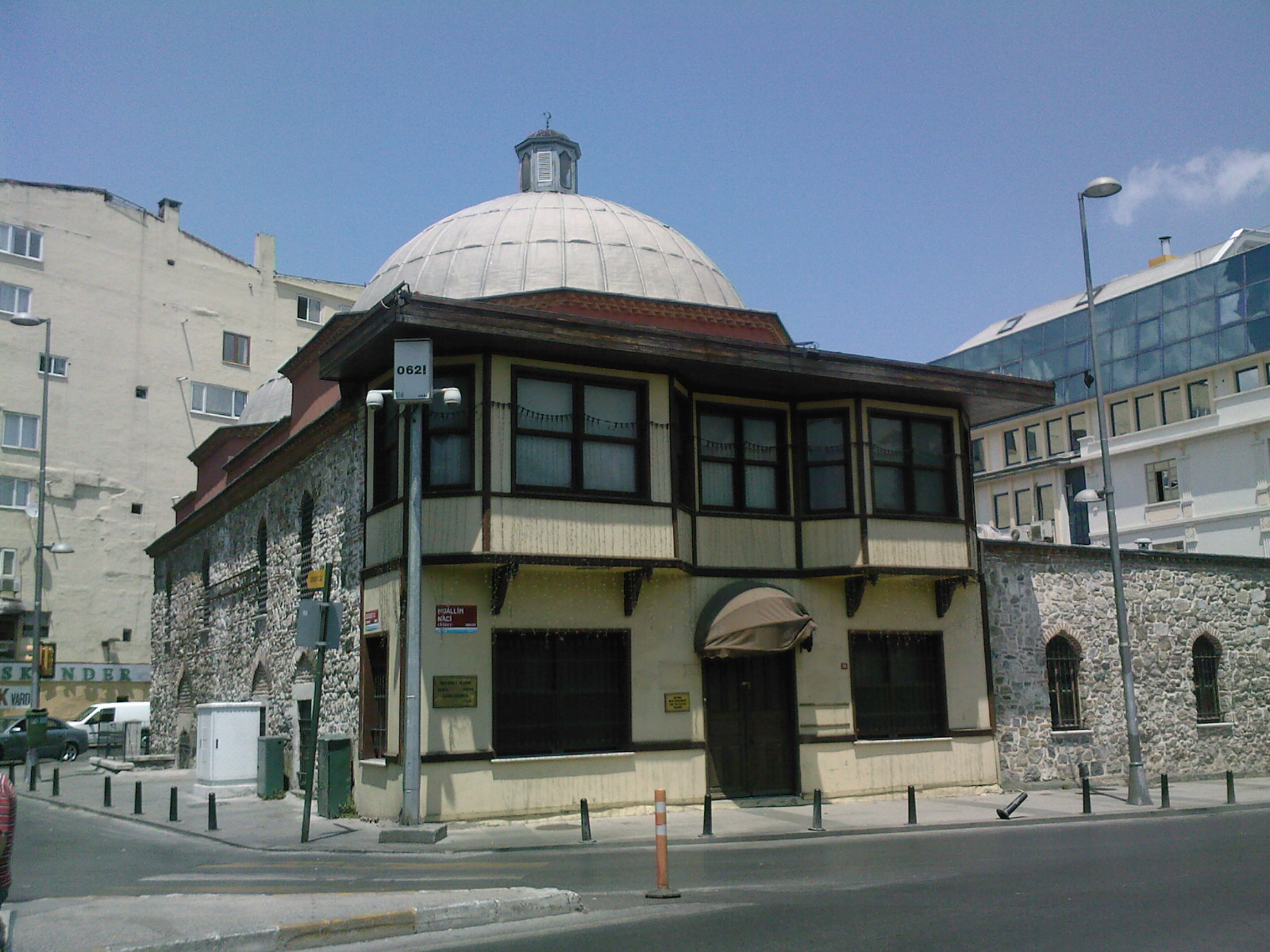
Ortaköy Kethuda Hammam

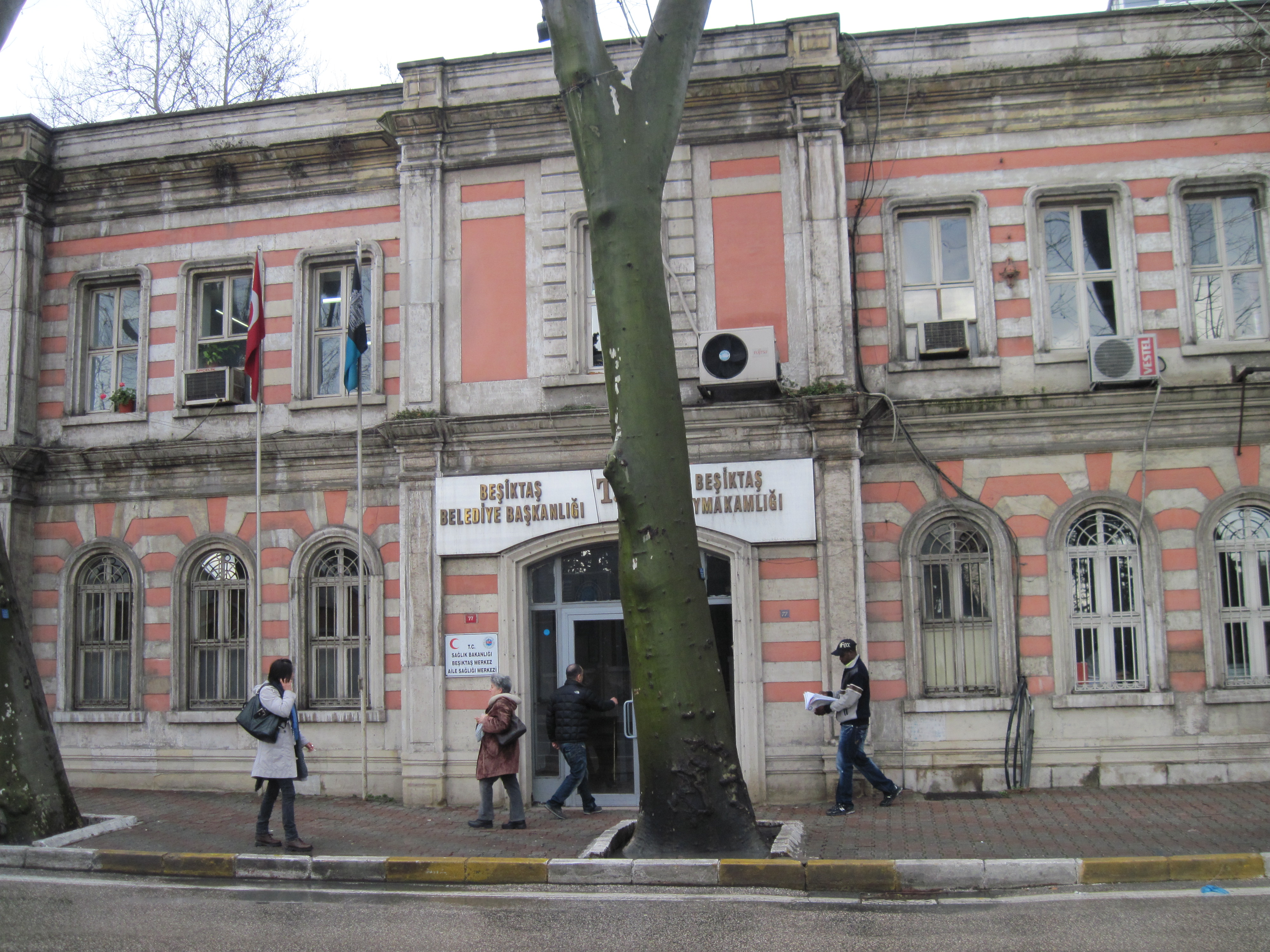
Beşiktaş Kaymakam and Municipality building

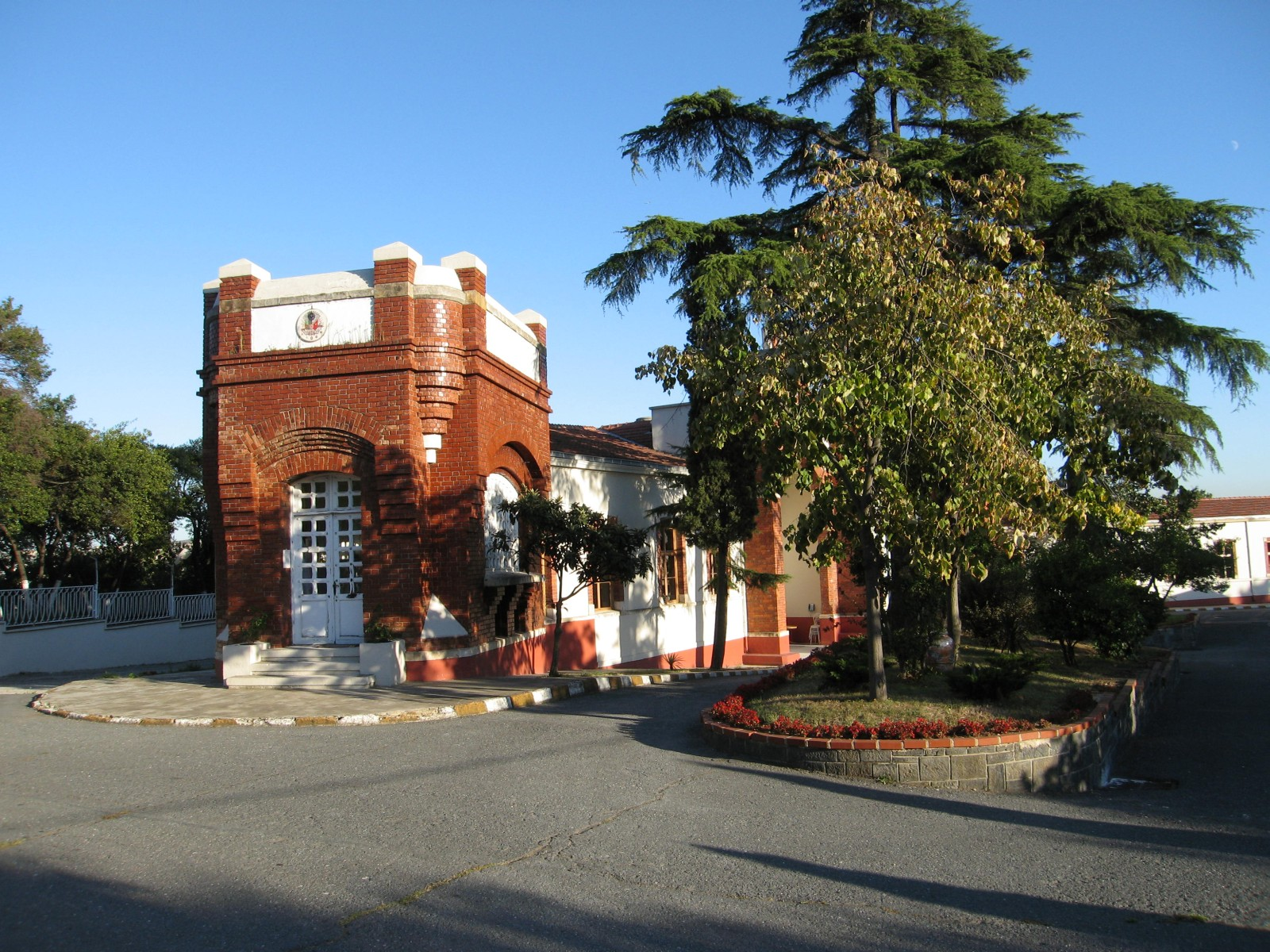
Yıldız Porcelain Factory

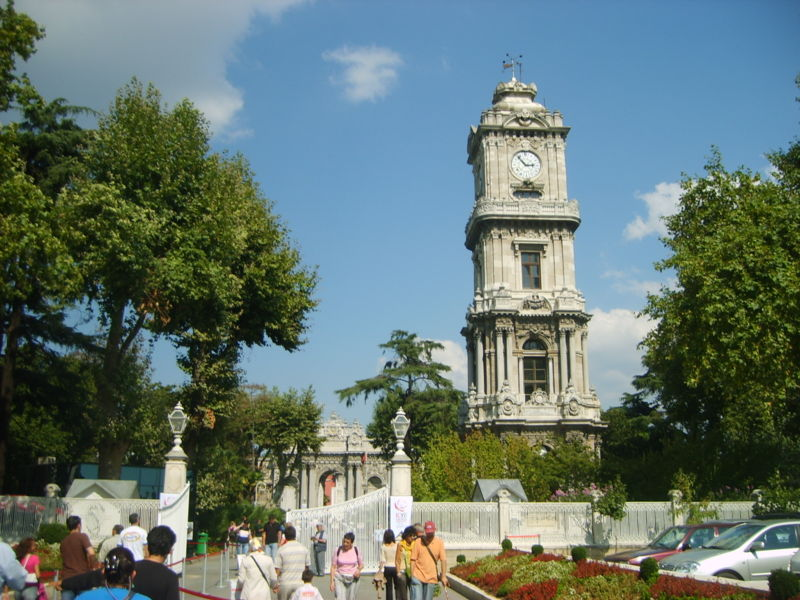
Dolmabahçe Clock Tower

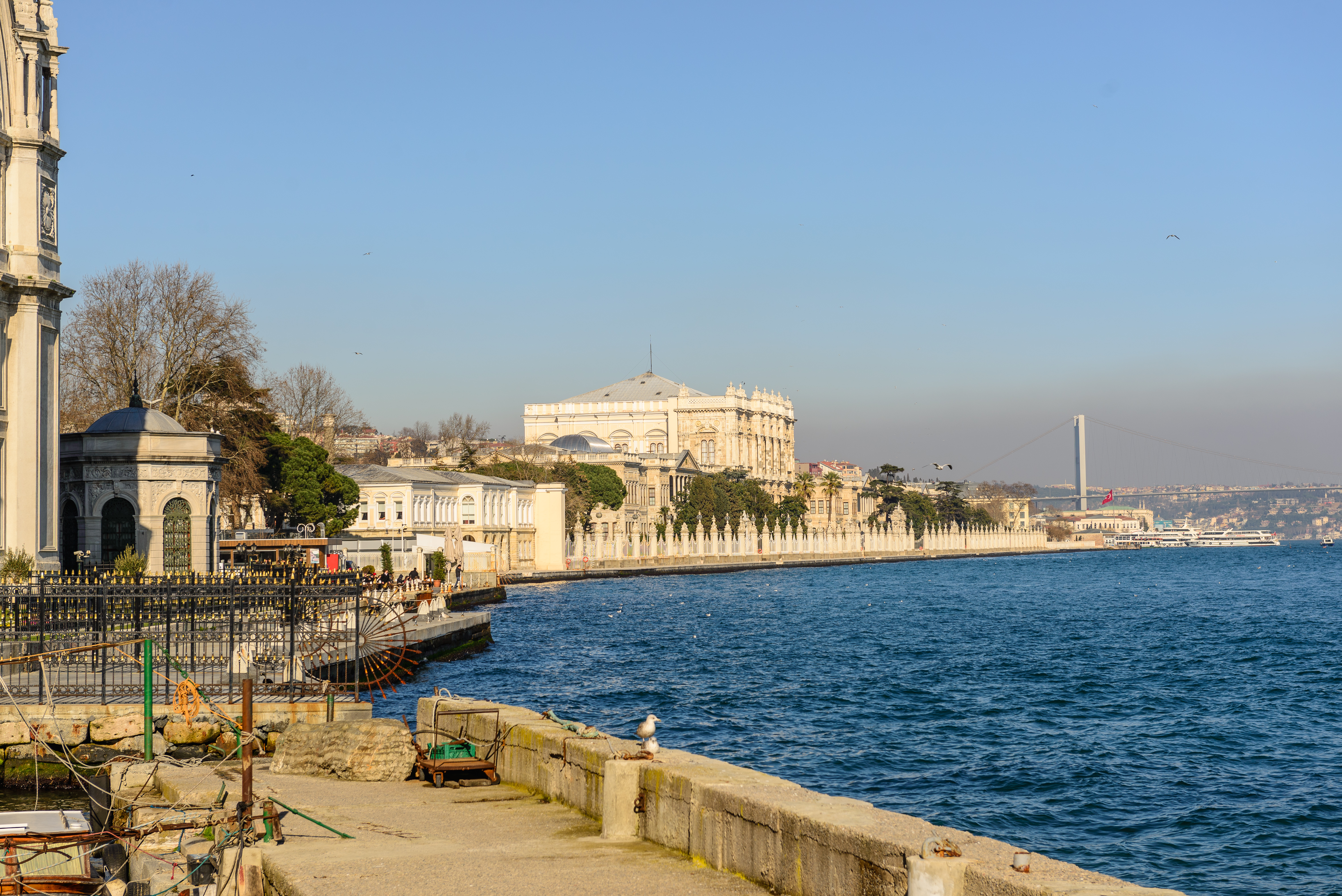
Dolmabahçe Mosque and Dolmabahçe Palace

=== Video gallery ===
View of Sinan Pasha Mosque and surrounding area from the Bosphorus, Barbarossa Hayreddin Pasha pier in foreground

View of Ortaköy from the Bosphorus, Ortaköy Mosque and the Bosphorus Bridge on the right

View of Arnavutköy and the Akıntıburnu lighthouse

View of the Aşiyan quarter and Aşiyan Asri Cemetery, with Rumelihisarı and the Fatih Sultan Mehmet Bridge on the right

Barbarossa Hayreddin Pasha pier and surrounding area
