= List of Istanbul Technical University rectors =

The first rector of Istanbul Technical University was Osman Tevfik Taylan. The incumbent president is Hasan Mandal.

== Presidents ==
President	Tenure	Area of specialty
Ord. Prof. Osman Tevfik Taylan	1944–1948	
Ord. Prof. Ahmet Hamdi Peynircioğlu	1948–1949	
Ord. Prof. Mustafa Hulki Erem	1949–1951; 1955–1956	Electrical engineering
Ord. Prof. Emin Halid Onat	1951–1953	Architecture
Prof. Ahmet Özel	1953–1954	Electrical engineering
Prof. Dr. Mustafa Santur	1954–1955	
Ord. Prof. İlhami Civaoğlu	1956–1957	Physics and chemistry
Prof. Dr. Mustafa İnan	1957–1959	Civil engineering
Prof. Dr. Fikret Narter	1959–1962	Mechanical engineering
Prof. Dr. M. Hikmet Binark	1962–1963	
Prof. Dr. M. Said Kuran	1963–1965	
Ord. Prof. Bedri Karafakıoğlu	1965–1969	Telecommunications engineering
Prof. Dr. Kazim Ergin	1969–1970	Geological engineering
Prof. Dr. Galip Sağıroğlu	1970–1974	
Prof. Dr. Kemal Kafalı	1974–1977; 1980–1987	
Prof. Dr. Nahit Kumbasar	1977–1980	Civil engineering
Prof. Dr. İlhan Kayan	1987–1992	Civil engineering
Prof. Dr. Reşat Baykal	1992-1996	
Prof. Dr. Gülsün Sağlamer	1996–2004	Architecture
Prof. Dr. Hüseyin Faruk Karadoğan	2004–2008	Civil engineering
Prof. Dr. Muhammed Şahin	2008–2012	Geodesy and photogrammetry engineering
Prof. Dr. Mehmet Karaca	2012–2020	Geological engineering
Prof. Dr. İsmail Koyuncu	2020–2024	Environmental engineering
Prof. Dr. Hasan Mandal	2024—	Metallurgical and materials engineering
