= Çarşı, Beşiktaş =

Place in Istanbul, Turkey

Coordinates: 41°02′38″N 29°00′18″E

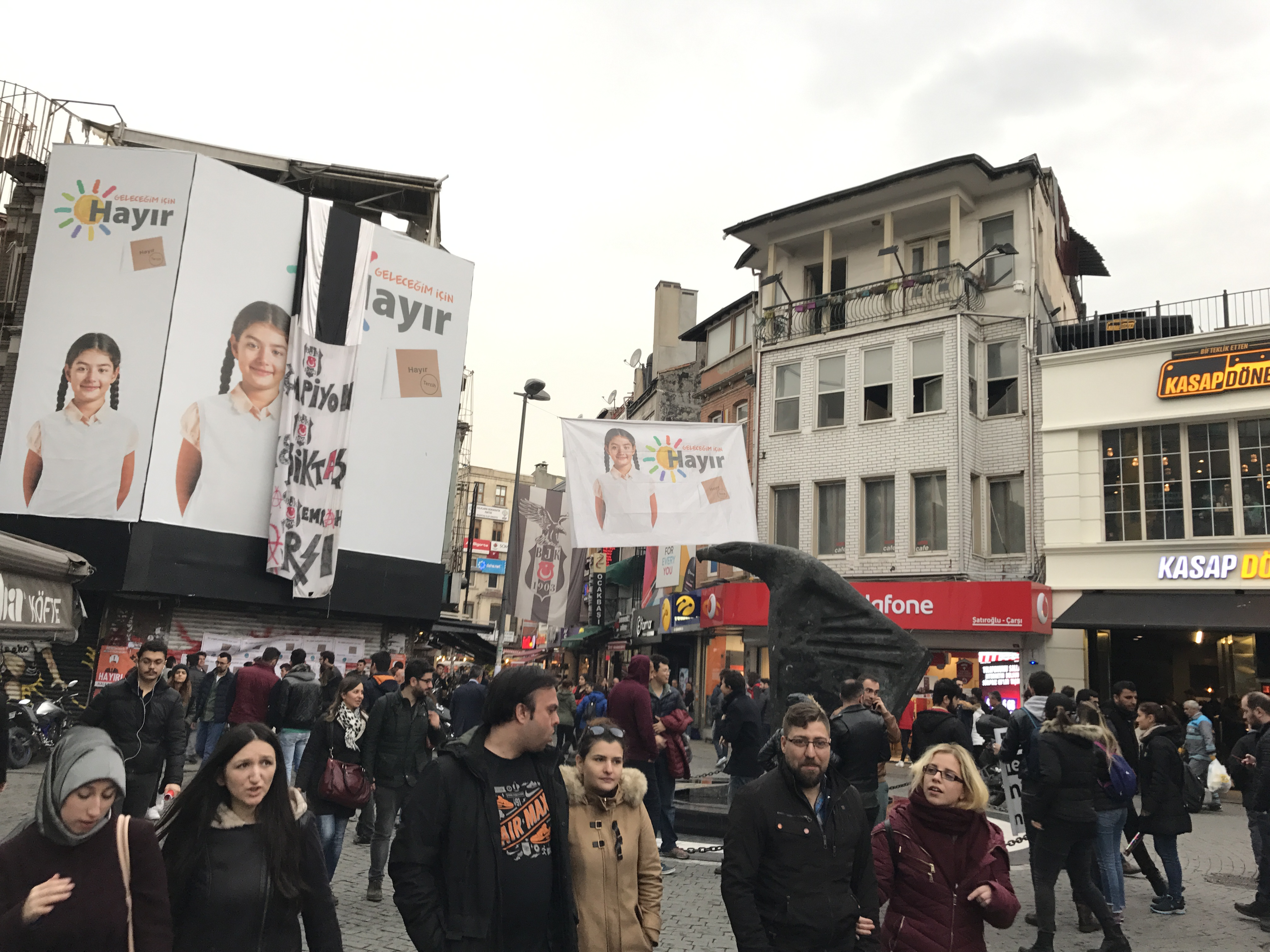

Çarşı (English: Marketplace) is the geographic center of the Beşiktaş municipality, a district on the European side of central Istanbul. The area is notable for being dominated by winding narrow streets that date to city's earliest ancient Hellenic roots.

As one of the main commercial districts of Istanbul, the Çarşı is known for its restaurants, meyhanes (pubs), döner stores, cafés, bakeries, patisseries, internet cafés and garment shops. There is a fish market and a farmers market organized daily. It is one of the centers of the Turkish youth culture. Many city-famous establishments are located in the area.

== History ==
The area was first developed in the 17th Century when a pleasure garden and several mansions were built there. After the relocation of the Ottoman dynasty to the Yıldız Palace, the area rapidly urbanized. This urbanization continued until the 1980s.

In the 16th century the area was known for its shipyard and Sinan Paşa was one of the admirals of the Ottoman navy, hence the name of the neighborhood.

== Geography ==
The area of Çarşı is delimited as follows:

- South: Bosphorus straight
- West: Ortabahçe Caddesi continuing as Ihlamur Caddesi
- North: southern edge of Abbasağa Parkı known as Şehit Kazım street
- East: Barbaros Boulevard

Today it is administered as part of the Sinanpaşa neighborhood.
