= Mehmet Karaca =

Turkish rector

Mehmet Karaca was the rector of Istanbul Technical University (ITU). He was born in Istanbul on 17 September 1957. He is a member of the Department of Geology and the Eurasia Institute of Earth Sciences at İstanbul Technical University. He is also head of Climate and Marine Sciences Group at Eurasia Institute of Earth Sciences. Following his graduation from Pertevniyal High School in Istanbul, he earned B.S. and M.S. degrees at the Department of Meteorology in the Faculty of Basic Sciences at ITU, in 1979 and 1981 respectively. He earned another M.S. degree at Department of Atmospheric and Oceanic Sciences of University of California, Los Angeles (UCLA). He earned a Ph.D. degree at Department of Atmospheric and Oceanic Sciences of University of California, Los Angeles (UCLA) in 1990.

After 1992, he has been working as faculty at Istanbul Technical University. He served as an assistant professor at ITU Faculty of Mining - Geology Department as an assistant professor (1992-1993), in Geology Department and Eurasia Institute of Earth Sciences between 1993 and 1999; and held the title of full professorship in Climate and Marine Sciences Department since 1997.

His research topics are Atmosphere and Ocean Modelling, Global and Regional Climate Change, Emergency and Disaster Management, Air Pollution and Air Quality and Urban Climate.

He is a member of American Geophysical Union, American Meteorological Society, National Geographic Society (USA) and WWF Turkey.
