= MEF International School Istanbul =

Location
- Ulus Mah. Öztopuz Cad. Leylak Sok. 34340 Ortaköy, Beşiktaş; Istanbul; Turkey; 41.0633°N 29.0237°E

Information
- Type: Private
- Motto: Building Bridges Between Countries and Cultures
- Established: 1998; 28 years ago
- Founder: Dr. Ibrahim Arıkan
- Principal: Ms. Lauren Henrietta Fajobi
- Head of school: Ms. Elvan Tongal
- Faculty: 63
- Grades: Pre-School to IB2 & Grade 12
- Enrollment: 300
- Schedule: Approx. 180 days
- Affiliation: CIS, IB and NEASC
- Website: mefis.k12.tr

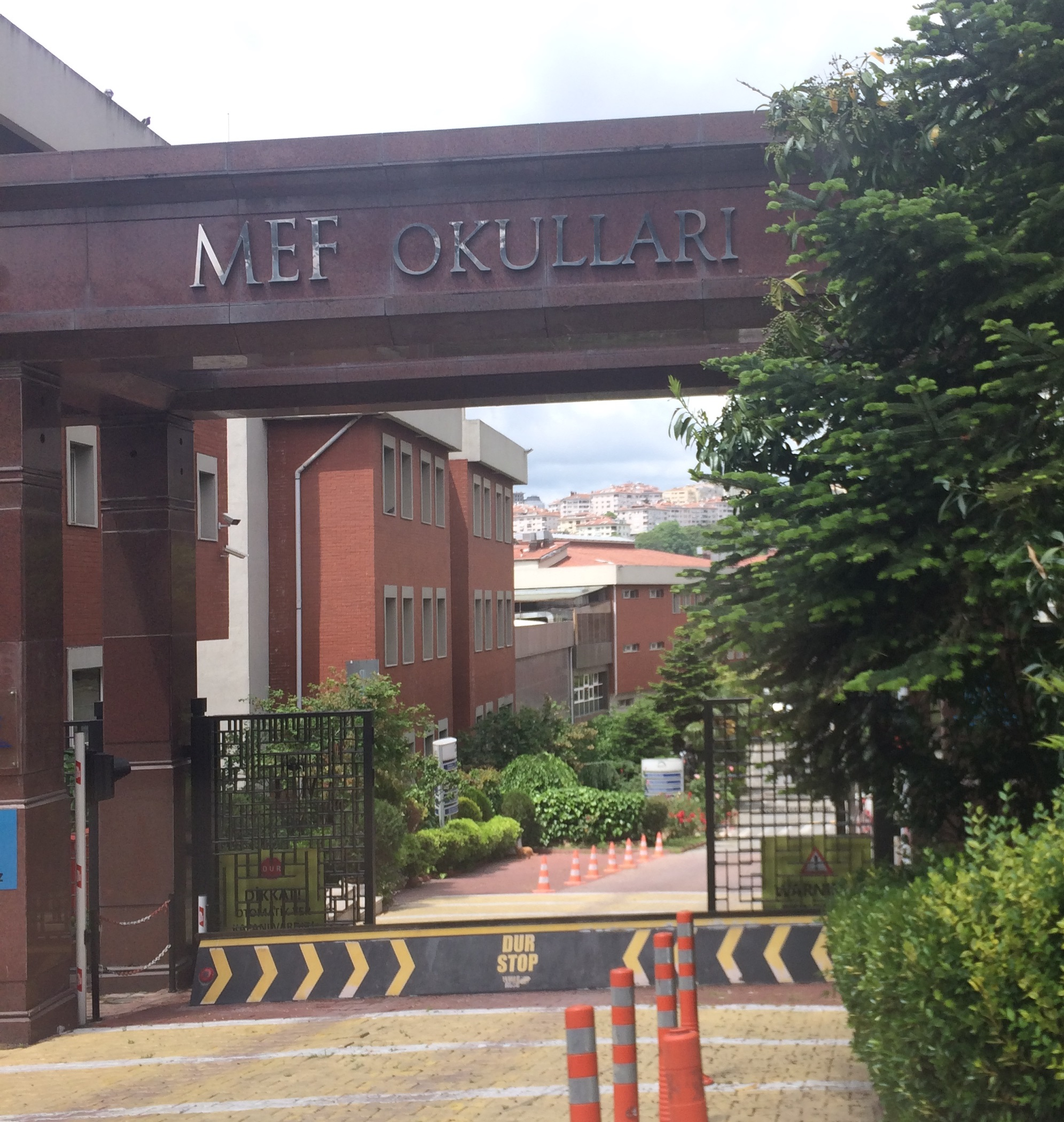
Entrance of the building

MEF International School (MEFIS) is a private international school in the Ortaköy district of Istanbul, Turkey. It was established in 1998 by Dr. Ibrahim Arikan. The enrollment is approximately 300 students of 52 nationalities from Preschool to Grade 12.

The MEF IS curriculum is centered mainly around the IB Primary Years Program, Cambridge Lower Secondary Checkpoint, Cambridge IGCSE, and IB Diploma Program. MEF IS has an English Language Learner support program for students who come to the school with limited or no English skills in Pre School - Grade 8. There is limited English Language Learner support available in grades 9-10.

== History ==
MEF IS was founded in 1998 by Dr. Ibrahim Arikan, a Turkish entrepreneur who heads various companies grouped under Arikanli Holding Inc.

MEF IS was created to provide English language education at the early years, elementary, middle and high school levels for the international community based in Istanbul.

== Curriculum ==
There are three separate curricula: IB PYP (Primary Years Program) for Preschool-Grade 5, Cambridge Lower Secondary Checkpoint for grades 6-8, Cambridge IGCSE for grades 9-10 and IB Diploma Program/IB Certificate for grades 11-12. All grade 12 graduates also receive an American High School diploma.

- At MEF International School there are approximately 300 students representing at least 50 cultures.
- In primary school, there is the IB PYP with fully transdisciplinary units of inquiry across all grade levels.
- In middle school there is Cambridge Lower Secondary Checkpoint curriculum for grades 6-8.
- In grades 9-10, students follow the Cambridge IGCSE. In grades 11-12 students follow the IB Diploma Program or the IB Course Certificates in selected subjects along with earning an American High School diploma accredited by the New England Association of Schools and Colleges (NEASC).
- The IB program at MEF International School started in 1998.
- MEF International School is fully accredited by the Council of International Schools (CIS) and the New England Association of Schools and Colleges (NEASC)

=== Science ===
The MEF IS science program places an emphasis on exploring the transdisciplinary nature of science to understand natural phenomena and how they apply to theoretical and real-world applications. All students develop a firm foundation in scientific inquiry and the core scientific disciplines: biology, chemistry, and physics. This approach enables students to better understand the technological world in which they live, and take an informed interest in science and scientific developments. Students learn about the biology, chemistry, and physics through a mix of theoretical and practical studies. Students can further their study in these subjects in the IB Diploma Program in grades 11 and 12.

=== Arts ===
Throughout the year, students' artwork is showcased in ongoing art exhibits around the school. In the Primary School, Visual Arts and Performing Arts are fully integrated into every unit of inquiry. Students choose a form of artistic expression for one of their learning products tied to the central concept of the unit of inquiry. In the Secondary School, grades 6-8, 9-10, and IBDP, there are smaller exhibitions and performances held throughout the school year to showcase student talent, growth, and reflection. Each child selects artwork to display across different mediums of artistic expression along with an artist's statement for the community to appreciate and reflect upon.

=== Sports ===
MEF IS offers soccer, badminton, basketball, volleyball, tennis, swimming, cross country, table tennis, dodge ball, handball, swimming gala, and sports day. The school has a swimming pool that is shared with the National School. Secondary School PE lessons are typically held in the Big Gym or the Bubble Gym. Primary School PE lessons are typically held in the Blue Gym, Green Gym, or Grey Gym. Students in Pre School - grade 10 enjoy 2 PE lessons per week.

== Library and technology ==
The MEF IS library provides curriculum support and meets the recreational reading needs for the whole school from Pre-School and PYP program to the IB Diploma.

== Student activities ==
=== Athletics ===
Physical education in primary school is an integral part of the IB Primary Years Programme (IB PYP). Its purpose is to develop a combination of transferable skills promoting personal, social and physical development; to encourage present and help future choices that contribute to long-term healthy living; and to understand the cultural significance of physical activities for individuals and communities.

In grades 5-12, students have access to competitive sports matches, competitions and tournaments since MEF IS is a member of the Turkish Internationals Schools League (TISL). Students in grades 5-12 compete against other international schools across Turkey. Students identify and develop appropriate skills and strategies when playing a variety of team sports. These games vary from simple, organization games for the primary grades to football, basketball, and volleyball for the upper primary classes. Students recognize the importance of teamwork; identifying and developing appropriate skills and strategies; recognizing the importance of rules and how they define the nature of a game; modifying existing games and creating new games.

=== Clubs ===
The clubs for Primary School change from year to year based on teacher and student interests. Some of the most popular clubs include: Ballet, Ceramics, Mad Science, Sculpture, Lego Robotics, Construction, Modern dance, Guitar/Piano, Movie Making, Yoga, Chess, Running & Fitness, Fashion Design, Modern Dance/Tap, So Lets Sew, Film Club, Code Monkey, Violin, Green Club, and Drama.

The clubs for Secondary School change from year to year based on teacher and student interests. Some of the clubs include: MEF IS News, Model United Nations, Model European Parliament, Math Olympiad, Student Council, World Scholars Cup, Ceramics, Open Art Studio, Basketball, Environmental Sustainability, Football, Volleyball, Table Tennis, Coding, and Robotics.

== People ==
In MEF IS, the population of students is around 300 students, with around 52 nationalities.

=== Faculty and staff ===
MEF International School's teachers come from all over the world. The most common nationalities are American, Canadian, British and Spanish. The Early Childhood Center has its own building and playground for Pre School, Pre Kindergarten, and Kindergarten students. The Primary School, Grades 1-5, is situated on the first three floors of the building. The Secondary School, Grades 6-12 are on the upper two floors. The Primary School includes a Visual Arts studio, Performing Arts room, the Blue Gym/Ballet Studio, MEF IS Tech, and the Whole School Library, which houses a rich collection of books and electronic resources for students and families.

The Secondary School also has a fully networked computer lab, Middle School Science Lab, Chemistry Lab, Biology Lab, Physics, abs studio, Performing Arts room, and canteen for smaller performances and purchasing a range of drinks, snacks and sandwiches.

== See also ==
- MEF University
- MEF International School Izmir
