= MEF University =

Private university in Maslak, Sarıyer, İstanbul, Turkey

- Type: Private
- Established: 2012; 14 years ago
- Rector: Prof. Dr. Muhammed Şahin
- Location: Maslak, Sarıyer, Istanbul, Turkey; 41.1089°N 29.0085°E
- Colors: Blue Red
- Website: www.mef.edu.tr/en

MEF University is a non-profit private university in Istanbul, founded by the İbrahim Arıkan Education and Scientific Research Foundation. It opened in the academic year 2014–2015. It is the first university in the world to adopt the "flipped classroom" educational model university-wide. MEF University is one of only eight universities in Turkey that have the ABET accreditation. It has received accreditation for all engineering departments. It was granted Full Accreditation for a period of five years by the Higher Education Quality Council (YÖKAK) in March 2025.

== History ==
MEF Educational Institutions were first established in 1972, when the MEF Tutoring Schools were established. MEF University was established by the İbrahim Arıkan Education and Scientific Research Foundation.

== Faculties, departments and schools ==
MEF University's medium of education is English, with the exception of the School of Law which is 30% in English.

=== Faculties ===
==== Faculty of Education ====
- Mathematics Education
- English Language Education
- Guidance and Psychological Counseling

==== Faculty of Law ====
- Law

==== Faculty of Economics, Administrative and Social Sciences ====
- Economy
- Business Administration
- Political Science and International Relations
- Psychology
- Management Information Systems

==== Faculty of Engineering ====
- Computer Engineering
- Electrical-Electronics Engineering
- Industrial Engineering
- Civil Engineering
- Mechanical Engineering
- Artificial Intelligence Engineering

==== Faculty of Art, Design and Architecture ====
- Digital Game Design
- Architecture
- Interior Design

== Educational method ==
MEF University has adopted the "flipped classroom" educational method university-wide.
