= Muhammed Şahin =

Turkish academic (born 1965)

Muhammed Şahin (born December 10, 1965 in Pazar, Rize) is a Turkish academic. He is the former rector of Istanbul Technical University (2008-2012), and the founding rector of MEF University (2013 – present).

He studied at Pazar Sivritepe Village Primary School, Pazar Secondary School and Pazar High School, He graduated from the Department of Geodesy and Photogrammetry (Geomatics) Engineering, Faculty of Civil Engineering, Istanbul Technical University in 1987. Şahin received his master's degree from University College London 1991, and his PhD degree from University of Newcastle upon Tyne in 1994.

== Career ==
He started his academic career in 1998 as a Research Fellow in the Department of Surveying Techniques at Istanbul Technical University and advanced through the ranks of assistant professor and associate professor. In 2002, he became a tenured Professor in the Department of Surveying Techniques there. He was a short-term visiting fellow at Graz University of Technology in 1997 and at Technische Universität Berlin in 2000.

From 1996-2004, he served in administrative positions such as Advisor to the Rector, Director of the School of Foreign Languages, Chairman of the Department of Surveying Techniques and Coordinator for the Graduate Program in Advanced Technologies.

Şahin is a member of various national and international engineering societies and published 14 international SCI articles and 73 international papers.

Şahin was appointed Rector of Istanbul Technical University on August 6, 2008 and served until August 6, 2012. In 2009, Şahin was the first rector from Turkey to be elected as a member of the Board of Directors of CESAER (Conference of European Schools for Advanced Engineering Education and Research). In February 2012, Şahin was elected unanimously to the four-member Executive Board of CESAER.

Şahin is a member of the Advisory Board on Earthquakes of the Prime Ministry Disaster and Emergency Management Presidency, and a member of the Board of Directors of Foundation for Citizens from Rize and Black Sea Region. From August 2008 to August 2012, he was the Chairman of ITU Foundation and ITU Development Foundation, Chairman of ITU ARI Technocity Board of Directors, Founding Representative of ITU Development Foundation Schools and an Honorary Chairman of ITU Alumni Council.

== Publications ==
Şahin has co-authored three books on flipped learning with the director of the Center for Research and Best Practices in Learning and Teaching at MEF University, Dr. Caroline Fell Kurban: The Flipped Approach to Higher Education: Designing Universities for Today's Knowledge Economies and Societies; The New University Model: Scaling Flipped Learning for Higher Ed - An Insanely Simple Guide; The New University Model: Flipped, Adaptive, Digital and Active Learning - A Future Perspective

== Personal life ==
Muhammed Şahin is married to Neşe Şahin, a textile designer. They have a son named Efe and a daughter named Defne.
