= Meyhane =

Traditional bar in south-eastern Europe

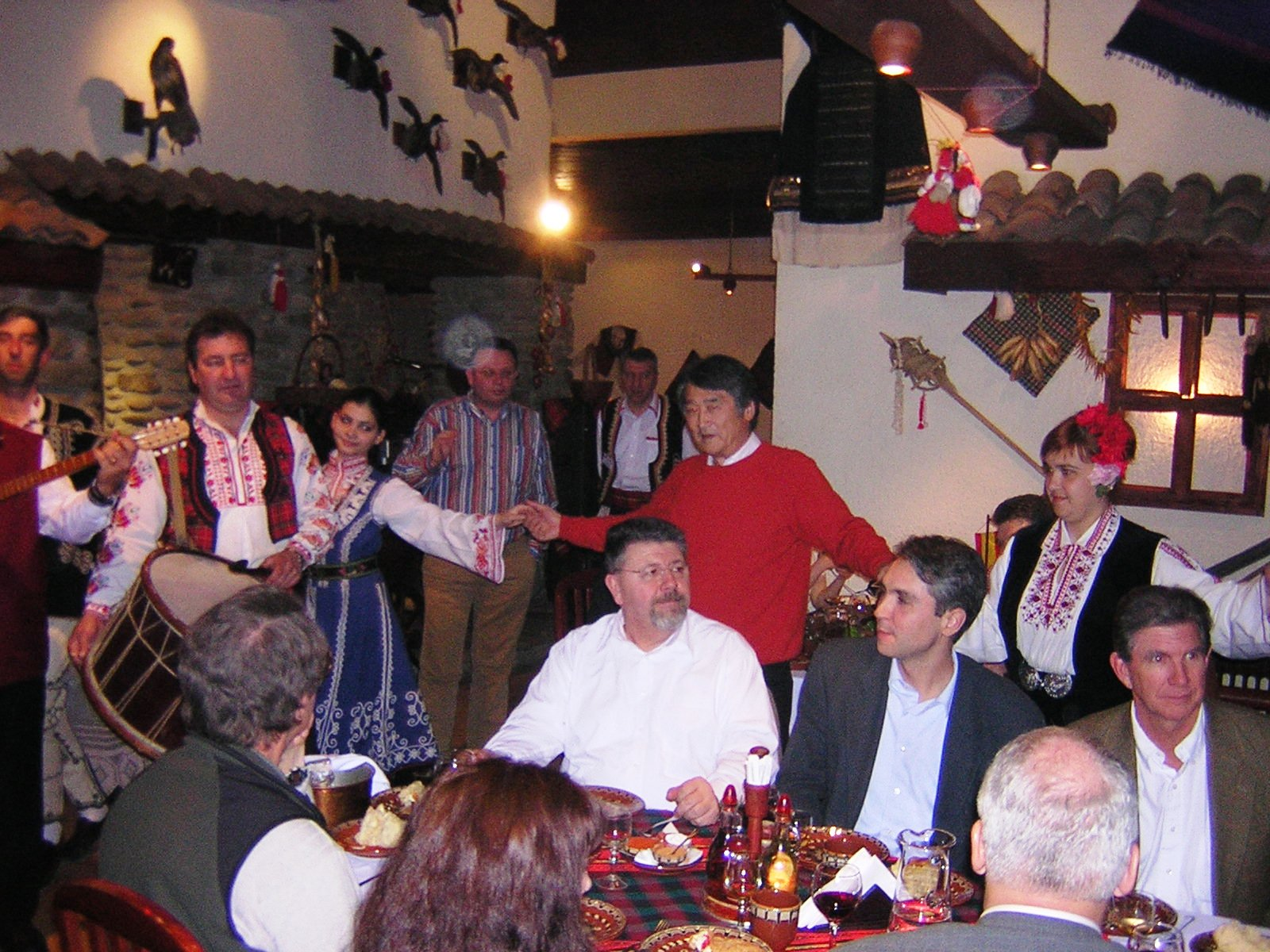
People dancing in a Bulgarian mehana

A meyhane or pothouse (from Persian: میخانه, romanized: meykhaneh) is a traditional restaurant or bar in Turkey, Balkans, Azerbaijan and Iran. It serves alcoholic beverages like wine, rakı, vodka, or beer, with meze and traditional foods.

== Etymology ==
Meyhane means "wine house" and is composed of two Persian words: mey (wine) and khāneh (house).

The word entered the Serbian and Bulgarian languages as mehana (механа) and in Macedonian as meana (меана). In the Bosnian language, the word mejhana is used. In Serbian, the word mehana is considered archaic, while in Bulgarian, it refers to a restaurant with traditional food, decoration, and music.

== Ottoman Empire ==
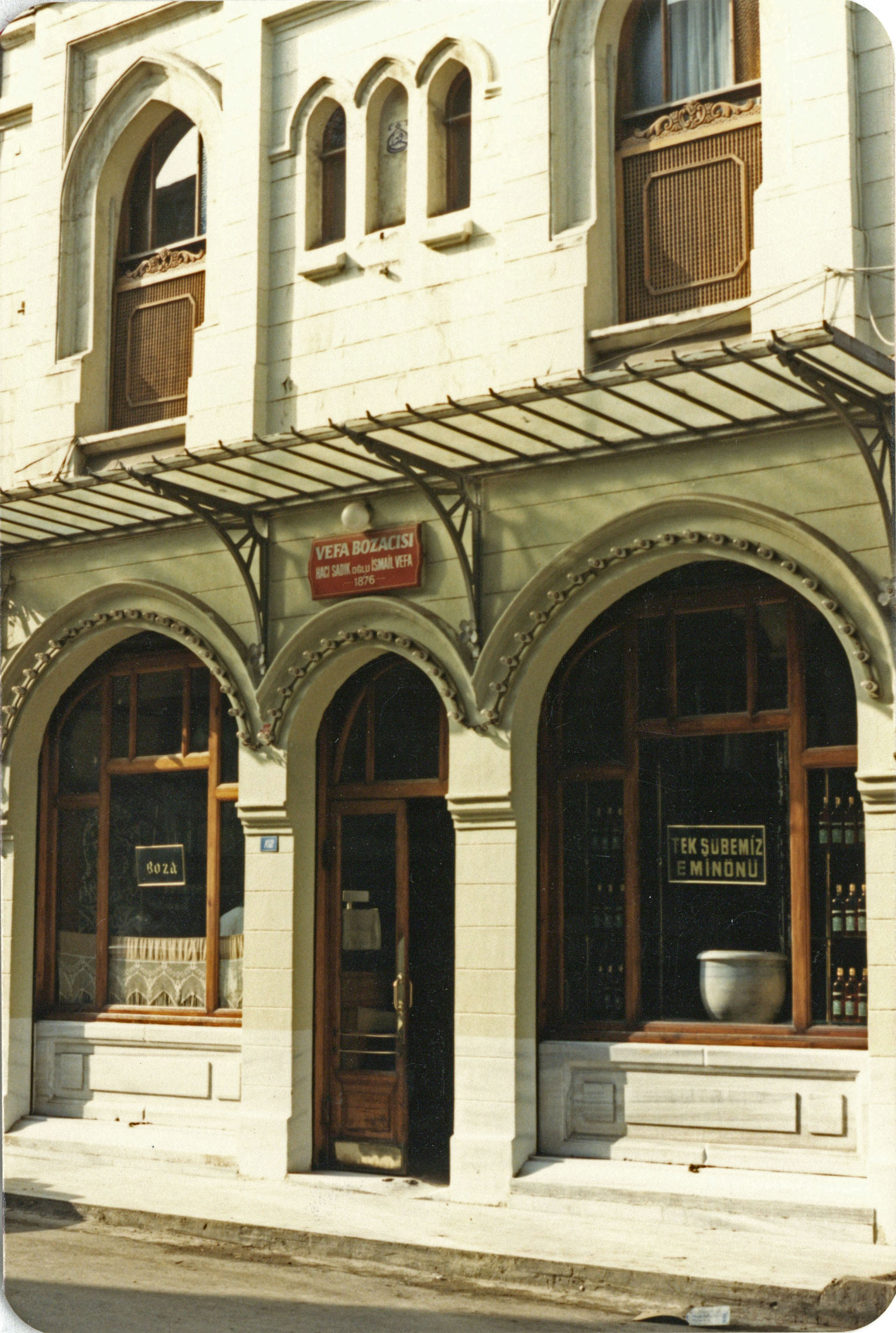
Vefa Bozacısı in Istanbul established in 1876

Meyhane (Lisān-ı Osmānī: ميخانه, meyhâne) appeared during the time of the Ottoman Empire and rapidly increased in popularity, becoming an institution that housed all kinds of people from different segments of society. In the beginning of the 1800s meyhane in Istanbul numbered around 500.

Tatar boza, fermented with opium and containing a lot of alcohol, has been one of the most important drinks in the Ottoman Empire for centuries, and it was only at the end of the 18th century that non-alcoholic sweet boza became widespread instead of sour boza.

— Yalçın (2017)

During the reign of Selim the Grim alcohol consumption in the Ottoman Empire increased particularly and meyhane started to appear more regularly as separate buildings built from masonry, with arched windows and doors and earth floors.

=== Historical descriptions ===
Ottoman journalist Basiretçi Ali Efendi (1838–1912) has described the Golden Horn coast and especially the meyhane around Balat in the beginning of the 1800s.

Author Sadri Sema (1880–1964) describes the pub culture in Istanbul in the beginning of the 1900's as follows:

O devirde insanlara dünyanın varlığını yokluğunu unutturan, ‘İç bâde, sev güzel var ise akl-ı şuurun’ masalıyla, halis sakız, enfes Martel, üzüm kızı, yıllanmış şarap, kazan ortası Frenk, Marmara şartozu, süzme menta mavalıyla zehir gibi ispirto yutturan meyhanelerden beş on isim:

Sirkeci’de paket postanesinin yerinde iki bacağı karada, dört bacağı denizde salaş meyhaneler, Babıâli caddesinde Steinbruch, Kafkas birahaneleri, Tavukpazarı, İskender boğazı, Balıkpazarı meygedeleri. Yedikule demgedeleri, sur dışında Mazaros’un çakmakçurhanesi, Bakırköy, Sakızağacı, Zeytinlik gazinoları... Beyoğlu’nda Strazburg, Kristal, Aftaloyos, Santral, cem ve dem-âbâdları...

Çalgı ve çakıntı ile karışık ve karmaşık takıntı yerleri.

[A few names of pubs that served people spirits that made people forget the existence of the world like 'İç bâde, sev güzel var ise akl-ı şuurun' story, halis sakız, enfes Martel, üzüm kızı, yıllanmış şarap, kazan ortası Frenk, Marmara şartozu, süzme menta mavalıyla zehir are:

In Sirkeci, shabby taverns with two legs on land and four legs on the sea at the place of the parcel post office, Steinbruch on Babıali street, Caucasian pubs, Tavukpazarı, İskender strait, Balıkpazarı ravines. The landmarks of Yedikule, the lighters of Mazaros outside the city walls, the casinos of Bakırköy, Sakızağacı, Zeytinlik... Strasbourg, Kristal, Aftaloyos, Santral, cem and dem-âbâds in Beyoğlu...

Popular places mixed with instruments and rattles.]

— Sadri Sema
