= Zorlu Center =

Multiuse complex in Istanbul, Turkey

Coordinates: 41°4′0″N 29°1′1″E

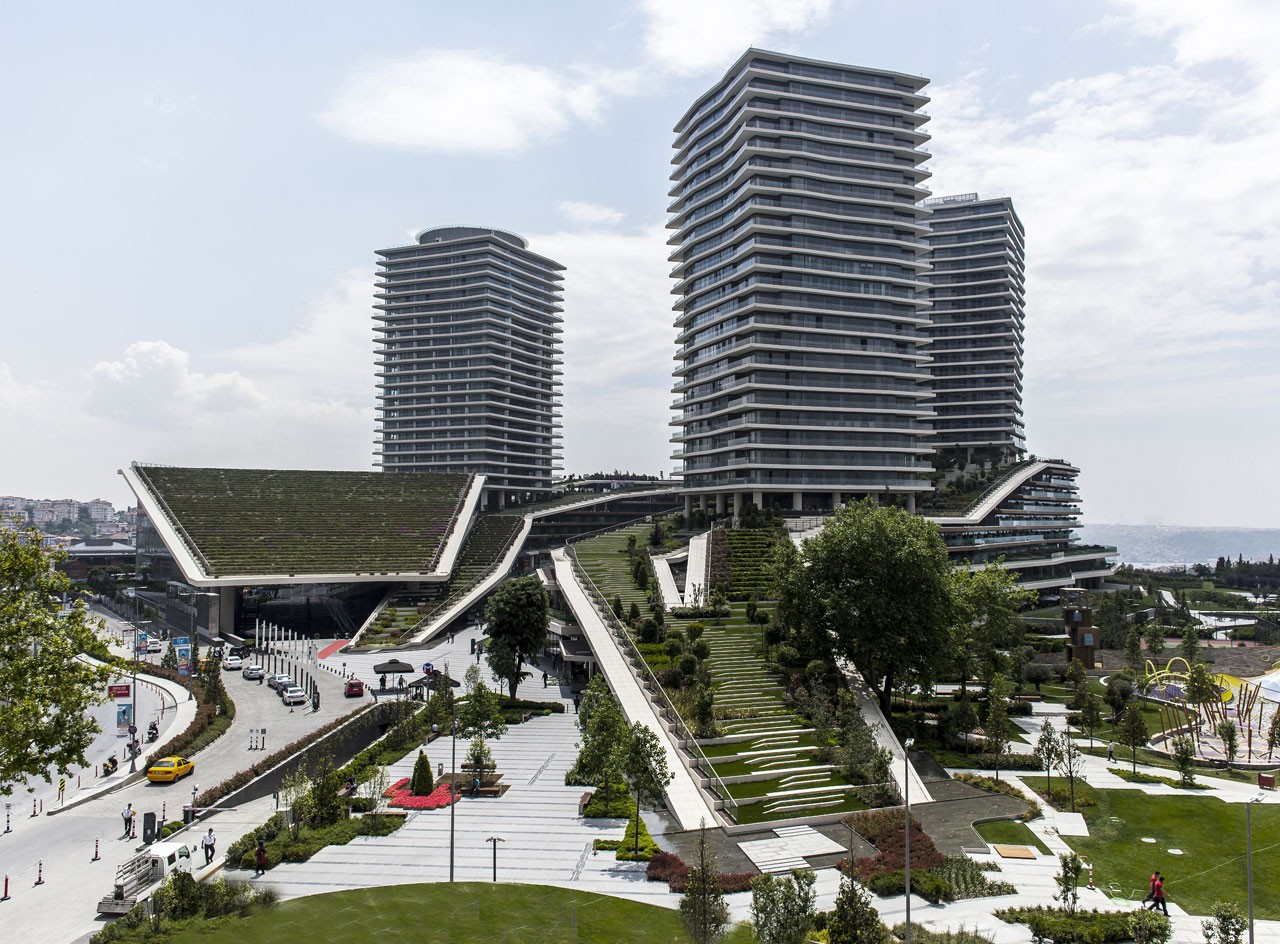

General information
- Type: Retail, office, hotel, residential
- Location: Koru Sokak No: 2 Levazım, Beşiktaş; Istanbul, Turkey
- Construction started: 2008
- Completed: 2013
- Opened: 10 October 2013; 13 years ago
- Owner: Zorlu Holding

Technical details
- Floor area: 615,885 m^{2} (6,629,330 sq ft)

Design and construction
- Architects: Emre Arolat Architects; Tabanlıoğlu Architects

Website
- www.zorlucenter.com.tr

Zorlu Center is a mixed-use high-rise building complex in the Beşiktaş district of Istanbul, Turkey containing an upscale shopping mall, a five-star Raffles hotel and a Cinemaximum megaplex, as well as residences and offices. It is home to Zorlu PSM, the largest performing arts center in the country, as well as the country's first Apple Store.

Built in 2013 to a design by Emre Arolat Architects and Tabanlıoğlu Architects, the center is situated at the junction of the European connection of the Bosphorus Bridge with Barbaros Boulevard, which proceeds to the north as Büyükdere Avenue in Levent and Maslak.

== History ==
At a public auction in 2007, Zorlu Real Estate, a subsidiary of Zorlu Holding, submitted the highest bid (US$800 million) to purchase the land at the junction of the Otoyol 1 highway—the European connection of the Bosphorus Bridge, and Büyükdere Avenue. It subsequently announced the "Zorlu Center Architecture and Urban Design Competition" for concept and design proposals. Over 100 firms applied and 13 were selected to take part in the competition with Tabanlıoğlu Architects and Emre Arolat Architects submitting the winning proposal. A Vision in Architecture: Projects for the Istanbul Zorlu Center (2012) by Süha Özkan documents the design competition. Construction of the project was completed in 2013.

== Architecture ==
The center is a four-tower, five-function structure group, including a public square, residential development, hotel, and office space. The design is stated to be "shaped by a modern understanding of architecture", based on the concept of a historical town square, incorporating "bold geometric lines that frame the sky, as well as large expanses of greenery".

== Retail ==
The shopping center contains over 200 shops, 40 cafés and restaurants. It contains stores of luxury brands such as Beymen, Atelier Rebul, Vakko, COS, Moncler, Bulgari, Pomellato, Louis Vuitton, Fendi, Lanvin, Dior, Miu Miu, Burberry, Tory Burch, Michael Kors and Valentino, as well as Turkey's first Apple Store. Beymen's largest store in the center covers some 10,000 square metres (110,000 sq ft) filled with "every fashionable item imaginable, from ready-to-wear to couture, cosmetics to home accessories, menswear to womenswear, accessories to books, and designers that are not available anywhere else in the city". Atelier Rebul is owned by Rebul, Istanbul's oldest drug store, and is a boutique selling specially made beauty products, including lavender, green tea, or jasmine.

Zorlu Center also contains numerous international restaurants and cafés, including Eataly, Jamie's Italian, and Tom's Kitchen. It also houses the restaurant Morini, owned by the AltaMarea Group, serving Italian and Mediterranean food under chef Michael White.

== Hotel ==
The Raffles Istanbul Hotel and Spa opened in September 2014. It is home to 3 restaurants, 49 suites and 136 guest rooms.

== Zorlu Performing Arts Center ==
Zorlu PSM, the largest performing arts center in the city, was developed by Nederlander Worldwide Entertainment. It features a 770-seat theater as well as a 2,300-seat concert hall.

== Public transportation ==
Zincirlikuyu immediately bordering the center to the west is home to Gayrettepe metro station which along with the major metrobus transfer station Zincirlikuyu is connected to Zorlu Center by pedestrian tunnels and walkways. Zincirlikuyu metrobus station is connected to Gayrettepe metro station and to Zorlu Center with pedestrian tunnels of a total length of 770 m (2,530 ft) and 230 m (750 ft)-long pedestrian underpasses, which include 6 escalators, 7 elevators for disabled persons and 14 moving walkways of 368 m (1,207 ft) length. The construction of the connections cost ₺40 million.

== Gallery ==
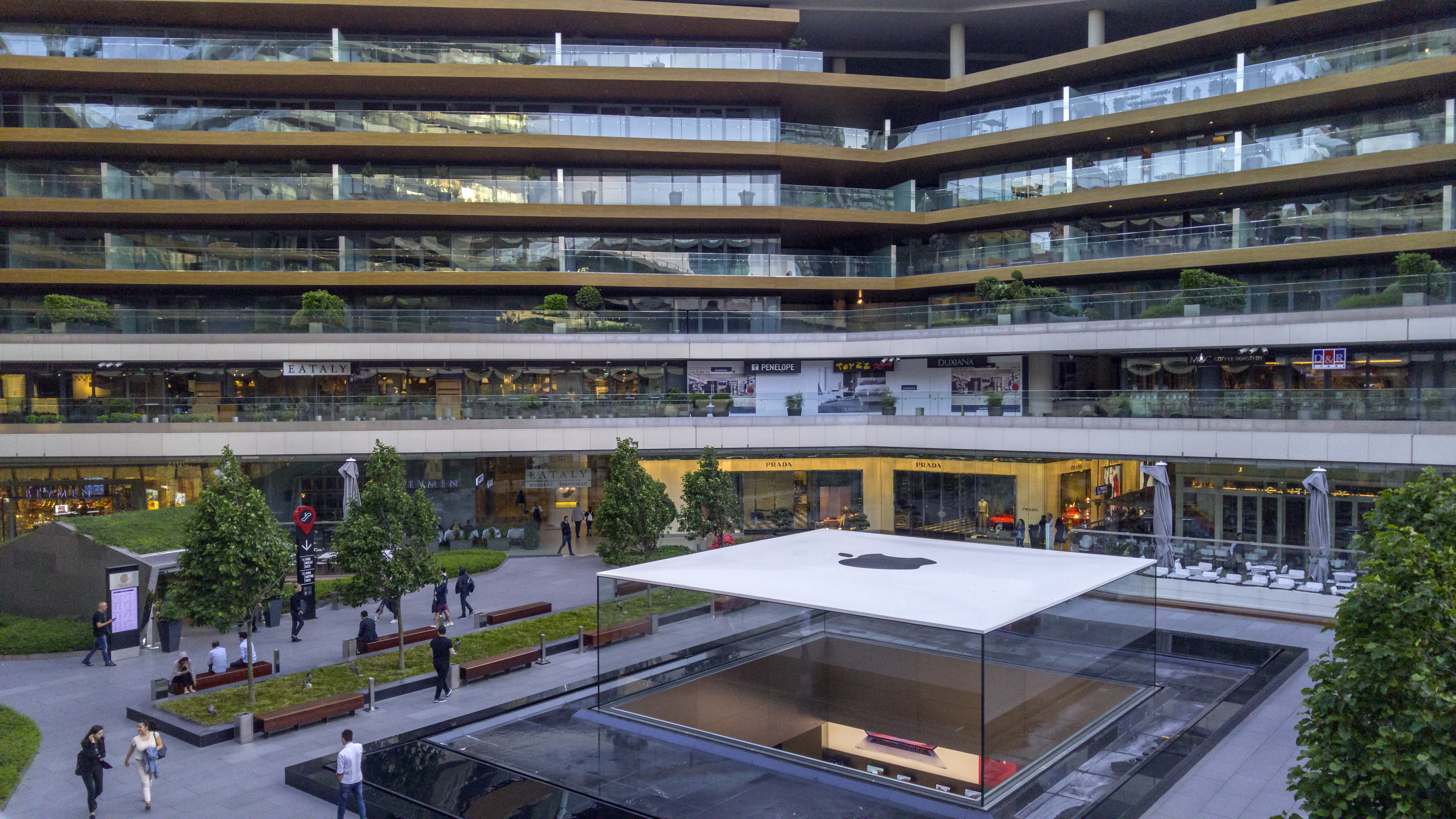
Roof of Apple Store at Zorlu Center

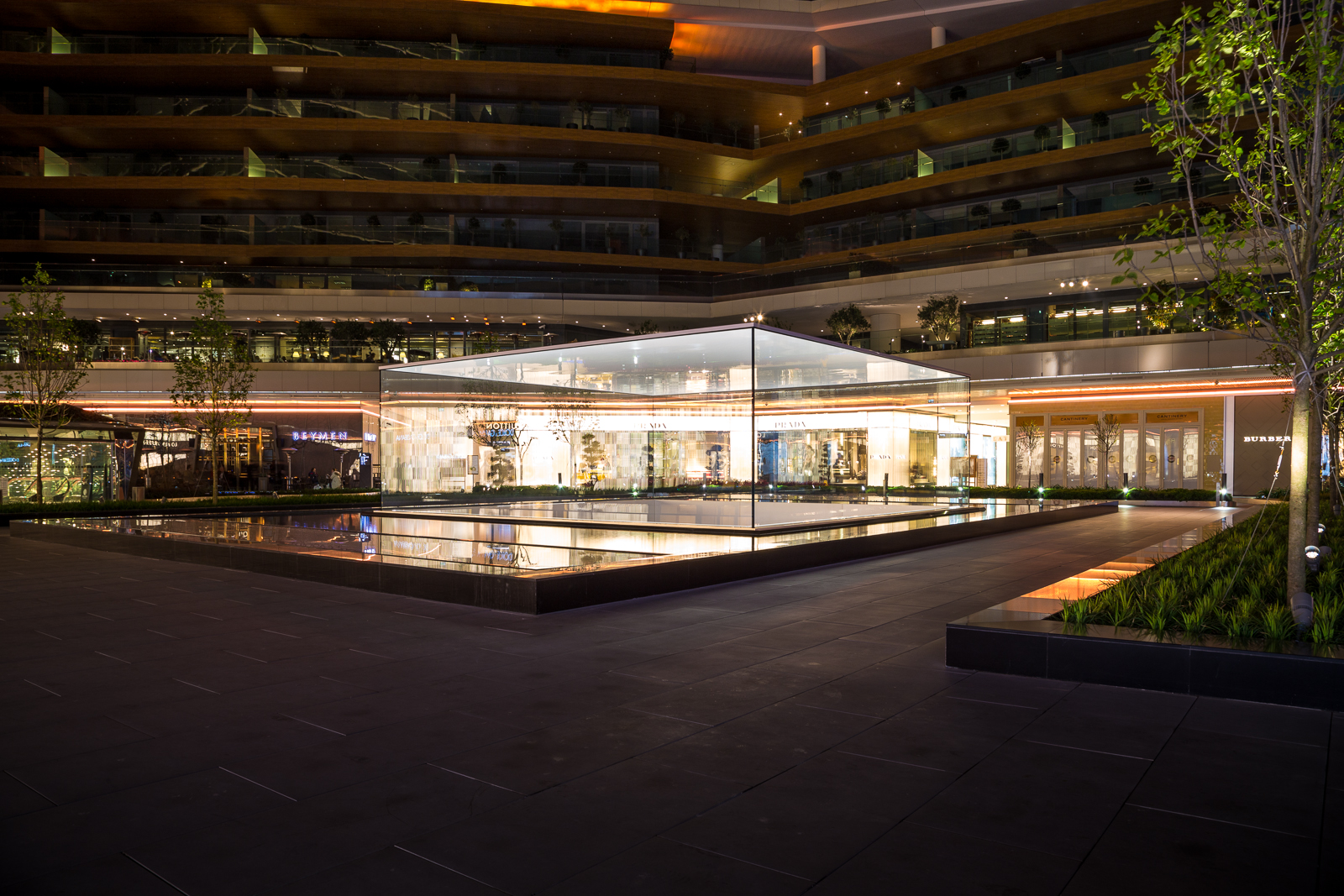
Roof of Apple Store at Zorlu Center

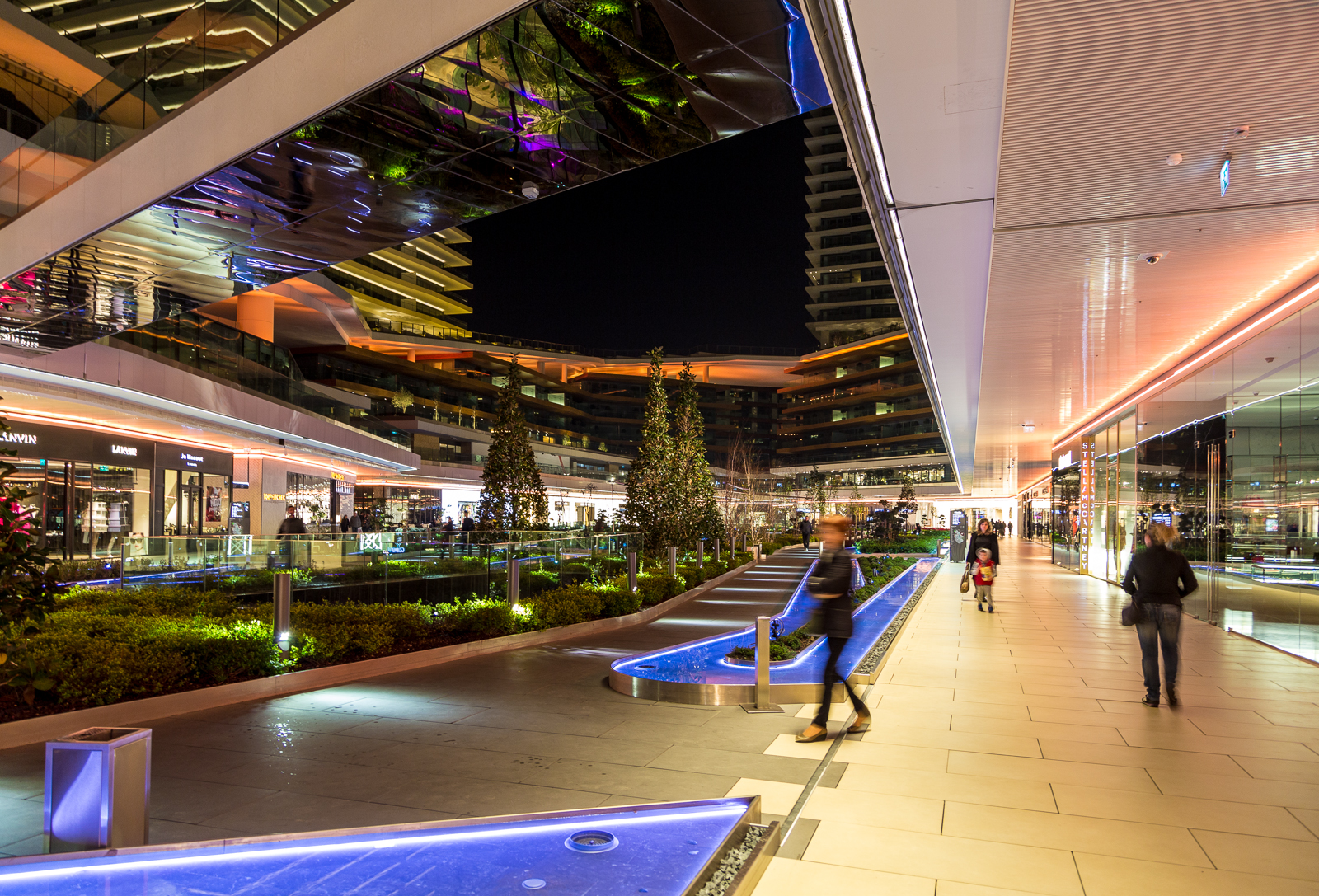
Interior view

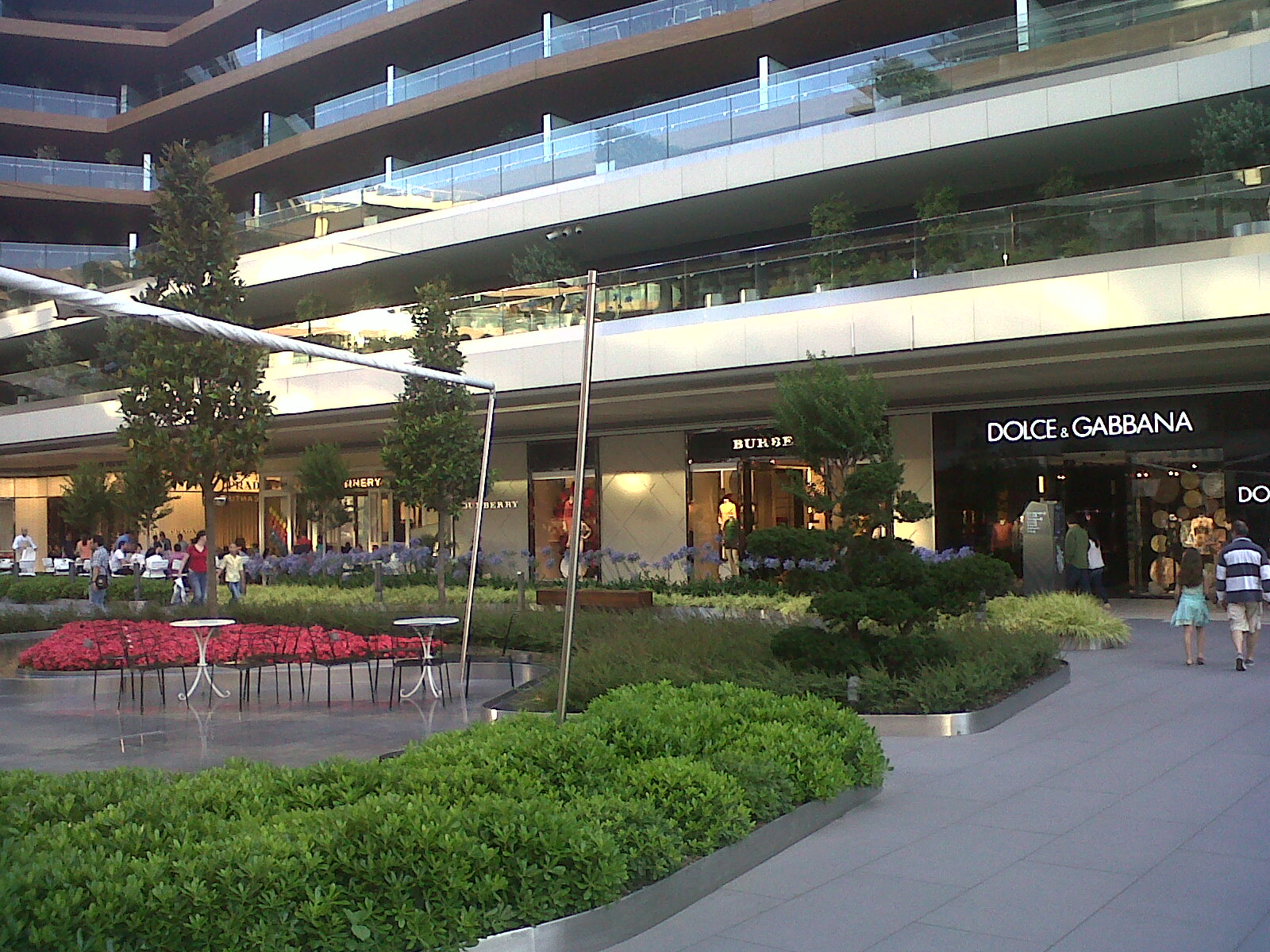
Dolce & Gabbana and Burberry stores

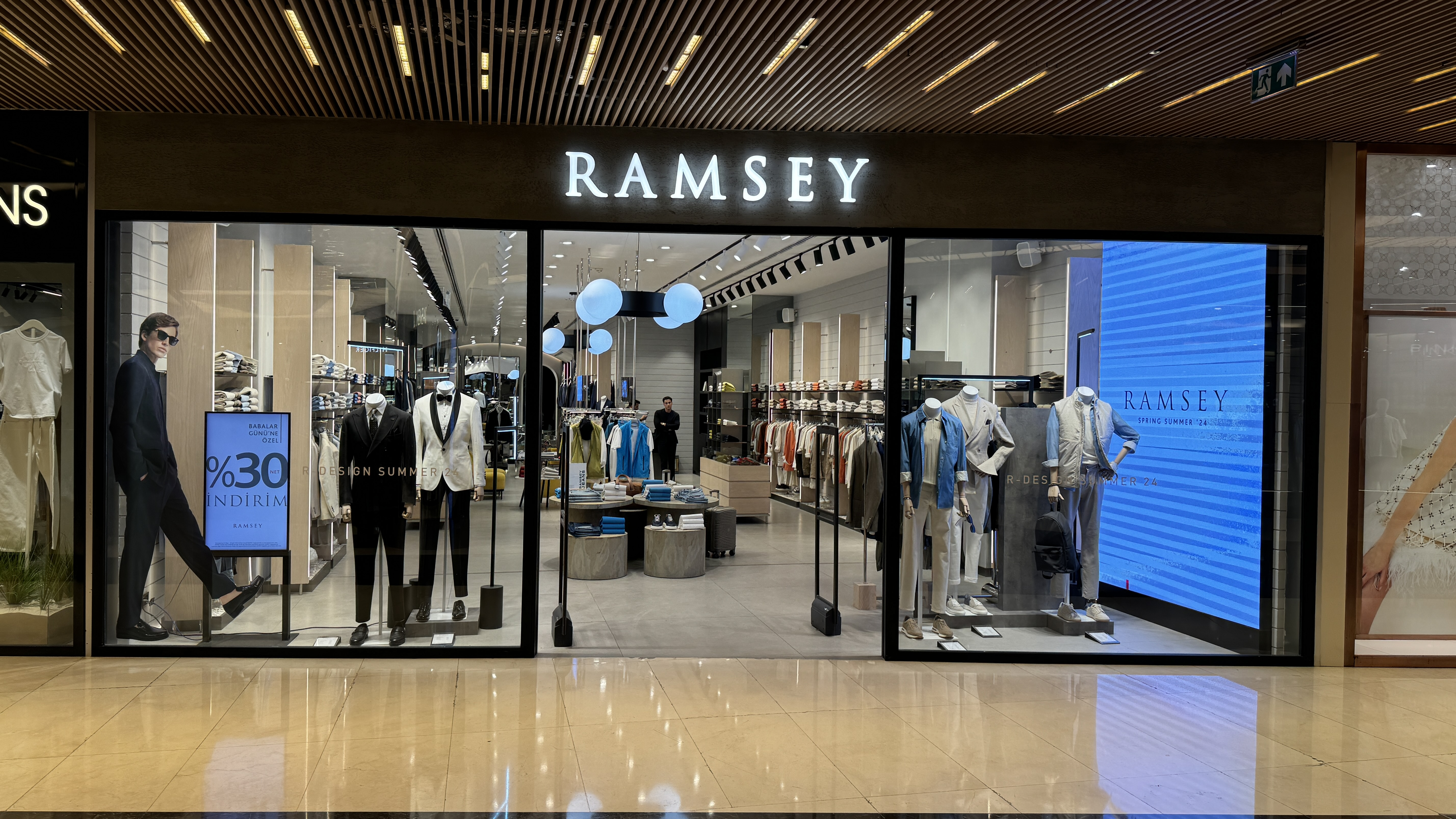
Ramsey store

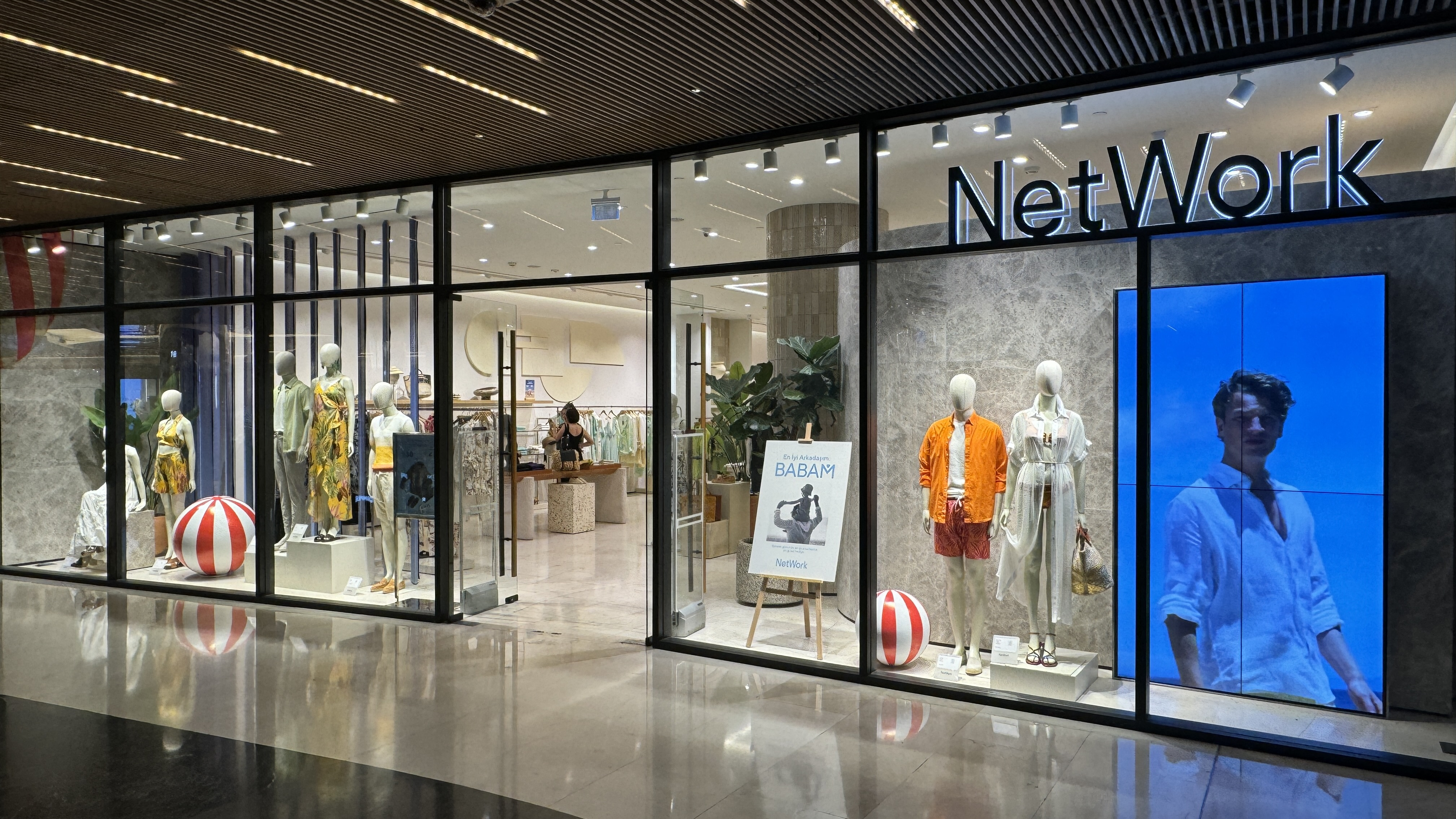
NetWork store

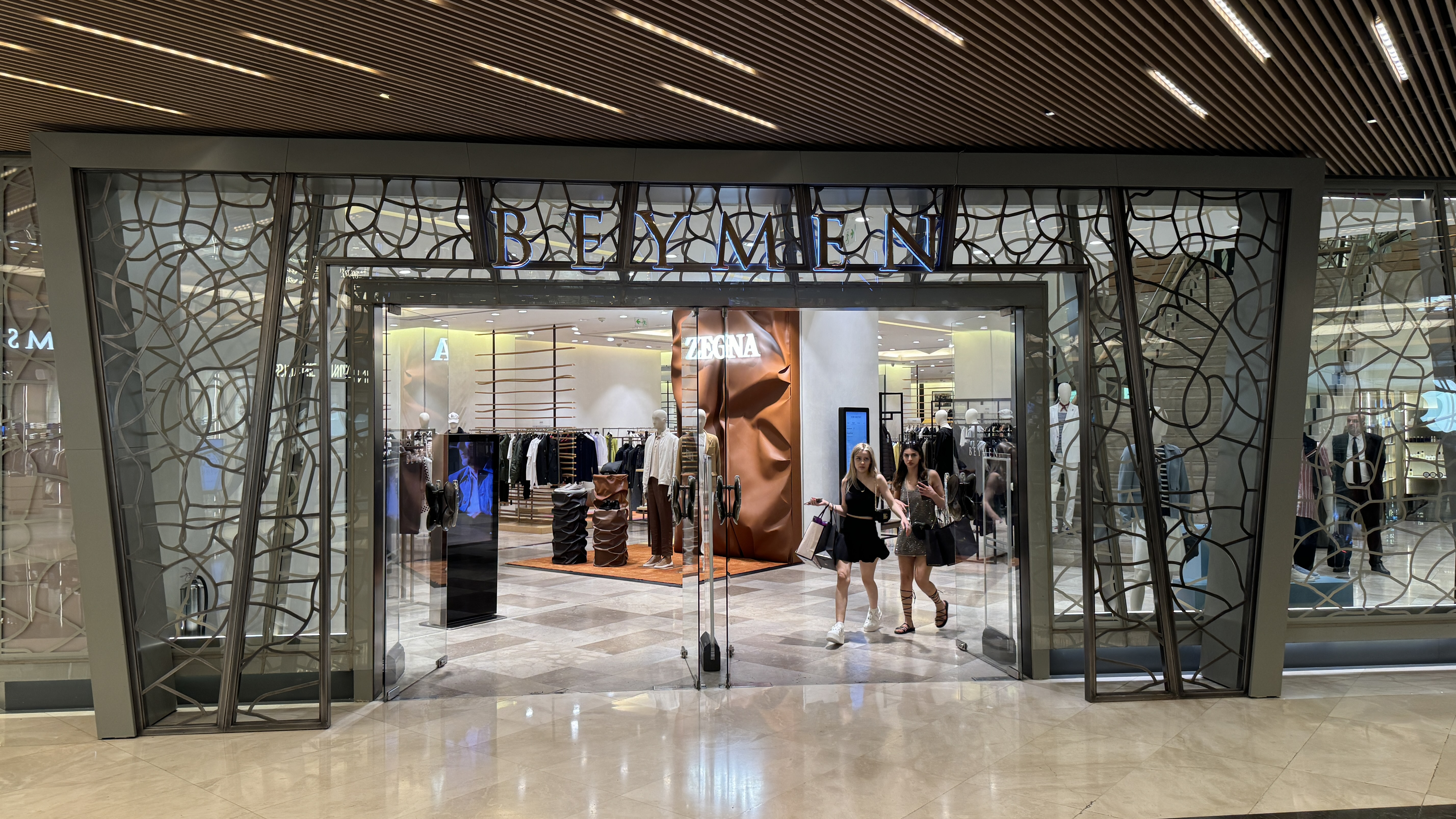
Beymen department store

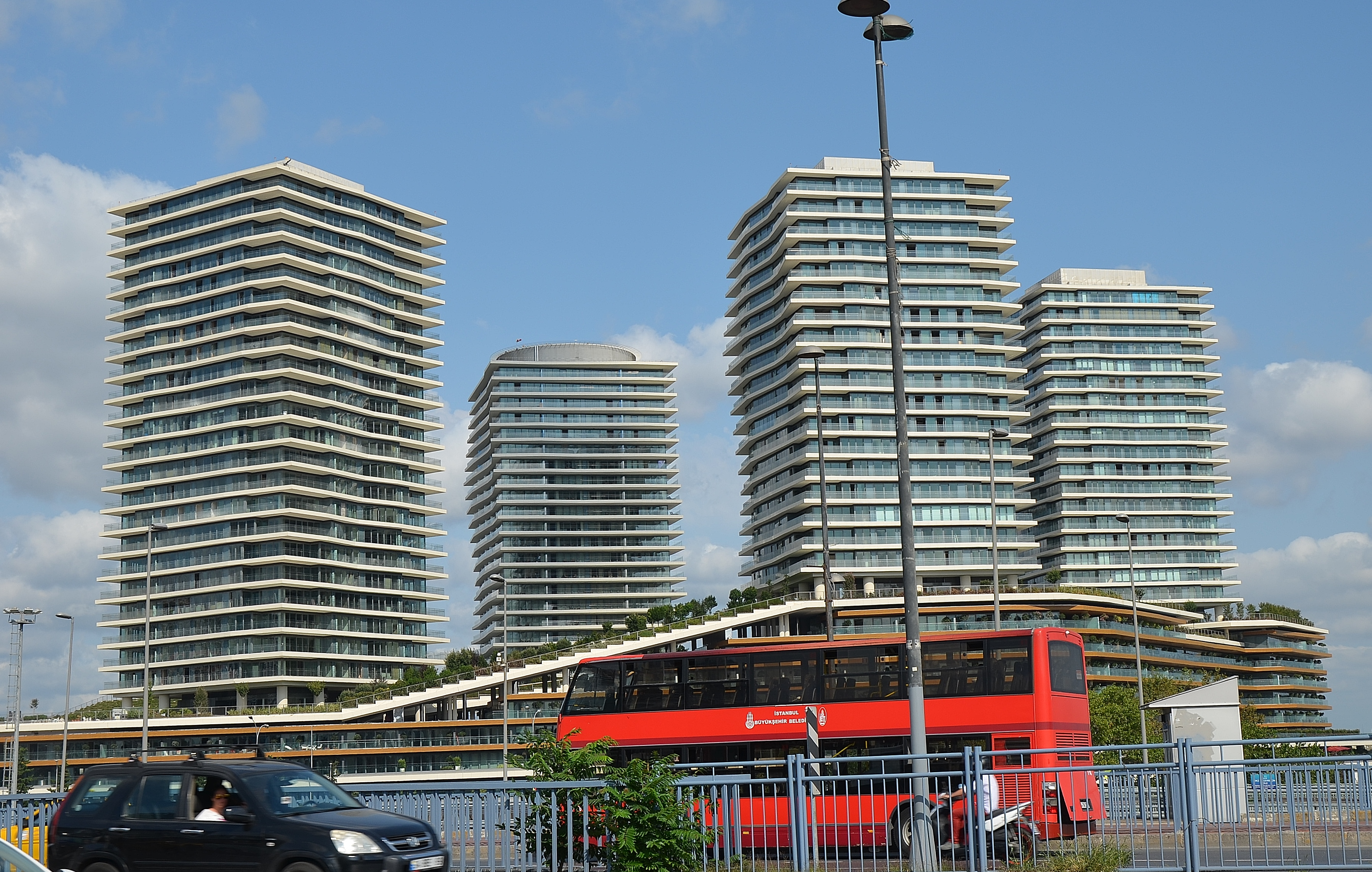
View from Barbaros Boulevard
