= Zincirlikuyu =

Quarter of Istanbul, Turkey

- Quarter
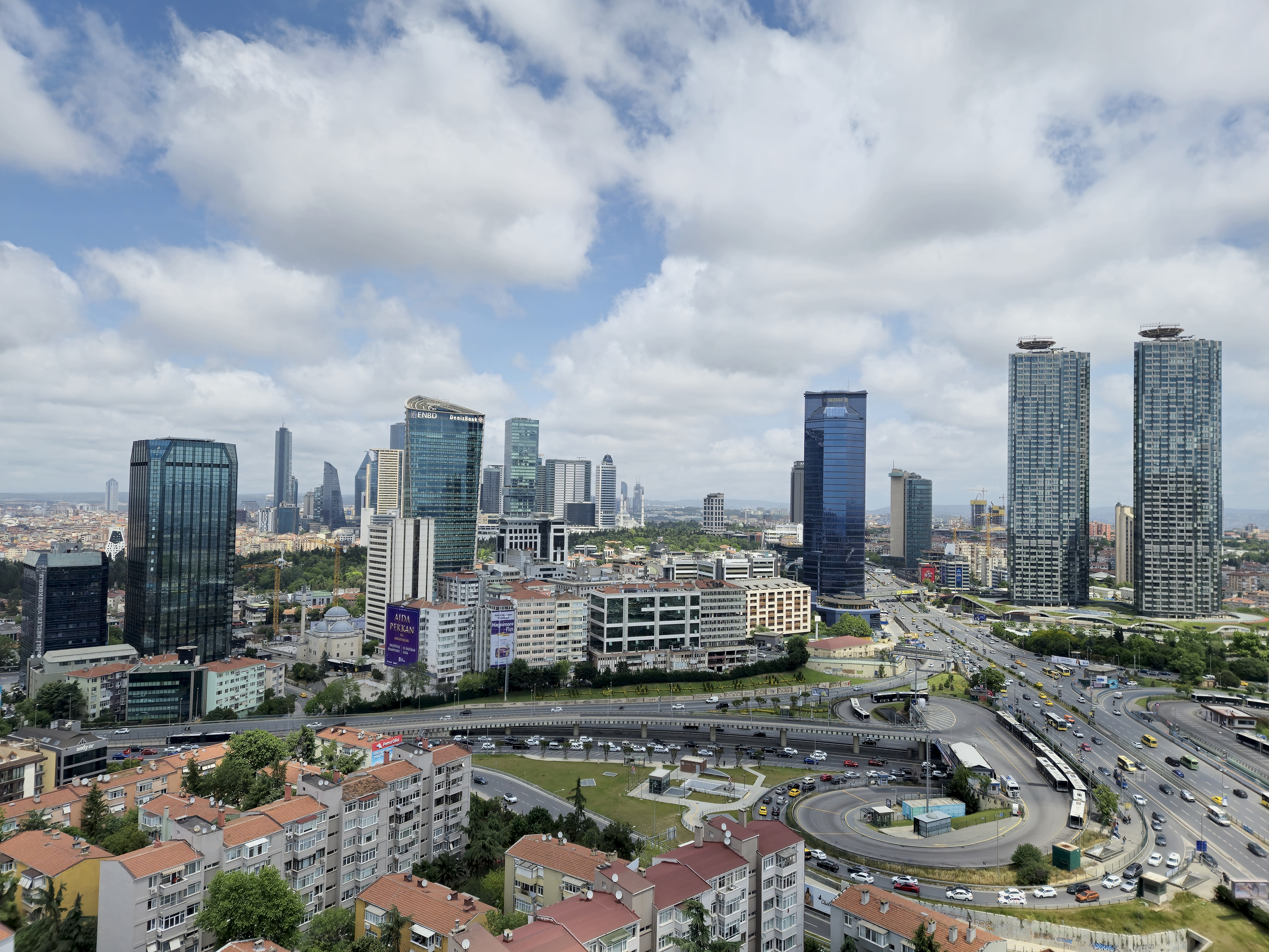
- Zincirlikuyu Junction and the skyline

- Location of Şişli in Istanbul
- Coordinates: 41.0661°N 29.0130°E
- Country: Turkey
- Province: Istanbul
- District: Şişli
- Time zone: GMT +2
- Area code: (+90) 212

Interactive map of thoroughfare, highway and metro lines converging at Zincirlikuyu

1 Barbaros Boulevard, from Beşiktaş
2 Büyükdere Avenue, towards Levent

3 O-1 motorway, from the Bosphorus Bridge to Mecidiyeköy
4 Bosphorus Bridge (15 July Martyrs Bridge)

5 Metrobus, Zincirlikuyu station (routes 34, 34A, 34AS, 34BZ, 34G, 34Z)
6 M2 metro, Gayrettepe station
7 M11 metro, from Gayrettepe towards Istanbul Airport

8 Zincirlikuyu Cemetery

Zincirlikuyu is a quarter of the Şişli district on the European side of Istanbul, Turkey. Part of Esentepe neighborhood, it is situated on a hilltop on the district border to Beşiktaş in the east. The has undergone redevelopment, notably the opening of the Zorlu Center mixed-use development in 2013, and .

Zincirlikuyu is a busy bus hub as well as a major traffic junction, where Barbaros Boulevard coming from Beşiktaş meets Büyükdere Avenue in the direction of Levent, and crosses over the motorway Otoyol 1, connecting the First Bosphorus Bridge with Mecidiyeköy.

== Points of interest ==
=== Zorlu Center ===
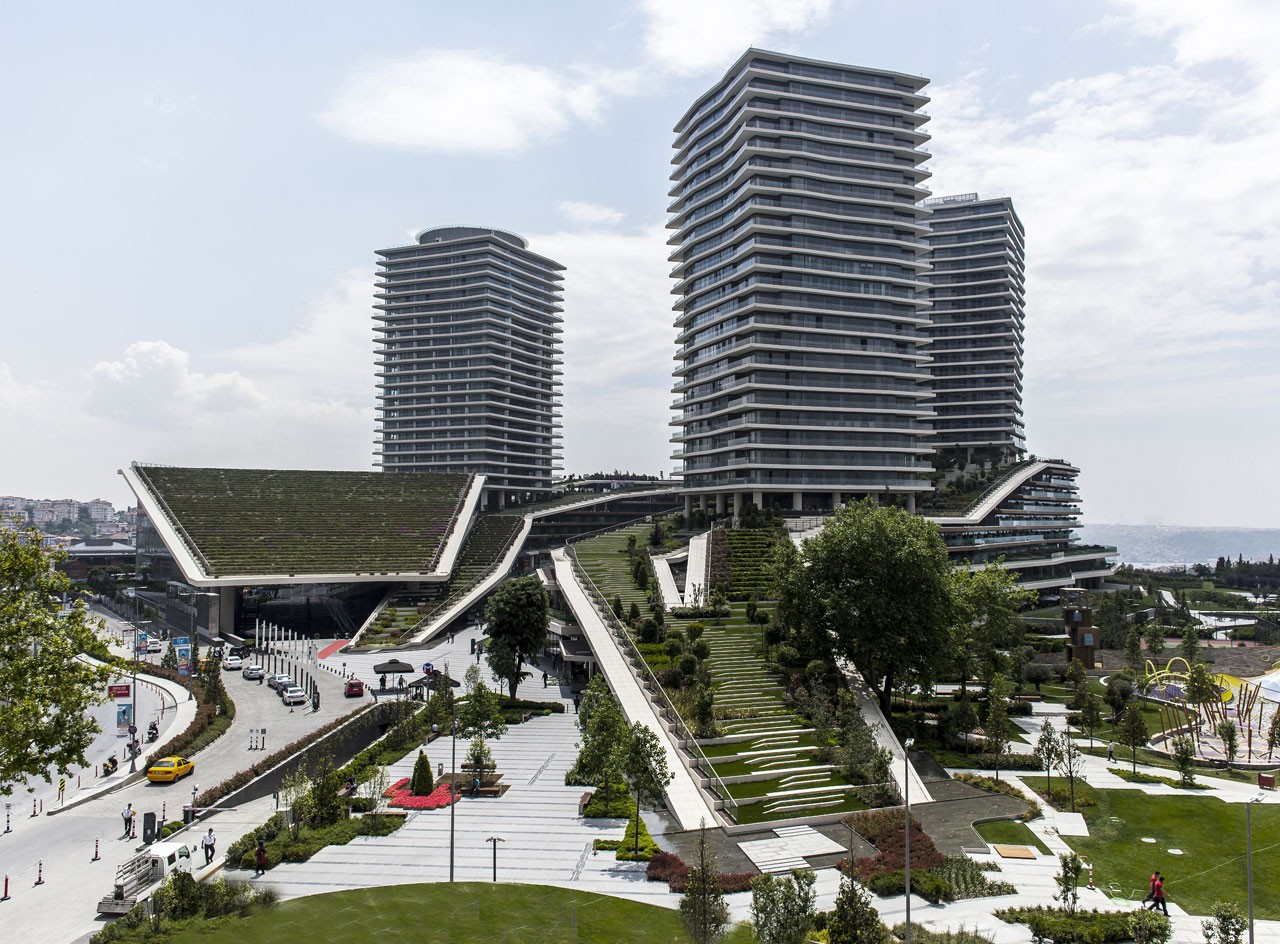
Zorlu Center Towers

Opened in October 2013, the Zorlu Center is an mixed-use development consisting of residential units, office space and a shopping center with over 200 shops, 40 cafés and restaurants. It includes also the city's largest performing arts center.

=== Cemetery ===
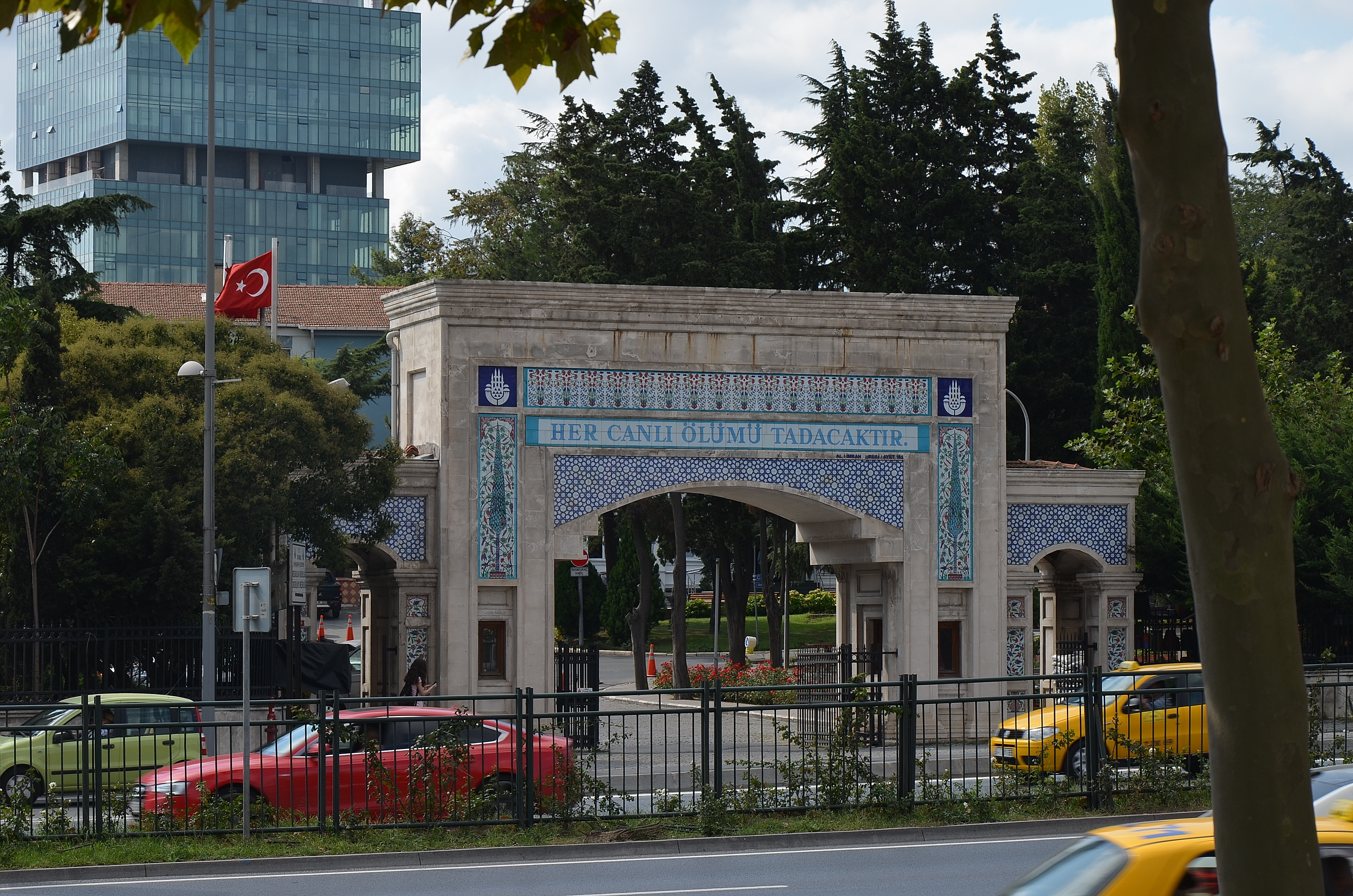
Main gate of Zincirlikuyu Cemetery

As Istanbul's one of the largest burial grounds, the Zincirlikuyu Cemetery, covers with its area of 0.381 km^{2} (94 acres) most of the quarter. Planned in 1935 in a contemporary design in the then-outskirts of the city, it reached full capacity in the 1950s. The cemetery holds the graves of prominent figures from the world of politics, business, sports and arts such as:

- Yaşar Kemal (1923–2015), novelist and Turkey's first candidate for the Nobel Prize in Literature
- Vehbi Koç (1901–1996), industrialist and philanthropist, founder of the Koç Group (Koç Holding)
- Sakıp Sabancı (1933–2004), industrialist, chairman of Sabancı Holding (1967–2004)
- Kemal Sunal (1944–2000), film actor and comedian
- Abdi İpekçi (1929–1979), journalist and editor-in-chief of Milliyet, assassinated in 1979

The headquarters of the Metropolitan Municipality's Cemetery Service is located also here.

== Education ==
=== Vocational high school for construction ===
The İSOV Vocational High School (Turkish: Sanayi Odası Vakfı Yapı Teknik ve Endüstri Meslek Lisesi), a secondary educational institution for construction of built environment run by the Foundation of the Istanbul Chamber of Industry (İSOV), neighbours to the south of Zincirlikuyu Cemetery. The school complex, consisting of several buildings on a land of 40 daa (40,000 m^{2}), was constructed by the court architect Sarkis Balyan (1835–1899) in 1884. It was used in the beginnings as a summer hunting mansion by Yusuf Izzettin Efendi (1857-1916), the son of Sultan Abdülaziz (1830–1876) and the Crown Prince of the Ottoman Empire from 1909 until his death. Following his death, his family resided in the premises, which consisted of three buildings, for women (harem), men and guests and servants. From 1923 until 1939, the complex served as a primary school for orphans. It was then enlarged by new buildings, and converted into a vocational high school for the education of construction masters. In 2000, the high school's administration was transferred to the İSOV.

== Transportation ==
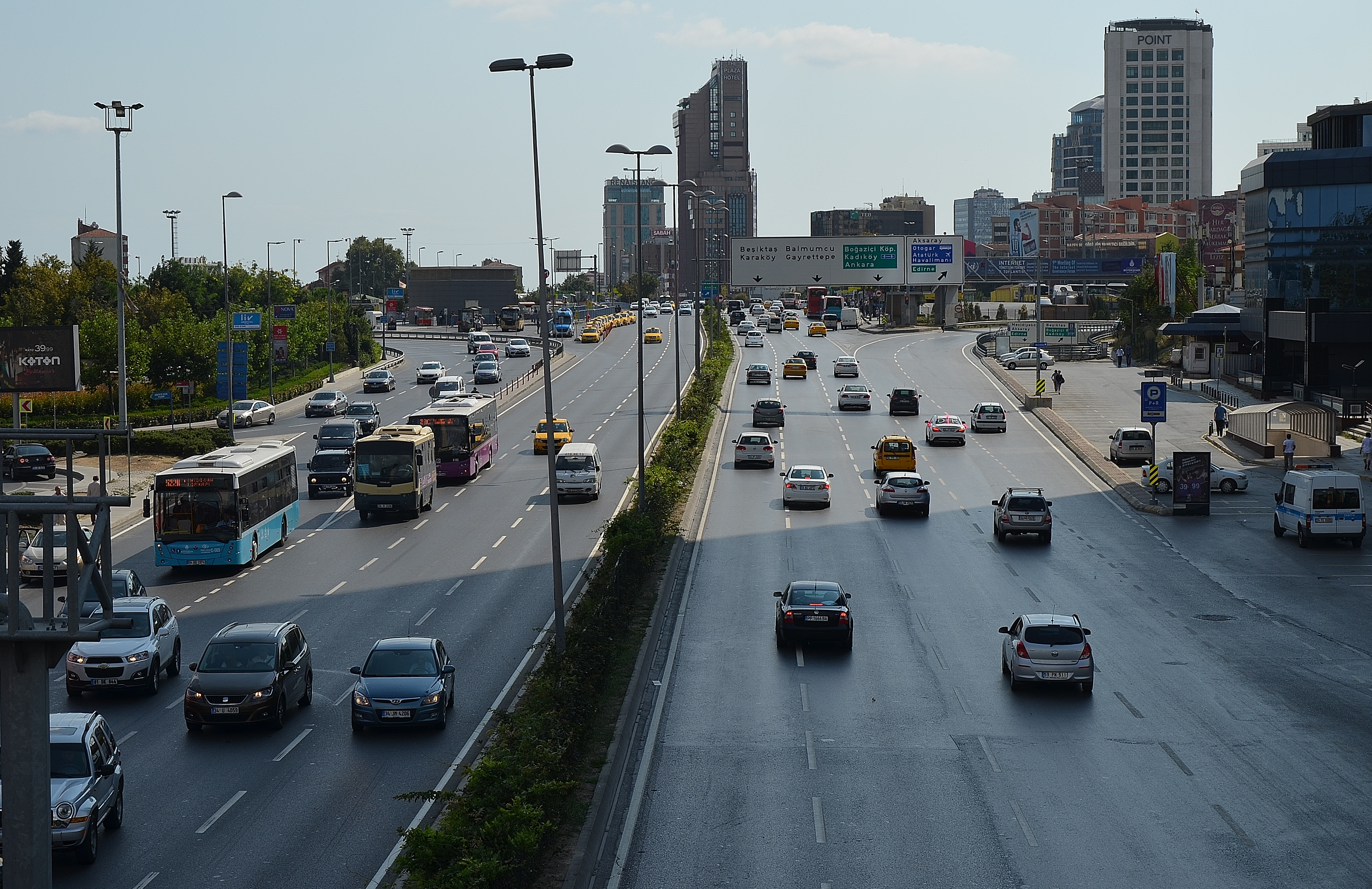
Barbaros Boulevard at Zincirlikuyu

Zincirlikuyu is a major bus interchange on the European side in Istanbul. It features bus stations in all four directions, to Levent, Mecidiyeköy and Beşiktaş as the first stop before the First Bosphorus Bridge and the last one after the bridge for commuter bus traffic coming from the Asian side of the city. It is served by more than forty İETT city bus lines, and five of the eight metrobus lines, being the terminal of some.

Zincirlikuyu metrobus station is connected to Gayrettepe metro station and to Zorlu Center with pedestrian tunnels of a total length of 770 m (2,530 ft) and 230 m (750 ft)-long pedestrian underpasses, which include 6 escalators, 7 elevators for disabled persons and 14 moving walkways of 368 m (1,207 ft) length. The construction of the connections cost ₺40 million.
