= Zorlu PSM =

Performing arts center in Istanbul, Turkey

Coordinates: 41°4′0″N 29°1′1″E

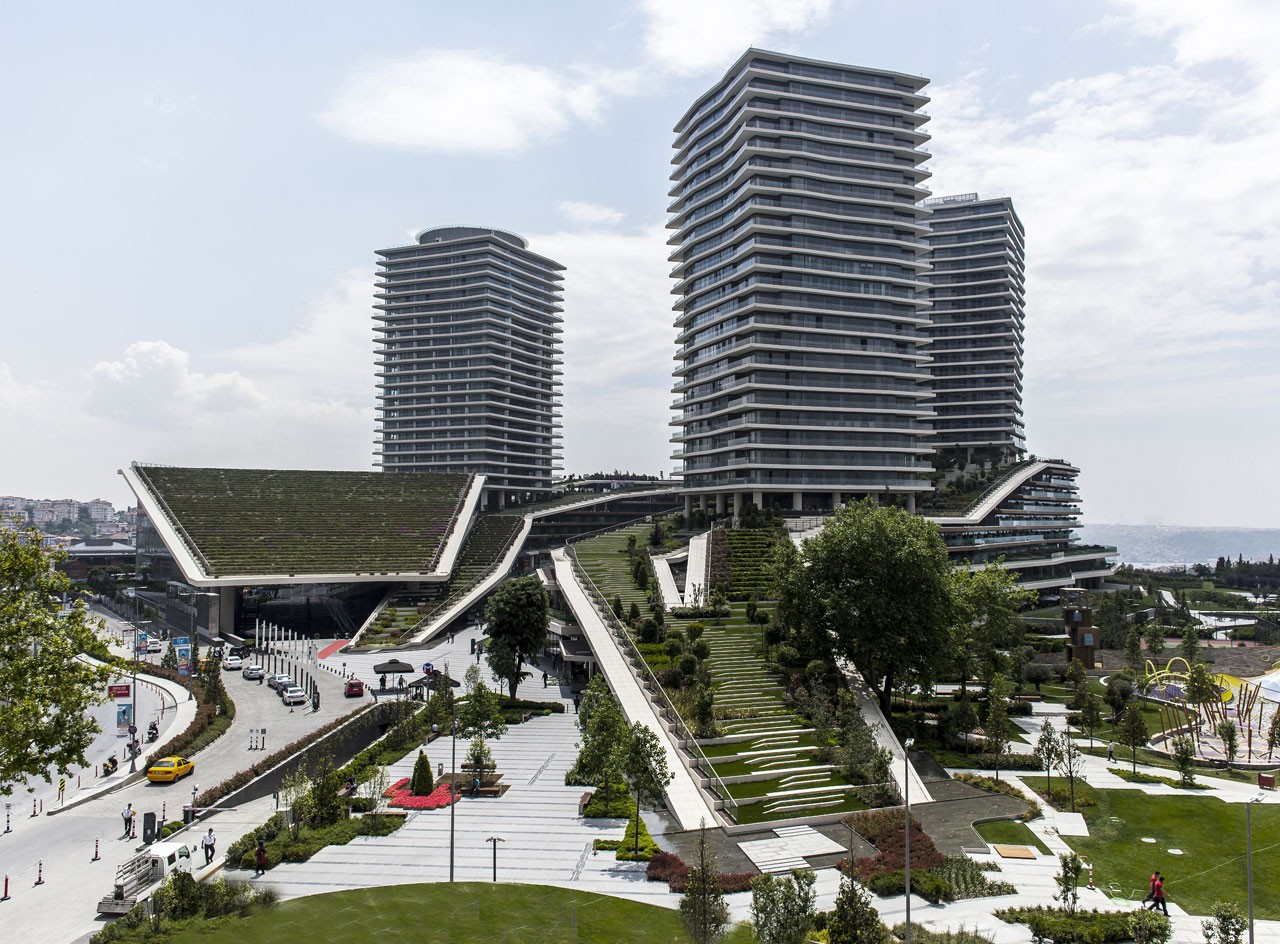
Turkish architect Emre Arolat designed Zorlu Center

Zorlu PSM (Turkish: Zorlu Performans Sanatları Merkezi, English: Zorlu Performing Arts Center) inside Zorlu Center in Istanbul, is currently the largest dedicated performing arts theatre and concert hall in Turkey. It is in the Beşiktaş district on the European side of the city, near the junction between Barbaros Boulevard and Boulderer Avenue, near Levent.

The multi-venue facility was designed by Turkish architect Emre Arolat, with the two main theaters designed by Anne Minors. The facility measures approximately 55,000 sq. meters (595,000 sq. ft.). It includes both gallery and exhibition space, public lobby spaces, a VIP Lounge, five levels of administrative and stage support spaces, and one of Europe's largest main stage areas. The complex opened in October 2013 under the leadership of Robert Nederlander, Jr. at Nederlander Worldwide Entertainment and Founding CEO Ray Cullom, with an extended run of the West End Musical Jersey Boys.[1] Zorlu PSM hosts various art and culture events, including shows, musicals, artists, and bands. Zorlu PSM plays an important role in turning the city into a center of attraction. It aims to become one of the most prestigious art centers in Europe and the world.

Since its launch in October 2013, Zorlu PSM has hosted over 2 million individuals in 5,000 events, focusing on the universality, diversity, and richness of arts, since its launch in October 2013 and 2018. Creating an environment that generates approximately 15% of the arts, culture, and entertainment industry in Turkey, Zorlu PSM also offers a lively socializing platform for its guests.[2]

== Facilities ==
=== Turkcell Stage ===
The center's main theatre has natural acoustics for amplified or acoustic concerts and can accommodate a wide range of performances. The main theatre contains two balconies and has a 2,242-seat capacity. The stage measures 24m proscenium width, over 24m of depth, with a fly-tower height of 30m, and a total area (including wing space) of 1500m^{2}.

=== Turkcell Platinum Stage ===
A smaller version of the main theatre, the center's drama stage, has the same capabilities and is found across the lobby that connects both venues.

Equipped with sound, video, and light show systems and technology, the theatre and auditorium have one balcony and seats with a total capacity of 717.

The stage is 11m wide (proscenium) with 12m depth and a fly-tower measuring 12m, with a total area (including wings) of 315m^{2}. The stage also features a fully trapped stage floor, 5-star dressing rooms, and 8 additional dressing rooms, a total of 119 pieces. The orchestra pit can accommodate up to 24 musicians.

=== %100 Studio ===
Alongside the main theatre and the drama stage, the center features a multi-use studio theatre space.

The "studio" includes a 100m^{2} balcony, the "SSL" mixing room, and the "Post" editing room. This 500m^{2}-sized room provides for numerous activities and events such as recordings for film and orchestras, pre and post-music production, recording/editing/mixing and mastering, music rehearsals, dance/aerial, rehearsals/workshops/clinics, press conferences (up to 150 seats), meet & greets, small-sized VIP concerts (up to 110 seats), corporate events, small-sized theatre shows (up to 110 seats), and video and photograph shootings.

=== touché ===
Zorlu PSM's new club touché, which can host approximately 120 people, offers a selective menu and entertainment for guests including stand-up comedians, local artists, and foreign musicians.

=== Foyer ===
There are up to 16 concession areas within the venue. The foyer has the infrastructure to host cocktails, launches, art galleries, exhibitions, and corporate events with a total of 5200/m^{2} space.

=== PSM Ami ===
PSM Ami presents a regular series of free public performances open to any local performer on a Zorlu PSM stage.

== Highlights from first season ==
The first season featured the following events.

Category	Artist/Group	Tour	Notes
Broadway	Jersey Boys		First Broadway musical in the venue
Broadway	Cats		
Broadway	Notre-Dame de Paris		
Ballet	The Nutcracker		First time in Turkey
Jazz	Regina Carter Quartet		First performance at the Drama stage
Dance	Forever Tango		First time in Turkey
Show	Ballet Revolucion		First time in Turkey
Classic / Opera	Ludovico Einaudi & Ensemble		First performance at the venue and first time in Turkey
Classic	Spectacular Classics & John Williams Gala		
Classic	Sir James Galway		First time in New York
Classic / Opera	José Carreras		
Classic	Fazıl Say		First performance of a local artist at the venue
Classic / Crossover	2Cellos		First time in Turkey
Classic / Crossover	The Piano Guys		
Pop / Rock / Other	Blue	Roulette Tour	First time in Turkey
Pop / Rock / Other	Sezen Aksu, Fahir Atakoğlu & Ara Dinkjian		
Pop / Rock / Other	Nana Mouskouri		
Pop / Rock / Other	Haris Alexiou & İncesaz	Happy Birthday Tour	

== Highlights from season 6 ==
The sixth season featured the following events.

Category	Artist/Group	Notes
Broadway	Ghost the Musical	First time in Turkey
Festival	Sónar Istanbul	3rd edition
Broadway	An Evening with Hugh Jackman	First time in Turkey
Dance	New York City Ballet	First time in Turkey
Opera	La Bohème	First time in Turkey
Classical / Crossover	Silk Road Ensemble with Yo-Yo Ma	
Theatre	Love Letters with Gérard Depardieu and Anouk Aimée	First time in Turkey
Contemporary Theatre	Blam!	First time in Turkey
