= Atelier Rebul =

Turkish fragrance, cosmetics and personal care brand and retail chain

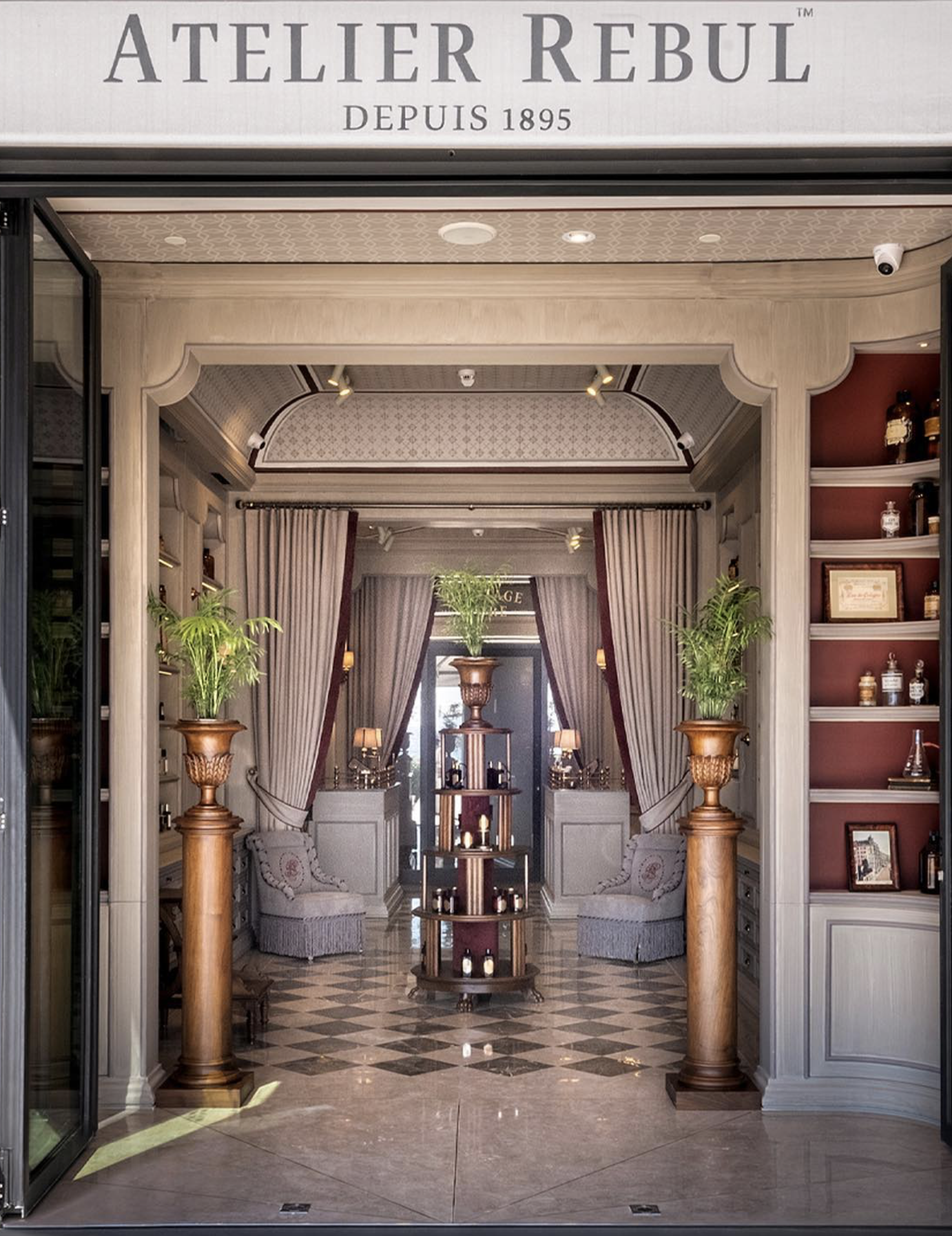
Atelier Rebul heritage store, Post Office Fashion Gallery, Galataport Istanbul

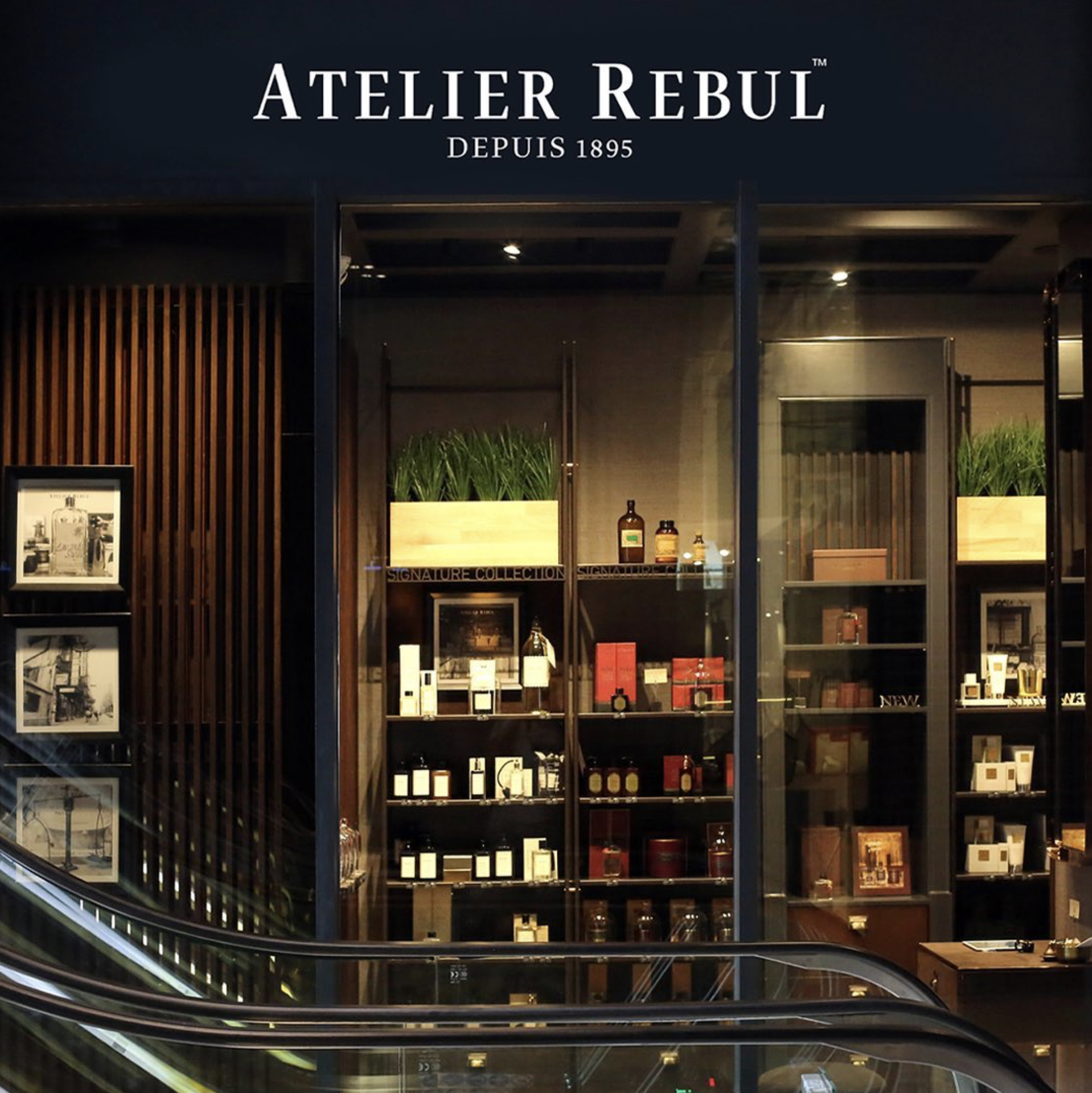
Atelier Rebul regular retail store, Galataport Istanbul

Atelier Rebul is a brand of fragrances, cosmetics, hair care products et al., based in Istanbul, Turkey. Its roots go back to the Rebul Pharmacy (Turkish: Rebul Eczanesi) on the city's famous Istiklal Caddesi (Independence Avenue), which French pharmacist Jean Cesar Reboul founded in 1895. It operates an eponymous chain of own-brand retail stores in Turkey and other countries.

== History ==
In 1895, Reboul was traveling to Trabzon in northeastern Turkey, to visit his father, an engineer of the Hopa–Trabzon highway. On the way, he was fascinated with Istanbul and opened one of Turkey's first pharmacies at #116, Rue de Pera (now #94, Istiklal Avenue) in the Pera district (now Beyoğlu), the Grande Pharmacie Parisienne ("Great Paris Pharmacy"). In 1938 it released the cologne Lavanda, which would become iconic. In 1939 Reboul returned to France and the pharmacy was run by his protegé and later partner, Kemal Müderrisoğlu.

The Atelier Rebul brand and stores were launched in 2013. As of 2020, monthly production capacity was 3,600,000 units; in 2020-1 the company transitioned production to a new 20,000-m^{2} factory in Çerkezköy.

The store at Galataport in the old post office building is historically themed and was designed by Ottoman Art Expert Serdar Gülgün. It opened in 2022.

In 2024, Nuket Filiba was co-CEO. That year, the company opened a store in Indonesia and announced plans to open in Thailand, Singapore and Malaysia after opening a flagship heritage store in Shanghai, China.
