= Büyükdere Avenue =

Street in Istanbul, Turkey

Büyükdere Avenue (Turkish: Büyükdere Caddesi) is a major avenue which runs through the districts of Şişli (Esentepe quarter), Beşiktaş (Levent quarter) and Sarıyer (Maslak quarter) on the European side of Istanbul, Turkey. It begins at Şişli Mosque and runs in an eastward direction partly under the viaduct of the inner-city motorway O-1 through Mecidiyeköy, Esentepe, until reaching Zincirlikuyu; where it joins with Barbaros Boulevard and turns northward passing through Levent, Sanayi Mahallesi, Maslak and by the Fatih Forest, ending at the Hacıosman Slope on the Sarıyer district border. Its total length is 14 km (8.7 mi). From Zincirlikuyu to Maslak, it forms a border line between the districts of Kağıthane in the east and Beşiktaş in the west.

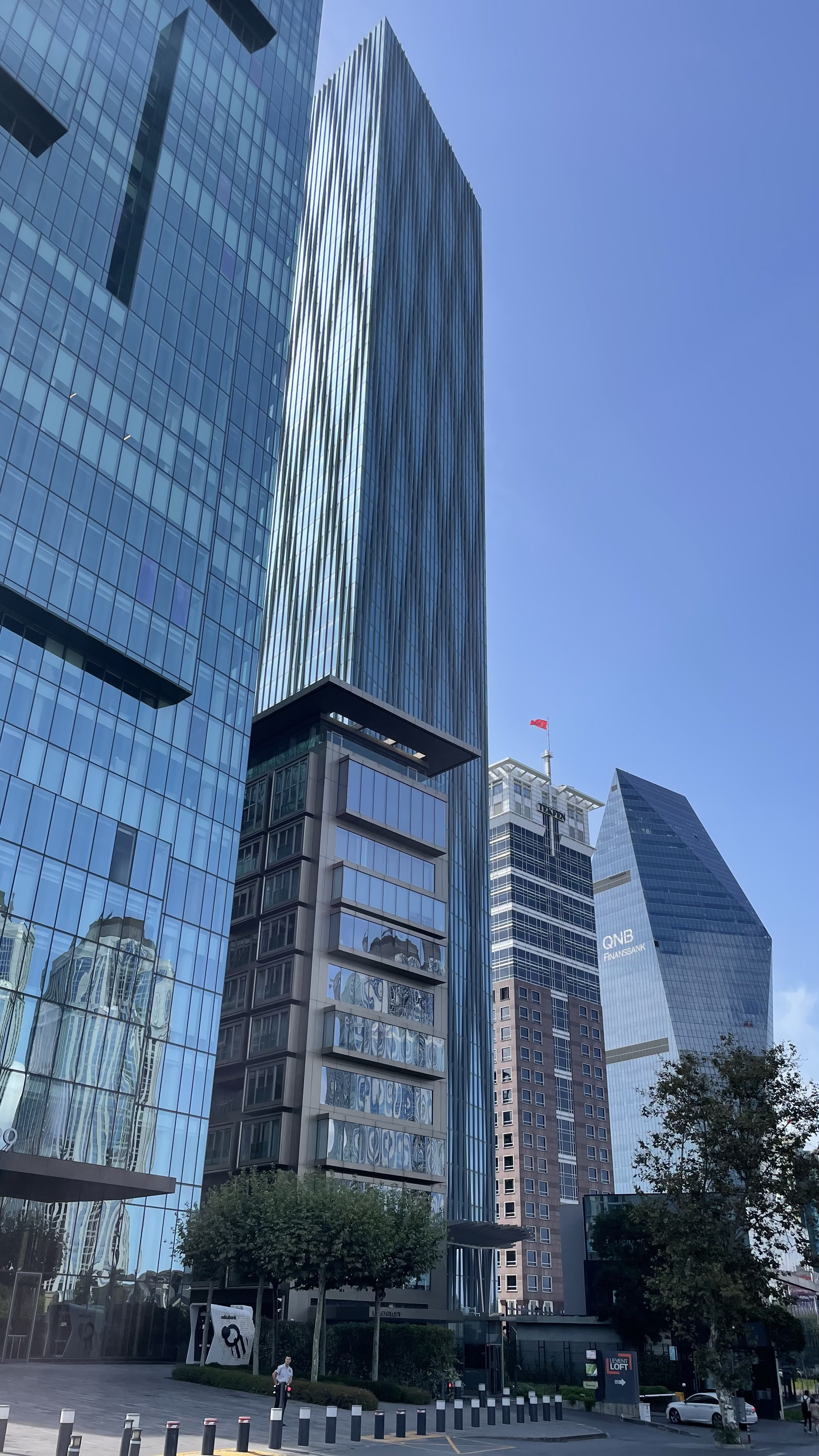
A view of Büyükdere Avenue in Levent

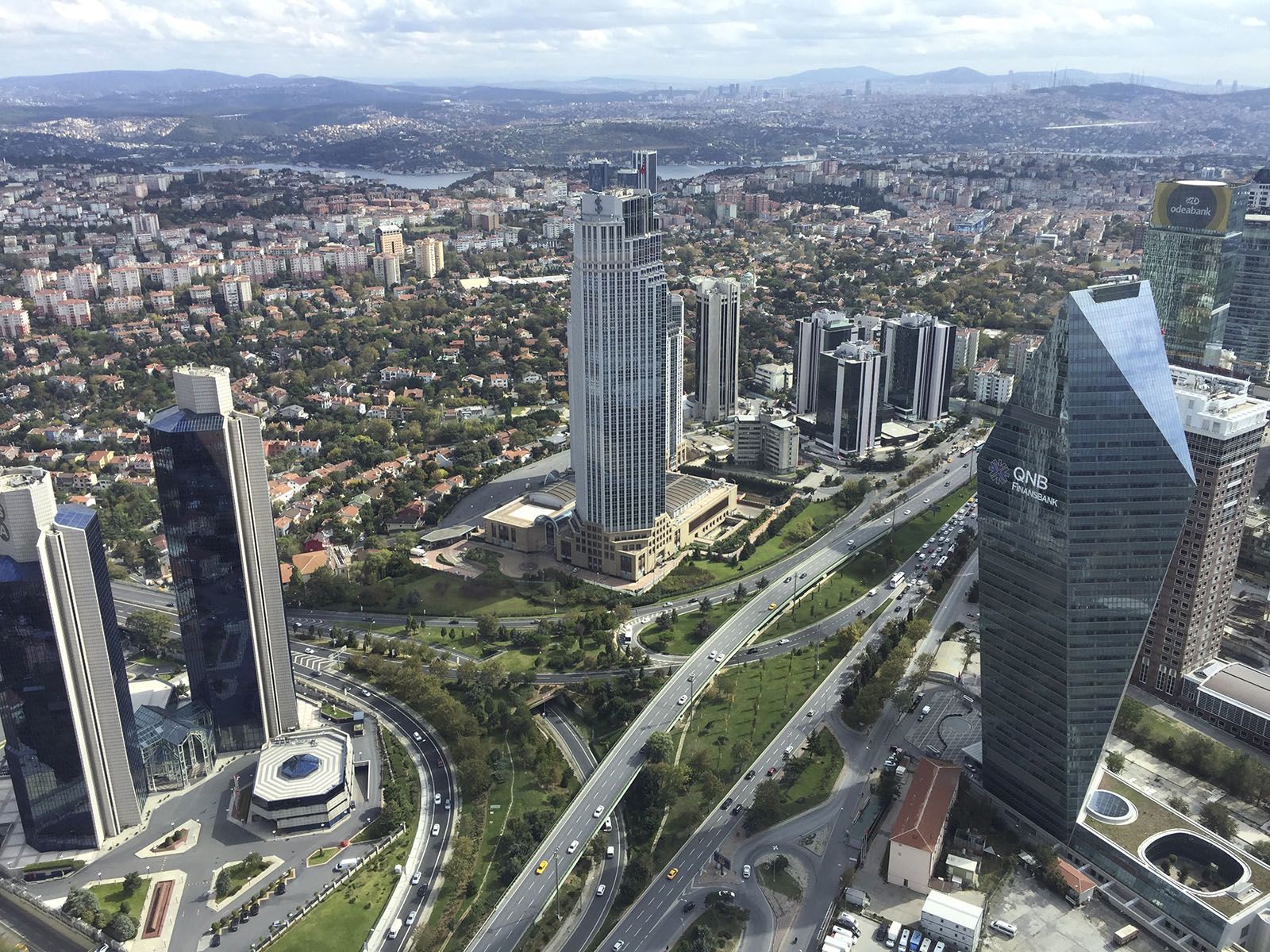
Büyükdere Avenue at the Levent Junction, with feeder to the O-2 motorway (left).

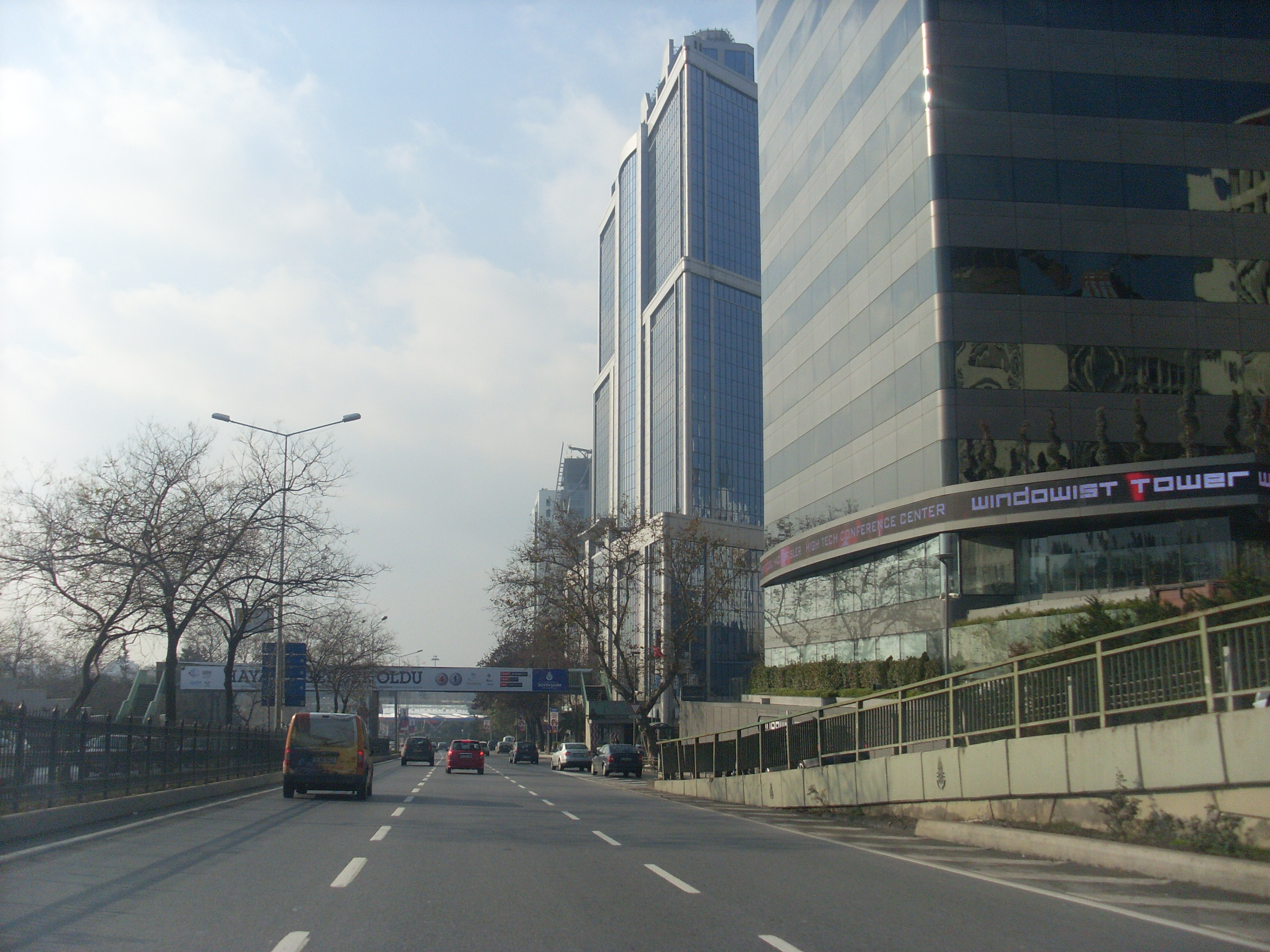
Büyükdere Avenue in Maslak, heading south.

It is named after the Büyükdere neighborhood of Sarıyer district, where it connects to. It is a major artery of the Istanbul Central Business District, which is not located in the historic center of the city.

The metro line M2 (Yenikapı–Hacıosman) follows the avenue between Şişli and Hacıosman, featuring nine metro stations. Headquarters of many banks, business centers, shopping centers, luxury hotels and numerous skyscrapers built in recent years are located around Büyükdere Avenue, making it an important route of financial, business and social life.

Residential or office skyscrapers found on Büyükdere Avenue include the Diamond of Istanbul, Istanbul Sapphire, Isbank Tower 1, Sabancı Center, Kanyon Towers, Finansbank Tower, among others. Notable shopping malls on the avenue include Zorlu Center, Kanyon Shopping Mall, MetroCity AVM and Özdilek Park.

Educational institutions on the avenue include Haliç University, ISOV Vocational High School for Construction, Istanbul Technical University's Maslak Campus, Işık University, and Yıldız Technical University Vocational College.

Two major cemeteries are situated on the avenue: the Mecidiyeköy Italo-Jewish Cemetery and Zincirlikuyu Cemetery.

On November 20, 2003, the headquarters of the HSBC Bank Turkey on Büyükdere Avenue in Levent was car bombed by a terrorist (suicide bomber) linked to Al Qaeda, killing and wounding a number of people. The street was closed to traffic for ten hours.

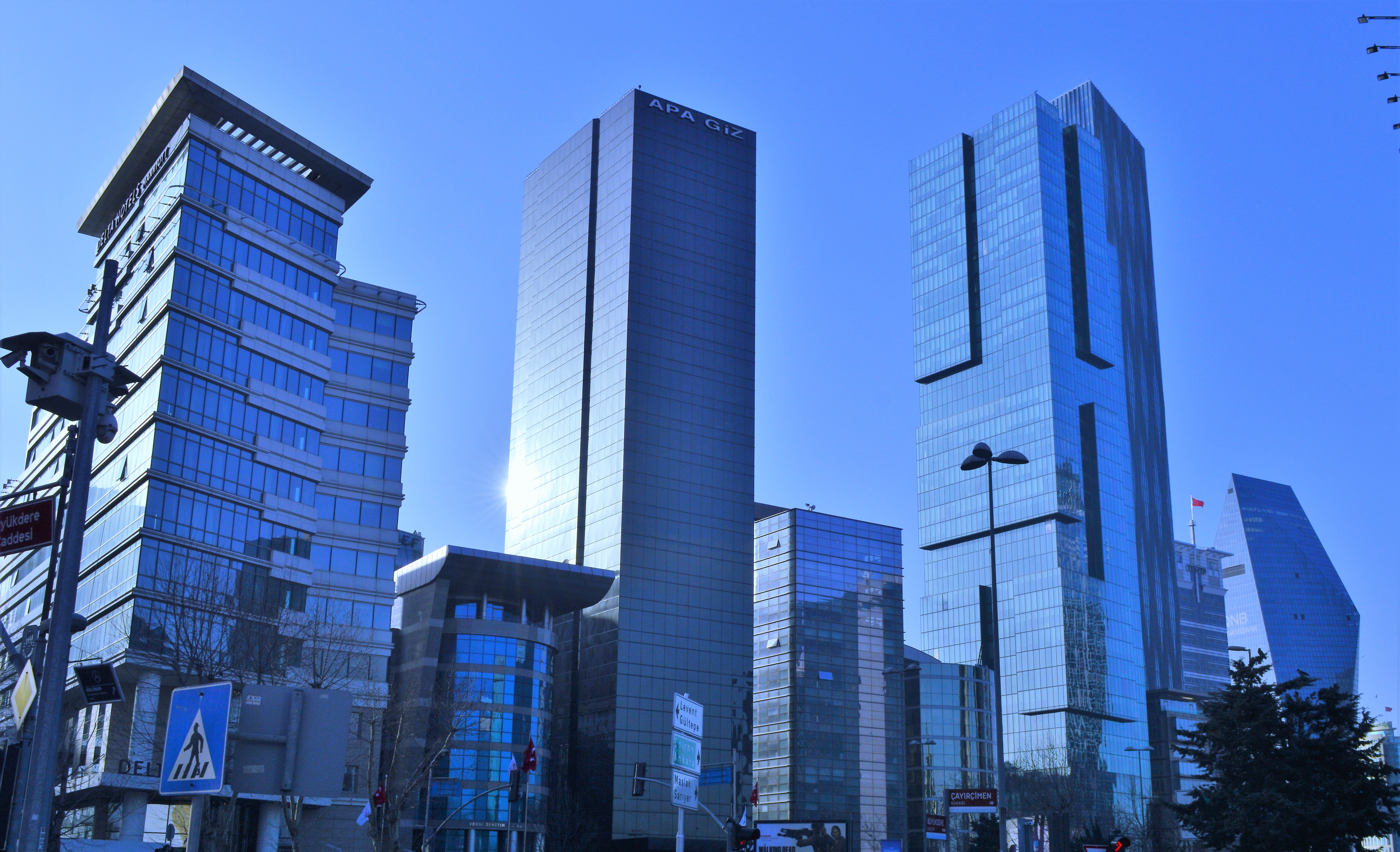
A view of Büyükdere Avenue in Levent

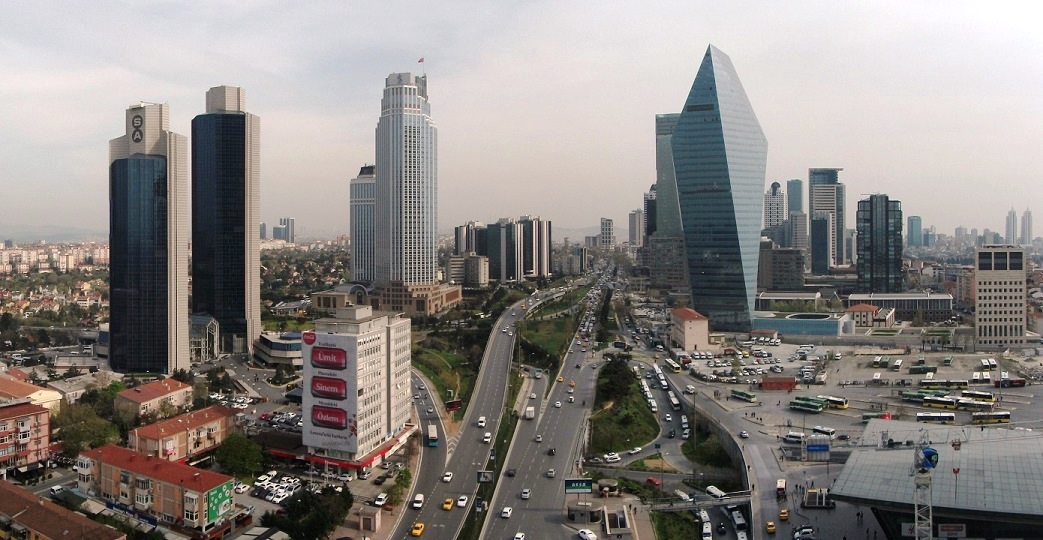
A view of Büyükdere Avenue in Levent

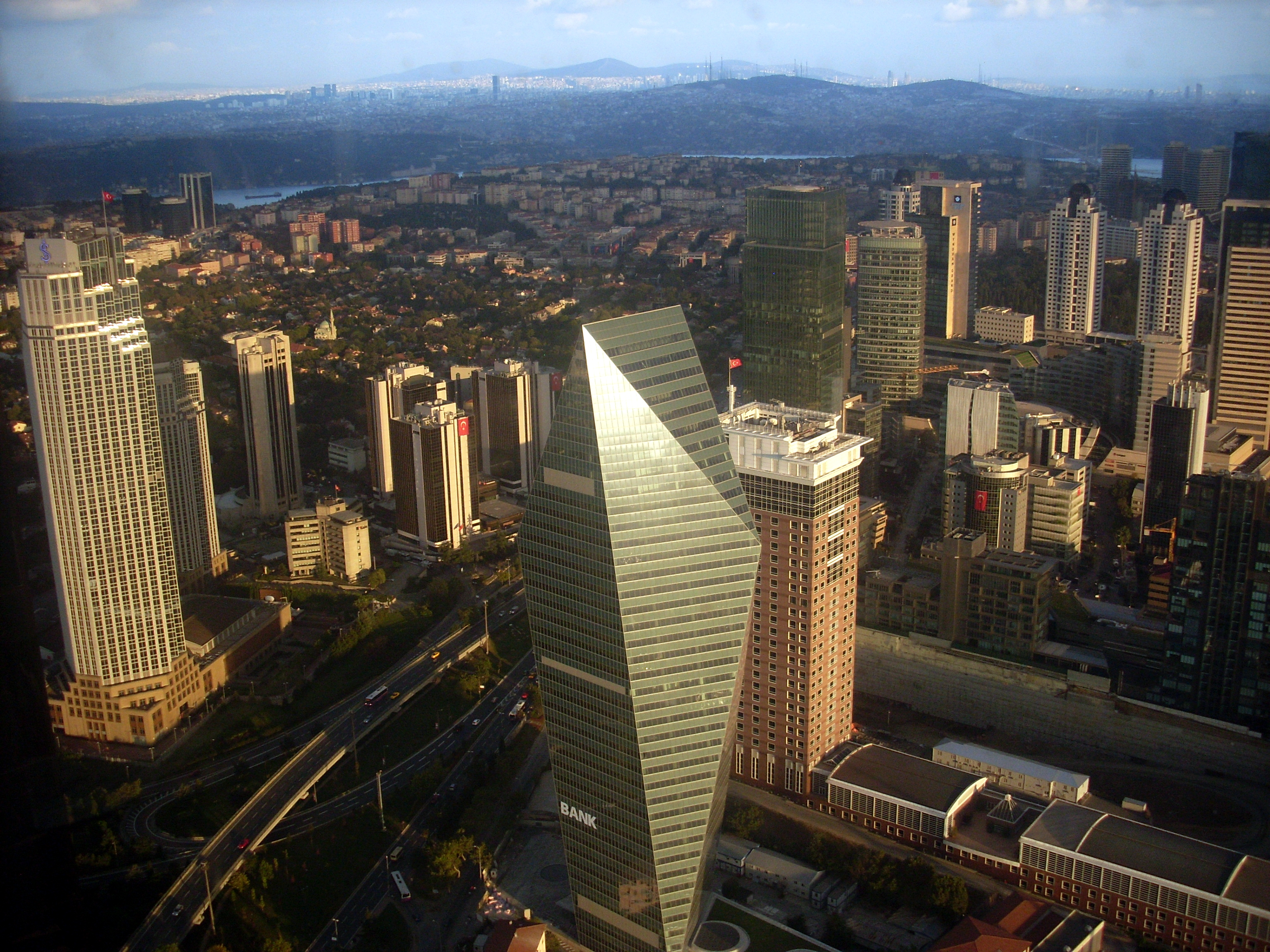
A view of Büyükdere Avenue in Levent

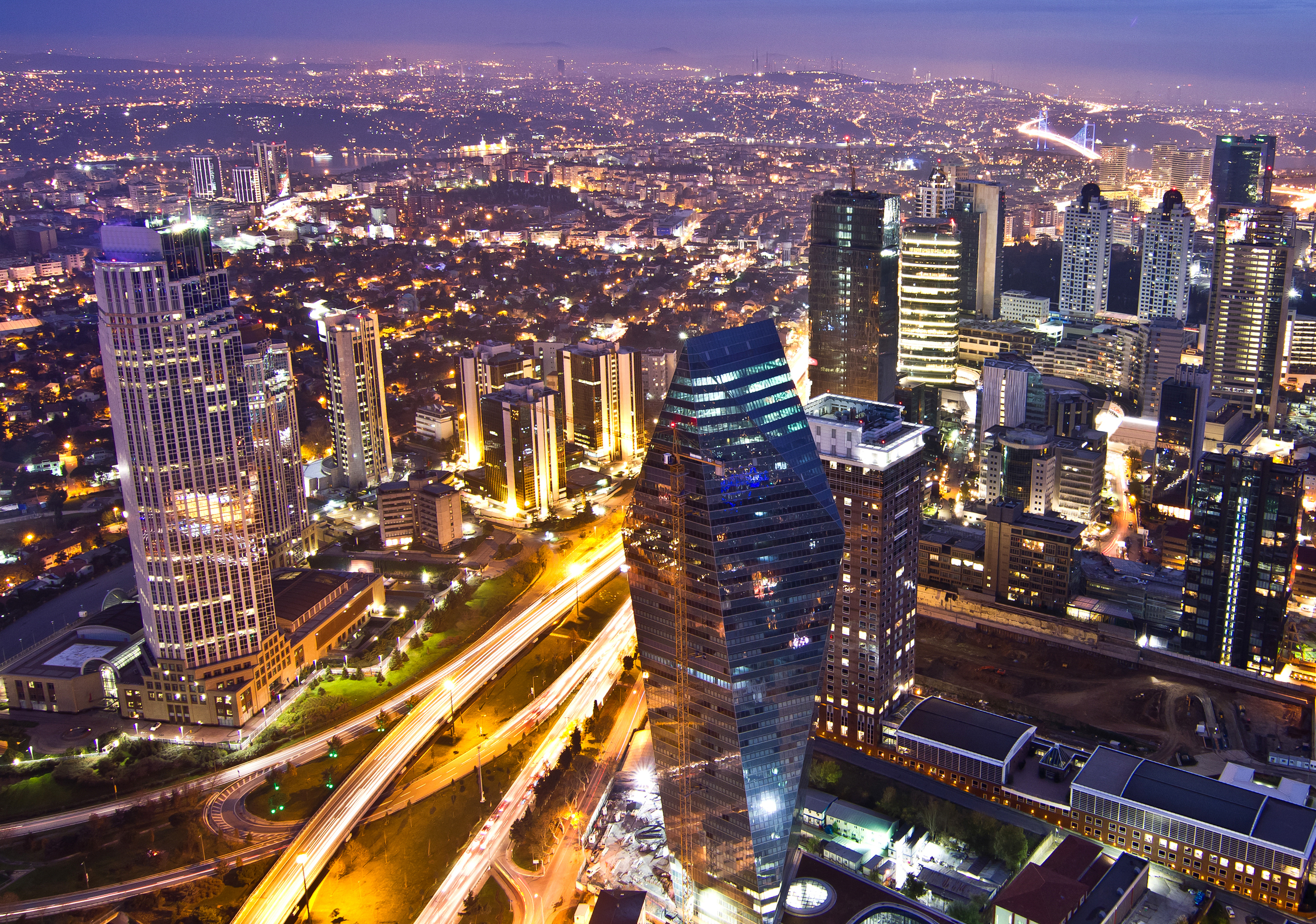
A view of Büyükdere Avenue in Levent

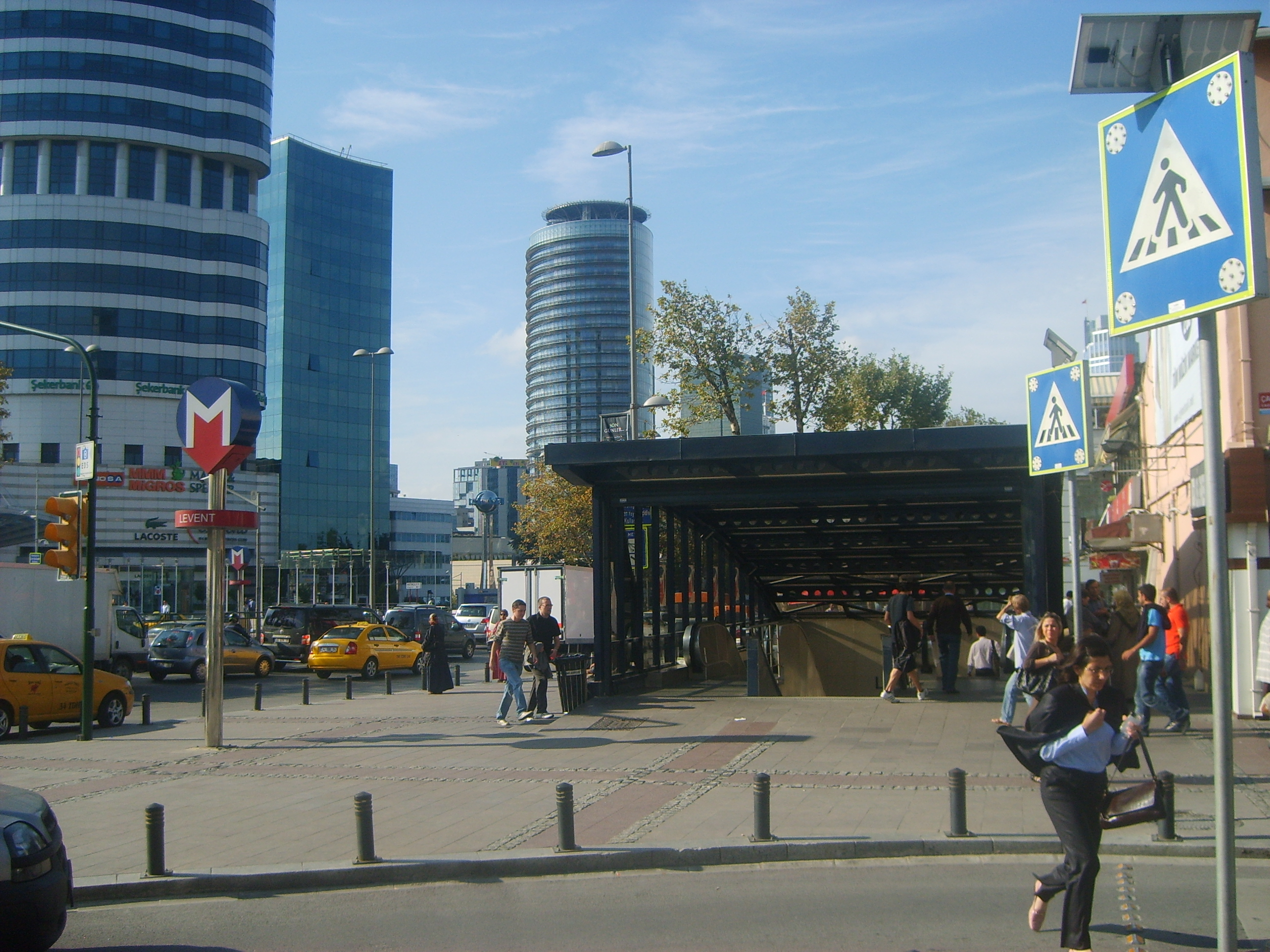
Levent station of the Istanbul Metro on Büyükdere Avenue
