= Otoyol 1 =

Highway in Turkey

O-1
- The First Beltway; 1. Çevreyolu

Route information
- Length: 24.8 km (15.4 mi)
- Existed: 1973–present

Major junctions
- West end: D.100, osmaniye in Bakırköy, Istanbul
- East end: Bağdat Ave. in Kadıköy, Istanbul

Location
- Country: Turkey
- Regions: Marmara
- Provinces: Istanbul Province
- Major cities: Istanbul

Highway system
- Highways in Turkey; Motorways; List; State Highways; List
| → O-2 |

Otoyol 1 (English: Motorway 1), abbreviated as O-1 and locally referred to as The First Beltway (Turkish: 1. Çevreyolu), is a controlled access highway in Istanbul, Turkey. The O-1 serves as the inner beltway and is one of three intercontinental motorways in the city, the others being the O-2, and O-7, as well as connecting the European and Asian parts of the city via the Bosphorus Bridge.

It starts Osmaniye neighborhood in Bakırköy district on the European part, runs through the city over the Golden Horn and the Bosphorus, and terminates in Söğütlüçeşme neighborhood of Kadıköy district on the Asian part. Otoyol 1 is toll-free, however the Bosporus Bridge is a toll bridge in both directions, having its toll plaza at the Asian side. The O-1 is connected via three feeder highways to The Second Beltway.

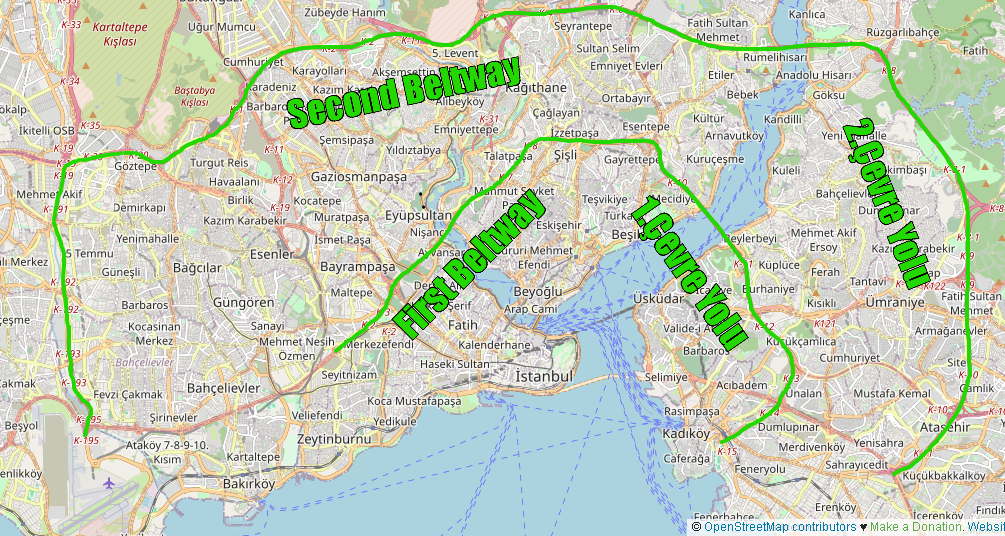
istanbul çevre yolları

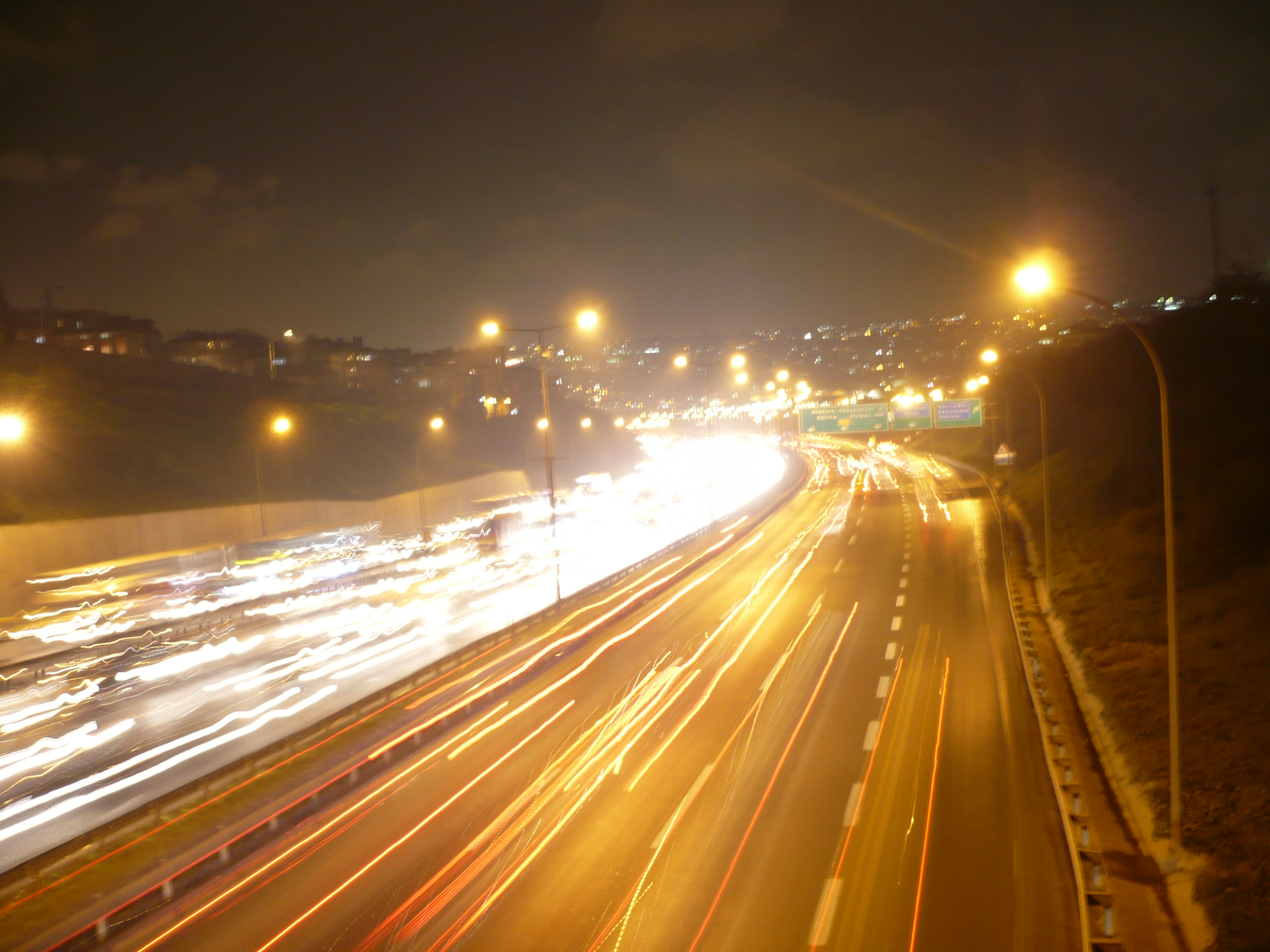
O1 Haliç Bridge Halıcıoğlu entrance

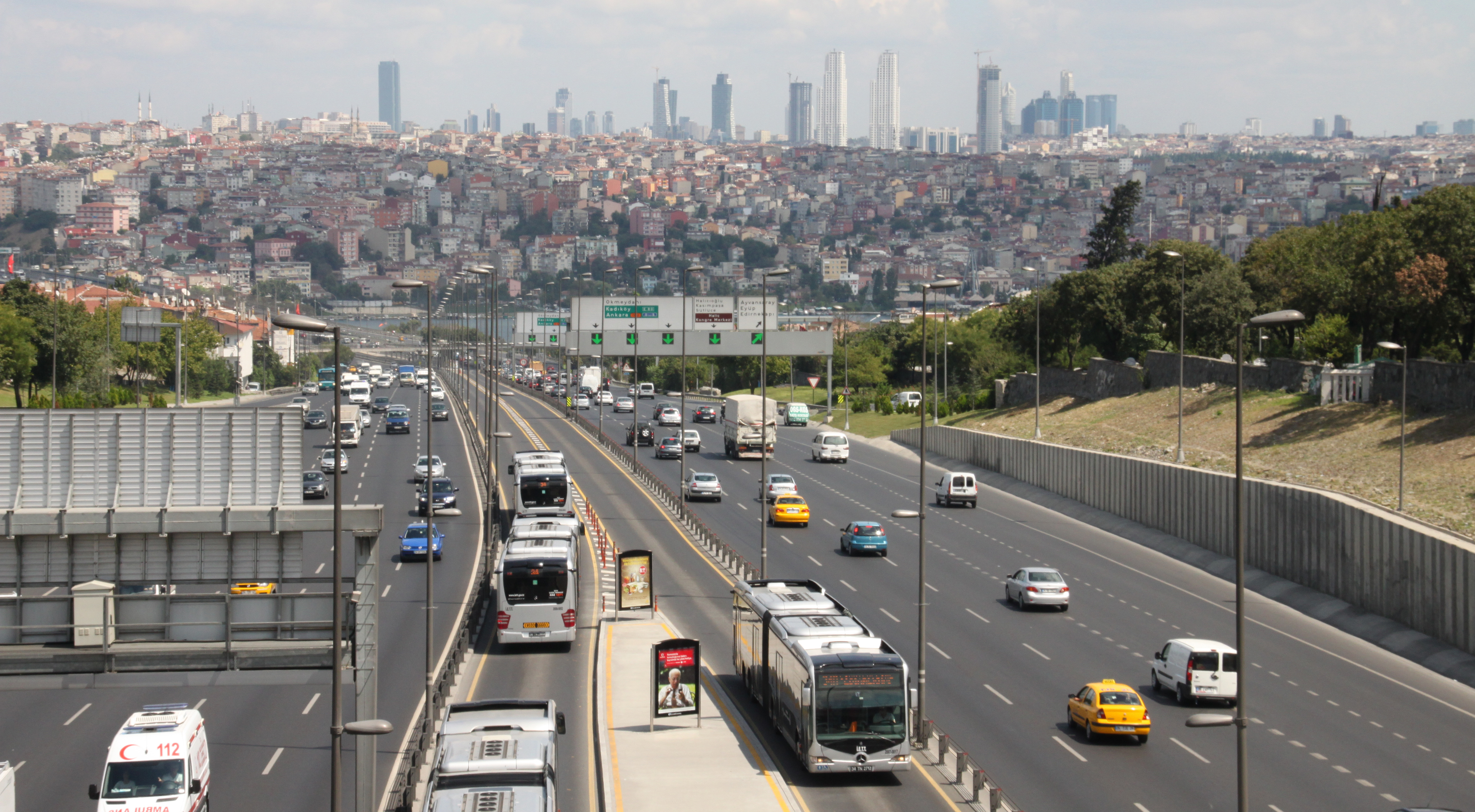
O1 Haliç Bridge Ayvansaray entrance

== Exit list ==
| Province | District | km | mi | Exit | Destinations | Notes |
|---|---|---|---|---|---|---|
| Istanbul | Bakırköy | 0.0 | 0.0 | K1 | Osmaniye junction D.100- | northbound Mehmetakif cd.southbound Ekremkurt Blv. |
| Istanbul | Zeytinburnu | 2.6 | 1.6 | K2 | Topkapı junction | northbound exit. southbound entrance |
| Istanbul | Zeytinburnu | 4.4 | 2.7 | K3 | Vatan caddesi junction | southeastbound Fatih, nourthwestbound Bayrampaşa |
| Istanbul | Eyüpsultan | 5.2 | 3.2 | K4 | Edirnekapı junction | southeastbound Fatih |
| Istanbul | Eyüpsultan | 6.1 | 3.8 | K5 | Ayvansaray junction | southeastbound Fatih |
| Istanbul | Golden Horn | 6.5 | 4.0 | Haliç Bridge | | |
| Istanbul | Beyoğlu | 7.2 | 4.5 | K6 | Halıcıoğlu junction | |
| Istanbul | Kağıthane | 8.8 | 5.5 | K7 | Okmeydanı junction | Hasdal O-2 — Okmeydanı connector |
| Istanbul | Şişli | 10.9 | 6.8 | K8 | Çağlayan junction | southbound Piyalepaşa Blv. |
| Istanbul | Beşiktaş | 13.8 | 8.6 | K9 | Barbaros junction | nourthbound Büyükdere Cd.- O-2 connection path, southbound Barbaros Blv. |
| Istanbul | Beşiktaş | 15.1 | 9.4 | K10 | Balmumcu junction | Barbaros Blv. |
| Istanbul | Bosphorus | 16.3 | 10.1 | Bosphorus Bridge (₺47.00 toll:13/01/2025) | | |
| Istanbul | Üsküdar | 18.2 | 11.3 | K11 | Beylerbeyi junction | |
| Istanbul | Üsküdar | 19.5 | 12.1 | K12 | Altunizade junction | eastbound Ümraniye- O-2 connection path |
| Istanbul | Üsküdar | 21.4 | 13.3 | K13 | Çamlıca junction | O-2, O-4 Kocaeli Province Ankara |
| Istanbul | Üsküdar | 22.8 | 14.2 | K14 | Uzunçayır junction | D.100 Kocaeli Province Ankara |
| Istanbul | Kadıköy | 24.8 | 15.4 | K15 | Söğütlüçeşme junction | Bağdat Cd. |
1.000 mi = 1.609 km; 1.000 km = 0.621 mi: Tolled

== See also ==
- List of highways in Turkey
