= Barbaros Boulevard =

Street in Istanbul, Turkey

Coordinates: 41°03′17″N 29°00′34″E

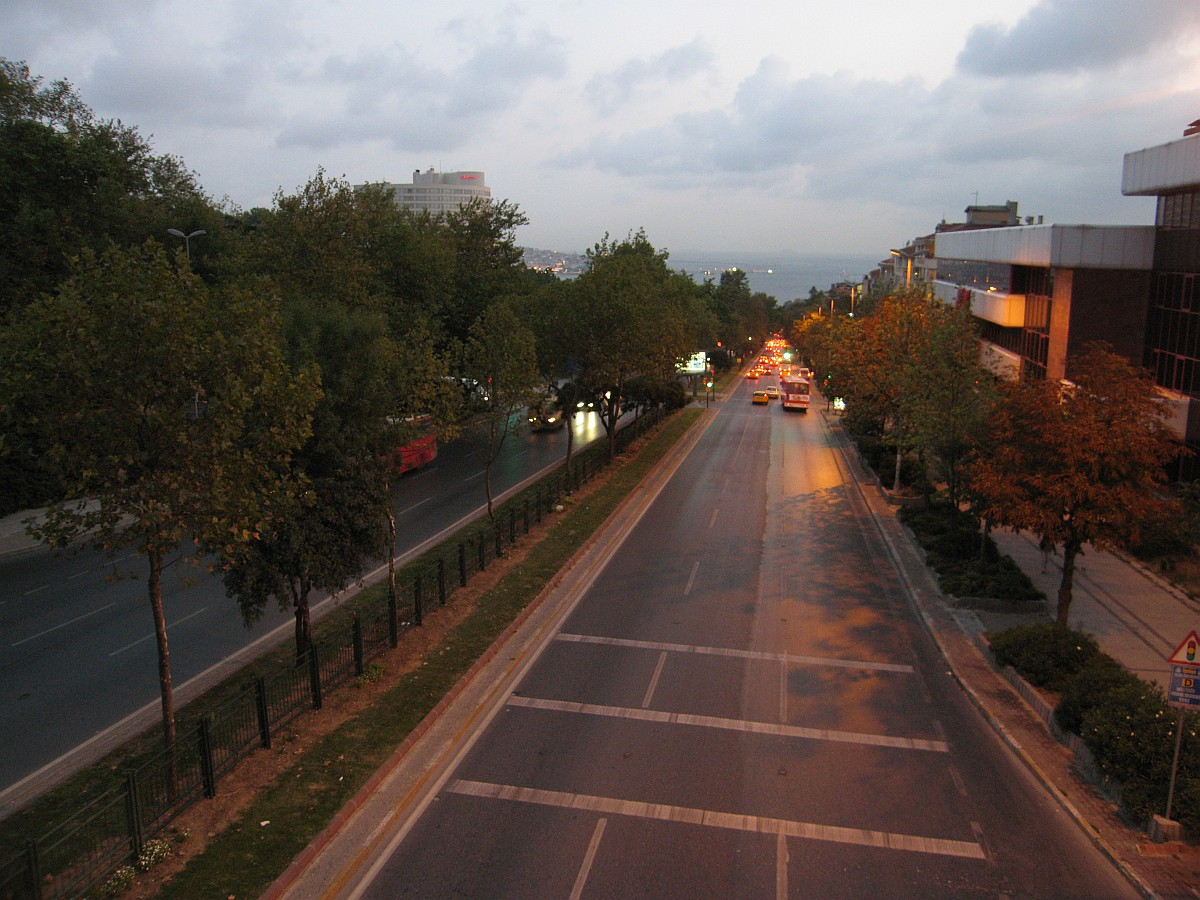
A view of Barbaros Boulevard seen from Yıldız towards Beşiktaş.

The Barbaros Boulevard (Turkish: Barbaros Bulvarı) is a 3.1 km (1.9 mi)-long major street in the Beşiktaş district on the European side of Istanbul, Turkey. It runs in a straight line in south–north direction from Beşiktaş Square over Yıldız up to Zincirlikuyu, where it passes over to Büyükdere Avenue. It is named after the Ottoman admiral of the fleet Hayreddin Barbarossa (Turkish: Barbaros Hayrettin Paşa) (c. 1478–1546), whose tomb is located in Beşiktaş.

It is a major artery of the Istanbul Central Business District, which is not located in the historic center of the city, but rather north of Taksim Square.

The 1.5 km (0.93 mi) long boulevard ascends a slope from 1.5 m (4.9 ft) elevation at Beşiktaş Square up to 135 m (443 ft) at Balmumcu before Zincirlikuyu. This part of the street is 50 m (160 ft) wide with a slope gradient of 8%, while the part between Balmumcu and Zincirlikuyu has a width of 30 m (98 ft) and a slope gradient of 2–3%.

== History ==
The construction of the boulevard began in 1957, within the urban redevelopment project for Istanbul by Italian city planner, Luigi Piccinato initiated by Prime Minister Adnan Menderes (1899–1961). Opened to traffic in 1958, the street was initially called Yıldız Yokuşu (Yıldız Slope) or Yıldız Yolu (Yıldız Road); since it passes through the Yıldız neighborhood.

Its importance grew as it was connected to the 1973-built Bosphorus Bridge, which became the first direct route between the two sides on the Istanbul Strait. It serves as a feeder for the Bosphorus Bridge, which carries the inner-city motorway O-1.
