= 2025 Republican People's Party presidential primary =

Selection of 2028 presidential candidate in Turkey

- 23 March 2025
- Turnout: 94.5% (party members)
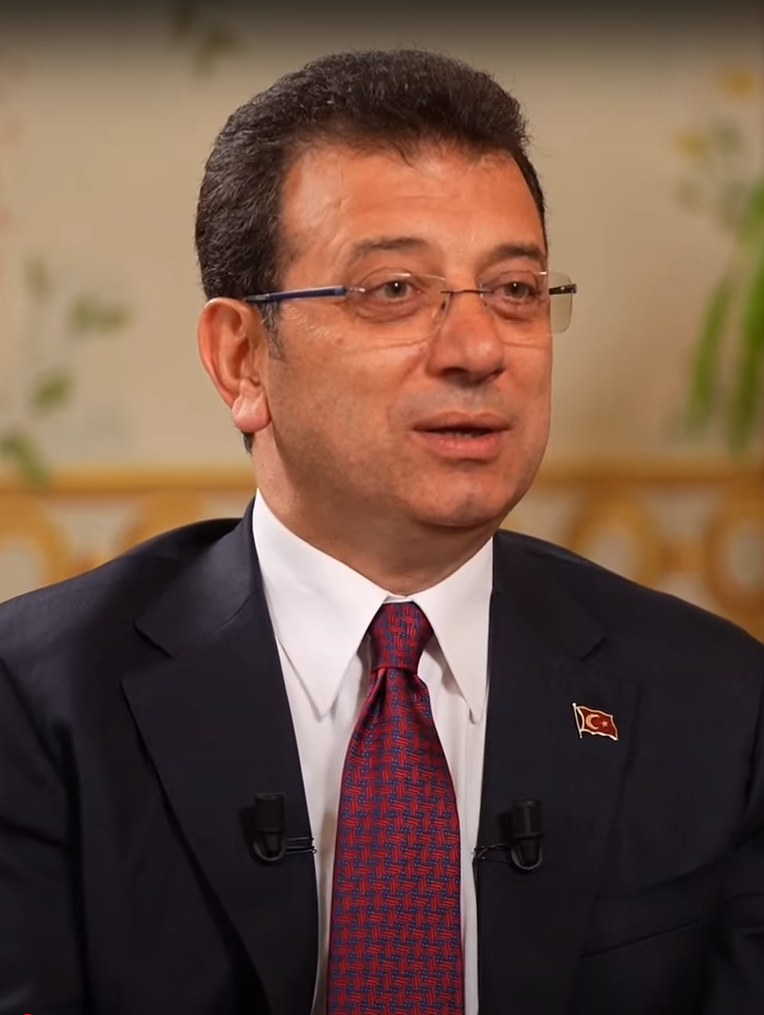
Nominee	Ekrem İmamoğlu
Members of parliament	116 (87.2%)
Party member vote	1,653,887
General public vote	13,844,070
Total vote	15,497,957

In 2025 the Republican People's Party chose Ekrem İmamoğlu, the mayor of Istanbul, as their candidate for the next Turkish presidential election. He was arrested the same day and charged with corruption, leading to major protests.

Following the defeat of Kemal Kılıçdaroğlu, then the Republican People's Party (CHP) leader, to the incumbent Recep Tayyip Erdoğan in the 2023 presidential election the party discussed what to do. Eventually they elected a new leader, Özgür Özel, and in the 2024 local elections took control of several city councils. Mayors of the governing conservative Justice and Development Party (AKP) lost to the social democratic CHP’s Mansur Yavaş in the capital Ankara, and to İmamoğlu in the largest city Istanbul.

As the government might call the next presidential election before its 2028 deadline, the CHP decided to hold a primary in March 2025 to choose their candidate. After some public and private politicking Özel and Yavaş decided not to stand. Following the withdrawal of minor candidate Dursun Çiçek for family reasons, only İmamoğlu was left in the primary.

The constitution requires the president to have graduated from higher education, but a few days before the primary Istanbul University cancelled İmamoğlu’s degree. The CHP accused the government of pressuring the university, and asked all Turks to symbolically vote for democracy in the primary. On the morning of the day of the primary İmamoğlu was arrested and later charged with corruption. The government says that the justice system is independent of the president, but many disagree. Almost all of the 1,7 million CHP members voted, along with 13,8 million others, for a total of 15,5 million people. As of late-March 2025 İmamoğlu remains the party’s presidential candidate and is in prison awaiting trial.

== Background ==
The morning after the 2023 Turkish presidential election, Ekrem İmamoğlu posted a video on Twitter, calling for change in the social democratic main opposition Republican People's Party (CHP) and Turkey. In July 2023, part of a Zoom conference between İmamoğlu and other prominent CHP politicians, discussing the future strategies of the party, was leaked on YouTube. The meeting was held without the knowledge of the then leader of the party, Kemal Kılıçdaroğlu, and it sparked outrage from some factions in the party.

Meanwhile, Reformists (Turkish: Değişimciler), a group within the CHP that did not approve of Kılıçdaroğlu's leadership, announced a website called "İktidar İçin Değişim", expressing the future strategies for both the CHP and Turkey. The manifesto focused on change in opposition and emphasized democratization, inclusivity, and mass participation in the decision-making process.

The 38th Republican People's Party Ordinary Convention was originally set for summer 2022, but was postponed to November 2023 due to national COVID-19 measures. At the convention the party leadership was won by Özgür Özel, by first a slight margin, but then a landslide in the runoff. Following the change in the office, CHP introduced many changes in its internal rules, including a term limit for MPs, a 50% women and 30% youth quota in internal bodies, wider representation for disabled people, and primaries.

=== 2024 Turkish local elections ===
Under the new leadership the CHP won an unexpected victory in local elections, defeating Erdoğan's AK Party for the first time in two decades. In addition to mayors, the party also won majorities in the municipal councils of many key cities, such as Istanbul and Ankara, which made it easier for the already in place CHP mayors in Istanbul and Ankara.

With the support of these new people Ekrem İmamoğlu was elected the President of the Turkish Municipalities Union by a landslide margin, handing over a central government body to the CHP for the first time since 1977.

== Nomination process ==
In accordance with the CHP's recently-introduced Primary Directive (Turkish: Önseçim Yönergesi), commencement of the applications was set for 17 February 2025. The next day, Özgür Özel, at the weekly group meeting, remarked that there is an ongoing "coup attempt" against the "next President of Turkey", favoring Ekrem İmamoğlu through referring to judicial repressions against him, without directly naming him.

Registered CHP members who meet the conditions as stated in the Presidential Election Law of 2012 (Turkish: Cumhurbaşkanlığı Seçimi Kanunu) are eligible to attend the primary election. These are summarized below:

- At least forty years of age,
- Graduate of an accredited higher education institution,
- Eligible to be elected to parliament.

Candidate	Votes	Signatories
Ekrem İmamoğlu	116/20	Elvan Işık Gezmiş, Ayça Taşkent, Süleyman Bülbül, Harun Yıldızlı, Mühip Kanko, Nail Çiler, Servet Mullaoğlu, İbrahim Arslan, Serkan Sarı, Ayhan Barut, Sezgin Tanrıkulu, Sibel Suiçmez, İzzet Akbulut, Cavit Arı, Ahmet Baran Yazgan, Nurhayat Kayışoğlu, Ali Gökçek, Ednan Arslan, Yaşar Tüzün Declared eligible: 18 February 2025
Dursun Çiçek	5/20	

== Voting procedure ==
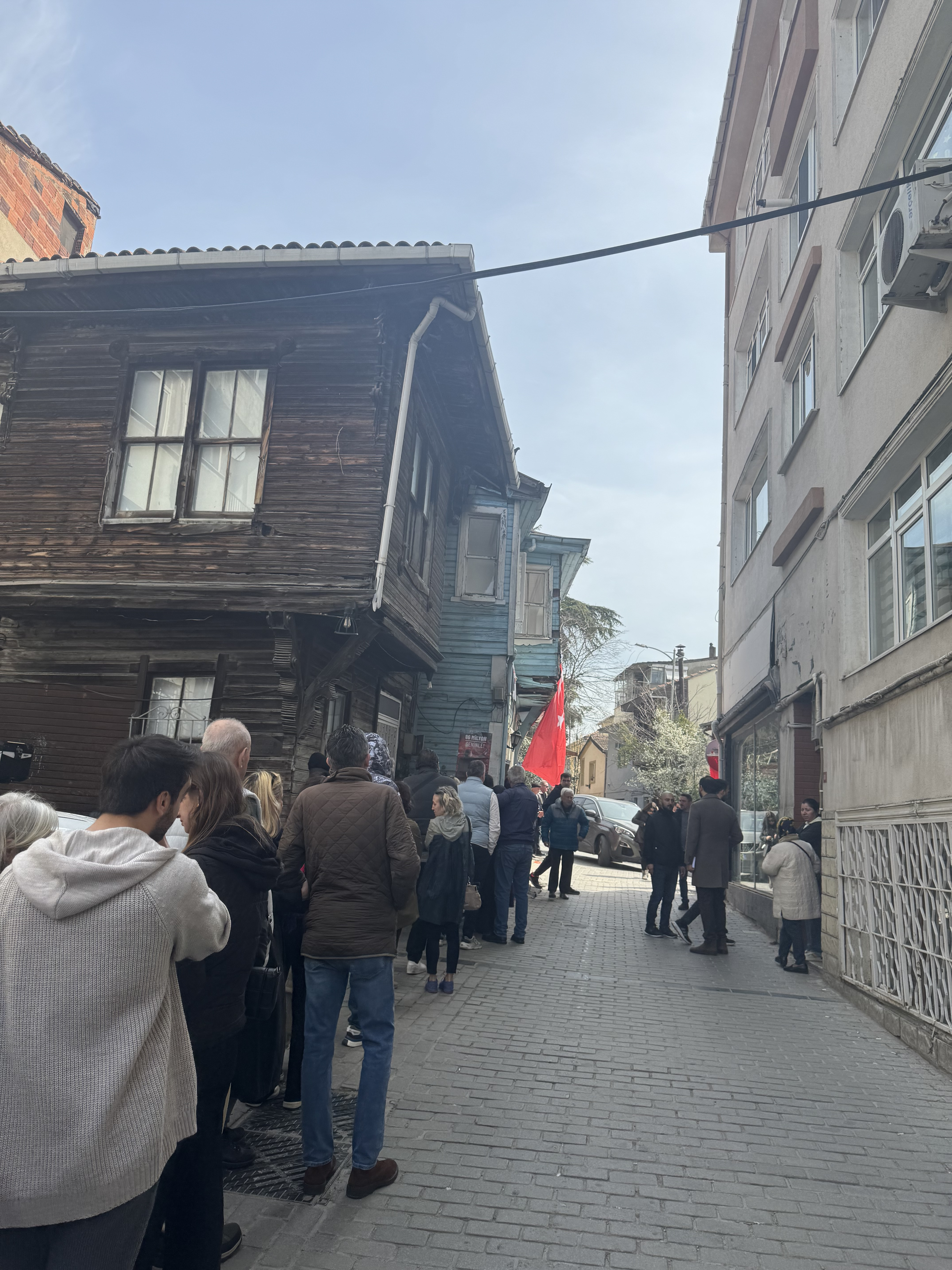
People queueing to vote in Çengelköy

Some details were explained by Özgür Özel in January 2025.

- According to the Court of Cassation, the CHP had 1,531,944 registered members eligible to vote. Furthermore, Özel invited everyone to join the party before the end of February to participate in the election. He later told the media that online registrations were 10-12 times up and local offices would stay open on the weekends to meet the intense attention.

== Candidates ==
=== Declared ===
Ekrem İmamoğlu was the incumbent Mayor of Istanbul and the President of the Turkish Municipalities Union. On 17 February, though he had not announced his bid yet, dozens of MPs and many mayors endorsed İmamoğlu's candidacy. Four days later he openly declared for the primary.

Dursun Çiçek is a former officer in the Turkish Navy and a former MP for the CHP. He first declared his candidacy on a television program, remarking that a democratic election requires multiple candidates. He managed to gather 5 of 20 required signatories, but had to withdraw as his wife fell sick.

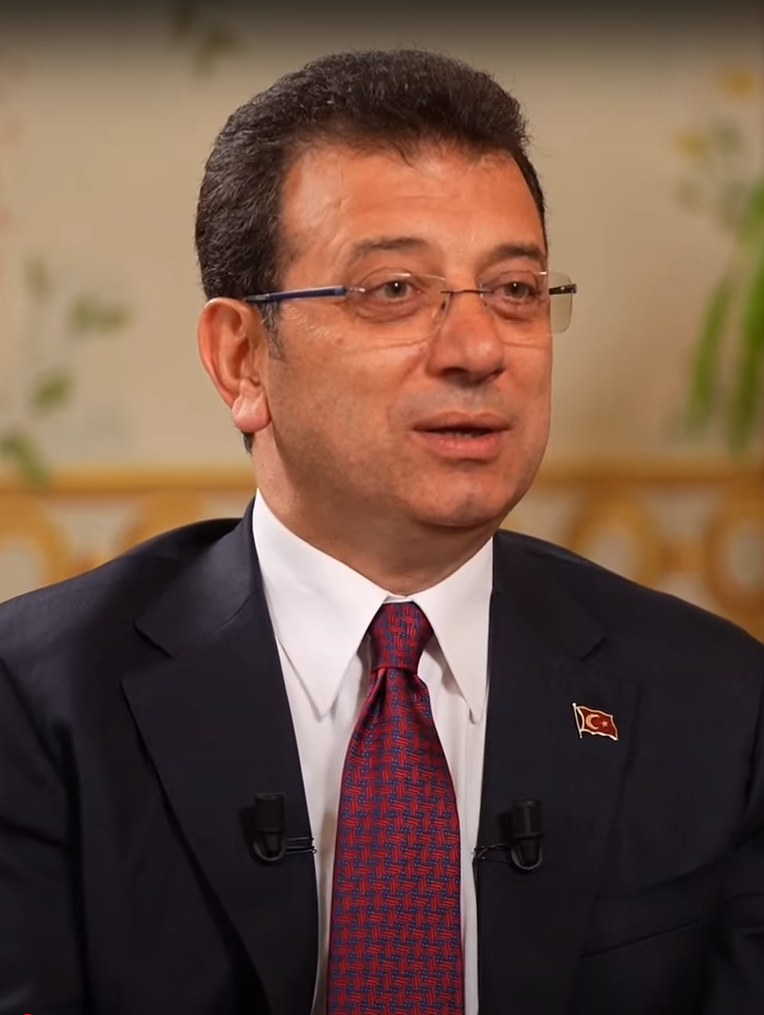
Mayor of Istanbul
Ekrem İmamoğlu

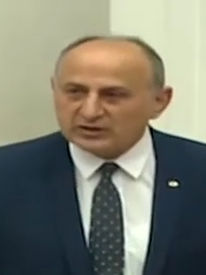
Former Member of Parliament
Dursun Çiçek

=== Declined ===
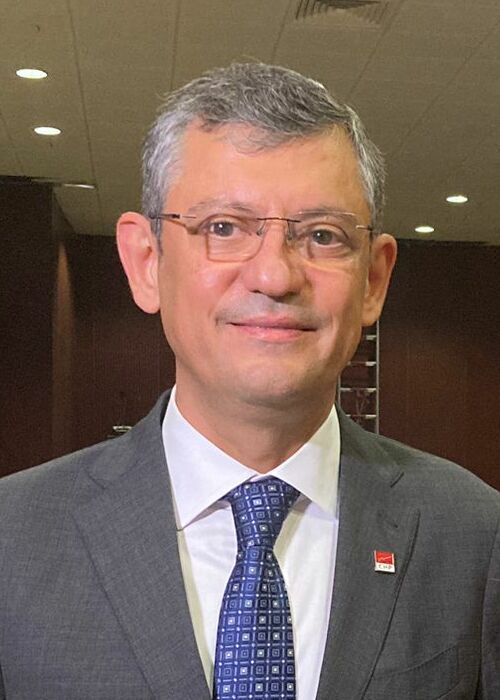
Leader of the Republican People's Party
Özgür Özel

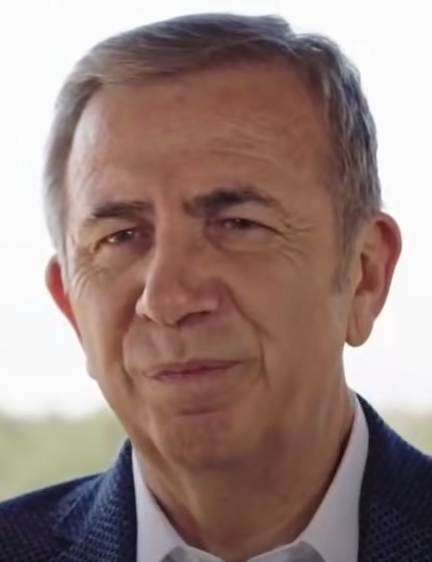
Mayor of Ankara
Mansur Yavaş

== Controversies ==
=== Mansur Yavaş candidacy dispute ===
Though Ekrem İmamoğlu and other "reformists" were pushing for a snap election, Mansur Yavaş insisted that it was "too early" to determine the candidate, and the CHP should instead focus on poverty. It was speculated that Yavaş, despite his public support, as a Nationalist Movement Party MP who joined CHP later in his career had no chance against İmamoğlu and thus he hesitated to stand as a defeat could damage his image.

On 9 January 2025, amidst the intense discussions on his position, Yavaş, İmamoğlu, and Özel arranged for a dinner where they resolved the dispute. It was later reported that Yavaş would not run in the primary. Though Yavaş believed that a primary might cause disorder in the party, and the CHP should determine its candidate through public opinion polls, he refuted the speculation which he later called "black propaganda" that he would run independently. On 11 January, he posted on social media, emphasizing that all are "one and together" for the beautiful days and the restoration of parliamentary democracy.

== Results ==
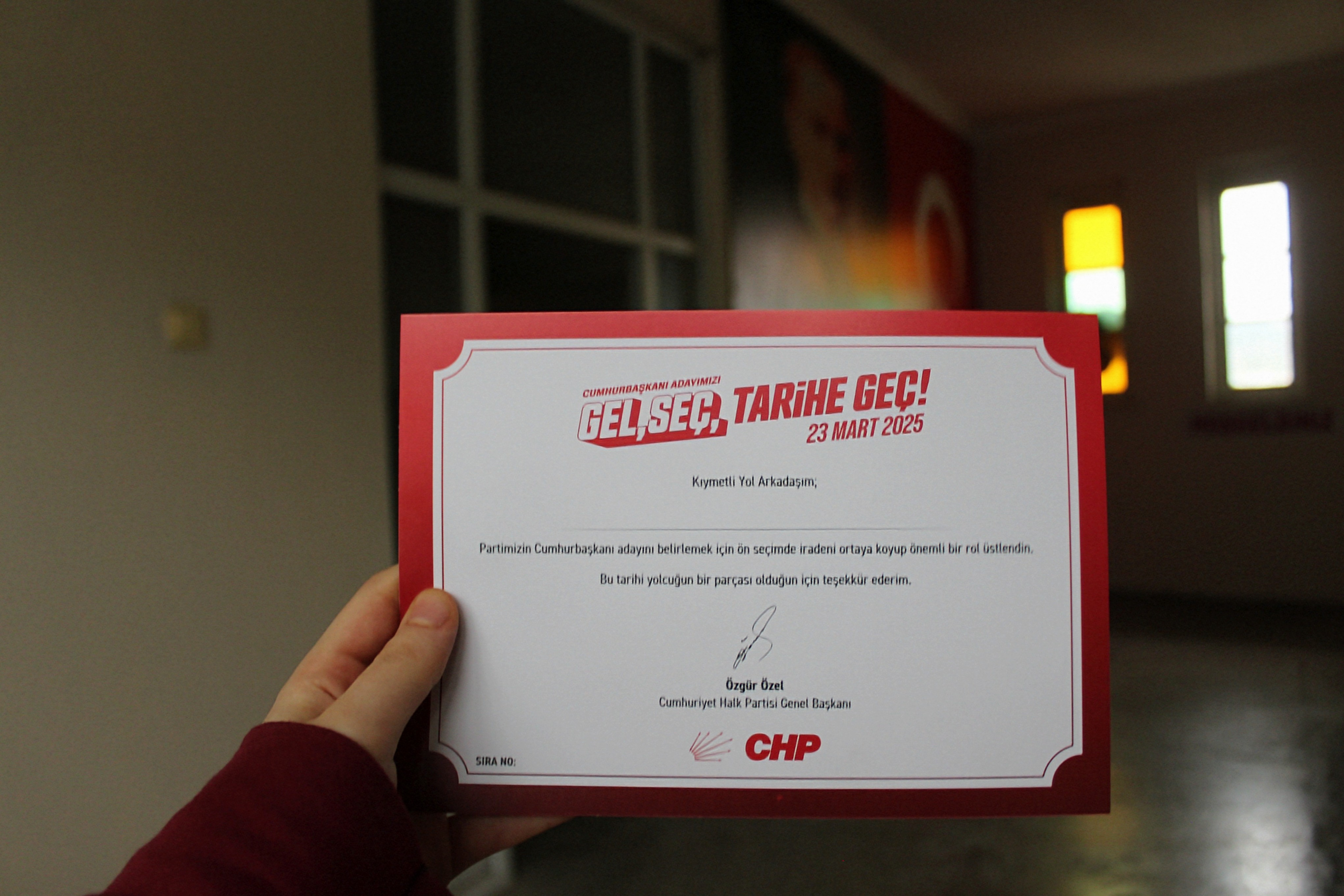
Commemorative certificate given to voters.

İmamoğlu was widely considered the top contender for the CHP nomination, but his candidacy was thrown into doubt after the cancellation of his degree by Istanbul University, due to alleged irregularities, and his subsequent arrest on charges of corruption. Protests broke out all across Turkey in the aftermath of the detention of Imamoglu.

The primary took place on 23 March 2025. That evening CHP chairman Özgür Özel announced to demonstrators in Istanbul that 1.6 million of the 1.7 million CHP members had voted for İmamoğlu and that over 13 million other Turks voted in solidarity.

Presidential primary results
Candidate	Party ballot	Solidarity ballot	Total
Ekrem İmamoğlu	1,653,887	13,844,070	15,497,957
Invalid or blank vote	—	—	—
Voter turnout	%94.51 (party members)		
