= Agriculture in Turkey =

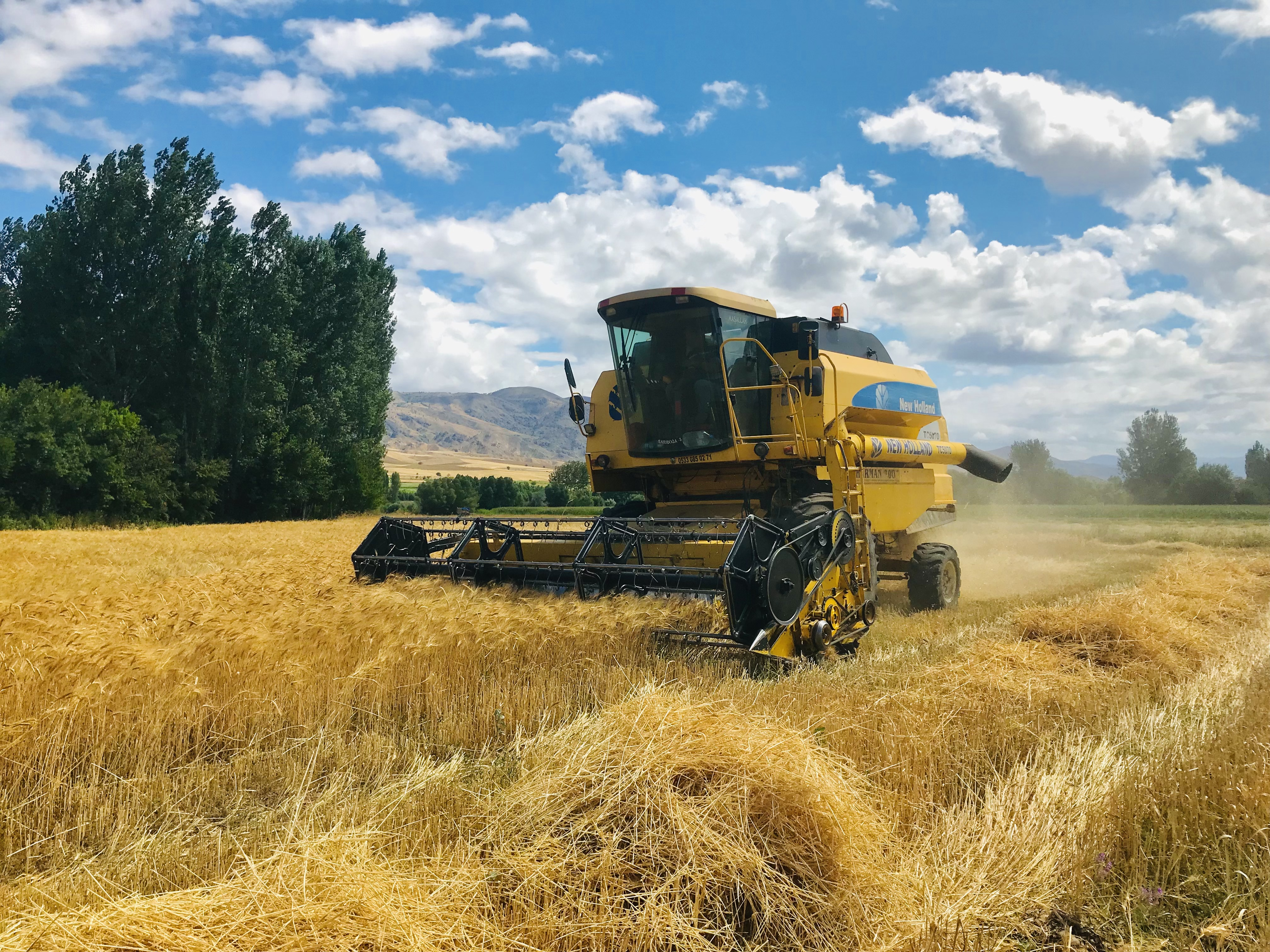
Wheat harvest in Sivas Province

Agriculture is still an important sector of Turkey's economy, and the country is one of the world's top ten agricultural producers. Wheat, sugar beet, milk, poultry, cotton, vegetables and fruit are major products; and Turkey is the world's largest grower of hazelnuts, apricots, and oregano. Almost all the seeds used in Turkey are produced domestically.

Half of Turkey's land is agricultural, and farming employs about 15% of the workforce, but under half a million farmers. It provides about 10% of exports and over 5% of gross domestic product (GDP). Over 380 billion lira of agricultural subsidy is budgeted for 2024.

Despite being a major food producer, Turkey is a net wheat importer, much of it coming from Russia and Ukraine. Turkey is the European Union's fourth largest vegetable supplier and seventh largest fruit supplier. Turkey would like to extend the EU Customs Union Agreement to agricultural products.

Around half of Turkey's agricultural greenhouse gas is due to cattle. (Note: Total 72 Mt: 27 Mt enteric fermentation + 61% of 9 Mt manure management = 32 Mt + unknown share of agricultural soils.) According to the World Bank, the sector should adapt more to climate change in Turkey and make technical improvements. The Ministry of Agriculture and Forestry has a strategic plan to 2028.

== History ==
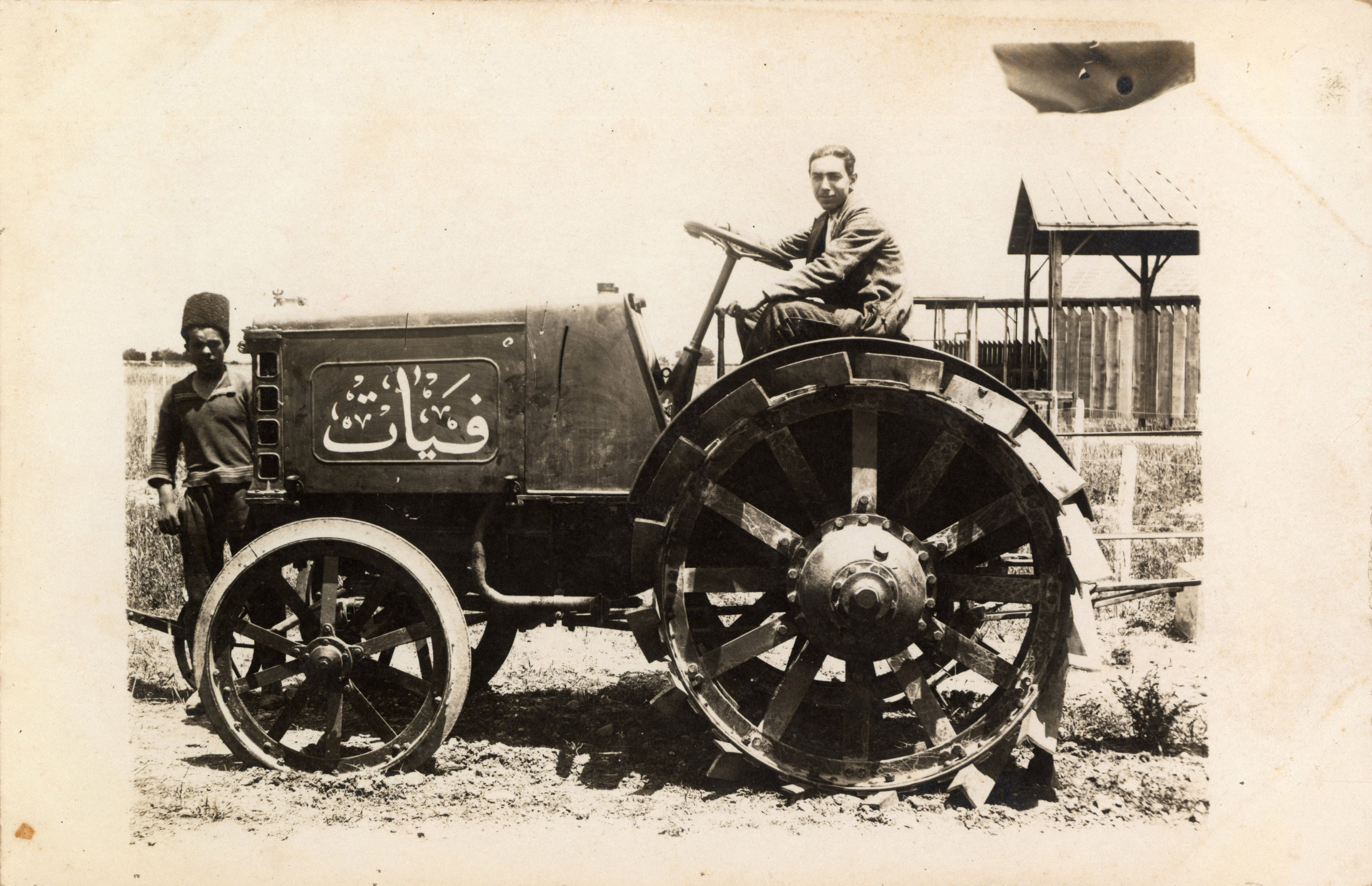
International Agricultural Fair in Adana in 1924

Historically, Turkey's farmers have been fairly fragmented. Atatürk, who founded the republic in the early 20th century, said that the foundation of the economy was agriculture. Governments initiated many projects, such as the controversial Southeastern Anatolia Project, but later much agriculture was privatized.

The population increased a lot in the 20th century, so there was more demand for food and agricultural land. From 1880 to 1950 agricultural output growth averaged about 1% a year, in line with the increased population having new land. Then growth accelerated as more land could be cultivated because there were many more machines, such as tractors – for example due to the Marshall Plan. By the 1970s higher yielding varieties of wheat had been planted, but einkorn continued to be consumed by locals.

The increase in agricultural land continued until the 1990s when it started to decrease. Like many other countries Turkey industrialized and urbanized, and by the end of the 20th century only 35% of employment and 13% of GDP was from agriculture.

Formerly widespread in the west and centre of the country, in 1933 opium growing was strictly controlled. In the 20th century growing tobacco was economically important in provinces such as Samsun, and was supported by the state, but in the early 21st century it was discouraged by governments keen to reduce smoking in Turkey. During the early 21st century farmers shifted to growing more profitable crops such as fruit and vegetables, instead of wheat and corn.

== Environment ==
=== Issues ===
Half of Turkey's land is agricultural. Turkish agriculture emits greenhouse gases half from cattle. Since at least 1990 enteric fermentation (cows and sheep belching methane) has been the largest source of greenhouse gas emissions from agriculture, followed by agricultural soils. According to the World Bank, the sector should adapt more to climate change in Turkey and make technical improvements. The Aegean Region may be the most at risk from climate change. However coffee can now be grown in the country.

14% of food was lost during agricultural processing in 2016, compared to 23% trashed by consumers before eating and 5% leftovers. Stubble burning is illegal in Turkey, but farmers continue the practice illicitly. Deliberate burning of field residue can cause wildfires in Turkey. Agriculture on steep land can increase the risk of flooding. In 2020 over 900 thousand tonnes of ammonia was emitted.

=== Water ===
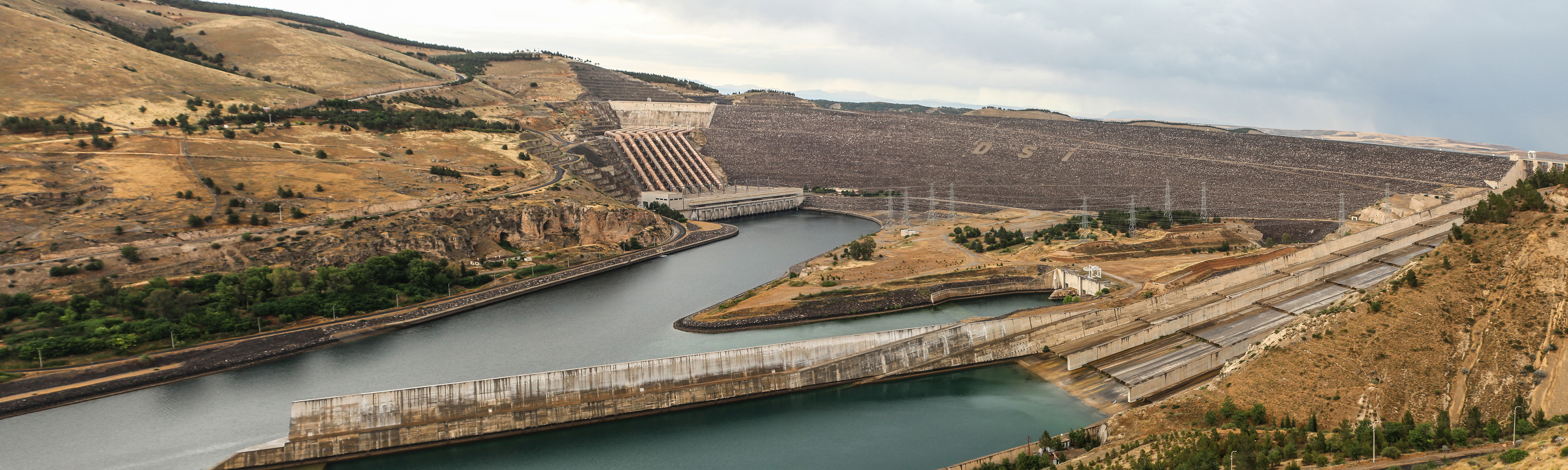
The Atatürk Dam is the largest of the 22 dams in the Southeastern Anatolia Project, which includes the irrigation of 1.82 million hectares of land.

At around 1300 m^{3} freshwater per person per year, Turkey is water-stressed and at risk of water scarcity, mainly due to wasteful irrigation. Water pricing is being considered. Desertification has been modelled and the risk has been mapped, showing that high-risk regions are Karapınar, Aralık, Ceylanpınar and Lake Tuz basins. Solar power is occasionally used to pump water to combat drought, which can reduce planting of crops such as corn and potatoes. The irrigation part of the Eastern Anatolia Project is controversial.

Farmers mostly use surface irrigation, which loses 35% to 60% of water through evaporation, seepage, and leakage. This old-fashioned irrigation may quickly deplete groundwater and run off the farm. Runoff is causing nitrogen pollution in some river basins. This can cause eutrophication which threatens aquatic life and a project is ongoing to map and combat this. As of 2023 73% of Turkey's water supply is used for irrigation, and it has been estimated that this is double what it would be if all farmers used drip irrigation. Farmers are reluctant because of the installation cost of drip installation, and more government support has been suggested. Shrinking lakes have been blamed both on reduced precipitation due to climate change and incorrect crops using more water, such as corn and sugar beet. Most irrigation is managed by unions. Charging for water used by agriculture has been suggested. Some farmers complain that drip irrigation is too expensive. Olives need less irrigation than pistachios, almonds and grapes. There is much more scope for water efficiency improvements in agriculture than other sectors.

=== Regions and soils ===
The most important regions for agriculture are the Mediterranean, Aegean, Black Sea, Thrace and Marmara, Central Anatolia, Eastern Anatolia and transition regions.

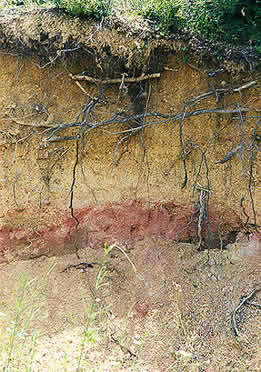
Soil profile with oxidation in Manisa Province, Turkey

The main types of soil in Turkey are calcisols, cambisols and leptosols, and fluvisols. The government says that "Soil is an indispensable form of natural capital for food security, sustainable water resources, biodiversity conservation, carbon storage and adaptation to climate change."

By the mid-20th century erosion had reduced the amount of arable land, but the government is combating desertification and erosion in various ways. However, soil erosion continues in the 21st century and is forecast to increase with climate change, with about 30% occurring on agricultural land. Degraded soil could be improved.Soil surveys have been done at least since the 1950s, and the Ministry of Agriculture has published soil maps.

The Turkish Foundation for Combating Soil Erosion is a non-governmental organization as is the Soil Science Society of Turkey. A 2016 study said soil had been degraded and that there was great potential to sequester carbon. There is a soil database (Toprak Bilge Sistem) but a user-id is required for the website. Increasing soil organic carbon (SOC) in agricultural soils is important, and in 2017 total SOC down to 0.7 m was estimated at 9.23 Pg. Another estimate is slightly under 3000 tonnes/km^{2}. SOC is being measured and mapped. Accumulation of soil organic matter depends partly on cultivation but can be hindered by aridity.

== Crops ==
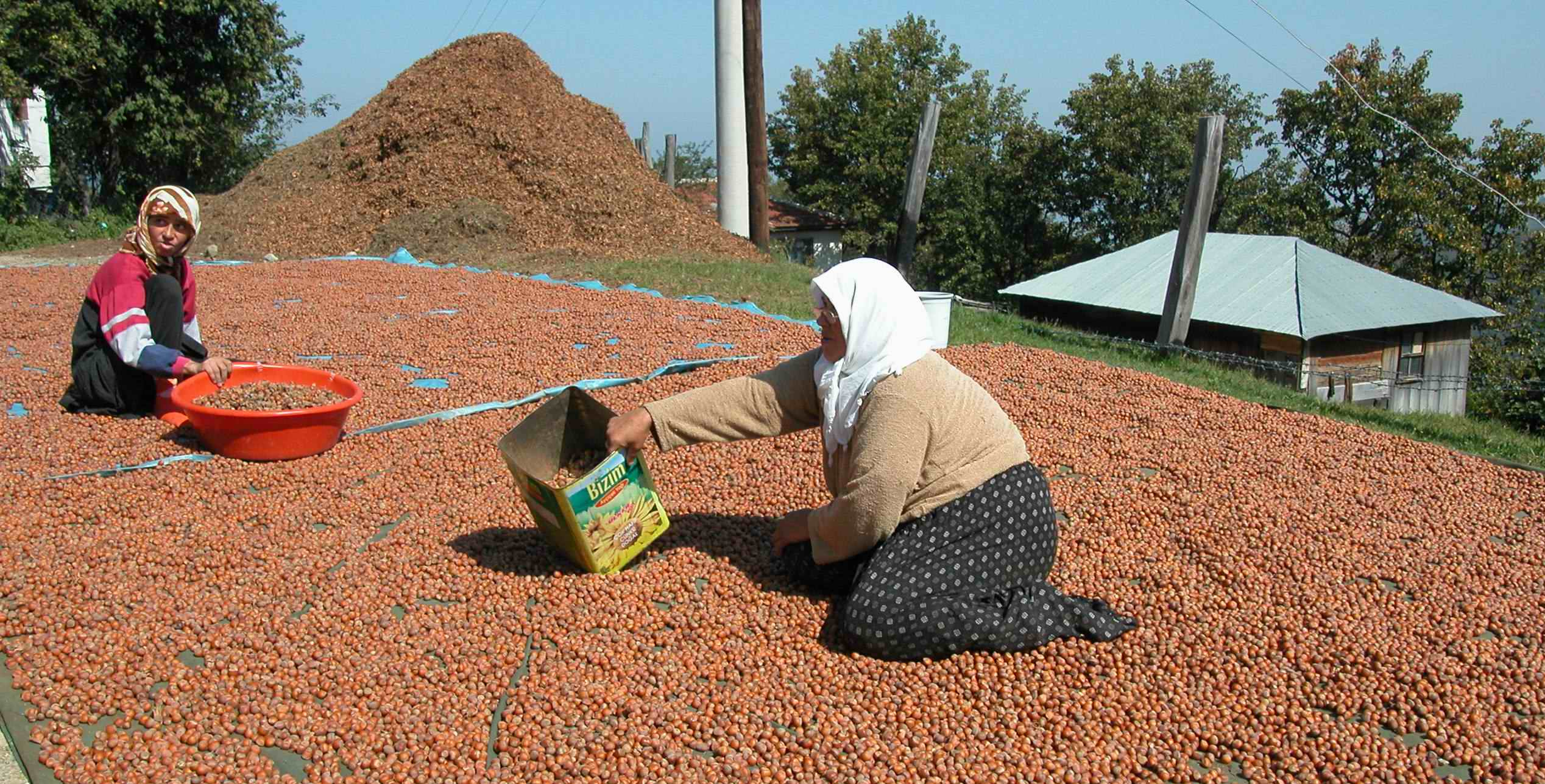
Women drying hazelnuts in Düzce Province in northwestern Turkey

Crops can be grown in all regions and there is livestock on high mountains and in arid regions. Wheat, sugar beet, cotton, vegetables and fruit are major crops; and Turkey is the world's largest grower of hazelnuts, apricots, oregano and raisins.

As of 2023 most cultivated land is for grain. In 2022 70 million tonnes of cereals and other crops were produced; 32 million tonnes of vegetables; and 27 million tonnes of fruit, beverages and spice crops; and the country was self-sufficient in rapeseed, dry beans, potatoes and sugar beet and almost all fruits and vegetables. Due to rotation a third of arable land is fallow each year.

=== Cereals ===
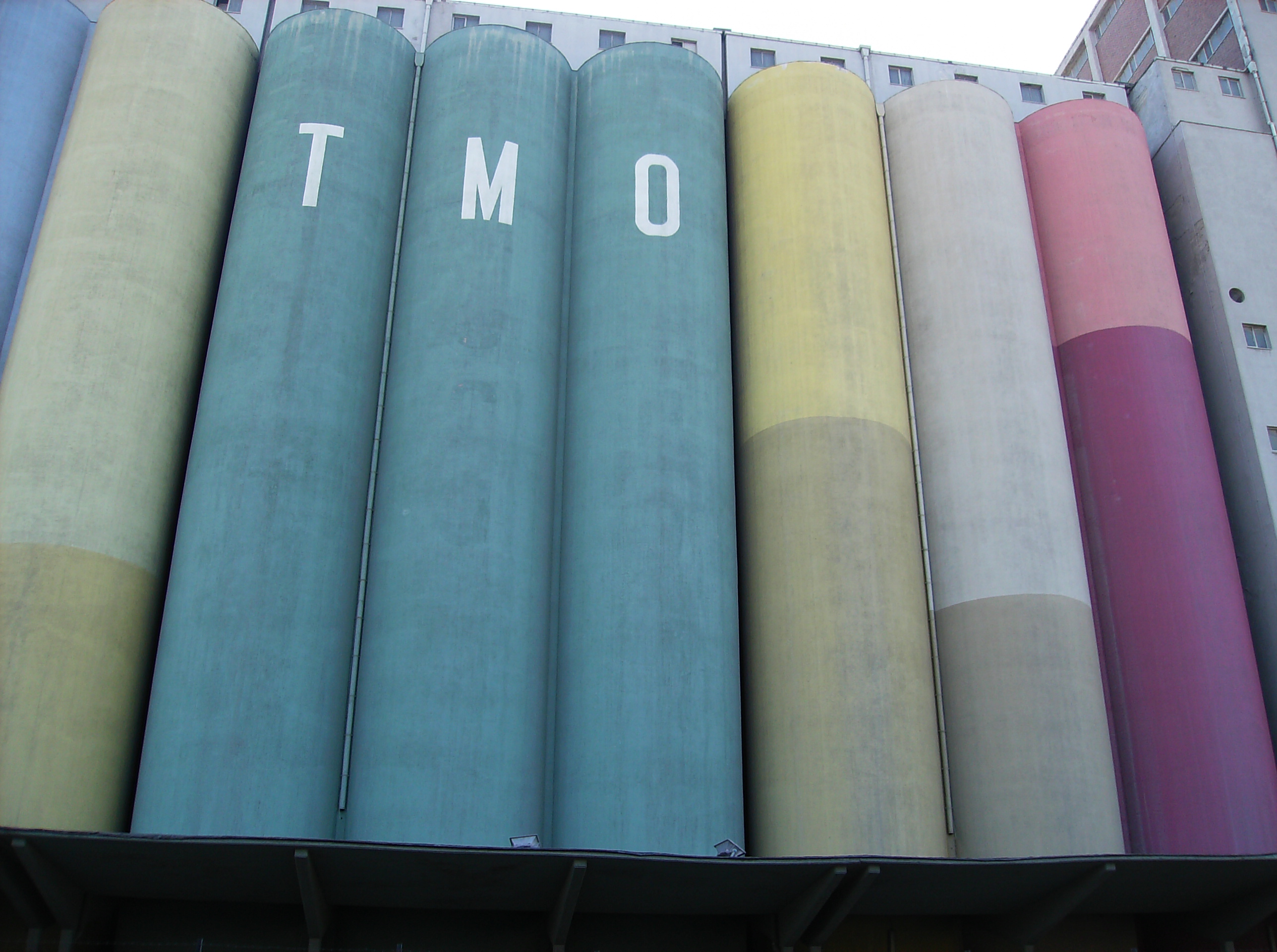
Turkish Grain Board silos in İzmir

In 2021 the country was almost self-sufficient in cereals, and the largest exports in 2022 were to Iraq, the United States and Syria. However, in hotter and colder years less cereal is produced. About 20 million tonnes a year of wheat are grown, but less than half that each of barley and corn. Most wheat is winter wheat. Wheat yields average 2 and a half tonnes a hectare, and climate change affects both wheat productivity and where it is grown. Barley is not usually irrigated, so yield depends on rainfall. Drought can be a problem for both winter wheat and winter barley. Nearly 85% of corn is used to make animal feed. Rice is planted April/May and harvested Sept/Oct.

=== Fruit, vegetables and legumes ===
Citrus fruits are grown mainly in the Mediterranean and Aegean regions. Many tomatoes are exported. Most vegetable and fruit exports are to the EU. Greenhouses have a competitive advantage over EU ones due to lower costs. In 2022 Turkey had a third of the world's greenhouses heated by geothermal energy. Geothermal heat can also be used to dry fruit. Tropical fruit such as mangoes can be grown in greenhouses. In 2023 hydroponics was starting to be used in these geothermal greenhouses. Although banana cultivation in the Mediterranean region is increasing, some farmers are switching to avocados as they are more profitable because they need less water.

About 4 million tonnes of grapes are grown annually, ranking sixth in the world. The country has the fifth largest area of vineyard, and about 3% of the harvest is used for Turkish wine. Raisins are exported to the EU and the United Kingdom.

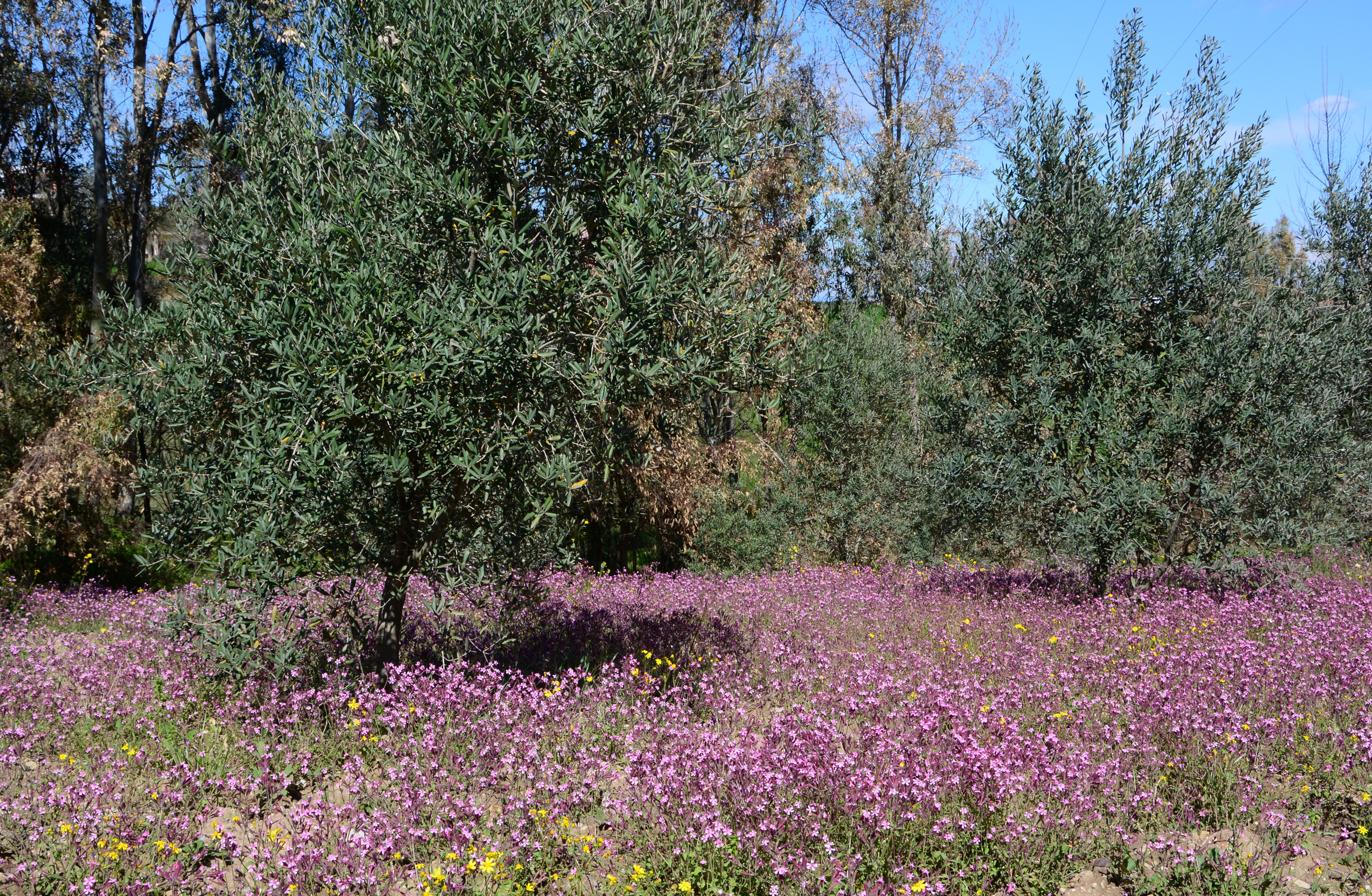
Olive trees in Sarıçam

There are almost 200 million olive trees, and Turkey produces about 200 thousand tonnes of olive oil a year, that is an average of 1 kg per tree per year. Edremit (Ayvalık) is the main variety in northern Turkey and Memecik in the south. Gemlik is a black table olive and many other varieties are grown.

Lentils are grown in the south-east.

=== Nuts and oilseeds ===
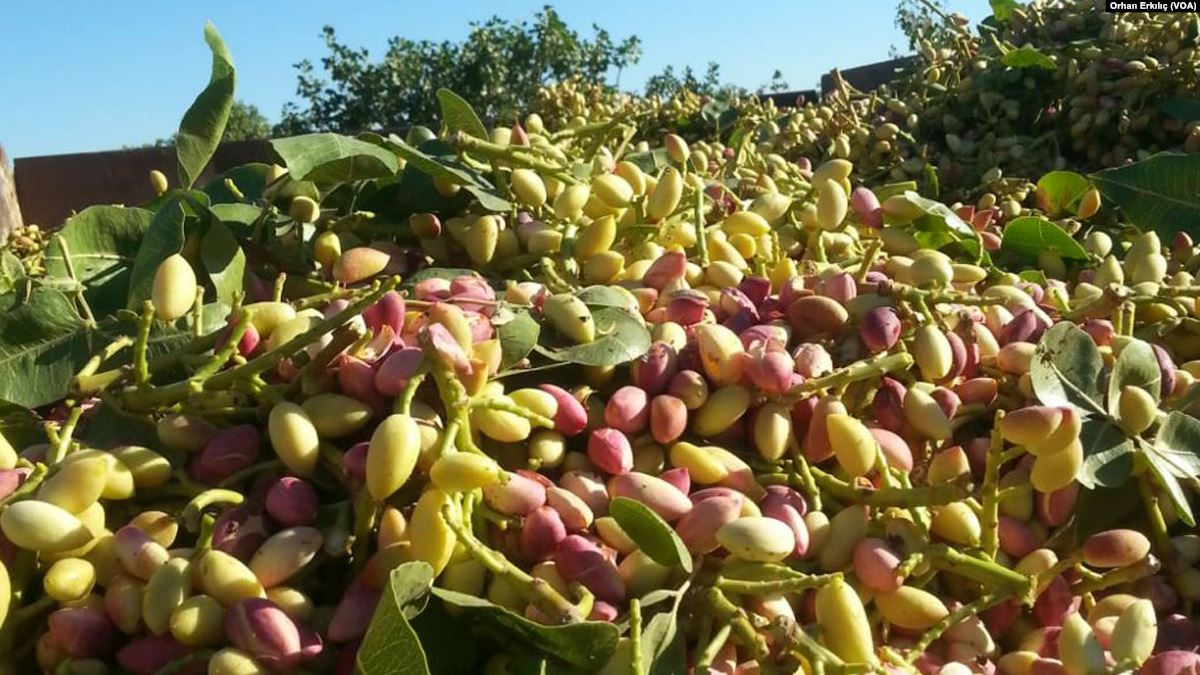
Pistachios in Gaziantep Province

==== Hazelnuts ====
Except for 1961 - 1968 and 1985, since 1968-1969 Turkey has produced the majority of the world's hazelnuts.

During 1999 Turkey produced 72.9 percent of the total world supply; approximately 60 percent of which from the Eastern Black Sea Region, 25 % from the Western Black Sea Region and 15 % from the Central Region.

In the period 2011-2018 Turkey was the world's largest producer of hazelnuts, accounting for 64% of world production. 2019-2020 Turkey produced 75% of world production. Turkiye was 63.5% of world production for 2021. 2022 about 70% of the world's hazelnuts were produced in Turkey. Ferrero, the Italian producer of Nutella spread, bought the most. During 2023 Turkey accounted for approximately 57.7% of world production.

==== Pistachios ====
Around 200 thousand tonnes of pistachios are produced annually but yields vary a lot between on and off years. The Turkish Foundation for Combating Soil Erosion has been training pistachio farmers.

==== Other nuts ====
The agriculture ministry is encouraging planting more almond and commercial walnut trees, as national supply does not meet domestic demand.

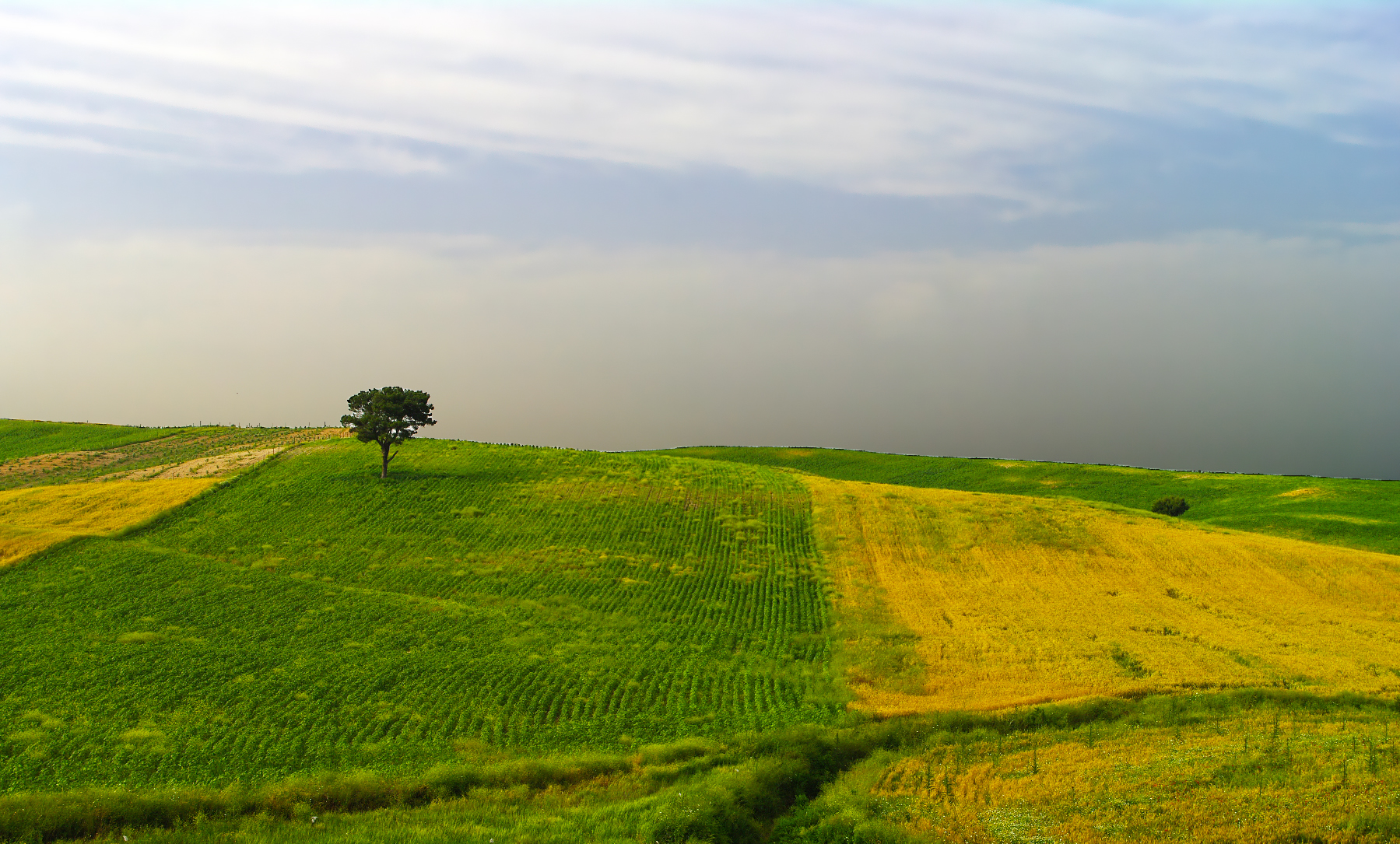
Sunflowers

==== Sunflower ====
Almost half of the country's sunflower seeds are grown in Thrace, and more sunflower oil is consumed than olive oil, as it is cheaper.

==== Soybean ====
Soybeans are used as a rotation crop and to feed fish and chickens.

=== Tea ===
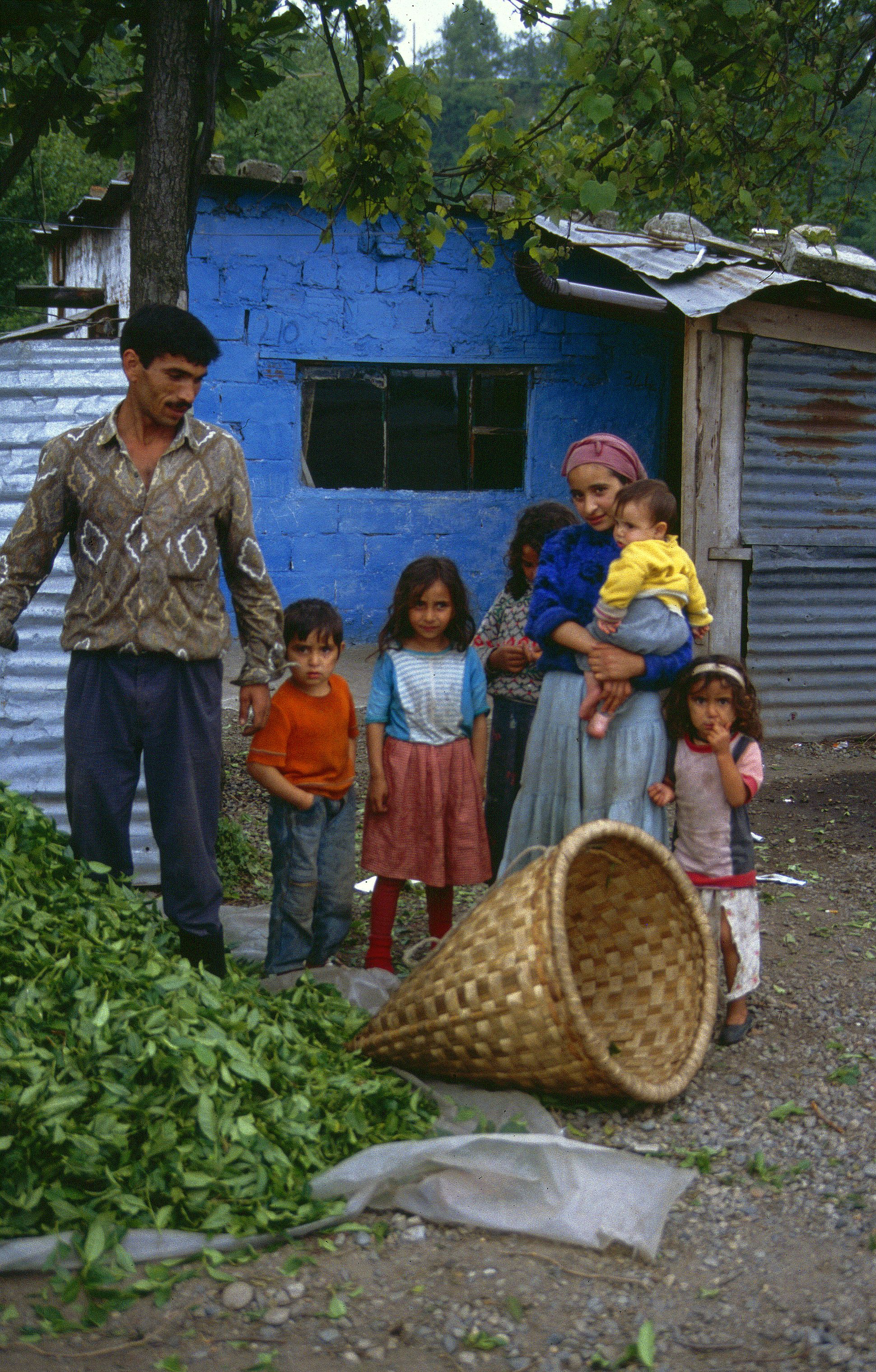
Black Sea tea farming in 1990

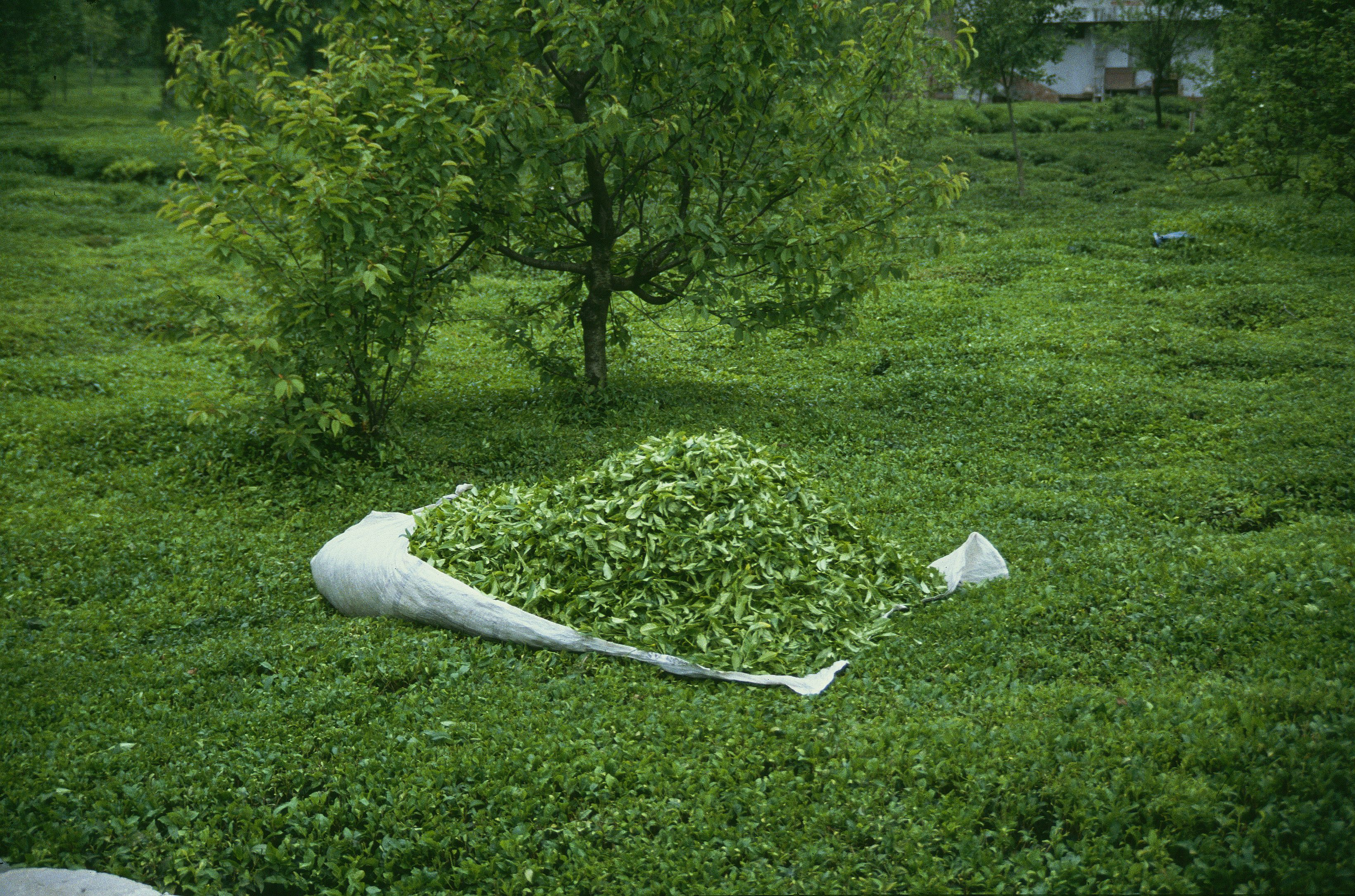
Tea harvest

Since the mid-20th century, most of the tea produced in Turkey has been Rize tea, a terroir from Rize Province on the Eastern Black Sea coast. Rize has a mild climate with high precipitation and fertile soil.

In 2019, Turkey produced 1.45 million tonnes of tea (4% of the world's tea), and was one of the largest tea markets in the world, with 1.26 million tonnes consumed in Turkey and the rest exported. Turks drink the most tea per person at 3.16 kg each a year, or almost four glasses a day. Turkey has high import tariffs on tea, roughly 145%, which help maintain the domestic market for locally produced teas.

However, by 2023, production had fallen to just over 500,000 tonnes due to high temperatures and irregular rainfall.

=== Herbs, medicines and spices ===
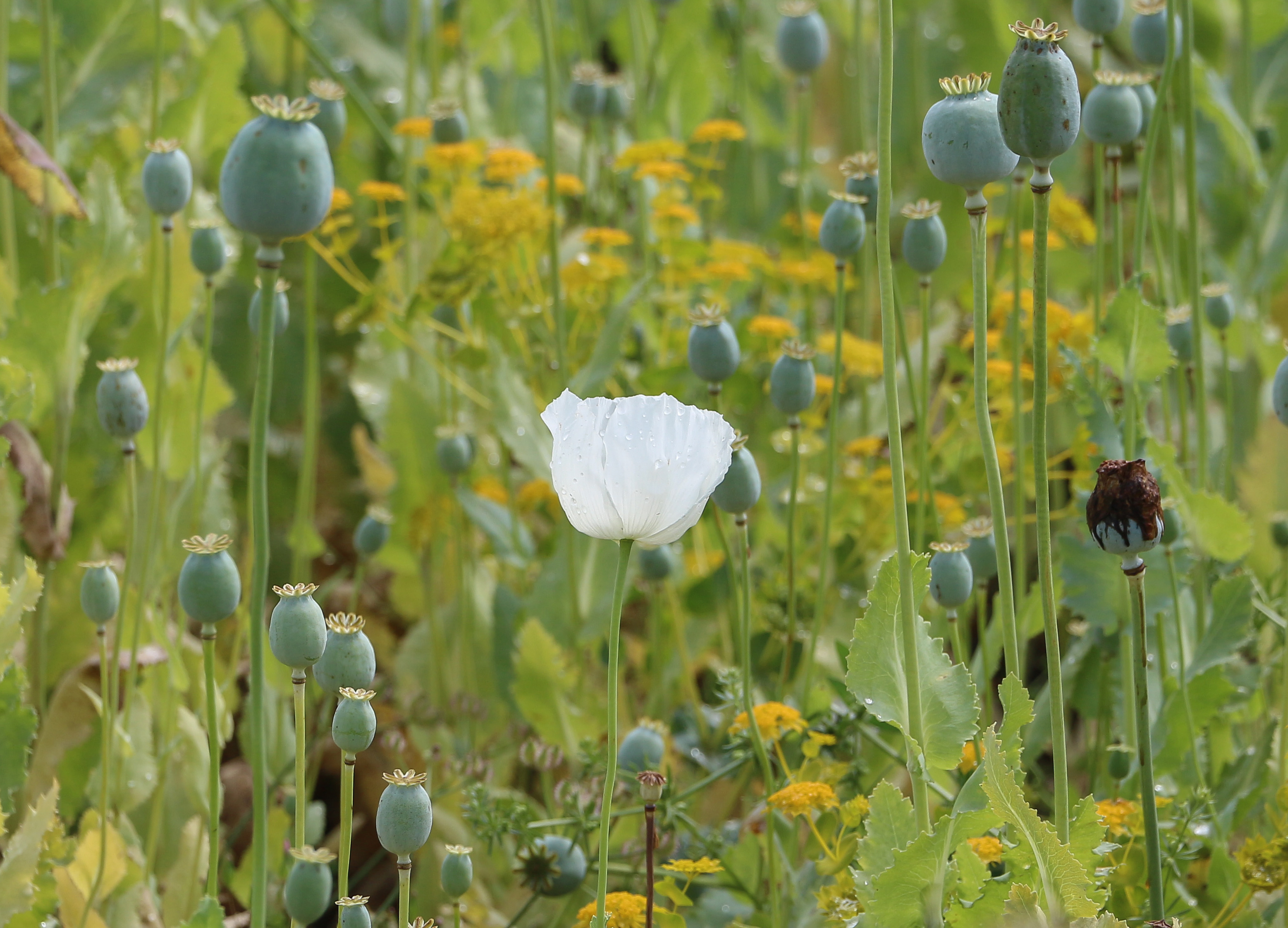
Opium poppies

There are about a thousand species of herbs, medicines and spices, of which almost half are exported, with oregano, bay leaves, sage, aniseed and cumin being the top export earners. Much aniseed is used in the country to flavour rakı. Turkey produces most of the world's oregano, and garlic is grown. Opium is grown for medicines.

== Livestock ==
There are about 150 thousand km^{2} of pasture. Much more meat is produced from cattle than sheep. A lot of sheep and goat meat is exported to Iraq. Over 20 million tonnes of milk is produced each year. The meat and milk board regulates the meat market.

The main animal feed crops are alfalfa, silage corn, oats, vetch, and sainfoin. Animal feed manufacture depends on imports and more cattle feed is produced than chicken feed. Livestock are affected by foot and mouth disease.

=== Cattle ===
In 2022 there were 17 million cattle of which about 70% were dairy. Native cattle breeds such as Anatolian Black cattle are low yielding but hardy. About 80% of cattle farm expenditure is on feed, with half of the ingredients being imported. Most imports are feeder cattle for beef. Around half of Turkey's agricultural greenhouse gas is due to cattle. Traditionally transhumance was practiced. The Agriculture Ministry is trying to get more biogas produced from cattle waste. Cattle are subsidized by the "Rural Prosperity, Livestock Support Project" until 2028.

=== Sheep, goats and buffalo ===
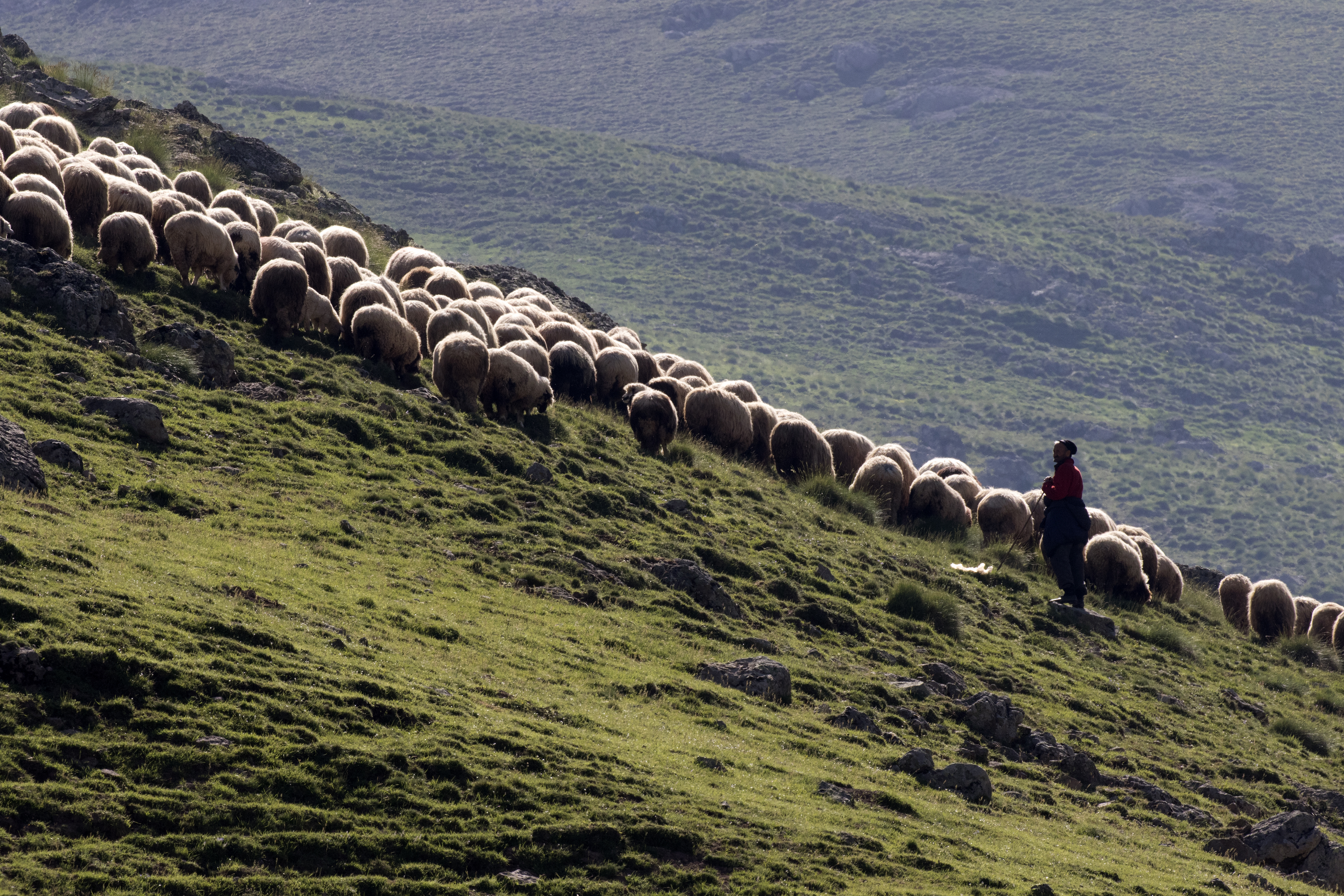
Sheep in Dereli

Turkey is a major sheep producer. In 2022 there were 45 million sheep, including 30 million ewes (mostly of the fat-tailed type) and the average flock size was 85. A quarter of meat is from sheep, with 390 thousand tonnes a year and an average 4.2 kilograms (9.3 lb) is consumed per person per year. The highest sheep meat consumption is during Eid Al Adha. Turkish sheep meat is exported to Iraq, Syria and Gulf countries. Cheese is made from sheep milk. Sheep and goats are mostly fed on pasture. In 2022 there were 12 million goats and 170 thousand water buffalos.

=== Aquaculture ===
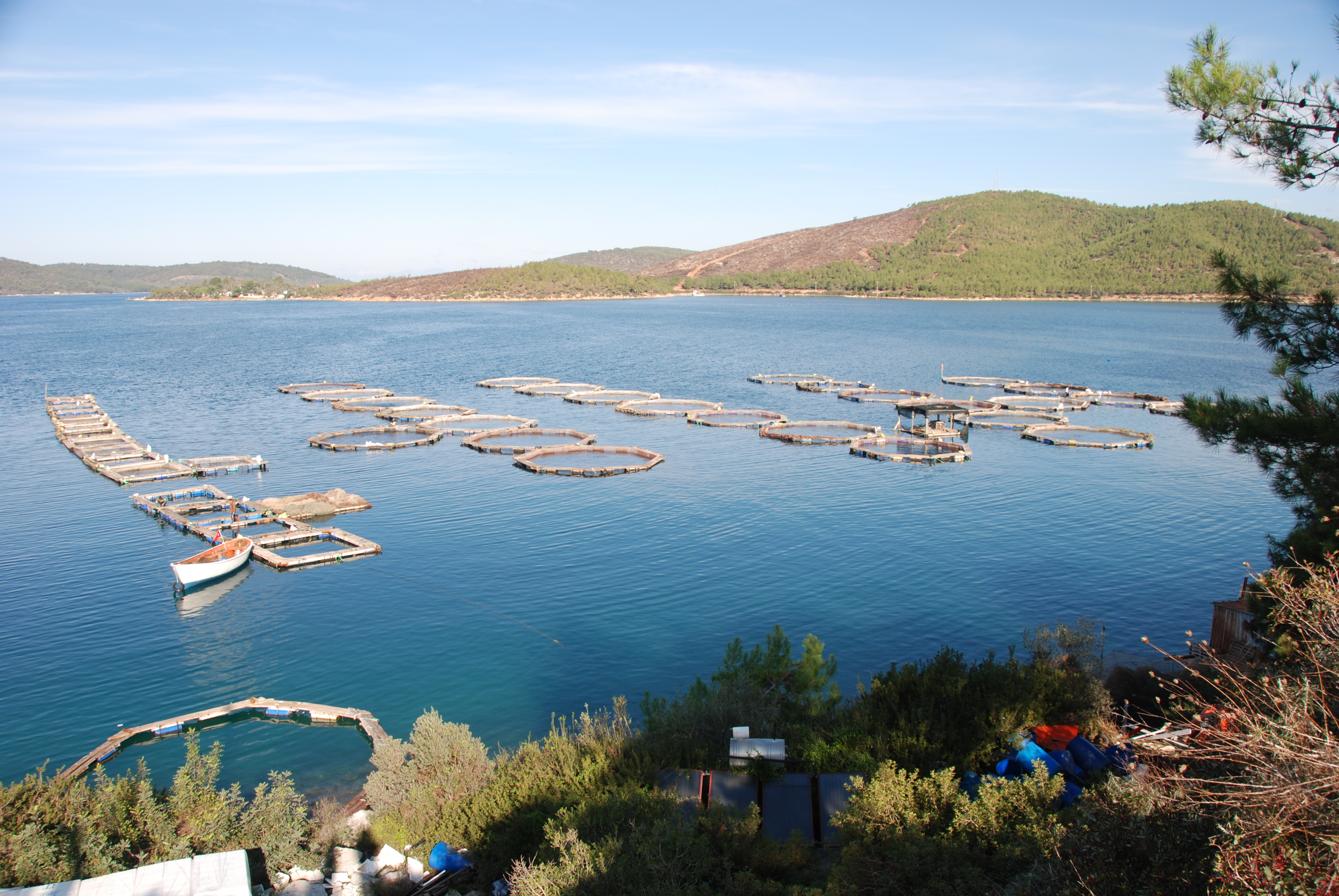
Fish farming in Aegean Turkey

There are over 400 marine aquaculture facilities. Sea bass (Dicentrarchus labrax) and sea bream (Sparus aurata) are farmed, and mostly trout (rainbow trout and brown trout) in inland waters, these 3 being the most farmed, with about 150 thousand tonnes a year of each. Aquaculture overtook fishing in 2020, with Muğla, İzmir and Elazığ being the top provinces.

Government support is provided, although subsidies for seabream and seabass ended in 2016. In 2021, US$1.2 billion worth of farmed fish were exported, and Turkey was the world's top producer of seabass and seabream. Most exports are to the EU and EU directives are followed.

=== Other livestock ===
Over a million tonnes of poultry meat and over 2 million tonnes of eggs are produced a year, and over a hundred thousand tonnes of honey.

== Policy, regulation and research ==
It is the responsibility of the Ministry of Agriculture and Forestry. Almost all the seeds used in Turkey are produced domestically. Seeds and bulbs are stored long term. The World Bank has a project to improve sustainable agriculture in some regions, however in the first 2 decades of the 21st century farming is thought not to have been sustainable. The EU said in 2022 that food safety, veterinary and phytosanitary policy should be improved.

Various tech is being considered, sometimes similar is already being made in local factories, for example the defence industry makes drones. There are about 2 million tractors and it has been suggested that electric tractors should be subsidized. However, there is only one electric tractor manufacturer and they are not yet mass-produced. There is a General Directorate of Agricultural Research and Policies (TAGEM) centre for research on soil borne pathogens.

As of 2022 some gene editing of animal feed corn and feed soya has been allowed but not for human food. Biostimulants have been suggested to increase drought resistance and food security, as has technology to use water more efficiently. No-till farming is being studied. A 2023 study said that enforcement of pesticide rules was lax.

Examples of good practice suggested by the Turkish Industry and Business Association (TÜSİAD) include reduced ploughing, low fertiliser use, mulching, and nitrogen inhibitors. Less ploughing saves fuel costs. The EU said that in 2024 "Türkiye took no significant steps to advance on sustainable agriculture under the Turkish Green Deal action plan.".

== Trade and economics ==
Agriculture is an important sector of Turkey's economy, and the country is one of the world's top ten agricultural producers. Over 50 billion dollars revenue a year is from agriculture, and farming provided 10% of exports in 2020 and 6.5% of GDP in 2022. Despite being a major food producer, Turkey is a net wheat importer, with much of it coming from Russia and Ukraine. Turkey is the EU's fourth largest non-EU vegetable supplier and the seventh largest fruit supplier. In 2023 Finance Minister Mehmet Şimşek said he would like to restart negotiations on the "low-hanging fruit" of extending the EU Customs Union Agreement to agricultural products, which had come to a halt in 2018; as of 2023 the agreement only applies to processed agricultural products. In 2021, Turkey received 65 percent of all imported wheat from Russia and more than 13 percent from Ukraine. Around 70% of imported wheat is reexported as pasta, bulgur and flour. Europe and the Middle East are large export markets and some food is processed before export. In 2020 the country receiving the most exports was Iraq, and that sending the most food to Turkey was Russia. Turkey is the world's largest exporter of wheat flour, and some other countries' flour producers say it is dumping with unfair subsidies. The EU intends to support rural development with €430 million during 2021–2027. Total factor productivity is estimated to have decreased by 2% annually on average from 2005 to 2016. According to the International Fund for Agricultural Development "investment is needed to help farmers update production techniques, boost productivity and cope with climate change" in the uplands (most rural land is uplands). In 2023 food inflation was over 50%. In 2023 the EU complained that Turkey was restricting imports and said it should improve food safety, veterinary and phytosanitary policy.

Although in April 2023 there were no import taxes on wheat, barley, maize, rye, oats, legumes and sorghum; as of May 2023 there is a 130% import tariff on wheat, rye, oats, barley and corn. The TMO price of wheat was about 30% below the market price in 2023. Gübretaş and Hektaş are large producers of fertiliser and other farm products. State enterprises market some products. The largest sugar company is the state-owned Türkşeker. Over a billion dollars of damage to agriculture infrastructure and storage was done by the 2023 earthquake. The Agricultural Insurance Pool^{(Turkish)} is linked to the government. But import tariffs average over 40% so it would be hard to add agriculture to the EU customs union. Some academics say that high food price inflation is due to macroeconomic instability. Food price rises such as onion and potato prices can be politically sensitive. TÜSİAD say that Turkey needs a good climate change adaptation strategy to cope with effects such as drought. Input costs could be reduced by replacing some diesel use with solar power, but as of 2022 agrivoltaics is only allowed on agriculturally marginal land. and farmers say there is too much red tape. Problems include small farm sizes, rising import costs and natural resource depletion such as soil. Nearly two-thirds of farms are smaller than 5 hectares, possibly due to divisions on inheritance.

=== Employment ===
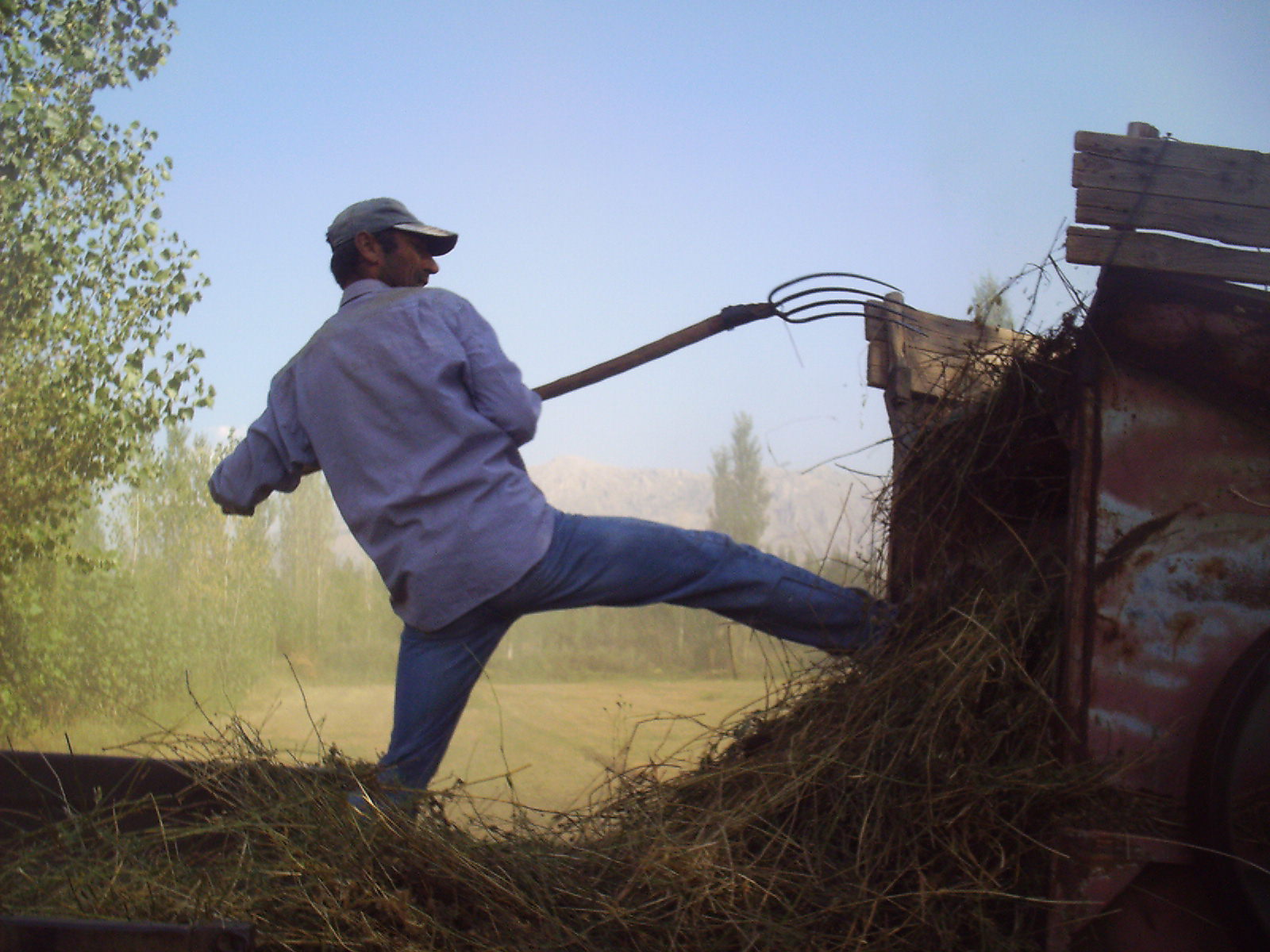
Farmer in Hacımirza

There are just under half a million farmers as of 2022, 16% of the workforce. As of 2022, agricultural statistics need improvement according to the EU. In 2022 there were over 2 million people on the Agriculture Ministry's Farmer Registration System, but only half a million were farmers and known to the Social Security Institution. Many farms are small, mostly single person or family farms, with many women working informally. It has been claimed that with the influx of Syrian refugees seasonal agricultural work became more precarious, especially for women and children. Kurdish seasonal workers are also poor. The International Labour Organization is helping to stop child labour. The UN Food and Agriculture Organization has various projects, prioritising "Food and Nutrition Security and Food Safety", "Sustainable use of natural resources and raising awareness on climate change impacts" and "Institutional Capacity of Public and Private Sectors".

=== Quotas and subsidies ===
The 2024 agricultural support budget was €2.7 billion. In 2019–21 about 20% of gross farm income was government support, mostly market price support, particularly for potatoes, wheat, sunflower seed and beef. Diesel and fertilizer payments were made, which may make the goal of net zero greenhouse gas emissions by 2053 more difficult. According to environmental group Doğa the subsidies for water intensive crops such as corn and sugar beet endanger wetlands in Turkey.

Farmers are not allowed to export wheat. Despite subsidies farmers' fuel and fertilizer costs increased a lot in 21/22 due to international price rises and the fall in the lira. The state's Grain Board (TMO)^{(Turkish)} sometimes pays more for foreign than Turkish wheat, and farmers complain that foreign wheat is sold at a discount: this is done so bread is cheaper, as Turks eat so much bread. A TMO objective is to stabilize grain prices. Cotton growing and oilseeds are subsidized. There is some support for organic farming. Some farmers say their debt is due to not enough state support.

Although a healthy amount of sugar is less than 50g a day for an adult the sugar production quota for market year 26/27 was 3 million tonnes, thus for the population of under 90 million about twice as much sugar is produced than is healthy. On average Turks consume 35 kilograms a year, mostly as confectionery.
