= Orhan Kuntay =

Turkish architect and professor (1939–2018)

- Born: 28 May 1939; Tokat, Turkey
- Died: 16 April 2018 (aged 78); Ankara, Turkey
- Occupations: Professor and architect

Orhan Kuntay (28 May 1939 – 16 April 2018) was a Turkish architect and professor of City and Regional Planning specializing in urban sustainability and tourism. He was the led the development of the master plan for the Eastern Anatolia Project (DAP), which encompasses 14 cities and has begun implementation in 2011. Kuntay was the architect of several prominent buildings in Turkey, notably the Queen Sunrise Hotel and the Mosque of Kumbet. He served as a department chairman at the Gazi University and was the author of several published books.

== Early life and education ==
Orhan Kuntay was born as the son of Mustafa and Fatma Kuntay in the Northeastern city of Tokat, in 1939. His grandfather, Hacı Ömer Mustafa Kuntay, was the Mufti of Tokat Province of the Ottoman Empire during the WWI.

Kuntay received his bachelor's degree in Architecture from Istanbul Technical University (ITU) in 1963. He continued his education at University of Paris (Sorbonne), earning a Ph.D. in 1969, shortly before the university changed its name in 1970.

== Career ==
After completing his 24-month mandatory military service, Kuntay practiced architecture until starting postgraduate studies. During this time, he designed the Mosque of Kümbet in Tokat, which was completed in 1966. The mosque has a futuristic design.

Upon receiving the Ph.D. from University of Paris, Kuntay returned to Turkey and began working at the Karadeniz Technical University. Following the 1980 Turkish coup d'état until 1989, he worked in Algiers as consultant for the Algerian Ministry of Tourism.

Kuntay returned to Turkey in 1989 and worked in an architectural office, during which he designed the Queen Sunrise Luxury Resort, a 1000-bed luxury hotel in Antalya, along with two other large hotels.

Starting from 1993, Kuntay served as the chair of the City and Regional Planning department of Gazi University. He often led major conferences on City Planning throughout Turkey. As a juror for Antalya Environmental Protection Agency he helped preserve several national parks, most notably Köprülü Canyon in 1994.

Kuntay was the General Manager of the master plan for the Eastern Anatolia Project (DAP), which, following the former Southeastern Anatolia Project, aims at developing the Eastern region of Turkey in many aspects. The project has been ongoing for over 20 years and it is seen as pivotal for the sustainability of the region.

In 2008 he designed a second mosque for Tokat GOP University. This mosque has unique features such as calligraphic roundels similar to those in Hagia Sophia and glass walls that lead to the perception that the dome is hovering over the ground.

Kuntay was the author of the books Pedestrian Zones, Sustainable Parking Design, and Sustainable Turism Planning. He also has written several articles in the Cumhuriyet newspaper

== Death ==
Orhan Kuntay died in Ankara on 16 April 2018, at the age of 78.
