= Arrest of Ekrem İmamoğlu =

2025 arrest of the mayor of Istanbul

Detention and arrest of Ekrem İmamoğlu
- Part of democratic backsliding in Turkey
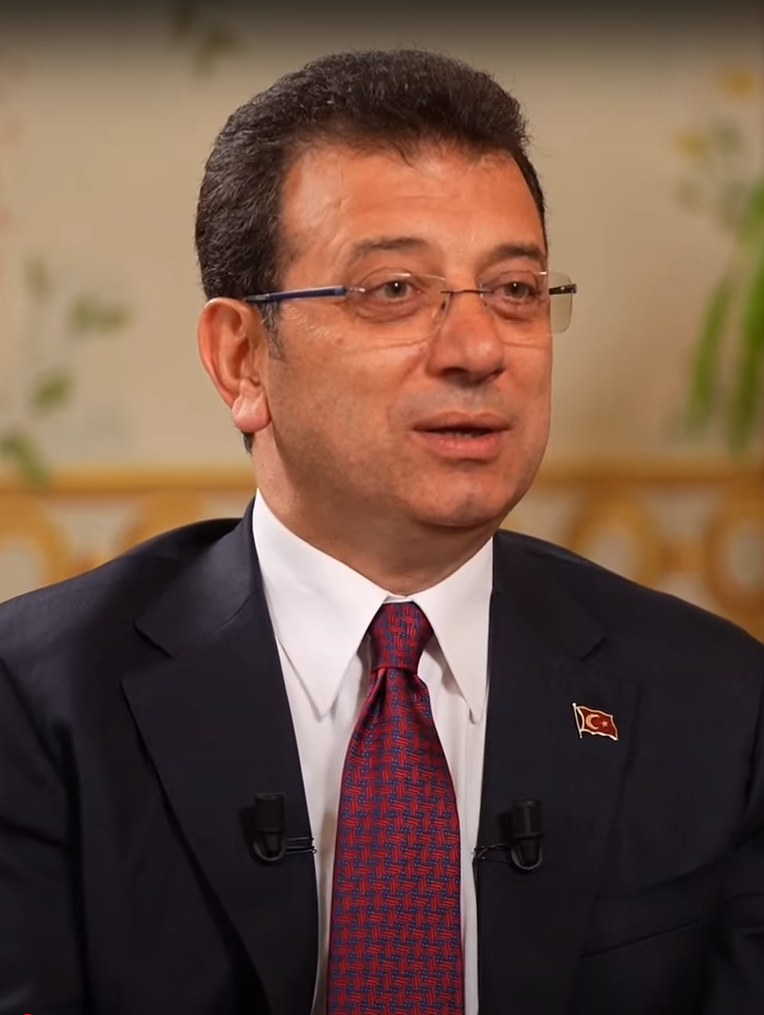
- İmamoğlu in March 2024
- Date: 19 March 2025
- Location: Istanbul, Turkey
- Cause: Alleged corruption and terrorism
- Participants: Turkish police
- Outcome: 2025 Turkish protests; Turkish lira sliding to its lowest and economic crisis intensified, causing some investors to pull out; Restriction of social media platforms; The Radio and Television Supreme Council fined some broadcasters for their coverage of İmamoğlu; Ekrem İmamoğlu was arrested and sent to Marmara Prison on 23 March 2025.
- Arrests: Ekrem İmamoğlu

On 19 March 2025, Istanbul mayor and presidential candidate Ekrem İmamoğlu from the opposition Republican People's Party was detained by Turkish police on suspicion of corruption, extortion, bribery, money laundering, espionage, and supporting terrorism, particularly the PKK.

İmamoğlu was later arrested and sent to Marmara Prison on corruption charges on 23 March 2025 just as he was becoming a serious challenger to President Recep Tayyip Erdogan. In the 2025 Republican People's Party presidential primary later that day over 15 million people voted in İmamoğlu's support. His arrest, along with that of more than 100 other people, caused widespread protests and demonstrations over perceived political motivations.

The Council of Europe, European Parliament and Human Rights Watch strongly condemned the detention of İmamoğlu, describing it as against the will of the people. After the detention, anti-government protests began in Turkey.

== Background ==
Many opposition mayors have been arrested and removed from office, including the current president in 1999 and Kurdish party mayors in the south-east. European Judges for Democracy and Liberty say that the justice system is not independent and that there are “many examples of arbitrary justice and of unlawful detention in Turkey”. During the first couple of months of 2025 some activists, journalists and opposition mayor, were detained. Including the trial in 2022, there have been several investigations and trials of Ekrem İmamoğlu some of which are ongoing.

=== Annulment of university degree ===
On 18 March 2025, Istanbul University annulled İmamoğlu's degree, citing irregularities. As Turkey's presidential candidates must hold a university degree, this would effectively block him from running for president. The decision came days before the opposition party was set to nominate him.

Just before İmamoğlu was formally elected as the Mayor of Istanbul in 2019, Sabah newspaper alleged that İmamoğlu’s transfer from Girne American University in Northern Cyprus to Istanbul University was illegal. In response to a complaint in 2020 Istanbul University Presidency said that İmamoğlu applied for the international transfer quota announced by the university and that his application was evaluated and accepted according to the regulations. However, in 2024 the Higher Education Council said that in 1990, the year İmamoğlu transferred, it did not recognize Girne American University. İmamoğlu's lawyers say that at that time recognition of the sending university was not required for transfer, so Istanbul University accepted him. Legal action attempting reinstatement of his degree continues.

== Detention and arrest ==
On the morning of 19 March 2025, Turkish police surrounded İmamoğlu's residence in Istanbul. In a video, tweeted at approximately 7 a.m. local time, İmamoğlu said "We are facing great oppression, but I will not give up. I entrust myself to my nation." Shortly thereafter, İmamoğlu and around 100 other people, including his advisor Murat Ongun, were detained.

Two Istanbul district mayors from the CHP, and several journalists and business figures, were detained as part of the same operation. These developments came on the morning of İmamoğlu becoming the CHP presidential candidate. The CHP condemned the detentions, describing them as a "coup attempt", and expressed their support for İmamoğlu. On March 23 twenty people, including the Chairman of the Board of Directors of Media Inc. and İmamoğlu's advisor Murat Ongun, Istanbul Planning Agency President Buğra Gökçe, İmamoğlu Construction General Manager Tuncay Yılmaz and İBB Kültür A.Ş. General Manager Murat Abbas, were arrested. Forty-eight people, including İmamoğlu, were arrested in the corruption investigation, three people were arrested in the terrorism investigation, and judicial control decisions were issued for forty-one people. On that day, İmamoğlu was the only candidate in the CHP's presidential primary election, held to choose the party's nominee for the upcoming presidential election. According to CHP Chairman Özgür Özel, İmamoğlu received over 14.85 million votes.

The Istanbul Chief Public Prosecutor's Office accused İmamoğlu of being the "leader of a criminal organization," alleging corruption, extortion, bribery, and money laundering tied to municipal contracts. Prosecutors also charged him with aiding the Kurdistan Workers' Party (PKK), by forming an electoral alliance with the pro-Kurdish Peoples' Equality and Democracy Party (DEM) during the 2024 municipal elections. The government claimed this "city consensus" increased the PKK's influence in urban areas. İmamoğlu and his supporters rejected the charges as fabricated, asserting they were designed to eliminate him as a political threat to President Recep Tayyip Erdoğan. The Istanbul Chief Public Prosecutor's Office also announced that İmamoğlu's construction company had been seized as part of the investigation and detained its general manager.

The Turkish government also imposed a four-day ban on public demonstrations in Istanbul, closed major roads, and restricted access to social media platforms such as Twitter, YouTube, and Instagram, according to internet watchdog NetBlocks. İmamoğlu was taken to the Vatan Security Department in Istanbul, where he remained in custody pending further legal proceedings.

== Aftermath ==
=== Censorship ===
Four TV stations were fined by the Radio and Television Supreme Council because of their broadcasts about İmamoğlu.

The Turkish government has increased censorship by cooperating with social media companies such as Google, Meta Platforms, TikTok, Twitter and Bluesky to block accounts and posts.

On October 14, 2026 Halk TV, which served as an important source of information of his case to the public, was raided and its administrators replaced by the government on the same day as İmamoğlu was to begin his defence in the court.

=== Economic impact ===
The arrest of Ekrem İmamoğlu led to significant fluctuations in the Turkish economy, because it increased political uncertainty. The central bank sold nearly $10 billion in foreign currency, so the Turkish lira fell only 3% against the US dollar. The BIST 100 index fell by almost 9%. Turkey's 2045-maturity dollar-denominated government bond lost 1.6 cents in value, dropping to 80.9 cents.

Revising its expectation of a 250-basis-point monthly cut by the Central Bank, JPMorgan predicted that the central bank would cut interest rates by 150 basis points at each meeting. Bank of America raised its inflation forecast to 28% and year end interest rate projection to 32.5%.

Turkey's Minister of Treasury and Finance, Mehmet Şimşek, stated, "Everything necessary is being done to ensure the healthy functioning of the markets. The economic program we are implementing continues resolutely." Foreign investors’ confidence fell, and some experts say that the full economic impact will only become clear over the course of the year.

On 17 April 2025, Germany blocked the sale of 40 Eurofighter Typhoons to Turkey after the arrest of İmamoğlu, citing political tensions.

=== Mass arrests and detentions ===
Since he was arrested, more than 2,000 people have been detained, including dozens journalists.

- Mehmet Murat Çalık - Mayor of Beylikdüzü (Istanbul) - Arrested on 2025-03-23
- Resul Emrah Şahan - Mayor of Şişli (Istanbul) - Arrested on 2025-03-23.
- Cevat Kaya - İmamoğlu's wife's brother - Arrested after his detainment on 2025-04-26.
- Utku Caner Çaykara - Mayor of Avcılar (Istanbul) - Arrested
- Hasan Akgün - Mayor of Büyükçekmece (Istanbul) - Arrested
  - Ahmet Şahin - Vice President - Arrested on 2025-07-08 along with his driver.
- Mehmet Pehlivan - İmamoğlu's lawyer - Detained twice then arrested on 2025-06-19
- Hakan Bahçetepe - Mayor of Gaziosmanpaşa (Istanbul) - Arrested for bribery.
- Kadir Aydar - Mayor of Ceyhan (Adana) - Arrested
- Oya Tekin - Mayor of Seyhan (Adana) - Arrested
- Niyazi Nefi Kara - Mayor of Manavgat (Antalya) - Arrested on 2025-07-08
- Abdurrahman Tutdere - Mayor of Adıyaman - Home arrest
- Zeydan Karalar - Mayor of Adana - Arrested on 2025-07-08
- Hüseyin Kocabıyık - Expelled AKP member arrested for insulting Erdoğan on 2025-10-07.

=== Seizure of companies ===
- İmamoğlu İnşaat, a construction company owned by İmamoğlu seized on 2025-04-26.
- Can Holding were owner of major television channels such as Haberturk, Show TV and Bloomberg HT seized on 2025-09-11

== Reactions ==
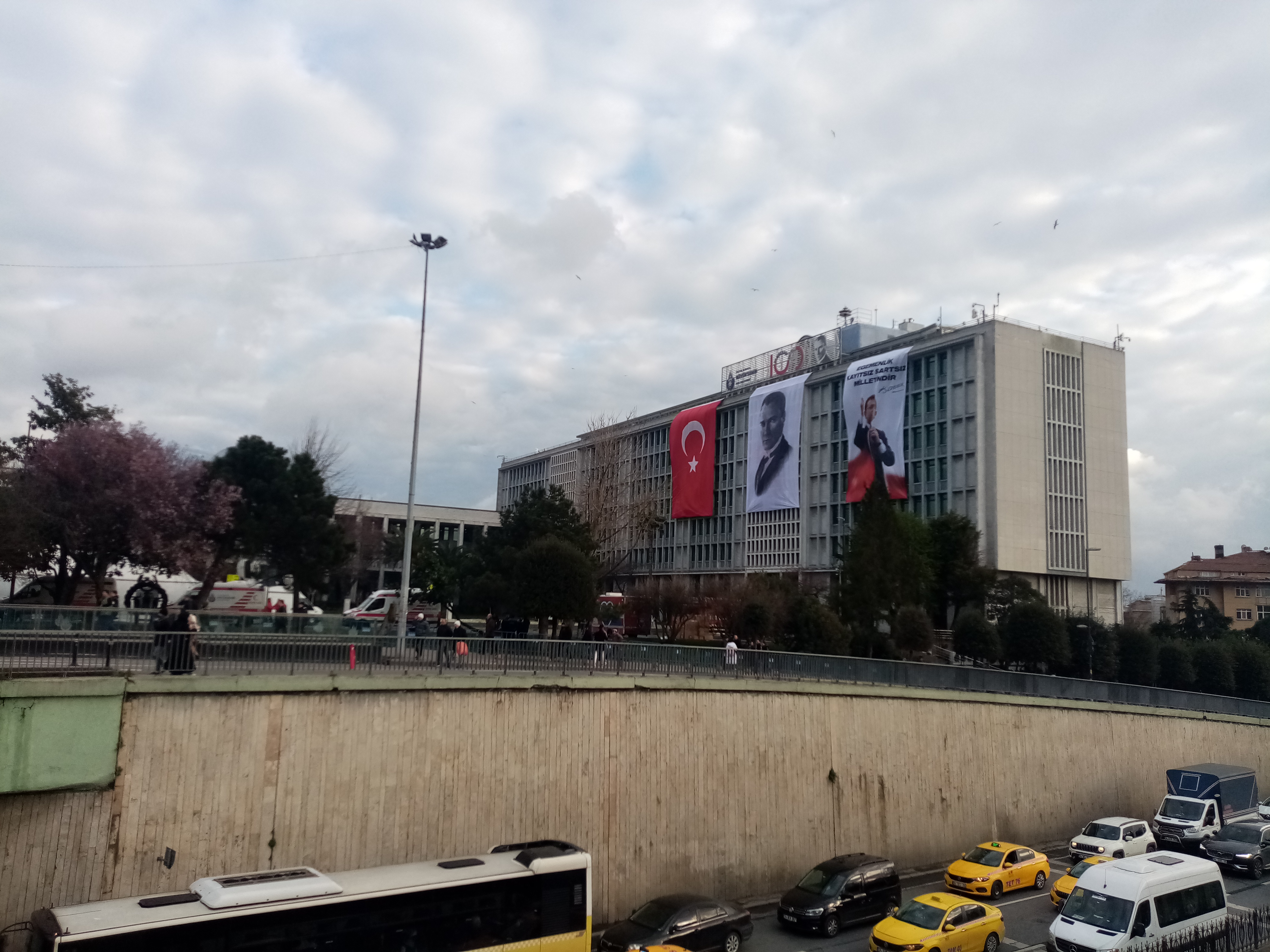
The poster of Ekrem İmamoğlu was placed over IBB's building in Saraçhane, March 20, 2025.

=== Domestic ===
- CHP Chairman Özgür Özel described İmamoğlu's arrest as a "coup" and referred to İmamoğlu as "[...] our next president."
- Ankara Metropolitan Mayor Mansur Yavaş (CHP) stated, "Such actions against an elected mayor are absolutely unacceptable." He had previously declared, "If İmamoğlu's candidacy is suspended, I will suspend mine as well."
- DEM Party Co-Chairman Tuncer Bakırhan criticized the arrest, "The government is dragging the country into increasing violent upheaval with its silencing of the opposition". Deputy leader Ebru Gunay stated that "What happened in Istanbul showed once again that this country needs a real democracy" while arguing that "The threat of (using government-appointed officials as) trustees, repression and arrests is imposed on Kurds, and now it's happening to Turkey's opposition. There is no guarantee that it won't happen to others tomorrow".
- Future Party Chairman and former Prime Minister Ahmet Davutoğlu criticized the situation, stating, "It is the greatest disgrace and scandal for Turkey that diploma wars are being fought to reach the highest office of the state, the Presidency."
- İYİ Party Chairman Müsavat Dervişoğlu opposed the arrest, arguing that the opposition should boycott the elections. He also called the situation a "civilian coup".
- New Welfare Party Chairman Fatih Erbakan stated, "Tampering with Turkey's foundations, shaking the justice system—the basis of the state—and undermining the economy's need for stability and trust benefits no one."
- İmamoğlu’s wife Dilek said: “Ekrem’s arrest and suspension from office were aimed at intimidating him and the public. Instead, they have galvanised people across Turkey.”

=== International ===
- The Congress of Local and Regional Authorities of the Council of Europe expressed deep concern over the extensive use of pre-trial detention in cases involving opposition mayors, warning that disproportionate detentions undermine the presumption of innocence and risk stifling political pluralism and democratic debate; the Congress’s initial request to the Venice Commission was submitted in connection with the March 2025 arrest of Ekrem İmamoğlu.
- The Council of Europe strongly condemned İmamoğlu's arrest as "an action against the will of the people." The council announced that the issue would be discussed at the Congress of Local and Regional Authorities meeting on 24 March.
- Human Rights Watch Turkey Director Emma Sinclair-Webb condemned the arrest, stating that they were part of a "series of politically motivated investigations aimed at obstructing opposition activities."
- Erion Veliaj, the Mayor of Tirana who was reinstated by Albania's Constitutional Court after being held in prolonged pre-trial detention, published a letter of support from his counterpart in Istanbul. The letter, from Mayor Ekrem İmamoğlu who is also detained in Turkey under contentious charges, framed their situations as a shared, transnational struggle for democratic integrity and the rule of law.

=== Analysts ===
- Political scientist Umut Özkırımlı described İmamoğlu's arrest as part of an "executive coup" by Erdoğan. He argued that the arrest demonstrated that Turkey had become a "full-blown autocracy" rather than a "hybrid regime", and wrote that "the old Turkey is gone".

== See also ==
- List of arrested journalists in Turkey
- Human rights in Turkey
