= Mukhtar =

Village chief title or family headmen in the Levant

The mukhtar (Arabic: مختار, romanized: mukhtār, lit. 'chosen one'; Turkish: muhtar; Greek: μουχτάρης) was a civilian administrator, a type of lesser mayor, in villages and neighbourhoods in the Ottoman Empire. The office was retained in the local administration of the Republic of Turkey as a village or neighbourhood mayor. It also exists in modern Lebanon as an elected local official, and in the Gaza as an honorific for clan elders.

== Ottoman Empire ==
The Vilayet Law (1864) saw a general reorganization, with the hierarchy vilayet—sanjak—kaza—nahiye, the vilayet administrated by the Vali under whose authority was the mutasarrif of the sanjak appointed by the Sultan, the kaymakam of the kaza appointed by the Interior Ministry, the mudür of the nahiye, the muhtar of the village.

In 1914 the muhtar, as a civilian administrator of a village or neighbourhood (mahala), mobilized people to World War I, as per new conscription regulations. This made the muhtar representing state authority at the lowest level. Recruitment offices conducted procedures at district level while the muhtar gathered the men and provided demographic data.

== Contemporary usage ==
=== Turkey ===
A muhtar is the elected village head in villages of Turkey and in villages of the Turkish occupied part of the Republic of Cyprus. In cities, likewise, each neighbourhood has a muhtar but with a slightly different status. Muhtars and their village councils (Turkish: Azalar or İhtiyar heyeti) are elected during local elections for five years. However, political parties are not permitted to nominate candidates for these posts.

In each village, the muhtar is the highest elected authority of the village as there is no mayor in a village. According to the Village Law, tasks of the muhtars are in two groups: compulsory tasks are about public health, primary school education, security and notification of public announcements, etc. Noncompulsory tasks depend on the demands of village residents.

In each town there are several neighbourhoods. In medium-sized cities, there may be tens of neighbourhoods, and in big cities the number may exceed well over a hundred. Each has a muhtar. Urban muhtars have fewer tasks than rural muhtars, ranging from registering the residents of the quarter, to providing official copies of birth certificates and identification cards.

=== Lebanon ===
In modern Lebanon, the mukhtar or mukhtara (Arabic: مختارة, romanized: mukhtāra, for a woman) is an elected local official who represents a village or urban neighborhood. Serving six-year terms, mukhtars act as intermediaries between residents and the central administration. Although they exercise certain public functions, they are not civil servants and typically receive no formal salary. Candidates must meet basic eligibility criteria, including a minimum age requirement and literacy.

Mukhtars are primarily responsible for administrative and civil duties at the local level, such as issuing and certifying documents (birth, marriage, death, and residence certificates), maintaining electoral rolls, and facilitating interactions with government authorities. They may also play a social role within their communities, mediating disputes and assisting residents with bureaucratic procedures, particularly in areas where municipal services are limited or absent.

=== Palestine ===
In Palestine, the mukhtar is a village chief, based on "an old institution that goes back to the time of the Ottoman rule". According to Amir S. Cheshin, Bill Hutman and Avi Melamed, the mukhtar "for centuries were the central figures". They "were not restricted to Muslim communities"; even "Christian and Jewish communities in the Arab world also had mukhtars." Mukhtars are headmen or clan elders. They traditionally linked villagers with the state bureaucracy. Some of the mukhtar’s duties included registering life events (births, marriages, etc.) and notarizing documents. Quoting Tore Bjørgo: "The mukhtar was, among other things, responsible for collecting taxes and ensuring that law and order was prevailing in his village".

British rulers in Palestine before Israel's establishment in 1948 depended on mukhtars to rule. In Gaza, there are still dozens of families that function as powerful clans. These families derive their influence from overseeing businesses and have the allegiance of hundreds to thousands of relatives. The leader of each family is known as a mukhtar.

== See also ==
- Ayan (class)
- Kodjabashi
- Obor-knez

== Sources ==
- Beşikçi, M. (2012). The Ottoman Mobilization of Manpower in the First World War: Between Voluntarism and Resistance. Ottoman Empire and its heritage : politics, society and economy. Brill. ISBN 978-90-04-22520-6.
