= Gübretaş =

Fertilizer company in Turkey

- Founded: 1952
- Revenue: US$1.31 billion (2023)
- Operating income: US$106 million (2023)
- Total assets: US$1.18 billion (2023)
- Total equity: US$616.19 million (2023)

Gübretaş is a Turkish fertiliser manufacturer founded in 1952, which has over 30% of the market to agriculture in Turkey. It sells products such as humic acid. It is now mostly an agricultural co-operative but a quarter of its shares are now on the Turkish stock market, and it is a BIST 30 company. It is at risk from the EU Carbon Border Adjustment Mechanism. Land confiscated from İpek Holding after the failed 2016 coup, containing gold reserves, was sold to Gübretaş. In 2023 the mining facility was opened by President Erdoğan, and the company said that it aims to mine 2.5 tonnes a year in two and a half years time. Gübretaş Mining is the subsidiary that will do so - and in 2023 a team of their miners supported rescuers after the 2023 Turkey–Syria earthquake.
