= Murat Ongun =

Turkish journalist

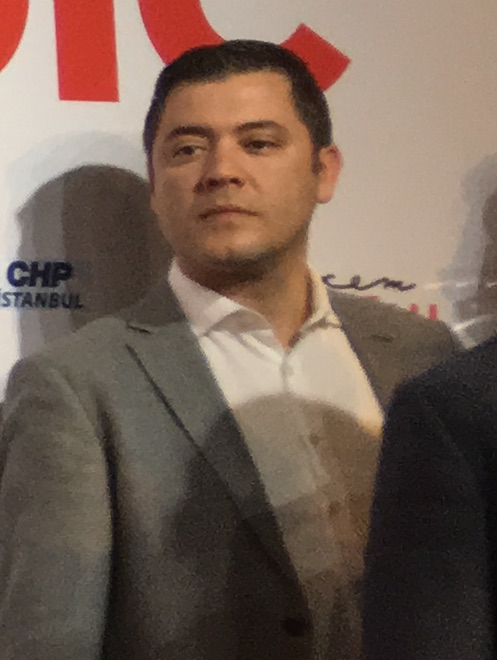

Istanbul Metropolitan Municipality
- Spokesperson
- In office June 2019 – 17 May 2022
- Preceded by: Position established
- Succeeded by: Position established

Personal details
- Born: 21 April 1975 (age 51) Ankara Turkey
- Party: Republican People's Party (? - present)
- Spouse: Gözdem Ongun
- Children: 2
- Education: Ankara University
- Occupation: politician; journalist; correspondent

Murat Ongun (born 21 April 1975) is a Turkish journalist and former spokesperson of the Istanbul Metropolitan Municipality. Currently, he was being detained following the arrest of Ekrem Imamoğlu. Ongun served as the Advisor to Mayor of Istanbul of the Metropolitan Municipality. He also the manager of Beylikdüzü Volleyball Specialized Women's Team and the volleyball branch manager.

== Biography ==
Ongun was Born in Ankara on 21 April 1975, and he was originally from Giresun, He completed his primary and secondary education in Giresun and his university education at Ankara University, Faculty of Communication.

=== Journalism ===
After graduating in 1996, he started working as the Ankara correspondent of Show Haber. Following years, he became Istanbul residence and continued his career at Star TV and ATV.

After the establishment of Habertürk TV on 3 September 2001, He continued to work in both reporter and managerial positions on the channel. Additionally he worked as a presenter on CNN Türk between 2012 and 2014.

=== Political career ===
After the 2014 Istanbul mayoral election, he served as an advisor to Ekrem İmamoğlu, who was elected as the Mayor of Beylikdüzü. Following the 2019 local elections, he was appointed as the Spokesperson of the Istanbul Metropolitan Municipality.

On 17 May 2022, after the Mayor of Istanbul Metropolitan Municipality, Ekrem İmamoğlu, announced that the position of IMM Spokesperson was abolished, his duty as spokesperson ended. Later, he continues to serve as the chairman of the board of directors at Medya A.Ş., a subsidiary of the Istanbul Metropolitan Municipality.

=== 2025 arrest ===
On 19 March 2025, Ongun was arrested by Turkish Police on charges related to alleged corruption along with Istanbul Mayor Ekrem İmamoğlu and more than 100 people.

== Personal life ==
Ongun married Gözdem Ongun have two children, he also speaks English. Additionality a member of the Galatasaray congress.

== Published works ==
- The Media's Civil War Turkish: Medyanın İç Savaşı
- Dark Story Turkish: Karanlık Hikaye
