= Poverty in Turkey =

Turkey made steady progress in reducing poverty from the early 2000s to the mid-2010s.

== Definitions ==
The Turkish Statistical Institute publishes rates of poverty at 40%, 50%, 60% and 70% of median equivalised household disposable income. UNICEF used the above 60% figure to estimate that over a third of children were poor on average 2019 to 2021. The World Bank’s poverty line for middle-income countries is $5.50 a day (in 2011 dollars).

== Rate of poverty ==
In 2023 the EU report on the country said "Türkiye still lacks a dedicated poverty reduction strategy. Sustained price increases further posed the risk of poverty for the unemployed and wage labourers in precarious jobs. The poverty rate reached 14.4%, up from 13.8% in 2021. The severe-material-deprivation rate reached 28.4% in 2022 (2021: 27.2%). The child poverty rate for 2022 was particularly high at 41.6%. In 2022, social assistance payments amounted to TRY 151.9 billion, or 1.01% of GDP. Türkiye has fragmented benefits at local and national level, and it still lacks a general minimum income scheme."

== Causes of poverty ==
- Female labor force participation was estimated by Turkstat as 30.4% in 2022, less than half that of men. Gender inequalities persist in access to economic opportunities and the female labor participation remains very low. Turkey ranked 130 out of 145 countries in the Global Gender Gap rankings. Female participation in the workplace has been increasing as a percentage and are forecasted to increase in a sustained way as Turkey transitions towards a high-income economy.
- Low productivity in the agriculture sector. Agriculture in Turkey employs about 20% of the working population with a very low labor productivity, which translates into limited earnings potential. While the Turkish agriculture remains the largest producer of hazelnut, cherry and apricot in the world, the average size of farms at 2 ha is very low and discourages investment opportunities.
- Low national savings rate and low FDI. Having a very low domestic savings rate, Turkey is dependent on capital inflows to finance its structural current account deficit. Despite its dependence on outside financing, Turkey attracts very little FDI—on average US$12.75 billion per year during 2003–2015.
- Exposure to natural disasters. Over 2 million Turks and more than 6% of Turkey's GDP are exposed to disasters at any given year—ranking 9th globally with respect to GDP exposure to earthquakes—because of Turkey's high risk of earthquakes, flooding and forest fires.
- Monetary policy. Most economists say that low interest rates in the early 2020s raised inflation. Poorer people have suffered more inflation.

== Poverty alleviation measures ==
- Establishment of universal health coverage in 2003.
- Seismic risk reduction program. Turkey pioneered a seismic mitigation and emergency preparedness project that has been a model internationally. The program—which started in 2006—addresses the vulnerability of public buildings through creating development standards and third-party review.
- Turkey's risk insurance scheme for private property—established in 1999—is considered to be a proactive and world-class example that other countries imitate. However, the insurance program does not have differentiating tariffs that could provide incentives for disaster-resistant construction.
- Islamic charity.

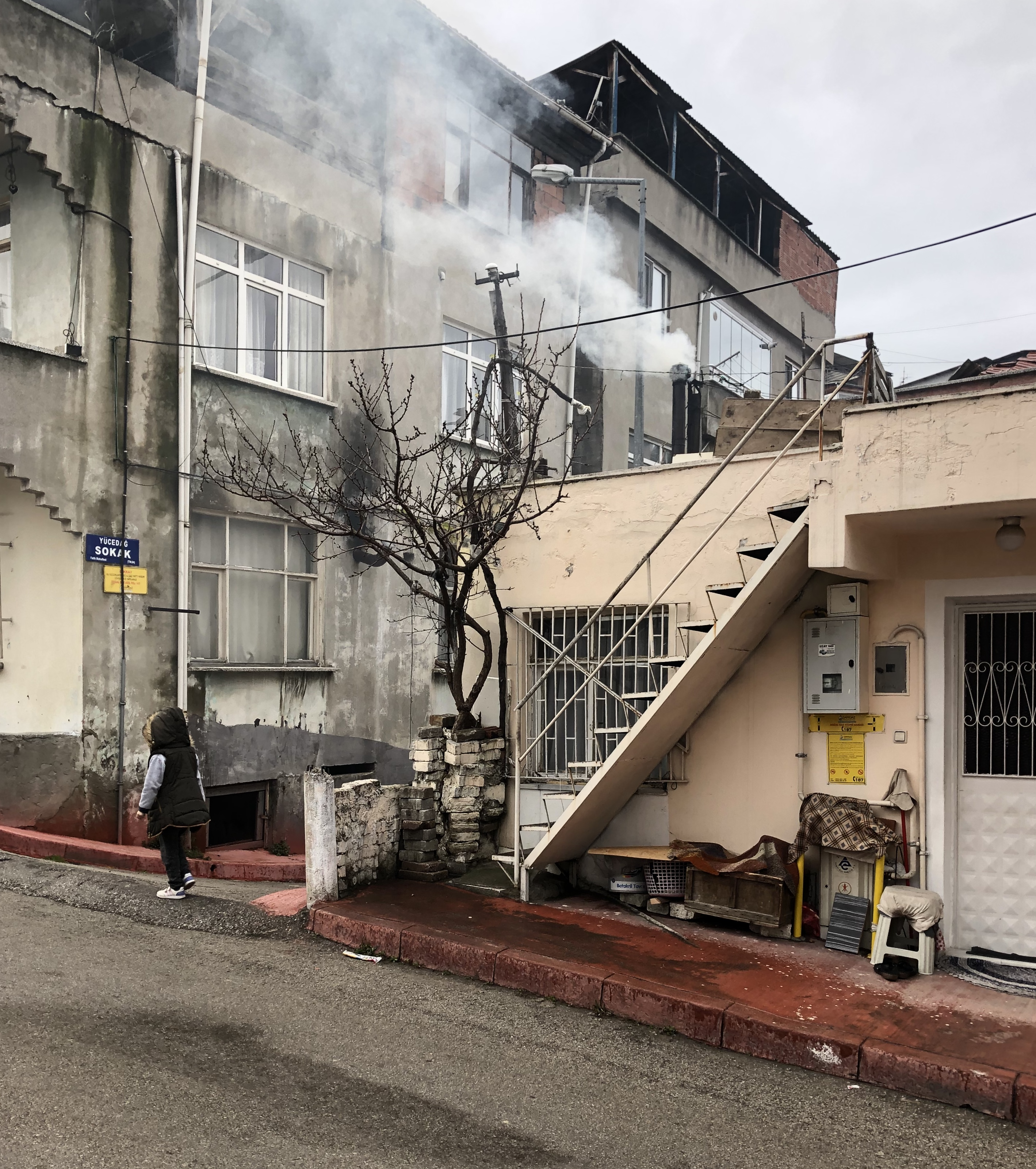
Gecekondu in the city of Samsun: poor people may be exposed to more air pollution in Turkey

== See also ==
Refugees of the Syrian civil war in Turkey
