= Village Law (Turkey) =

The Village Law (Turkish: Köy Kanunu; Law No. 442 of 1924) is a law of Turkey regarding the villages of that country.

== Provisions ==
Article 1 defines a village as a settlement with a population of less than 2,000 individuals.

=== Village headman and council of elders ===
Articles 9 through 11 of the Village Law regulate the positions of the headman (muhtar) and council of elders (köy ihtiyar heyeti), requiring that they be elected every four years by secret ballot. The headman is the link between the central government and the village. The law of 1924 also requires that a village is only a village if it has a Mosque. The law was substituted by the law No. 4916 of 2003.

=== Village guards ===
In 1985, Article 74 of the Village Law was amended to create the Temporary Village Guards (Geçici Köy Koruculuğu) system.

=== Provisions relating to foreigners ===
Article 87 of the Village Law originally barred foreigners (or companies under the control of foreigners) from owning land in Turkish villages. It was amended in 1984 to permit the Council of Ministers to grant an exception to the bar on foreign ownership. The Constitutional Court struck down this amendment. The legislature passed a similar amendment in 1986, which was also struck down. Article 87 was repealed in 2003 by Article 19 of the Law Concerning Amendments to Various Laws and the Statutory Decree Concerning the Organisation and Duties of the Ministry of Finance (Law No. 4916 of 2003).

As of 2012, Article 88 still bars foreigners from residing in Turkish villages without permission from the Ministry of the Interior.

== Amendments proposed in 2009 ==
Amendments to the Village Law were proposed in 2009. The law had been in force for 85 years without major reorganisation by that point.
