= Trial of Ekrem İmamoğlu =

2022 trial in Istanbul, Turkey

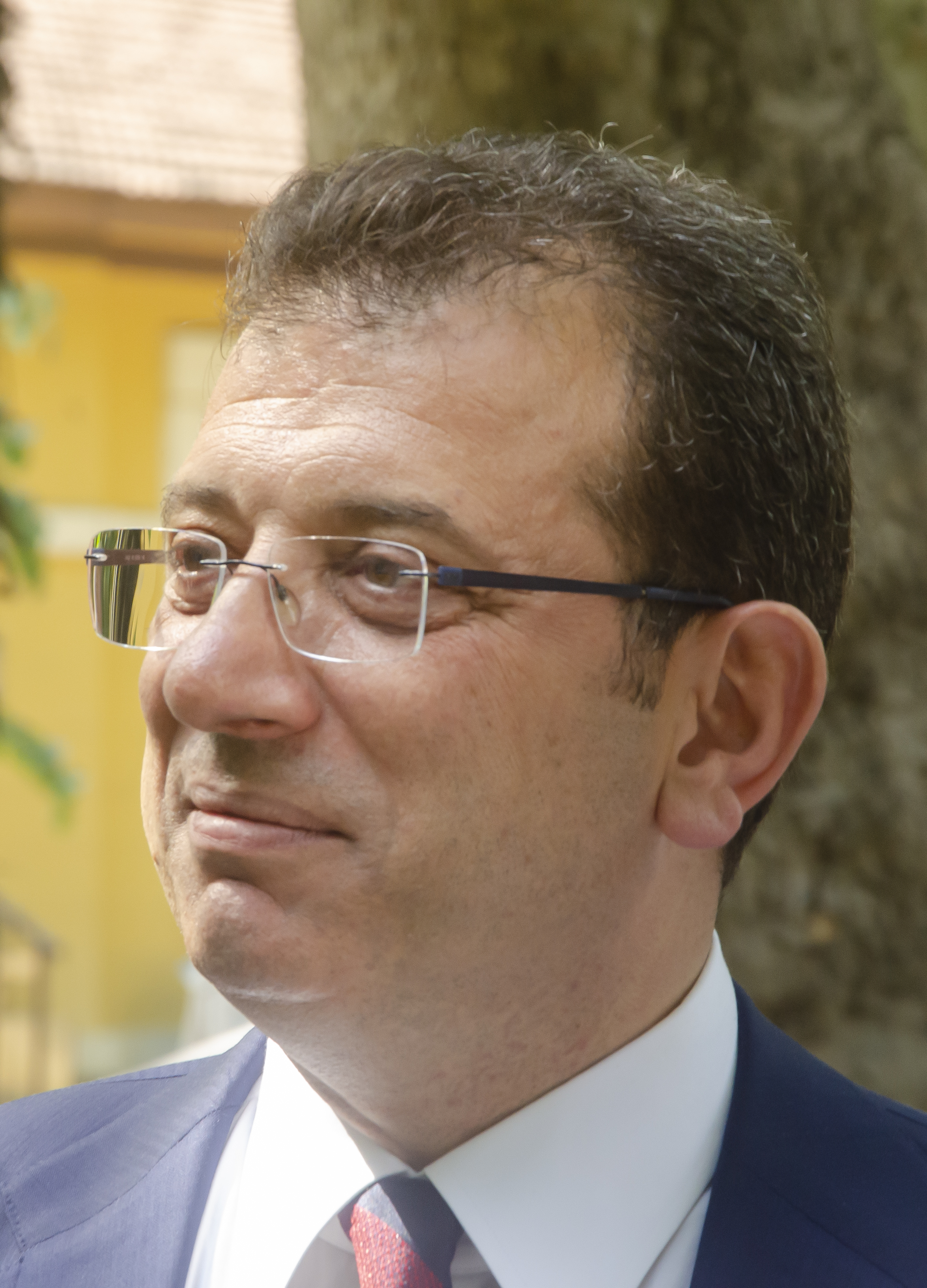
Ekrem İmamoğlu in June 2022.

The Mayor of Istanbul Ekrem İmamoğlu was put on trial for having insulted a public official. He was accused of calling the ones who canceled the Istanbul mayoral election of March 2019 "fools". The first hearing was in January 2022 and in December 2022 he was sentenced to 2 years, 7 months, and 15 days imprisonment and given a political ban in accordance with Article 53 of the Turkish Criminal Code. İmamoğlu has appealed the verdict, and his ban from politics does not apply as long as he is pending trial.

== Background ==
Ekrem İmamoğlu won the mayoral elections of Istanbul in March and June 2019. The first victory in March was canceled by the High Election Board (YSK) and a new election an organized for June. This election Imamoglu won again, that time with a larger margin.

In November 2019 Imamoglu answered a question of a reporter over the minister of the interior calling him a "fool" for criticizing the dismissal of elected mayors of the Peoples Democratic Party (HDP) and their replacement with appointed trustees before the Council of Europe. He answered that those responsible for cancelling the first mayoral elections of Istanbul in March 2019 were "foolish" as it would tarnish the international reputation of Turkey. In May 2021, Ekrem İmamoğlu was indicted for insulting public officials.

== Trial ==
The first hearing took place on 10 January 2022 in Istanbul. He defended himself that the "fool" part was not directed at the members of the YSK but at the Minister of the Interior Süleyman Soylu who had used the word "fool" to describe him. He also stated that he was of the view that it was the Government of Turkey who ordered the election to be canceled and not the electoral board.

The hearing in June was deferred to September 2022. It was further adjourned to November and in December 2022, the Court sentenced İmamoğlu to 2 years 7 months and 15 days imprisonment and a political ban according to Article 53 of the Turkish Criminal Law. A few days before the verdict, a judge of the court was sent to another court in the countryside and replaced. Ekrem İmamoğlu appealed the verdict.

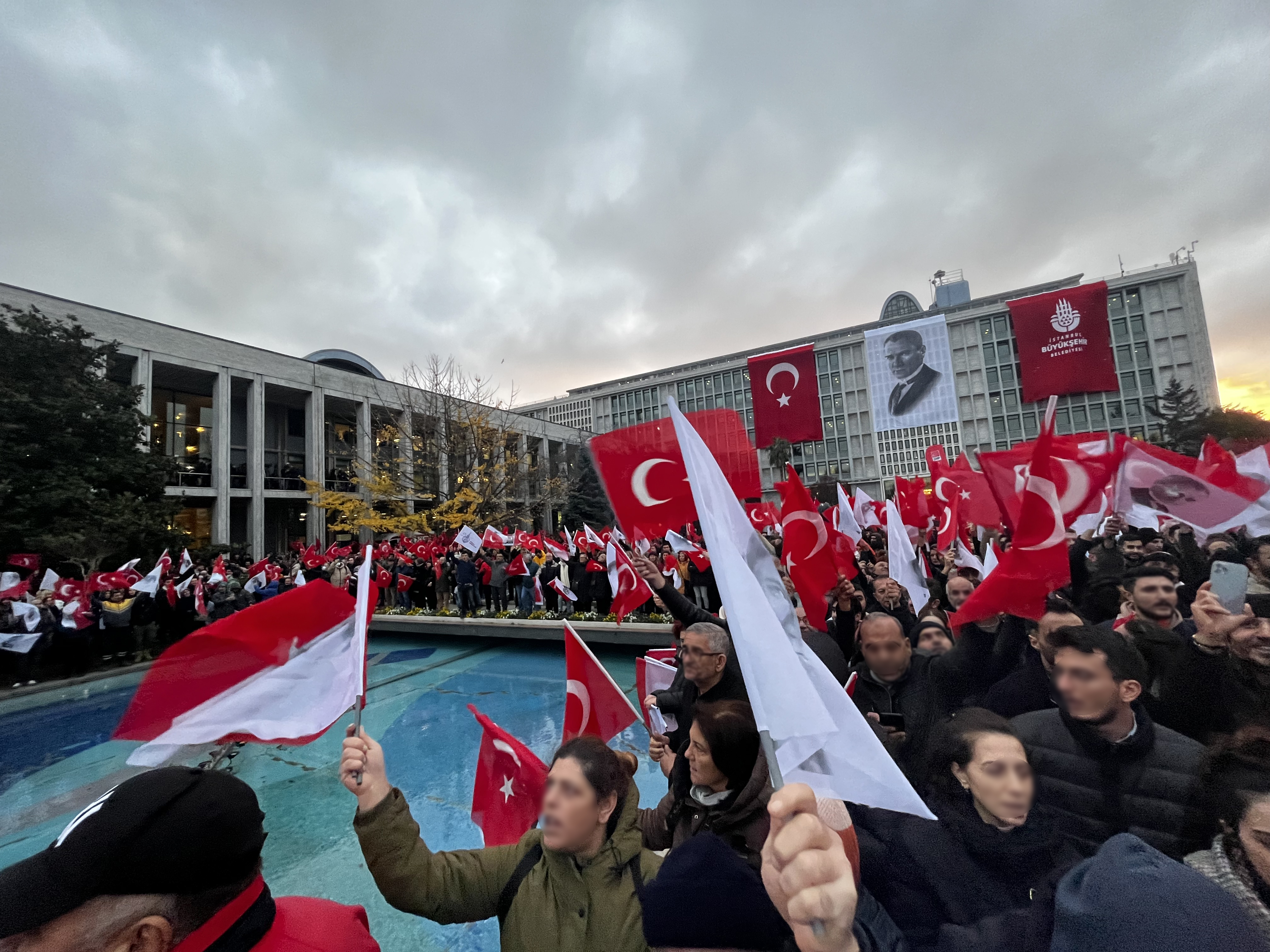
Protests in reaction of the verdict

== Reception ==
Several politicians condemned the verdict. Thousands of people held a rally in front of the Istanbul Municipality in support of İmamoğlu. The trial drew wide international condemnation and European mayors gathered at Istanbul in a show of support. Former president Abdullah Gül called the ruling not only an injustice to İmamoğlu but also to Turkey. According to a survey on the sentence, the majority of the surveyed also the voters for the ruling Justice and Development Party (AKP), and also international observers see it as a politically motivated verdict in support the electoral campaign of the current Turkish President Recep Tayyip Erdoğan.
