= Biostimulation =

Stimulation of microbes for bioremediation

Biostimulation involves the modification of the environment to stimulate existing bacteria capable of bioremediation. This can be done by addition of various forms of rate limiting nutrients and electron acceptors, such as phosphorus, nitrogen, oxygen, or carbon (e.g. in the form of molasses). Alternatively, remediation of halogenated contaminants in anaerobic environments may be stimulated by adding electron donors (organic substrates), thus allowing indigenous microorganisms to use the halogenated contaminants as electron acceptors. EPA Anaerobic Bioremediation Technologies Additives are usually added to the subsurface through injection wells, although injection well technology for biostimulation purposes is still emerging. Removal of the contaminated material is also an option, albeit an expensive one. Biostimulation can be enhanced by bioaugmentation. This process, overall, is referred to as bioremediation and is an EPA-approved method for reversing the presence of oil or gas spills. While biostimulation is usually associated with remediation of hydrocarbon or high production volume chemical spills, it is also potentially useful for treatment of less frequently encountered contaminant spills, such as pesticides, particularly herbicides.

The primary advantage of biostimulation is that bioremediation will be undertaken by already present native microorganisms that are well-suited to the subsurface environment, and are well distributed spatially within the subsurface. The primary disadvantage is that the delivery of additives in a manner that allows the additives to be readily available to subsurface microorganisms is based on the local geology of the subsurface. Tight, impermeable subsurface lithology (tight clays or other fine-grained material) make it difficult to spread additives throughout the affected area. Fractures in the subsurface create preferential pathways in the subsurface which additives preferentially follow, preventing even distribution of additives.

Recently a number of products have been introduced which allow popular use of bioremediation using biostimulative methods. They may harness local bacteria using biostimulation by creating a hospitable environment for hydrocarbon-devouring microorganisms, or they may introduce foreign bacteria into the environment as a direct application to the hydrocarbon. While the jury is out as to whether either is particularly more effective than the other, prima facie consideration suggests the introduction of foreign bacteria to any environment stands a chance of mutating organisms already present and affecting the biome.

Investigations to determine subsurface characteristics (such as natural groundwater velocity during ambient conditions, hydraulic conductivity of the subsurface, and lithology of the subsurface) are important in developing a successful biostimulation system. In addition, a pilot-scale study of the potential biostimulation system should be undertaken prior to full-scale design and implementation.

However, some biostimulative agents may be used in chaotic surfaces such as open water and sand so long as they are oleophilic, meaning that they bond exclusively to hydrocarbons, and basically sink in the water column, bonding to oil, where they then float to the water's surface, exposing the hydrocarbon to more abundant sunlight and oxygen where greater micro-organic aerobic activity can be encouraged. Some consumer-targeted biostimulants bond possess this quality, others do not.

== See also ==
- Biotreatment
