= Mühip Kanko =

Turkish physician and politician

Grand National Assembly of Turkey 28th Term Kocaeli Deputy
- Incumbent
- Assumed office 2023

Personal details
- Born: 1965 (age 60–61)
- Party: Republican People's Party
- Occupation: Physician, politician

Mühip Kanko (born 1965, Hozat, Tunceli, Turkey) is a Turkish physician and politician. He was a Republican People's Party Kocaeli deputy in the 28th term of the Grand National Assembly of Turkey.

== Life ==
He was born in 1965 in Hozat district of Tunceli Province. He is the grandson of Kankozade Hasan Hayri Bey, who was a Dersim deputy in the first term of the Grand National Assembly of Turkey. He graduated from Çukurova University Faculty of Medicine. He completed his specialization in Cardiovascular Surgery at Bursa Uludağ University. Since 1999, he has worked at Kocaeli University Faculty of Medicine, Cardiovascular Surgery Department. He received the title of professor in 2014.

== Politician career ==
In the 2015 general elections, he was a candidate for parliamentary nomination for the Republican People's Party (CHP), but did not make the candidate list. In 2016, he served as a member of CHP Kocaeli Provincial Executive Board.

In the 2018 general elections, he ran for Kocaeli 4th place parliamentary candidate; he was not elected to parliament.

In the 2023 general elections, he was nominated for Kocaeli 1st place and entered the 28th term of the Turkish Grand National Assembly as CHP Kocaeli deputy. He served in the Health, Family, Labor and Social Affairs Commission.

=== New Party ===
The 38th Ordinary Congress in November 2023 and the 21st Extraordinary Congress in April 2025 of the Republican People's Party (CHP) were ordered by a court to be annulled due to a ruling of "absolute nullity" issued in the lawsuit. As a result of the court order, interim suspension of the elected party leader Özgür Özel and the party leadership occurred, and Kemal Kılıçdaroğlu and the party bodies existing prior to the congress were restored, and continued to perform their duties. As the court-appointed leadership did not set an appropriate early new congress date, the founding of a new party became inevitable for a fraction of the party. 91 CHP parliamentarians, among them Kanko, resigned from their party, and founded the New Party on 24 July 2026.
