= Avi Melamed =

Israeli author and analyst

- Occupations: Author, Educator, Strategic Intelligence Analyst
- Employer(s): Fellow of Intelligence and Middle East Affairs at the Eisenhower Institute
- Known for: Expertise in Middle East affairs, Founder of Feenjan – Israel Speaks Arabic
- Notable work: Inside the Middle East: Making Sense of the Most Dangerous and Complicated Region on Earth (2016); Separate and Unequal (1999) (co-author)
- Website: www.avimelamed.com

Avi Melamed (Hebrew: אבי מלמד) is an Israeli author, educator, and independent Middle East strategic intelligence analyst. Melamed is an author of two books entitled: Inside the Middle East: Making Sense of the Most Dangerous and Complicated Region on Earth (2016) and co-author of Separate and Unequal (1999).

== Career ==
Melamed is a former senior official on Arab affairs and an Israeli intelligence official. He is an expert on current affairs in the Muslim and Arab society and their effect on the Middle East and Israel. He also serves as the Fellow of Intelligence and Middle East Affairs for the Eisenhower Institute.

He has been involved in an array of intelligence field positions on behalf of Israeli government agencies and Israel Defense Forces. Melamed is also known as the founder of Feenjan – Israel Speaks Arabic, an online medium for Arabs and Israelis to engage in various issues and discussions. The topics and discussions are centered on the latest trends of the Israeli culture and the Arab world in Arabic.

== Books ==
- Inside the Middle East: Making Sense of the Most Dangerous and Complicated Region on Earth. Skyhorse Publishing. 2016. ISBN 9781634505727.
- Separate and Unequal: The Inside Story of Israeli Rule in East Jerusalem. Harvard University Press. 2001. ISBN 9780674005532.
