= Eastern Anatolia Project =

Regional development project in Turkey

The Eastern Anatolia Project (Turkish: Doğu Anadolu Projesi, DAP) is a comprehensive regional development program being employed by the Turkish government with the objective of improving conditions in, as of 2022, 15 cities considered to be situated in the Eastern Anatolia region of Turkey. The DAP Master Plan aims at developing the region under three main aspects: Social, Economic, and Environmental. The specific areas of intended development are healthcare, education, agriculture, tourism, infrastructure, and manufacturing.

DAP's master plan was completed in the year 2000, its structure finalized in 2006, and its projects started being implemented in 2011. As of 2022, all the projects are being controlled by the Eastern Anatolian Project Regional Development Executive Department, a branch of the Ministry of Industry and Technology that was established with this sole purpose. For the year 2021 the total budget of this organization was slightly over 100 million Turkish liras.

Current activities under DAP include construction of irrigation systems, cattle barns, greenhouses, libraries, community centers, tourist centers, schools, healthcare facilities, restoration of historical sites, financing of manufacturing equipment, and administration of educational programs. Major activities between 2014 and 2018 included the completion of irrigation networks for 168,417 acres of farmland, rehabilitation of 133,778 acres of pastures, construction of 847 miles of roads, building of 14,414 classrooms, establishment of 43 new state hospitals, and inauguration of 130 community libraries.

== History ==
Efforts for developing rural areas in Turkey date back to the establishment of the Republic. The first major action taken for improvement of rural socio-economic conditions was the ratification of the Village Law in 1924. This was followed by the Village Institutes program in 1940. The first major specialized development project in Eastern Anatolia was the Erzurum Rural Development Project, which started in 1982. Some example accomplishments of this project were the delivery of drinking water to 192 villages, vaccination of 12.5 million herd animals, and establishment of 580 beehives.

By 1998, two other major projects were initiated, namely the Erzincan-Sivas and Eastern Anatolia Development Program, which encompassed Erzurum, Kars, and Ardahan. However, noting the need for a larger-scale development instead of few cities at a time, the State Planning Organization started the project dubbed the Eastern Anatolia Project (Turkish acronym: DAP) in 1998. As a first step for DAP, a Master Plan was developed with the collaboration of Atatürk University from Erzurum, Fırat University from Elazığ, İnönü University from Malatya, Kafkas University from Kars, and Yüzüncü Yıl University from Van. These 5 universities were guided by a team from Ankara and the Master Plan management was from Gazi University.

The Master Plan presented the detailed analysis of socio-economic conditions and feasibility studies for 64 potential development projects for the following 16 cities: Agrı, Ardahan, Bayburt, Bingöl, Bitlis, Elazığ, Erzincan, Erzurum, Gümüşhane, Hakkari, Iğdır, Kars, Malatya, Muş, Tunceli, and Van. The concept of development was categorized into three groups: social, economic, and environmental. The projects for the feasibility studies were envisioned respecting the focus areas established in the Master Plan, which were: utilization of human resources to the fullest extent, strengthening of social support organizations, improvement of pastures, improvement of infrastructure, providing means for self-employment, diversification and bolstering of financial sources, and the betterment of environmental conditions.

Within four years after the 2002 General Election, by 2006, the framework of the DAP program was completed. In 2011, the Eastern Anatolian Project Regional Development Executive Department (DAP Kalkınma İdaresi BaskanlığI, or DAPKİB in Turkish), was established, modeled after the one overseeing the prominent Southeastern Anatolia Project (GAP). This department has been implementing DAP with 2-4 year development plans since 2011.
