= Kurt Erdmann =

German art historian

- Born: 9 September 1901; Hamburg, Germany
- Died: 30 September 1964 (aged 63); Berlin, Germany
- Other name: K. Sören Erdmann
- Spouse: Hanna Erdmann

Academic background
- Education: University of Hamburg
- Thesis: Der architektonische Bogen als Kunstform (1927)
- Doctoral advisor: Erwin Panofsky

Academic work
- Discipline: Islamic art history
- Sub-discipline: Oriental rugs Sasanian art Anatolian Seljuk architecture
- Institutions: Museum of Islamic Art, Berlin (1927–1944); Friedrich Wilhelm University of Berlin (1941–1944); University of Hamburg (1945–1951); Istanbul University (1951–1958); Museum of Islamic Art, Berlin (1958–1964)
- Doctoral students: Nurhan Atasoy
- Notable students: Cengiz Bektaş
- Notable works: Oriental Carpets: An Account of Their History (1955); Die Kunst Irans zur Zeit der Sasaniden (1943); Das anatolische Karavansaray des 13. Jahrhunderts (1961)

Kurt Erdmann (9 September 1901 in Hamburg – 30 September 1964 in Berlin) was a German art historian who specialised in Sasanian and Islamic art of Iran, Turkey and Egypt. He is best known for his scientific work on the history of the Oriental rug, which he established as a subspeciality within his discipline. He also influenced the study of Islamic architecture in Turkey. From 1958 to 1964, Erdmann served as the director of the Museum of Islamic Art, Berlin. He was one of the protagonists of the Berlin School of Islamic Art History.

== Life ==
Erdmann was born in Hamburg as the elder of two children of Friedrich, a German overseas merchant during the peak period of New Imperialism who died of malaria in British Sierra Leone in 1904, and Alma née Sörensen, a Dane.

After graduating from a Hamburg Realgymnasium in 1919, Erdmann studied German literature at the University of Hamburg (1920/21) and the University of Tübingen (1921), then shifted to European art history at Marburg University (1922/23). With the onset of the 1923 economic crisis, he turned to work in antiquities trade for Adolf Gottschewski, the subsequent co-director of the Dr. Gottschewski – Dr. Schäffer art gallery in Berlin. He resumed his studies in art history at Hamburg in 1925 and completed his PhD thesis on Der architektonische Bogen als Kunstform under the supervision of Erwin Panofsky there in 1927. Although he came to know Aby Warburg and maintained a correspondence with Warburg's successor Fritz Saxl, he rejected the iconological approach of the Warburg School, to which his supervisor belonged, regarding it as "one-sided".

In July 1927, he joined the Museum of Islamic Art in Berlin (then part of the Emperor Frederick Museum), initially as an unpaid volunteer. He developed a life-long interest in oriental carpets while preparing the bibliography and plate descriptions for the museum director Friedrich Sarre's second volume of Alt-orientalische Teppiche, which appeared in 1928, and began to study Sasanian art through contact with Sarre's work as well. He became involved in the Berlin carpet trade alongside the museum's senior carpet expert Ernst Kühnel by writing auction catalogues. In 1929, he received the paid position of contract negotiator at the museum, but continued to supplement his income from antiquities trade (he catalogued the Jakob Goldschmidt collection during 1927–1930) and writing book reviews. In 1932, he was permanently hired by the museum's new director Ernst Kühnel and along with Richard Ettinghausen helped set up the new galleries of the Pergamon Museum to which the Islamic department was transferred in that year. Among his colleagues there was Katharina Otto-Dorn. After Adolf Hitler's rise to power in 1933, Erdmann was receptive to National Socialist ideas, left the Protestant Church and joined some organisations linked to the Nazi Party. He was promoted to scientific assistant in 1934, published a best-selling album of European paintings, and lectured at the Lessing High School in Berlin in 1936. In 1935–36, he surveyed the medieval and early modern Middle Eastern art holdings across Germany. He travelled across Europe (including to Leningrad, Moscow and Warsaw in 1936) and to Egypt during the 1930s. He made a single study visit to Istanbul in the winter of 1937/1938, examining the carpet collections extensively and meeting with the Turkish archaeologist Halil Edhem Eldem. He oversaw the display of the Islamic collections during the 6th International Congress of Archaeology in Berlin in April 1939.

Erdmann's academic career began with a visiting professorship at the Egyptian University in Cairo in 1938. Although the museum was closed after the German invasion of Poland in September 1939, he remained employed there during World War II and pursued writing. In 1941, he worked on cataloguing Max von Oppenheim's collection. In 1942, he completed a survey of the development of the knotted-pile carpet titled Die Formenwelt des Orientteppichs that remained unpublished. He underwent interpreter training as part of a special Wehrmacht unit (Dolmetscherkompanie) near Berlin in the same year, and worked on an unknown project there. From the summer term of 1943, he lectured in Iranian archaeology at the Friedrich Wilhelm University of Berlin. He was called up to his interpreters' unit in the Wehrmacht in the autumn of 1944, while employed as a curator at the Museum of Islamic Art and shortly after being recommended for the position of Honorarprofessor. He was released from American captivity for residence in Hamburg in the British occupation zone, where he lectured at the university from 1946 and was appointed Honorarprofessor of Islamic art and Iranian archaeology in 1948. He held a visiting professorship at the University of Bonn from 1949.

Erdmann replaced Ernst Diez as the chair of Turkish and Islamic art history at Istanbul University in January 1951. He also lectured on pre-Islamic Turkish art and Turkish architecture at the State Academy of the Fine Arts. He completed 52 research trips across Anatolia, initially in the company of his second wife Hanna née Meurer (who had learned Turkish and prepared drawings), and from 1953 to 1958 jointly with his academic assistant and translator Oktay Aslanapa, the Ottomanist Franz Taeschner, and his own Turkish students, among them Nurhan Atasoy and the architect Cengiz Bektaş. He used the fieldwork to explore the Islamic architectural legacy of Anatolia in all its variety, breaking with the selective approach of his predecessors, and his methods had a significant influence on the young generation of Turkish art historians. In the summer of 1956, he spent three months researching art collections in the United States. He also travelled to Iran in 1957 and to Cairo, Syria, Lebanon and Jordan in 1958.

From October 1958 until his death in 1964, Erdmann was head of the Museum of Islamic Art, a department of the Berlin State Museums. He lectured at the University of Hamburg at the invitation of Bertold Spuler and Wolfgang Schöne, and was a full member of the German Archaeological Institute. He oversaw an expansion of the Islamic collections through the opening of the Dahlem complex.

== Work ==
Kurt Erdmann followed in the footsteps of Wilhelm von Bode, Friedrich Sarre and Ernst Kühnel as the fourth director of the Museum of Islamic Art in Berlin and a leading representative of the Berlin School of Islamic Art History. The school developed the "terminus ante quem" dating method based on reproductions of Oriental carpets in Renaissance painting.

Erdmann was the first to describe the "four social layers" of carpet production (nomadic, village, town and court manufacture). He recognised the traditions of village and nomad carpet designs as a distinct artistic tradition on its own, and described the process of stylization by which, over time, elaborate manufactory designs and patterns were integrated into the village and nomadic weaving traditions. Until Erdmann published his studies, art historians influenced by Alois Riegl's nineteenth-century Vienna School used to understand the process of pattern migration from court and town to village and nomad as a degeneration. Consequently, art historians focused more on the elaborate manufactory rug designs, which they saw as the most authentic. Erdmann was among the first to draw attention to the village, tribal, and nomadic rugs as a distinct and genuine form of artistic expression.

Erdmann also established the structural analysis as a means to determine the historical framework of rug weaving traditions within the Islamic world. The replacement of floral and foliate ornaments by geometrical designs, and the substitution of the earlier "infinite repeat" by large, centered compositions of ornaments, occurring during the turn between the fifteenth and sixteenth century was first described by Erdmann, and termed the "pattern", or "carpet design revolution".

While oriental rugs and Sasanian art were his two main fields of interest, Erdmann also worked on a variety of other subjects, including Achaemenid art, and Turkish roadside inn architecture. His work at the Berlin museum resulted in publications on groups and single works of pre-Islamic and Islamic art, including detailed descriptions of acquisitions made by the Berlin Museum. Erdmann's books are still cited by present-time textbooks on oriental rugs.

== Publications ==
=== Books ===
- Das iranische Feuerheiligtum, Leipzig: Johann Conrad Hinrichs, 1941.
- Die Kunst Irans zur Zeit der Sasaniden, Berlin: Florian Kupferberg, 1943; 2nd ed. Mainz: Kupferberg Verlag, 1969.
- Orientalische Teppiche aus vier Jahrhunderten. Ausstellung im Museum für Kunst und Gewerbe, Hamburg, 22. August bis 22. Oktober 1950, Hamburg: Museum für Kunst und Gewerbe, 1950.
- Der orientalische Knüpfteppich. Versuch einer Darstellung seiner Geschichte, Tübingen: Ernst Wasmuth Verlag, 1955.
  - English translation by Charles Grant Ellis: Oriental Carpets: An Essay on Their History, New York: Universe, 1960 (UK ed. as Oriental Carpets: An Account of Their History, London: Zwemmer, 1960).
- Der türkische Teppich des 15. Jahrhunderts = 15. Asir Türk Halisi (Turkish text by H. Tamer), Istanbul: Maarif Basimevi, 1957.
  - English translation by Robert Pinner: The History of the Early Turkish Carpet, London: Oguz Press, 1977, ISBN 9780905820026.
- with Hanna Erdmann: Das anatolische Karavansaray des 13. Jahrhunderts, 3 vols., Berlin: Gebrüder Mann, 1961–1976 (vol. I).
- Europa und der Orientteppich, Berlin: F. Kupferberg, 1962.
- Ibn Bibi als kunsthistorische Quelle, İstanbul: Nederlands Historisch-Archaeologisch Instituut in het Nabije Oosten, 1962.
- Siebenhundert Jahre Orientteppich. Zu seiner Geschichte und Erforschung, ed. Hanna Erdmann, Herford: Bussesche Verlagshandlung, 1966.
  - English translation by May Hamilton Beattie and Hildegard Herzog: Seven Hundred Years of Oriental Carpets, Berkeley: University of California Press, 1970, ISBN 9780520018167 (UK ed. London: Faber & Faber).
- Iranische Kunst in deutschen Museen, ed. Hanna Erdmann, Wiesbaden: Franz Steiner Verlag, 1967.

=== Selected articles ===
- "Der Bogen. Eine Studie zur Geschichte der Architektur". Jahrbuch für Kunstwissenschaft, 1929, pp. 100–144, JSTOR 24496221.
- "Persische Teppiche der Safawidenzeit." Pantheon Nr. 5, 1932, pp. 227–231.
- "Die sasanidischen Jagdschalen. Untersuchungen zur Entwicklung der iranischen Edelmetallkunst unter den Sasaniden", Jahrbuch der Preussischen Kunstsammlungen Nr. 57, 1936, pp. 193–232.
- "Eine unbekannte sasanidische Jagdschale", Jahrbuch der Preussischen Kunstsammlungen, Nr. 59, 1938, pp. 209–217, JSTOR 25170031.
- "Zur Chronologie der sasanidischen „Jagdschalen“", Zeitschrift der Deutschen Morgenländischen Gesellschaft Nr. 97, 1943, pp. 239–283, JSTOR 43375401.
- "Das Datum des Tāḳ-i Bustān", Ars Islamica Nr. 4, 1937, pp. 79–97, JSTOR 25167031.
- "Islamische Bergkristallarbeiten", Jahrbuch der Preussischen Kunstsammlungen, 61.4, 1940, pp. 125–146, JSTOR 45435715.
- "Die Keramik von Afrasiyab", Berliner Museen Nr. 63, 1942, pp. 18–28.
- "Zur Deutung der iranischen Felsreliefs", Forschungen und Fortschritte Nr. 18, 1942, pp. 209–211.
- "Sasanidische Felsreliefs — Römische Historienreliefs", Antike und Abendland Nr. 3, de Gruyter, 1948.
- "Die universalgeschichtliche Stellung der sasanidischen Kunst", Saeculum Nr. 1, 1950, pp. 508–534, doi:10.7788/saeculum-1950-0126.
- "Die Entwicklung der sassanidischen Krone", Ars Islamica Nr. 15/16, 1951, pp. 87–123, JSTOR 4515669.
- "Arabische Schriftzeichen als Ornamente in der abendländischen Kunst des Mittelalters", Abhandlungen der Akademie der Wissenschaften und der Literatur in Mainz. Geistes- und sozialwissenschaftliche Klasse, Jahrgang 1953. Nr. 9. pp. 467–513.
- "Die fatimidischen Bergkristallkannen", Forschungen zur Kunstgeschichte und christlichen Archäologie, 2, 1953, pp. 189–205.
- "Notizen zum inneranatolischen Karavansaray. Beobachtungen auf einer Reise im Juli 1953", Kunst des Orients, 2, 1955, pp. 5–29, JSTOR 20752296.
- "Zur türkischen Baukunst seldschukischer und osmanischer Zeit", Istanbuler Mitteilungen, 8, 1958, pp. 1–39.
- "Seraybauten des dreizehnten und vierzehnten Jahrhunderts in Anatolien", Ars Orientalis, 3, 1959, pp. 77–94, JSTOR 4629100.
- "Neue islamische Bergkristalle", Ars Orientalis, 3, 1959, pp. 201–205, JSTOR 4629111.
- "Persepolis: Daten und Deutungen", Mitteilungen der Deutschen Orient-Gesellschaft zu Berlin, 92, 1960, pp. 31–47.
- "Keramische Erwerbungen der Islamischen Abteilung 1958–1960", Berliner Museen, Nr. 10, 1961, pp. 6–15.
- "Neuerworbene Gläser der Islamischen Abteilung 1958–1961", Berliner Museen, 11, 1961, pp. 31–41, JSTOR 4238214.
- with Peter W. Meister: introduction to Kaukasische Teppiche. Ausstellung 17.11–16.12.1962. Museum für Kunsthandwerk Frankfurt, Frankfurt: Museum für Kunsthandwerk, 1962.
- "Neue Arbeiten zur türkischen Keramik", Ars Orientalis, 5, 1963, pp. 191–219, JSTOR 4629189.
- "Carpets East Carpets West", Saudi Aramco World, 1965, pp. 8–9.

== Bibliography ==
- Ettinghausen, Richard (1965), "Kurt Erdmann", Der Islam, 41: 253–260, doi:10.1515/islm.1965.41.1.253.
- Kröger, Jens (2023), "Kurt Erdmann (1901–1964)" (PDF), Journal of Art Historiography, 28: 1–26, doi:10.48352/uobxjah.00004270.
- Wimmel, Robin; Bozkurt, Tolga (2012), "Zwei ‚bahnbrechende' Forschungsreisende in Anatolien: Edmund Naumann und Kurt Erdmann", in Schönig, Claus; Bayraktar, Hatice; Çalık, Ramazan (eds.), Türkisch-deutsche Beziehungen. Perspektiven aus Vergangenheit und Gegenwart (in German), Berlin: Klaus Schwarz Verlag, pp. 234–258, ISBN 978-3-87997-386-6.
