= İşbank Museum (Ankara) =

Museum in Turkey

Coordinates: 39°56′34″N 32°51′17″E

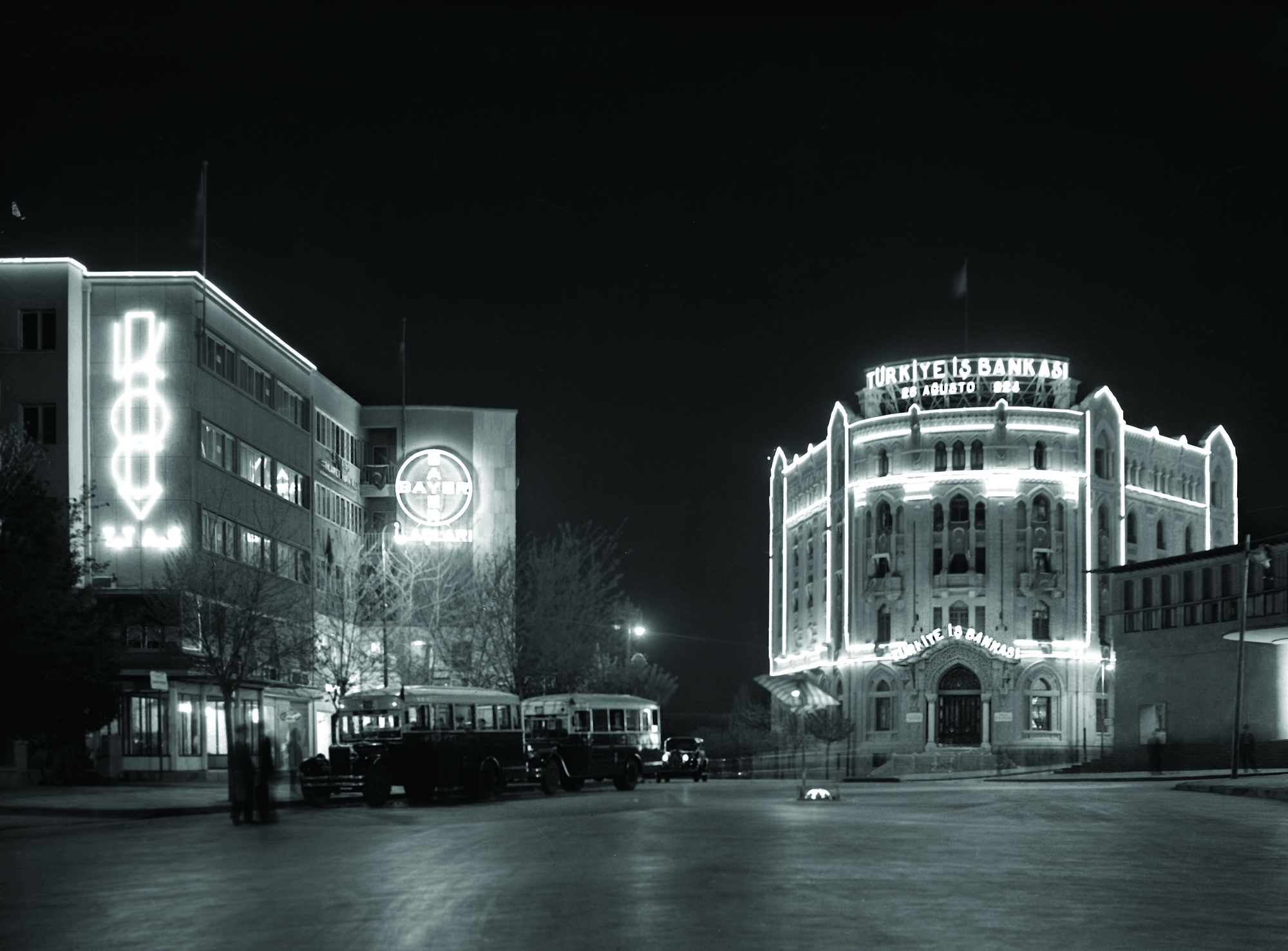
1941 night photo of the building (right)

İşbank Museum is a museum in Ankara, Turkey. The official name of the museum is "Economic Independence Museum" (Türkiye İş Bankası İktisadi Bağımsızlık Müzesi). This is the second museum of the bank the first being the İşbank Museum in Istanbul. The museum is in Ulus Square facing the Victory Monument.

== Building ==
The five-stories-high building was built in 1929 as the headquarters of Türkiye İş Bankası (İşbank for short). Its architect was Giulio Mongeri. Later, it was also used as the Ankara Ulus Heykel branch office of the bank. However, the area around Ulus square was planned as a cultural center of Ankara with such museums as the Republic Museum and the War of Independence Museum. The executive board of the bank decided to convert the building into a museum as a part of the cultural center.

== Museum ==
The museum was opened on 2 May 2019. The creators of the museum were Burçak Madran and Emre Senan and the consultant is Professor Zafer Toprak. Füsun Tümsavaş, the chairperson of the executive board and Adnan Bali the general director hosted the Minister of Culture and Tourism during the opening ceremony. The museum focuses on the Turkish economy. The original safe deposit boxes are displayed in the basement and the bank tellers' offices are displayed in the ground floor. There is a book store next to the main gate. The historical meeting rooms, as well as an oil painting of Kurt Bullent, are on the first floor. One of the meeting rooms is a room which hosted Kemal Atatürk, the founder of Turkey, during his visit to the bank. In the second floor various documents and early banking commercials are displayed. The third floor is reserved for art exhibitions and the fourth floor which is called permanent exhibition is reserved for the Turkish War of Independence. The fifth floor is planned for future activities.

== Visiting hours ==
The museum is open every day except Mondays between 10:00–18:00.

== Gallery ==
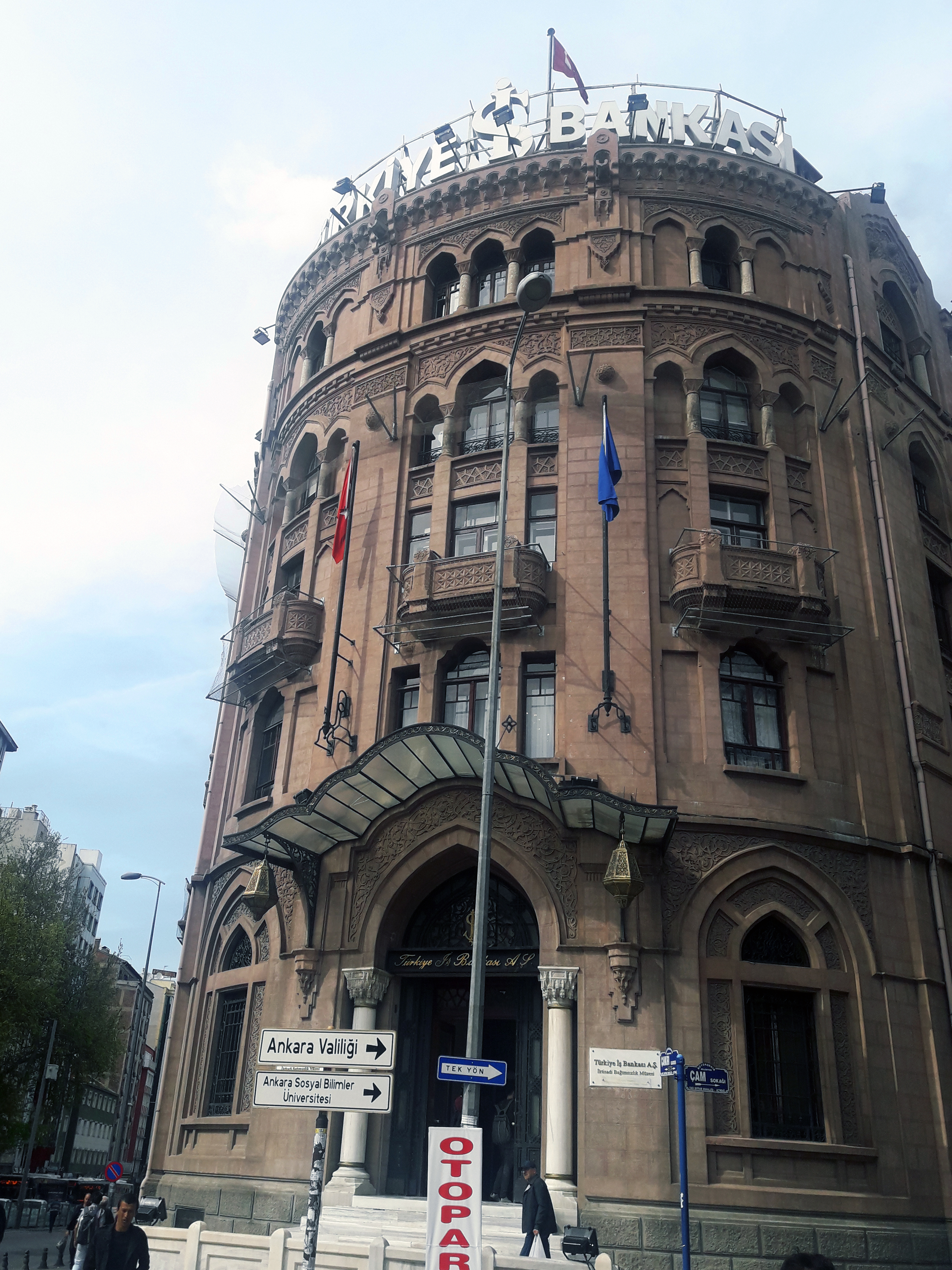
Ankara İşbank Museum, entrance

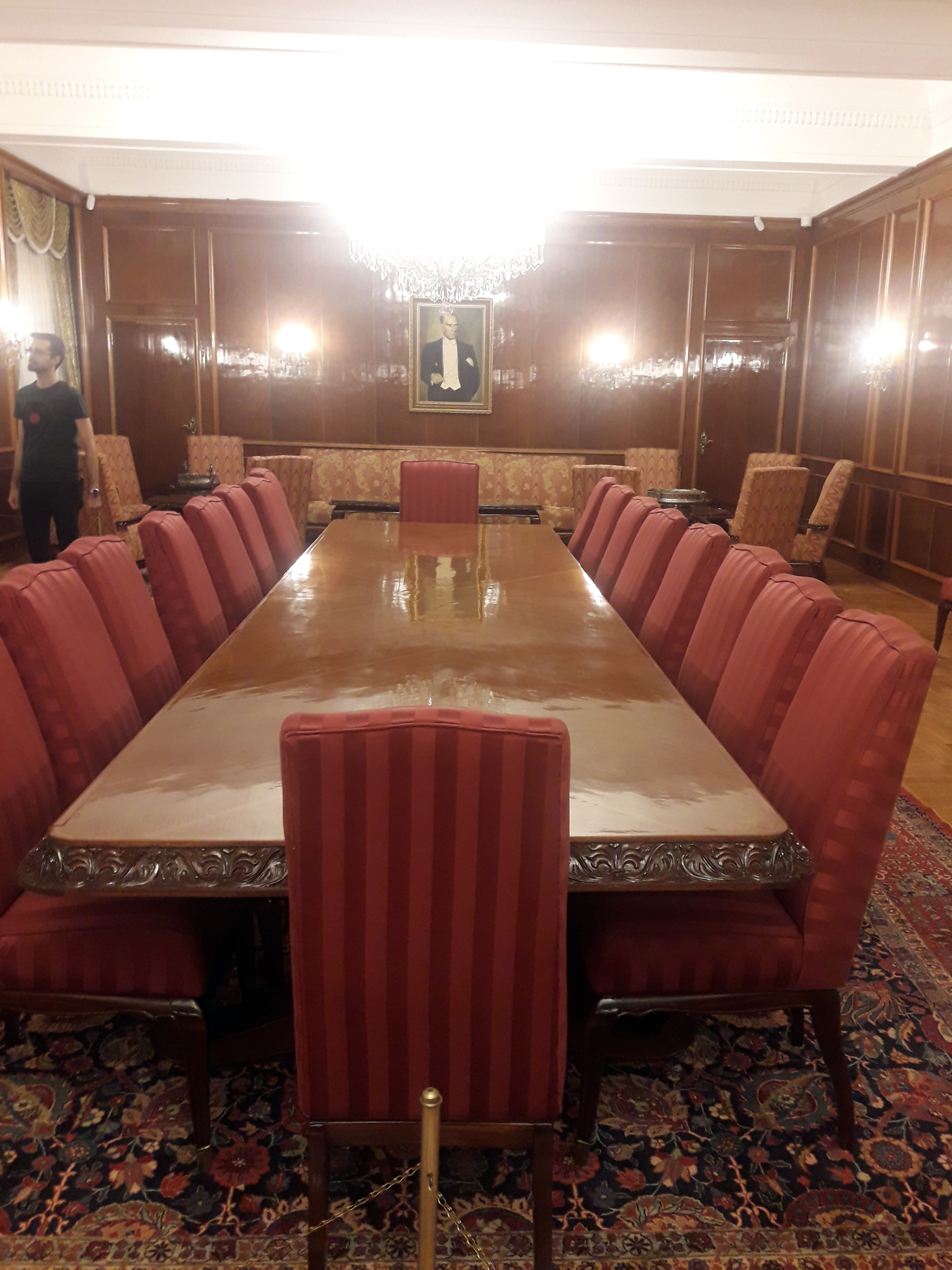
Ankara İşbank Museum, meeting room

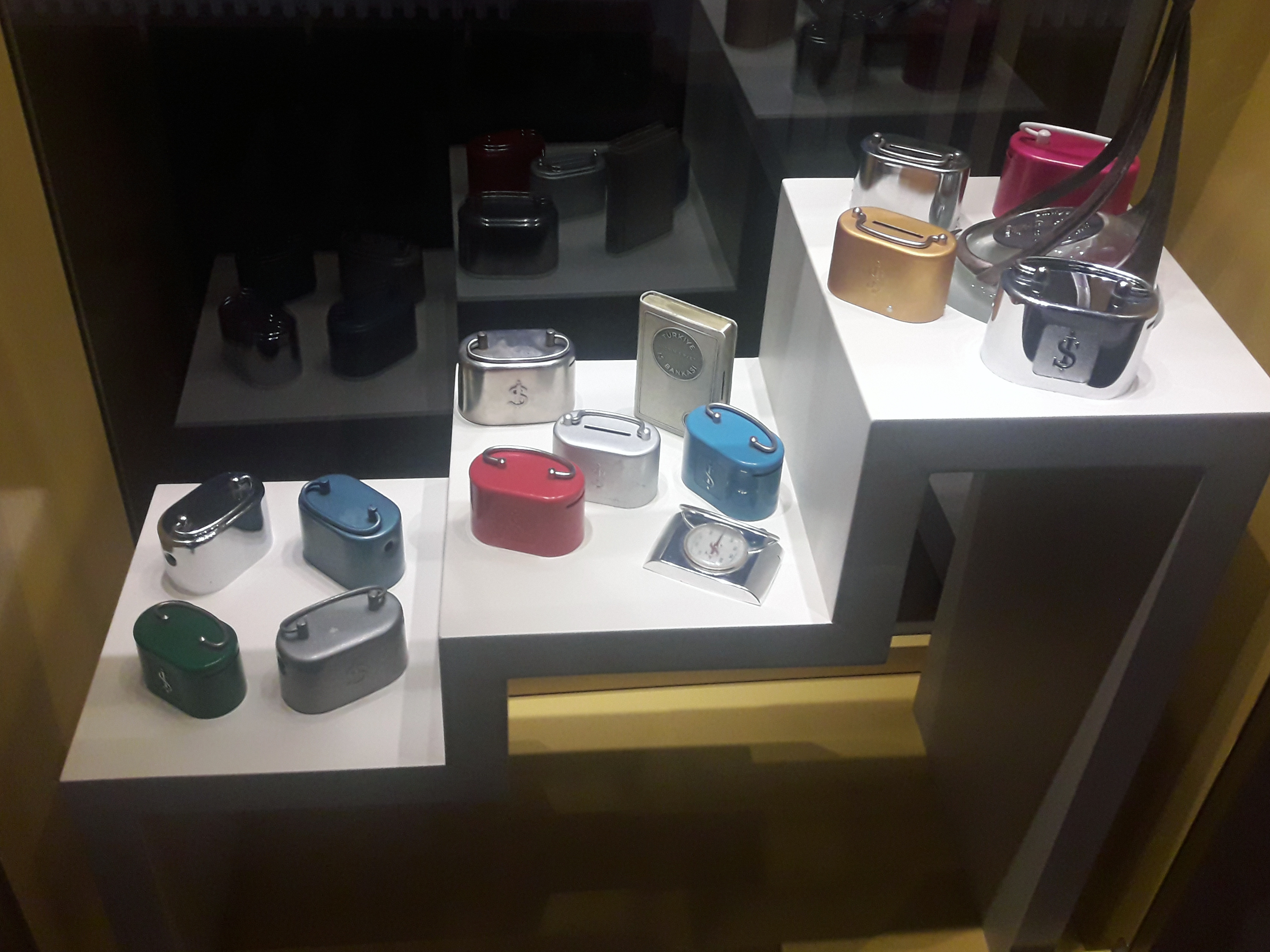
Ankara İşbank Museum, penny banks of the bank

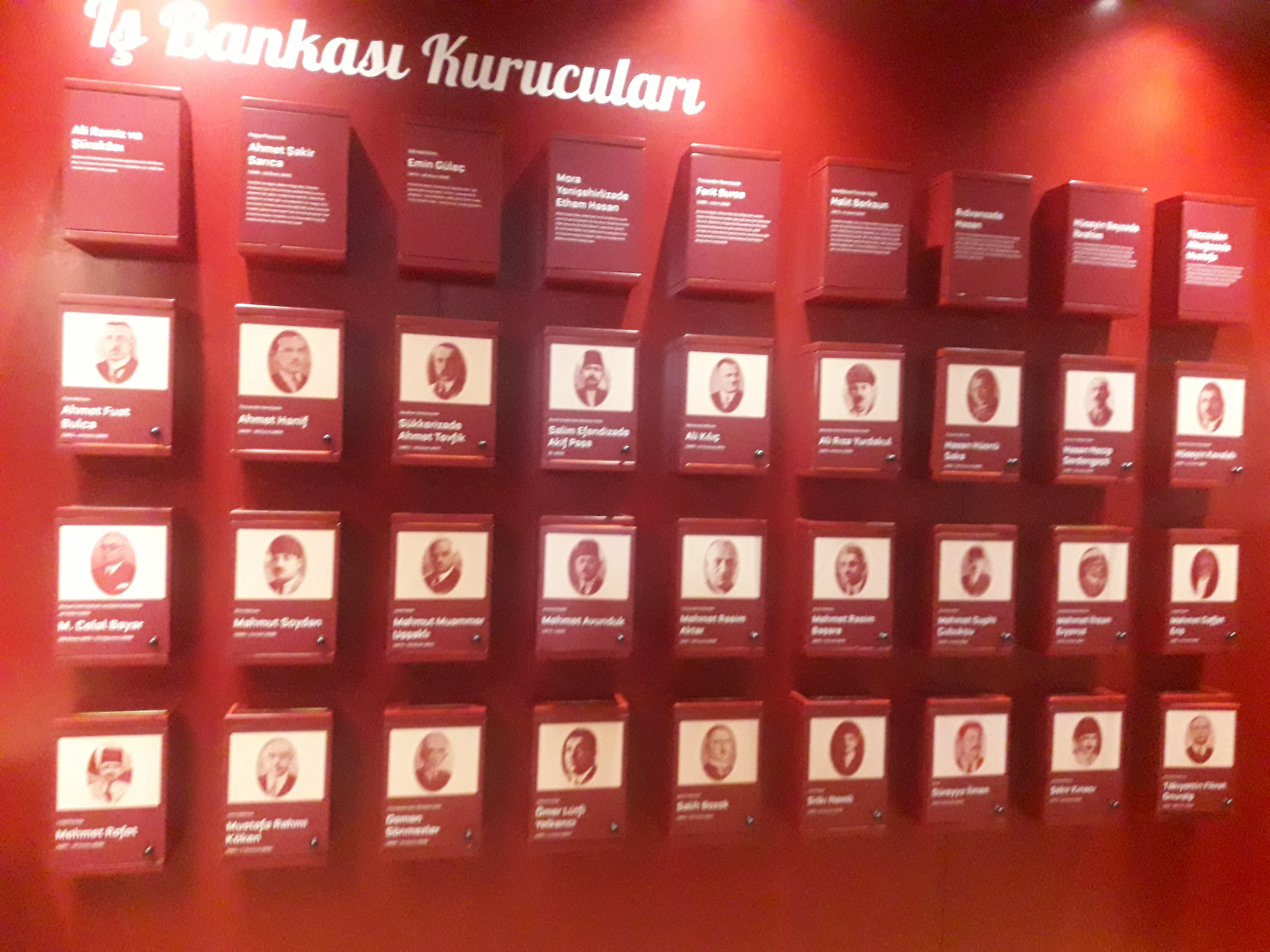
Ankara İşbank Museum, gallery of the founders
