= Oliver Schmitt =

Swiss historian and professor (born 1973)

Oliver Jens Schmitt
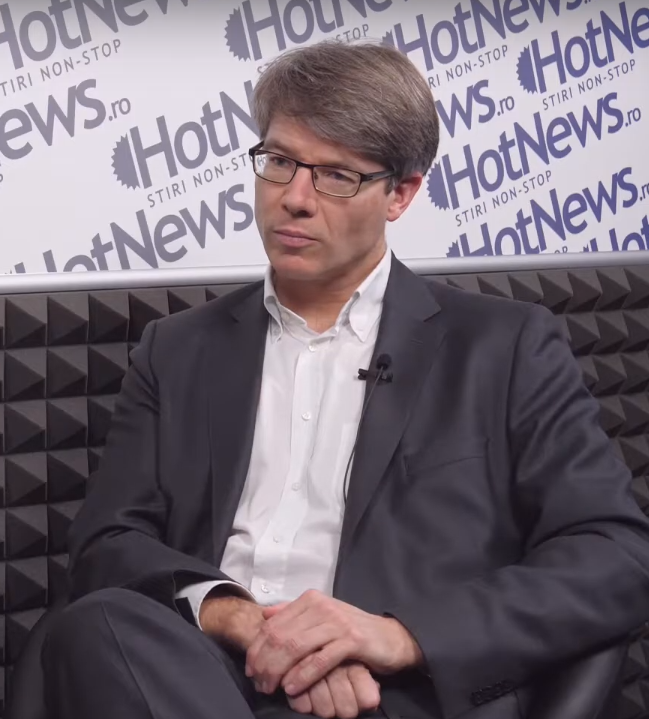
- Schmitt in an interview given to the Romanian newspaper HotNews
- Born: 15 February 1973 (age 53); Basel, Switzerland
- Occupation: historian
- Known for: a member of the Austrian Academy of Sciences and expert on Medieval Albania

Oliver Jens Schmitt (born 15 February 1973) is a Swiss historian and professor of South-East European history at Vienna University since 2005. He is a member of the Austrian Academy of Sciences.

== Biography ==
Schmitt was born on 15 February 1973 in Basel, Switzerland.

== Works ==
His book Skanderbeg. Der neue Alexander auf dem Balkan, a critical biography of George Castrioti-Skanderbeg, caused a debate in Albania. A Swiss national daily newspaper Tages-Anzeiger published Schmitt's interview given to Enver Robelli in Tirana on 25 February 2009, in which it is emphasized that Schmitt claims that Skanderbeg's mother Voisava was Serbian, a member of the Branković family and that the Kastrioti surname probably is derived from Greek word kastron (fort). He was accused of committing sacrilege and sullying the Albanian national honor. Ardian Klosi, who translated his book from German to Albanian, was accused of treason. Schmitt, in response to critics, said that he had never claimed Skanderbeg was Serbian and furthermore states that he considers him to have been an Albanian.

=== Bibliography ===
- Das venezianische Albanien (1392–1479), Munich: R. Oldenbourg Verlag, 2001, ISBN 3-486-56569-9
- "Skanderbegs letzte Jahre. West-östliches Wechselspiel von Diplomatie und Krieg im Zeitalter der osmanischen Eroberung Albaniens (1464–1468)", Südost-Forschung 62 (2004/2005): 56–123.
- Levantiner. Lebenswelten und Identitäten einer ethnokonfessionellen Gemeinschaft im osmanischen Reich im "langen 19. Jahrhundert", Munich: R. Oldenbourg Verlag, 2005.
- "Die Ägäis als Kommunikationsraum im späten Mittelalter", Saeculum 56 (2005): 215–225.
- "Les Levantins, les Européens et le jeu d'identités", Smyrne, la ville oubliée? : Mémoires d'un grand port ottoman, 1830–1930, ed. Marie-Carmen Smyrnelis, Paris: Autrement, 2006. 106–119.
- "Venezianische Horizonte der Geschichte Südosteuropas", Südost-Forschungen 65/66 (2006-2007): 87–116.
- "Skanderbeg reitet wieder: Wiederfindung und Erfindung eines (National-)Helden im balkanischen und gesamteuropäischen Kontext (15.–21. Jh.)", Schnittstellen. Gesellschaft, Nation, Konflikt und Erinnerung in Südosteuropa: Festschrift für Holm Sundhausen zum 65. Geburtstag, eds. Ulf Brunnbauer, Andreas Helmedach & Stefan Troebst, Munich: R. Oldenbourg Verlag, 2007. 401–419.
- "'Flucht aus dem Orient'? Kulturelle Orientierung und Identitäten im albanischsprachigen Balkan", Stabilität in Südosteuropa – eine Herausforderung für die Informationsvermittlung, ed. F. Görner, Berlin: 2008. 12–27.
- "Des melons pour la cour du Sancakbeg: Split et son arrière-pays ottoman à travers les registres de compte de l'administration vénitienne dans les années 1570", Living in the Ottoman Ecumenical Community: Essays in Honour of Suraiya Faroqhi, eds. V. Costantini & M. Koller, Leiden-Boston: Brill, 2008. 437–452.
- Kosovo: kurze Geschichte einer zentralbalkanischen Landschaft (in German), Vienna: Böhlau Verlag, 2008, ISBN 978-3-8252-3156-9.
- Skanderbeg: Der neue Alexander auf dem Balkan (PDF), Regensburg: Verlag Friedrich Pustet, 2009, ISBN 978-3-7917-2229-0, archived from the original (PDF) on 7 July 2011.
- Die Albaner: Eine Geschichte zwischen Orient und Okzident. (in German), Munich: C.H. Beck, 2012, ISBN 9783406630323, OCLC 785811669.
- Căpitan Codreanu: Aufstieg und Fall des rumänischen Faschistenführers. Vienna: Paul Zsolnay Verlag, 2016.
- Der Balkan im 20. Jahrhundert: Eine postimperiale Geschichte (in German), Stuttgart: Kohlhammer Verlag, 2019, ISBN 978-3-17-031860-1.
- A Concise History of Albania, Cambridge University Press, 2022, ISBN 9781009254908
- Moskaus westliche Rivalen. Eine europäische Geschichte vom Nordkap bis zum Schwarzen Meer. Klett-Cotta, 2025, ISBN 978-3-608-96618-3.

Edited volumes

- with Michael Metzeltin, Das Südosteuropa der Regionen. Vienna: Verlag der Österreichischen Akademie der Wissenschaften, 2015.
- The Ottoman Conquest of the Balkans: Interpretations and Research Debates. Vienna: Verlag der Österreichischen Akademie der Wissenschaften, 2016.
