= Anadolu Sigorta =

Anadolu Anonim Türk Sigorta Şirketi
- Company type: Anonim Şirket
- Traded as: BİST: ANSGR
- Industry: Financial services
- Founded: 1925; 101 years ago
- Headquarters: Rüzgarlıbahçe Mahallesi, Çam Pınarı Sok, No:6, 34805 Kavacık Istanbul
- Area served: Turkey; Northern Cyprus
- Key people: Füsun Tümsavaş (Chairman); Z. Mehmet Tuğtan (CEO)
- Products: Non-Life Insurance
- Revenue: $1.5 billion (2023)
- Owner: Milli Reasürans T.A.Ş. (57.3%)
- Number of employees: 1200
- Website: www.anadolusigorta.com.tr

Anadolu Anonim Türk Sigorta Şirketi (Anadolu Insurance Company), established on April 1, 1925, by Mustafa Kemal Atatürk, was the first national insurance company of Turkey. It remains one of the largest insurance companies in the country.

== History ==
Anadolu Sigorta was founded on April 1, 1925, at the initiative of Gazi Mustafa Kemal and under the leadership of İşbank, Turkey's first national bank.

Blue Insurance policies marking the introduction of comprehensive insurance system in Turkey and offering 17 types of cover were put on sale for the first time in 1983. The following year, highly acclaimed in by the public and the sector, "Insurance of the Future", the most comprehensive life policy ever offered in Turkey, was introduced. In 1986, representing a new branch in the Turkish insurance business, "Electronic Equipment Insurance" was first started by Anadolu Sigorta.

In 1991, Anadolu Sigorta transferred its life insurance branch to Anadolu Hayat Sigorta Şirketi, a newly-formed life insurer as required by law. In 1993, the company extended administrative and technical assistance to Günay Anadolu Sigorta which founded and started to operate in Azerbaijan, and became the first Turkish insurance company to set up an international operation. Policies in legal protection insurance branch, another first in Turkey, were written by the company in 1996. The next year, aiming to make the most of the possibilities offered by IT, Anadolu Sigorta launched a "Recon Project". Services were made more efficient and productive with the inclusion of all services and agencies in the data processing network with online and real-time systems.

In order to provide the fastest and most comprehensive service to its policyholders in the aftermath of the disastrous earthquake on August 17, 1999, the Company worked round the clock to provide uninterrupted service.

In 2004, the company expanded its service range by taking over the health branch from Anadolu Hayat Emeklilik, which the law required that company to give up. Anadolu Sigorta was awarded its ISO 9001:2000 Quality Management System certification, an endorsement proving that the company's quality management system complies with international standards.

Anadolu Sigorta celebrated its 85th anniversary in 2010 and launched its new social responsibility project, “Bir Usta Bin Usta” (From One Master to One Thousand), which aimed to contribute towards to revitalizing vanishing professions in Anatolia. The following year, The company moved its headquarters to Kavacık, and continues to offer its services at nine regional branches in Turkey, (Adana, İzmir, Bursa, Ankara, Samsun, Trabzon, Antalya, Kadıköy, Istanbul and Beşiktaş, Istanbul) and TRNC branch.

== See also ==
- İşbank
