= Cengiz Bektaş =

Turkish architect (1934–2020)

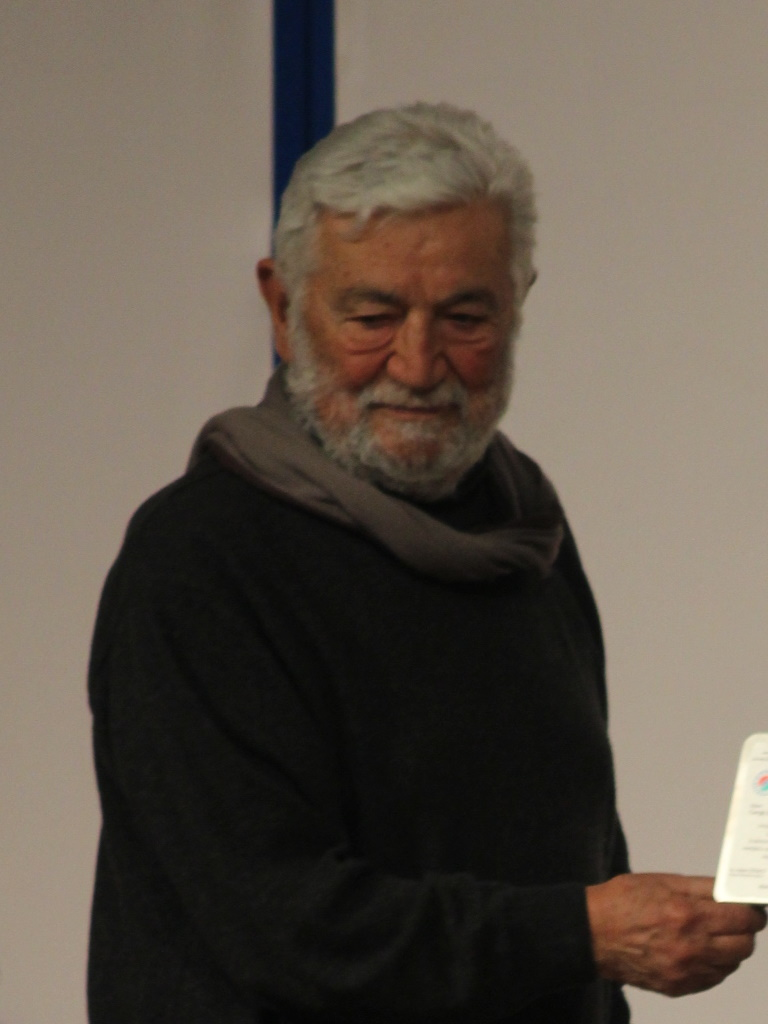
- Bektaş at Turgut Cansever Architectural Awards in Antalya, 2019.
- Born: 26 November 1934; Denizli, Turkey
- Died: 20 March 2020 (aged 85); Istanbul, Turkey
- Occupations: Architect, poet, engineer, writer
- Buildings: Etimesgut Mosque, Ankara; Babadağlılar Bazaar, Denizli; Turkish Language Association, Ankara; Kantogan House, Datça; Akdeniz University Olbia Social Center, Antalya

Cengiz Bektaş (26 November 1934 – 20 March 2020) was a Turkish architect, engineer, poet and writer for Evrensel newspaper.

== Education ==
Bektaş was born in Denizli. He attended the State Academy of the Fine Arts in Istanbul and took part as a student in Kurt Erdmann's 1955 field trip to study Islamic architecture in Anatolia. He graduated in architecture in 1959 while also attending the Technical University of Munich. He taught at various other universities in both Germany and Turkey, notably Middle East Technical University.

== Professional career ==
Bektaş spent his time between the years of '59 to '62 working as a freelance architect in Munich. In 1962, however, he was requested by Middle East Technical University in Ankara to work as a teacher, which he accepted. He went on to work there for a while, after leaving voluntarily to embark on other opportunities.

Since 1963, Bektaş has been working at his own workplace and has also been giving lectures at universities.

== Projects ==
- Etimesgut Mosque, Ankara (1964)
- Babadağlılar Bazaar, Denizli (1973)
- Turkish Language Association, Ankara (1974)
- Kantogan House, Datça (1977)
- Mertim skyscraper, Mersin (1987)
- Library in the Hakiç, Istanbul (1988)
- Dr. Atalay Tunçdemir House, Bartın (1988)
- Bakırköy International Industrial Bank, Istanbul (1988)
- Ayfer Yağcı Bazaar, Balıkesir (1989)
- Library/Esin Aksoy House, Istanbul (1989)
- Büyükada Turkish-Swedish Cultural House, Istanbul (1989)
- Fe-Farma Medical Supplies Factory, Elazığ (1990)
- Akdeniz University Olbia Social Center, Antalya (1999) – awarded by Aga Khan
- Akdeniz University Meltem entrance – dismantled in 2019
- Aphrodisias Oct Museum, Aydın (2007)

== Awards received ==
- T.C. Bonn Embassy, 1st Prize 1963
- T.C. Lisbon Embassy, 3rd Prize 1963
- T.C. Bonn Embassy Building Competition, 1st Prize, 1963
- General Directorate of Turkey Halkbank, Mention 5, 1965
- SSK İzmir Konak Facility Competition, 3rd Prize, 1966
- Cultural Park in Antakya Architectural Design Competition, 1st Mention, 1967
- Bakırköy Elderly Site, 1st Prize, 1968
- TC Vakıflar Bank TAO General Directorate, 3rd Mention, 1972
- Edirne Kapıkule Customs Border Crossing Facilities Architectural Design Competition, 3rd Prize, 1971

== Books ==
- Halk Yapı Sanatı, 2001 (Public Buildings Art)
- Barış Sofrası, 2001 (Peace Supper)
- Selçuklu Kervansarayları, 1999 (The Seljuk Caravanserai)
- Konutlar Villalar / Toplukonut ve Siteler / Yenileme Çalışmaları Yapı'dan Seçmeler 1, 1999 (Residential Villas / Toplukonut and Sites / Renovation Work Building Selections from the first)
- Kentli Olmak ya da Olmamak, 1999 (Urban or Not To Be)
- Akdenizli Ozanlar, 1999 (Poets Mediterranean)
- Bak Bak Desinler, 1998 (Let Look, They Say)
- Türk Evi, 1996 (Turkish House)
- Yaşama Kültürü, 1996 (Culture of Living)
- Ev Alma Komşu Al, 1996 (Not Buy Home, You Obtain Adjacent)
- Hoşgörünün Öteki Adı: Kuzguncuk, 1996 (Another Name of Tolerance:Kuzguncuk)
- Kent, 1996 (Urban)
- Kültür Kirlenmesi, 1996 (Culture Pollution)
- Kuş Evleri, 1994 (Houses of Bird)
- Koruma Onarım, 1993 (Protection Repair)
- Babadağ Evleri, 1987 (Babadağ Houses)
- Şirinköy Evleri, 1987 (Şirinköy Houses)
- Kimin Bu Sokaklar, Alanlar, Kentler?, 1987 (Whose These Streets, Areas, Cities?)
- Kuşadası Evleri, 1987 (Kuşadası Houses)
- Akşehir Evleri, 1987 (Akşehir Houses)
- Yuva mı Mal mı?, 1983 (Is Nest or Property)
- Duvarların Dışı da Senin, 1982 (Outside of The Walls in Your)
- Benim Oğlum Bina Okur, 1980 (My Son Study Building)
- Halk Yapı Sanatından Bir Örnek: Bodrum, 1977 (Public Buildings Art An Example from: Bodrum)
- Mimarlıkta Eleştiri, 1967 (Criticism in Architecture)

== Appearances ==
- Kepirtepe Architecture Summer School (Summer School, 2009)
- National Convention of Architects by IIA at Bangalore, India (NATCON 2008) - as a Key Speaker presented Talk "Traditions extended"
- Architecture and the City Festival-1: "Cities, Coasts ..." (Festival, 2005)
- Young / business / L 3: Workshop on Architecture Students (Workshop, 2004)
- 1st Istanbul Architecture Festival (Festival, 2004)
- Star Gathering 2004 – Project Platform (Meeting, 2004)
- Cengiz Bektas: Added to Tradition (Interview, 2004)
- Discuss Architects: Building Making Art (Talk, 2004)
- Making Buildings Art II (Panel, 2004)
- Dolphins Aran Conference: Traditions Added (Conference, 2004)
- Find the Cultural Heritage Evaluation Meeting I (Meeting, 2004)
- Arkitera Platform 14 (Meetings, 2003)
- Dialogue Arkitera 2002 – Cengiz Bektas (Talk, 2002)
- Urban Conservation and Renewal (Panel, 2000)
- Beşiktaş-Samatia Road Project (Panel, 1991)
