= Isbank Tower 1 =

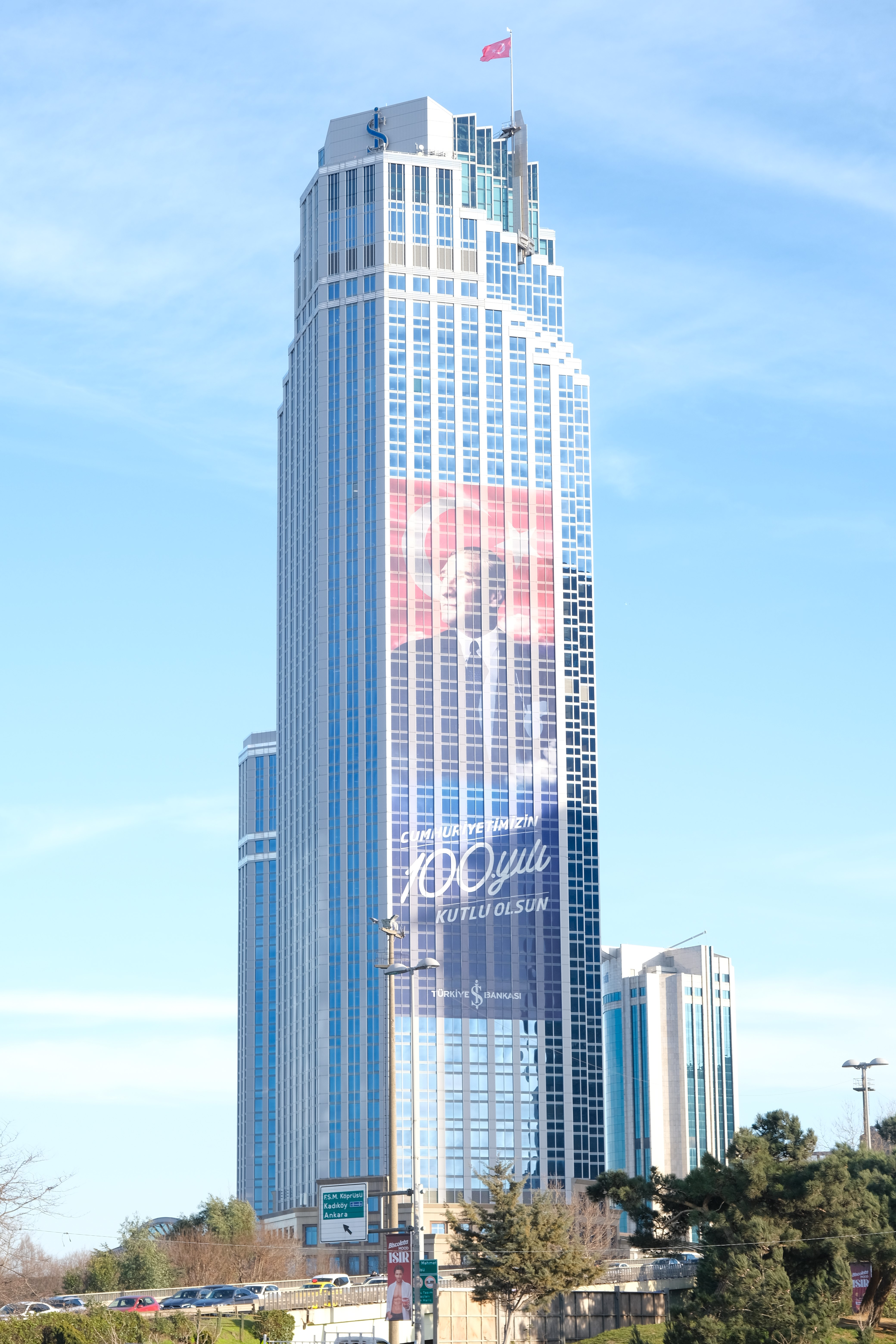

General information
- Status: Completed
- Type: Mixed-use
- Location: Büyükdere Avenue, Levent, Istanbul, Turkey
- Coordinates: 41.0828°N 29.0114°E
- Construction started: 1996
- Opening: 2000
- Cost: US$230,000,000

Height
- Tip: 194 m (636 ft)
- Roof: 181 m (594 ft)

Technical details
- Floor count: 52

Design and construction
- Architects: Swanke Hayden Connell Architects; Tekeli-Sisa
- Developer: Türkiye İş Bankası

The 52-floor Isbank (İş Bankası) Tower 1 is the tallest of the three skyscrapers of the Türkiye İş Bankası headquarters in Levent, Istanbul. It was formerly the tallest skyscraper in Turkey and the Balkans (southeastern Europe). It entered service with the ceremonies between August 23 and 26, 2000.

== Specifications of the building ==
- Its official height is 181.20 m (594.5 ft) without the flag pole, and 194.57 m (638.4 ft) including the flag pole.
- Uses "intelligent skyscraper" technologies.
- Located close to the Levent subway station of the Istanbul Metro on Büyükdere Avenue.
- Owned and built by Türkiye İş Bankası (Turkish Business Bank).
- Several details of the building resemble Trump Tower in New York City, which was designed by the same architect firm, Swanke Hayden Connell Architects. SHCA collaborated with the Turkish architect firm Tekeli-Sisa.
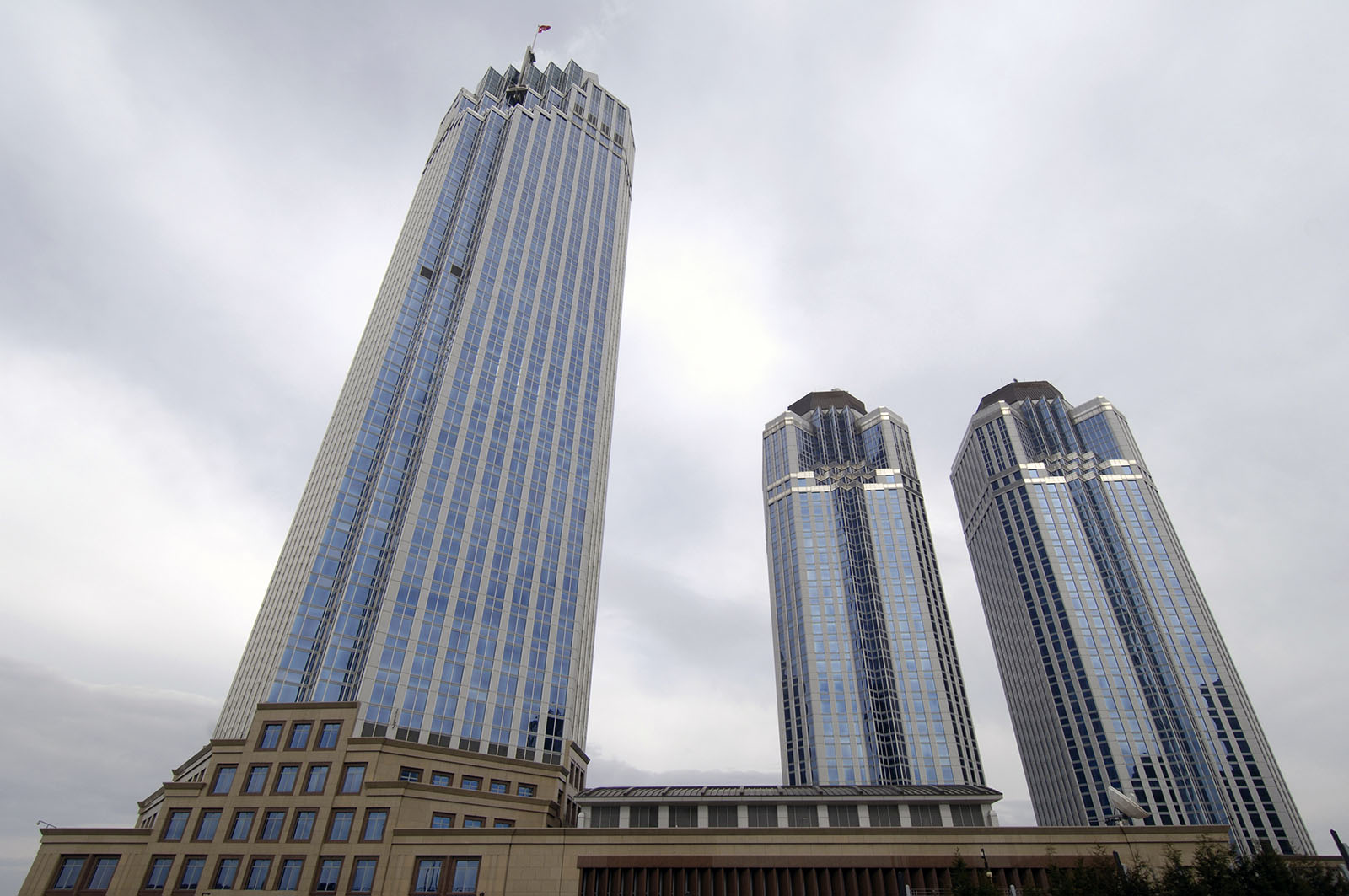
Iş Bank buildings as group

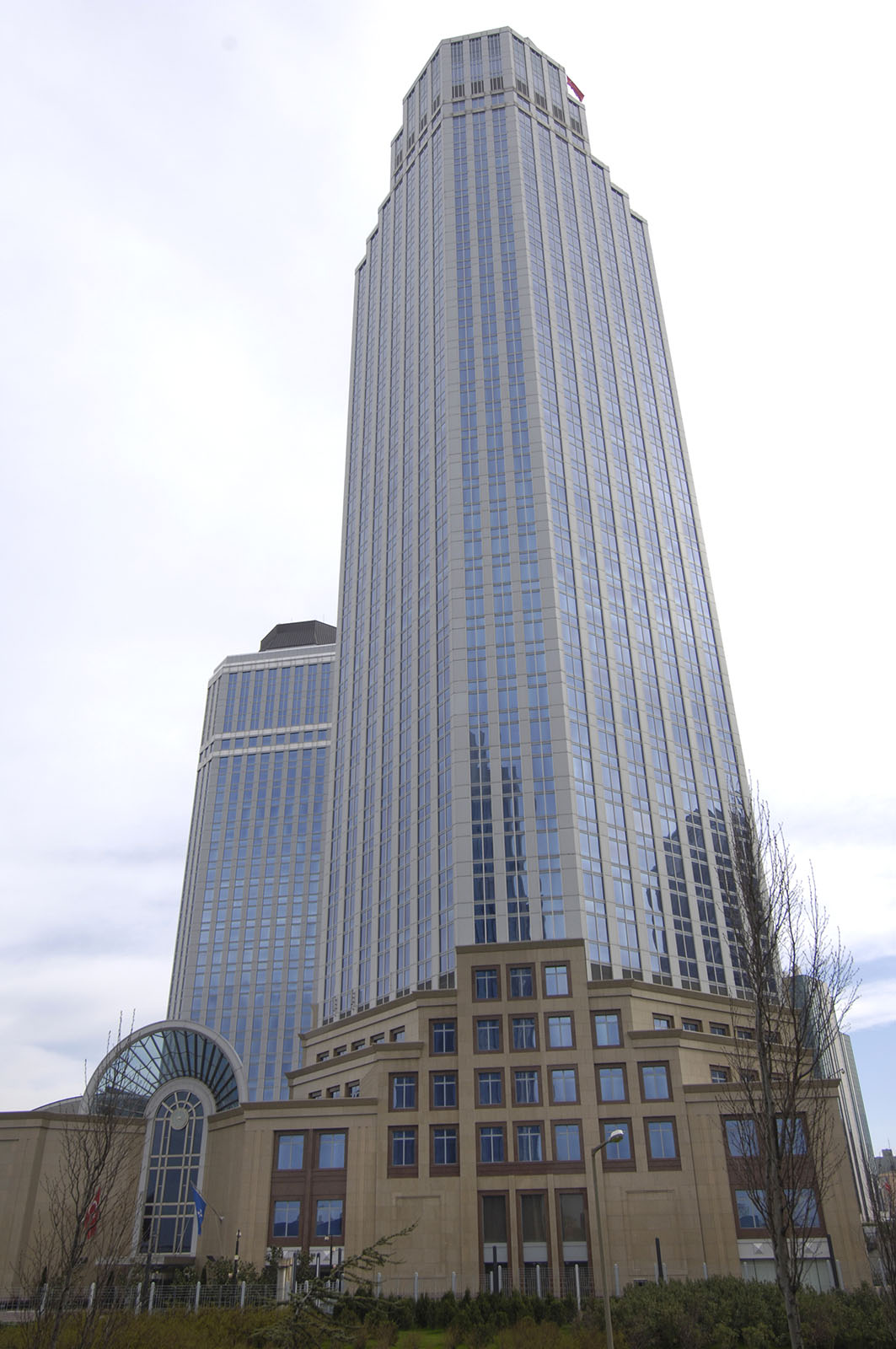
Iş Bank buildings

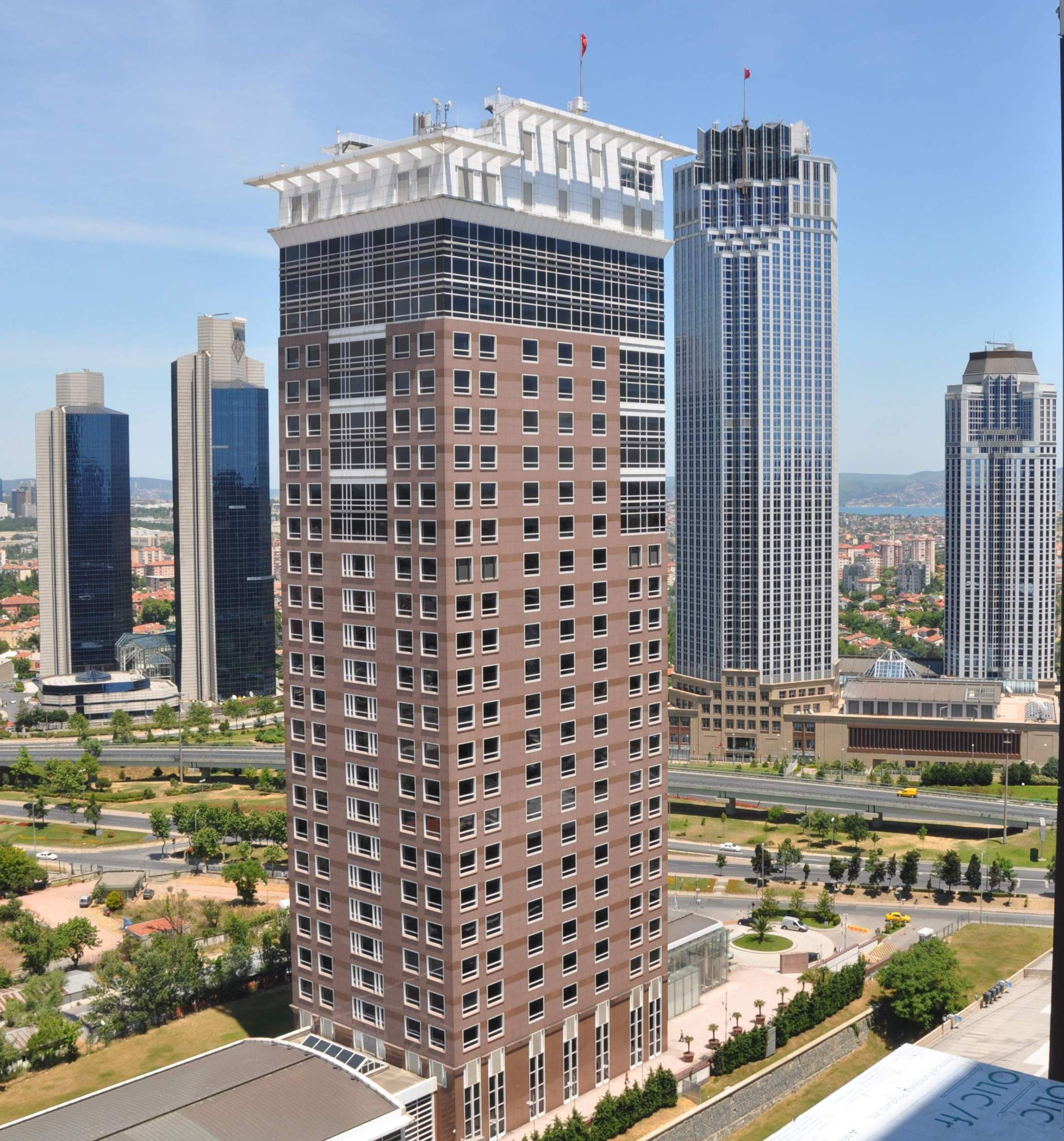
Tekfen Tower in Levent, with the Sabancı Center towers at left and Isbank Towers 1 and 2 at right.

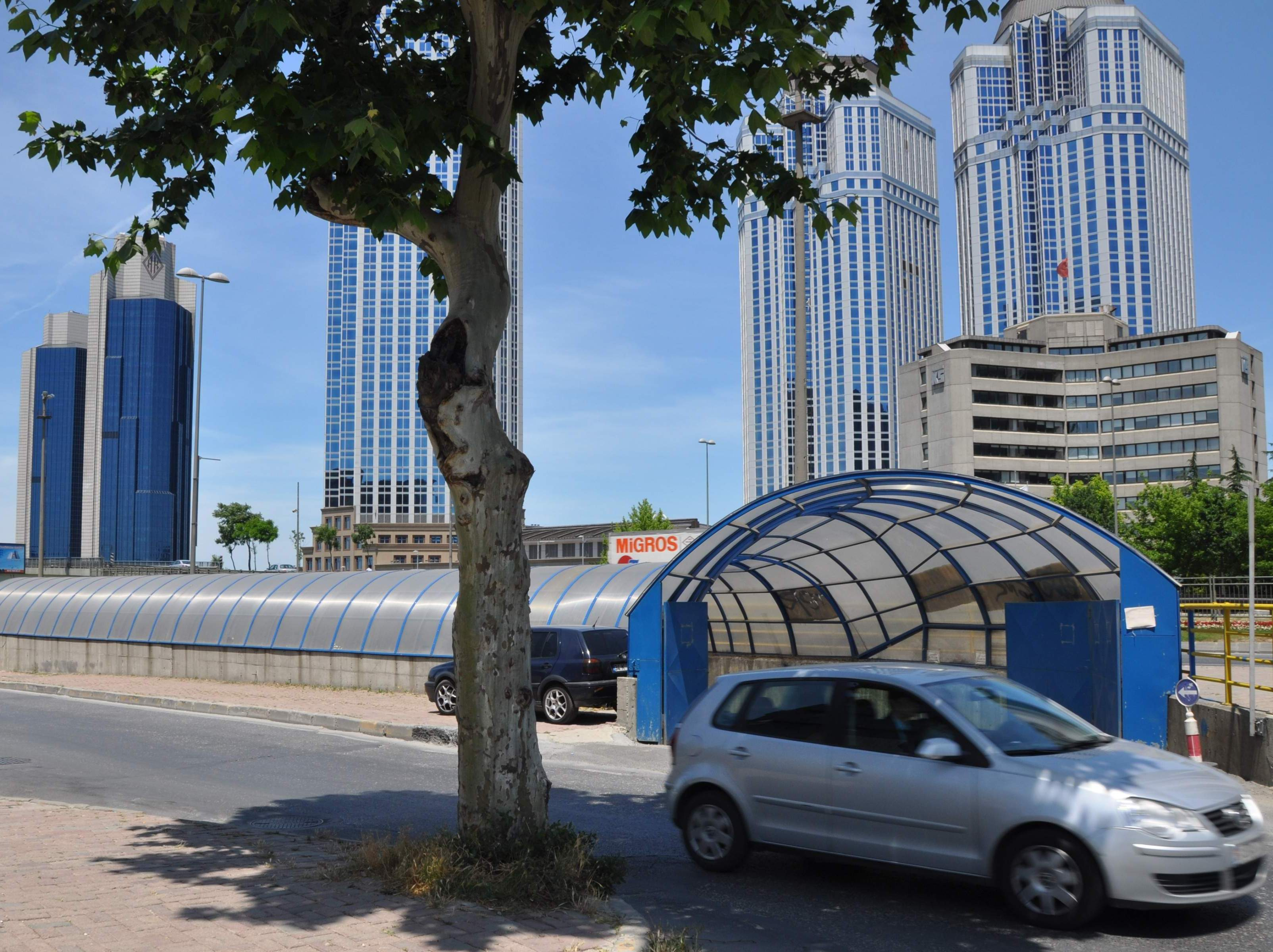
Sabancı Center towers at left, and Isbank Towers 1, 2 and 3 at right.

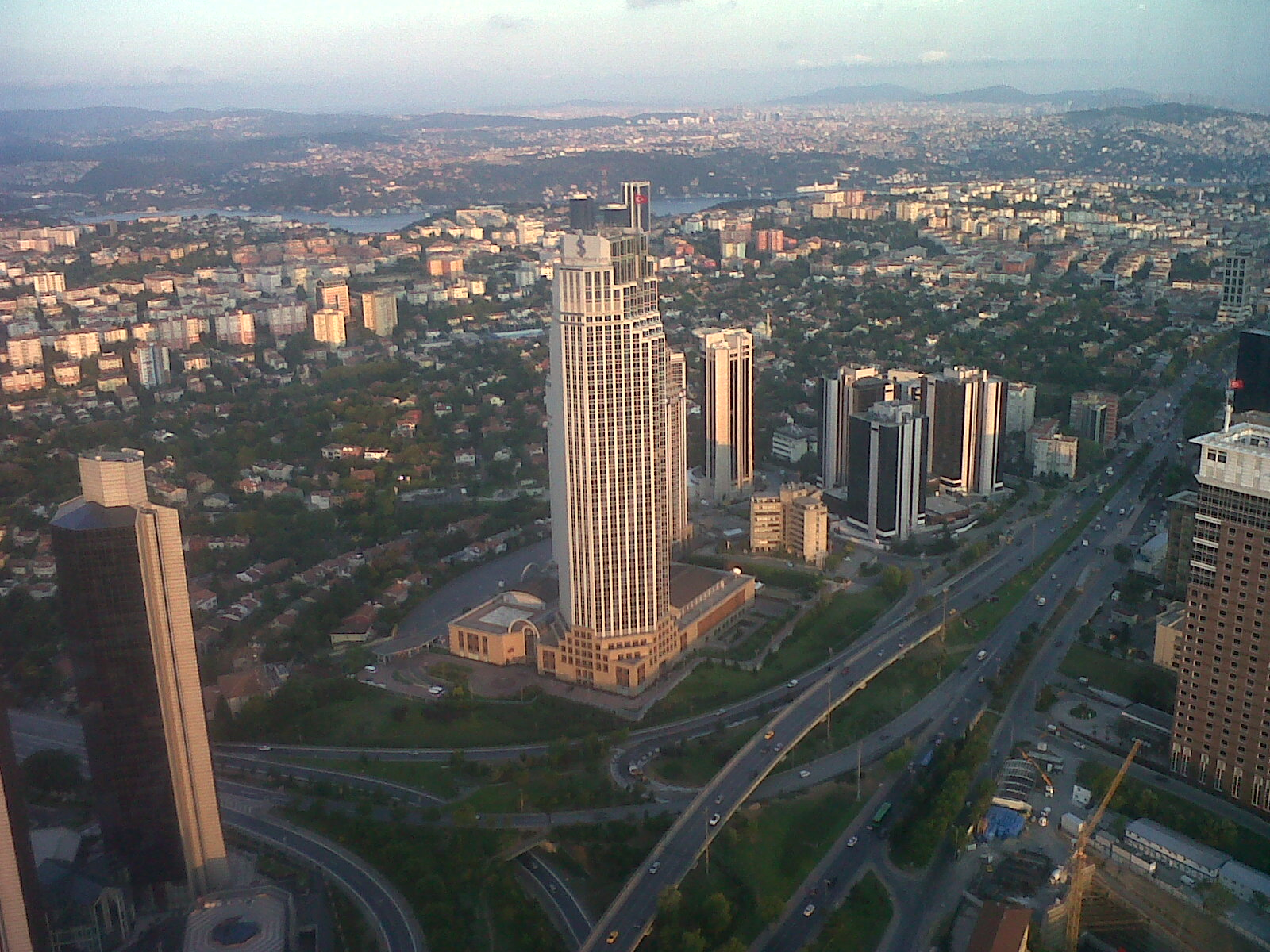
View of the Türkiye İş Bankası headquarters from Istanbul Sapphire.

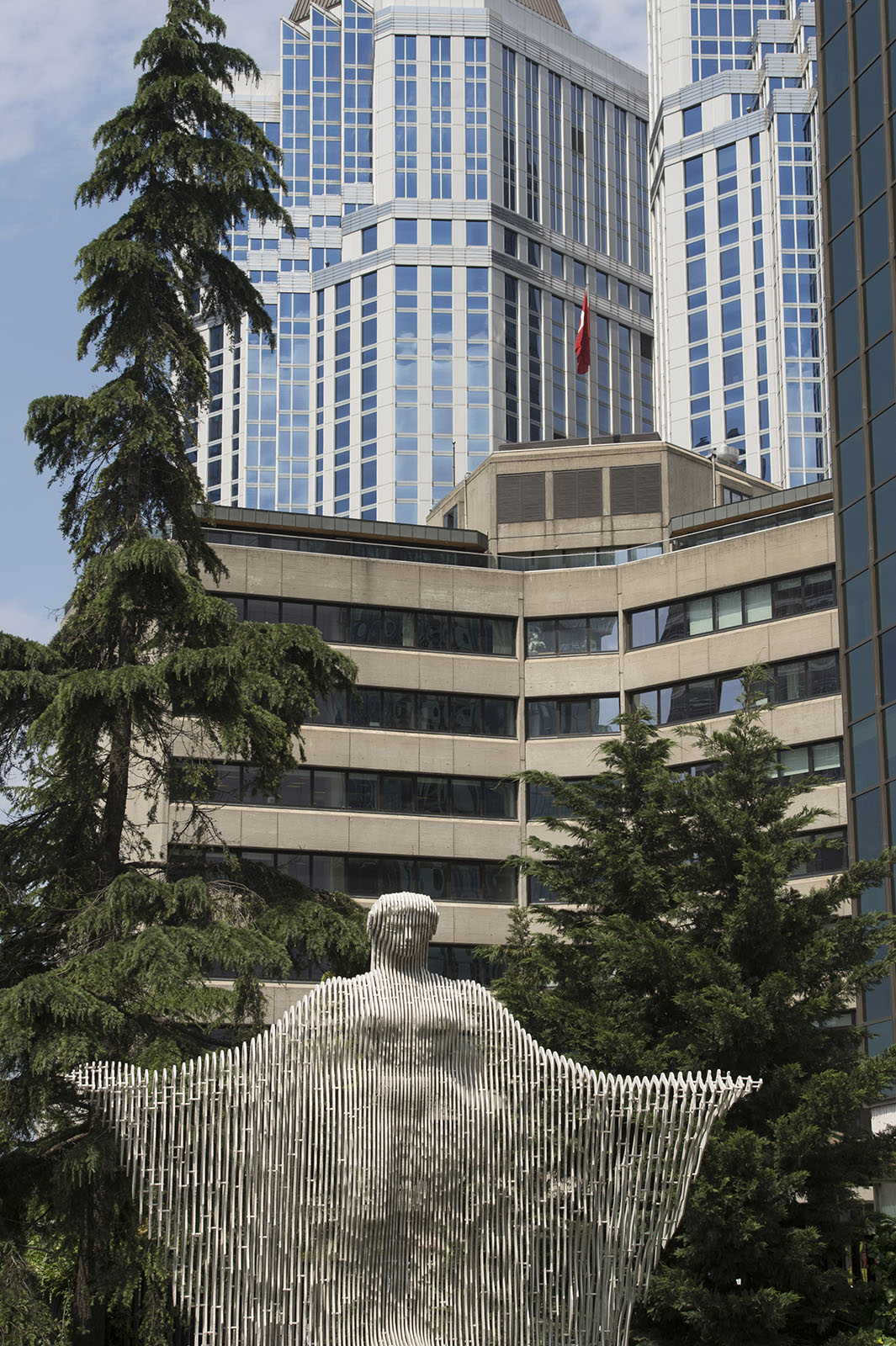
Iş Bank buildings Lower floors

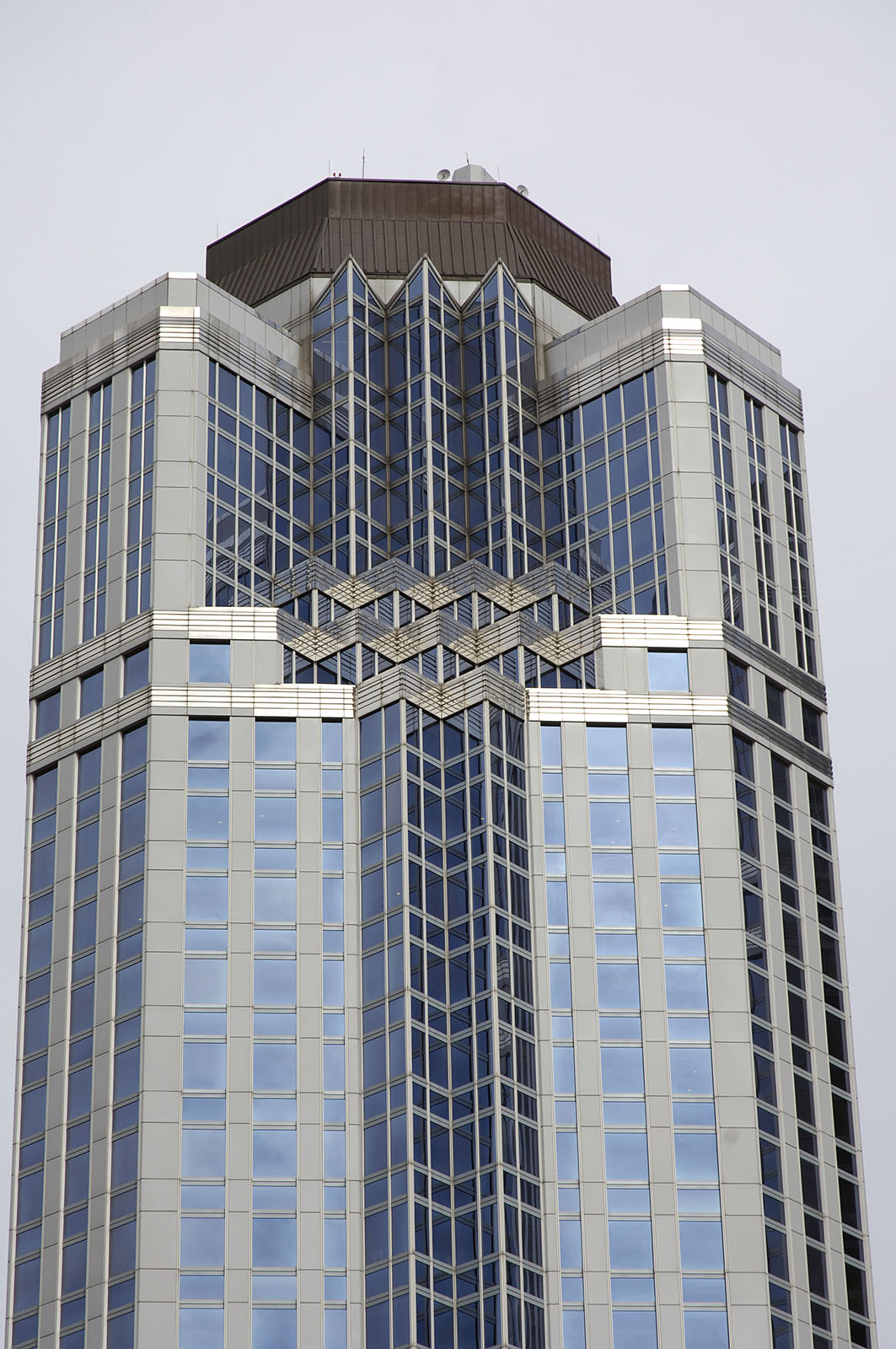
Iş Bank buildings Top floors

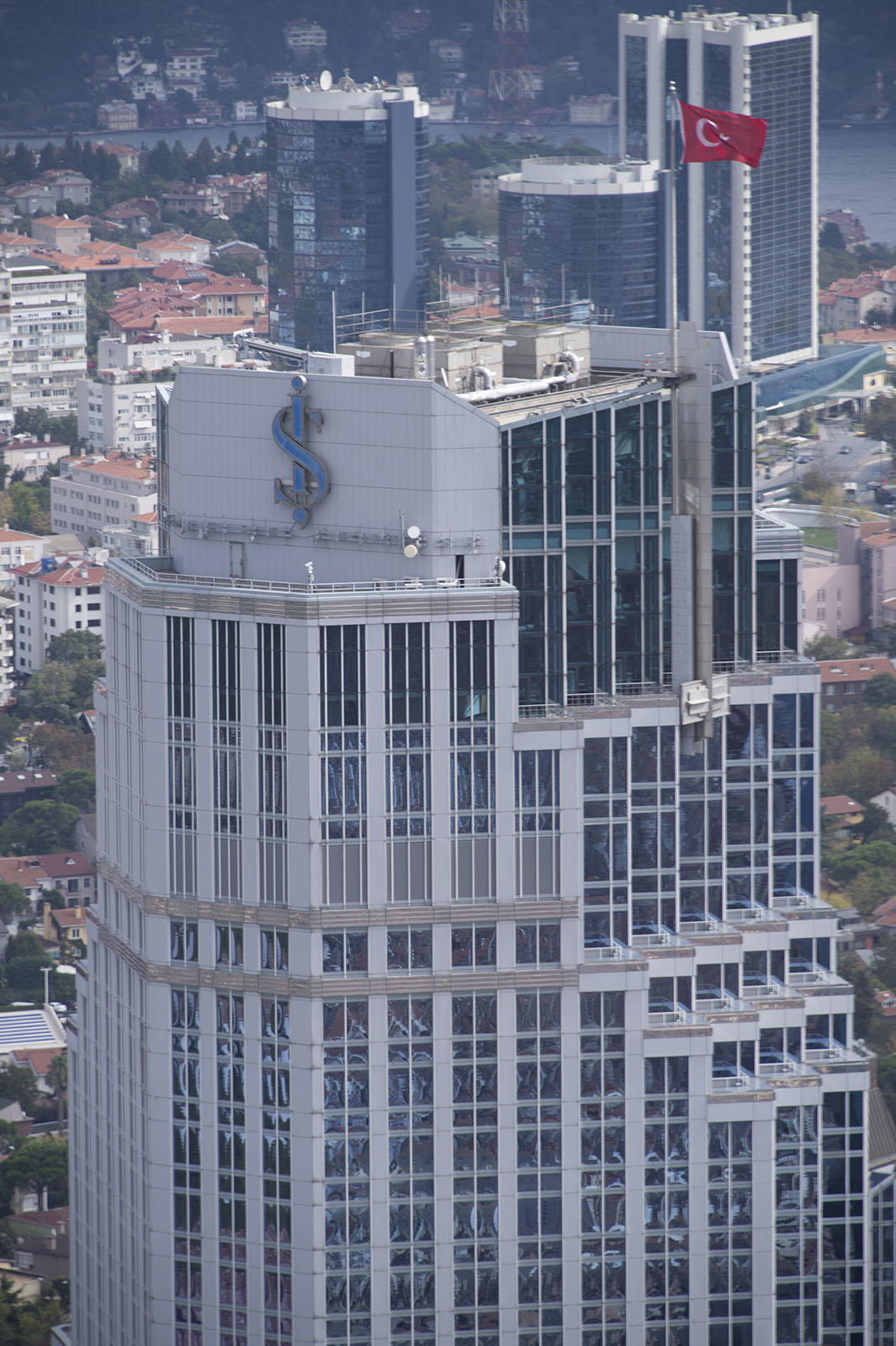
Iş Bank buildings Top floors from Istanbul Sapphire

100th aniversary light show

== See also ==
- Istanbul
- List of tallest buildings in Istanbul
- List of tallest buildings in Turkey
- List of tallest buildings in Europe

Records
Preceded by Mertim	Tallest Building in Turkey; 2000—2010; 181 m	Succeeded by Istanbul Sapphire
Preceded by Akbank Tower	Tallest Building in Istanbul; 2000—2010; 181 m	Succeeded by Istanbul Sapphire
