= Mertim =

Tower in Mersin, Turkey

Mertim Tower
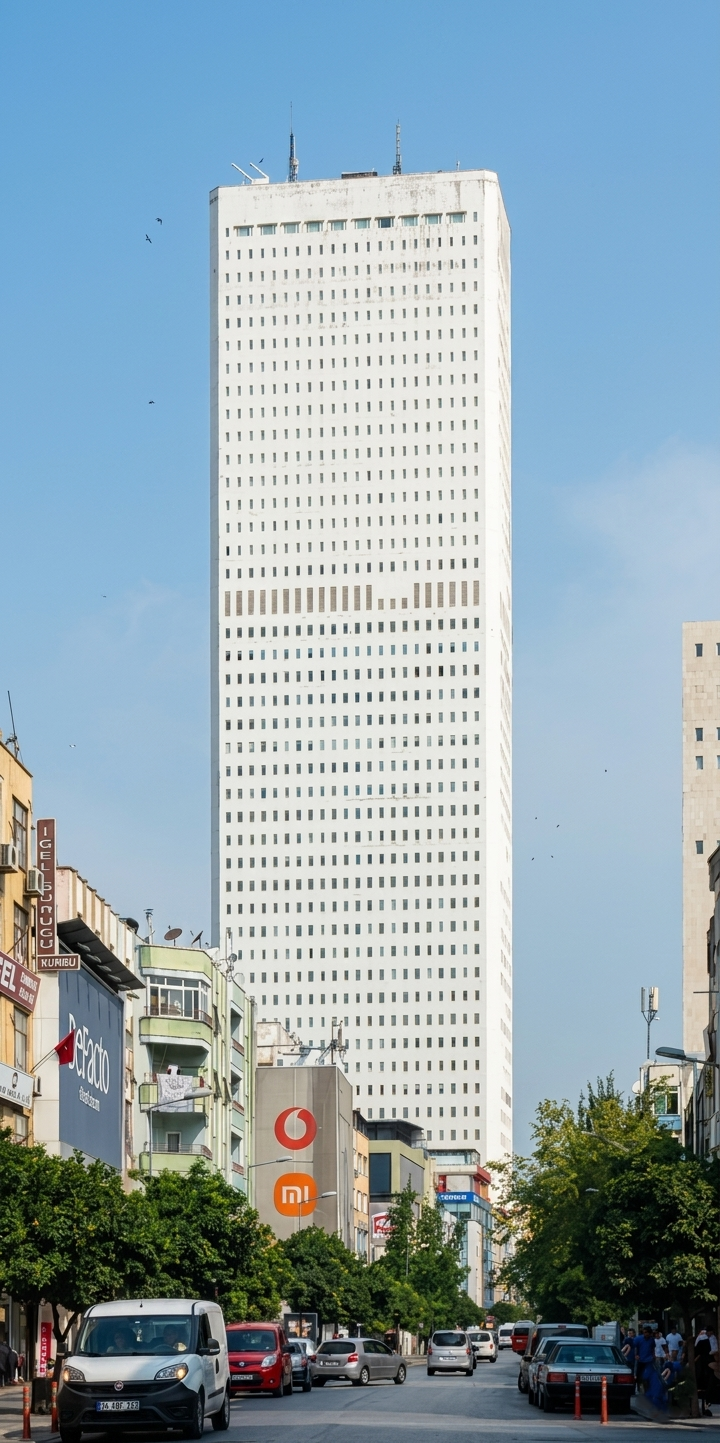
- Interactive map of the Mertim Tower area

General information
- Status: Completed
- Type: Business
- Location: Mersin, Turkey
- Construction started: 1987
- Topped-out: 1990
- Opening: 1992

Height
- Height: 176,8

Technical details
- Floor count: 52

Mertim, an acronym for Mersin Ticaret Merkezi (Mersin Trade Center), is a 176.8 m (580 ft), 52-floor skyscraper in Mersin, Turkey. It was the tallest building in Turkey between 1990 and 2000, until the completion of the 181.2 m (594 ft), 52-floor Isbank Tower 1 in Levent, Istanbul. Mertim Tower in Mersin is also the tallest hotel building in Turkey.

== History ==
The Port of Mersin, which is the largest seaport in Turkey and the main port for international trade with the Turkish Republic of Northern Cyprus, had been declared as a free trade zone and a series of buildings were constructed in the city to be used in business and commerce, which included the Mertim Tower.

== The construction ==
The architect of the complex was Cengiz Bektaş who designed the building in 1985. The tower was constructed during the second half of the 1980s by the Üstay Corporation.The tower was topped out in 1990 and the entire complex entered service in 1992. Immediately after its opening in 1992, a part of the building was used by the University of Mersin for several years during the 1990s.

== Building ==
The complex at 36°48′N 34°37′E includes a shopping center of 1100 stores and a 52-floor skyscraper which is popularly known as Metropol or the Tower. The total height of the building above ground level is 176.8 metres (580 ft) and it is claimed that it was the tallest skyscraper in the area between Singapore and Frankfurt as of the early 1990s. Sixteen floors of the building are used as a hotel and the rest are reserved for offices. At present, the hotel is operated by the Radisson Hotel Group.

Records
Preceded by Banking Regulation and Supervision Council	Tallest Building in Turkey; 1987—2000; 171 m	Succeeded by İşbank Tower 1
Preceded by Unknown	Tallest Building in Mersin; 1987—Present; 177 m	Succeeded by None
