= Anadolu Hayat Emeklilik =

Anadolu Hayat Emeklilik A.Ş.
- Type: Anonim Şirket
- Traded as: BİST: ANHYT
- Industry: Financial services
- Founded: 1990; 36 years ago
- Headquarters: Turkey
- Area served: Turkey
- Key people: Yalçın Sezen (Chairman); Yılmaz Ertürk (CEO)
- Products: Private pensions and life insurance
- Total assets: ▲USD 7.093 billion (2023)
- Owner: İş Bankası (64.9%) Anadolu Sigorta (20%)
- Website: www.anadoluhayat.com.tr

Anadolu Hayat Emeklilik A.Ş. ("Anadolu Life Insurance and Pensions") is the oldest life insurance company of Turkey and remains one of the largest in the country. A subsidiary of İş Bankası, Anadolu Hayat Emeklilik is the first publicly traded private pensions company in Turkey. Founded in 1990 to take over the life insurance activities of Anadolu Sigorta following new legislation Anadolu Hayat Sigorta was transformed into a private pension company in 2003 under the new name Anadolu Hayat Emeklilik A.Ş.

== Business and activities ==
Anadolu Hayat Emeklilik provides private pension and insurance products that suit to the future expectations and current conditions of customers via districts sales offices in İstanbul (3), Ankara (2), Adana, Bursa, İzmir, Kocaeli, Antalya and Trabzon, a branch office in the Turkish Republic of Northern Cyprus besides its head office in İstanbul. Anadolu Hayat Emeklilik commands a widespread service organization with its bancasurrance network, direct sales force and nationwide agencies.

== See also ==
- İşbank
