= İşbank =

Commercial bank in Turkey

Türkiye İş Bankası A.Ş.

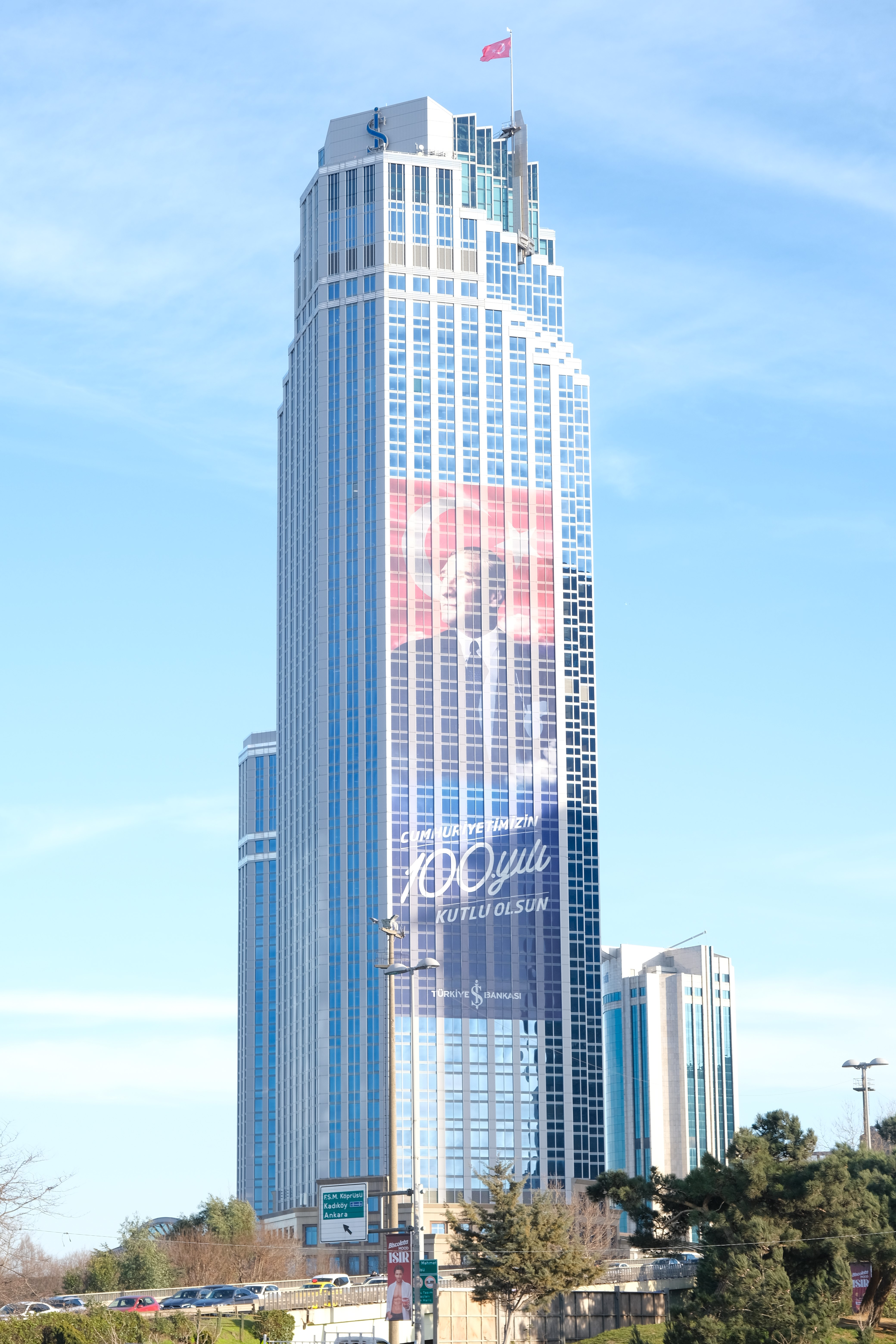
- İşbank Tower in Levent, İstanbul
- Type: Anonim Şirket
- Traded as: BİST: ISATR; BİST: ISBTR; BİST: ISCTR; LSE: TIBD
- Industry: Finance and insurance
- Founded: August 26, 1924; 101 years ago
- Founder: Mustafa Kemal Atatürk
- Headquarters: İşbank Towers, Levent, Istanbul, Turkey
- Number of locations: 1,195 branches (1,174 domestic; 21 abroad) (2021)
- Area served: Worldwide
- Key people: Adnan Bali (Chairman); Hakan Aran (CEO)
- Products: Financial services, credit cards, consumer banking, corporate banking, investment banking, mortgage loans, private banking
- Revenue: ▲US$18.27 billion (2024)
- Operating income: ▲US$1.88 billion (2024)
- Net income: ▲US$1.94 billion (2024)
- Total assets: ▲US$111.88 billion(2024)
- Total equity: ▲US$10.80 billion (2024)
- Number of employees: 21,167 (2023)
- Subsidiaries: 109 subsidiaries, including List: Anadolu Sigorta Anadolu Hayat Emeklilik Maximum Kart Milli Re Şişecam Privia Maximiles İş Yatırım İş Leasing İş Factoring Camİş İşnet Softtech Türkiye İş Bankası Kültür Yayınları
- Rating: S&P: unknown Moody's: B1; Fitch: BB-
- Website: www.isbank.com.tr/en

İşbank, officially Türkiye İş Bankası, (Note: English: Business Bank of Türkiye) is a commercial bank in Turkey. Founded by the orders of Mustafa Kemal Atatürk in 1924, it is the first bank to go into operation in the Republic of Türkiye.

As of a late 2023 report, the bank operates with 1,066 branches domestically, giving it one of the largest branch networks in Turkey. İşbank also has 22 branches across 11 countries. The bank provides services to 24.3 million customers as of 2023.

== History ==
Following the culmination of World War I in 1918 and the subsequent dissolution of the Ottoman Empire in 1922, Turkey was declared a republic with Mustafa Kemal Atatürk as the president. Atatürk acknowledged the government’s need for a national financial institution to rebuild Turkey's economy following the debacle of the war. İşbank was founded on 26 August 1924 at the First Economy Congress in İzmir.

Atatürk appointed Celâl Bayar, his close aide and then the Minister of Exchange Construction and Settlement, as the president of the newly formed bank. İşbank began operations with two branches and 37 staff under the leadership of Celâl Bayar, its first general manager. The bank was established with a capital of 1,000,000 TL of which 250,000 TL was covered by Atatürk himself, and the rest by private investors. In 1927, the capital was raised by 2 Million TL so it could be merged with the National Credit Bank as equal partners.

Established to utilize the smallest savings and transfer them to development, İşbank played a major role in the establishment and development of savings awareness in Turkish society, bringing the first piggy banks to Turkey in 1928. In the following years, İşbank began to expand by opening branches across the country. In 1932, İşbank opened branches in Hamburg, Germany and Alexandria, Egypt, becoming the first Turkish bank to open branches abroad. In the 1950s, İşbank expanded its portfolio of subsidiaries. The bank's subsidiaries became the driving force of Turkish industry, investing in and financing a wide range of businesses, particularly in the manufacturing sector. Having accelerated branch expansion in the 1960s and 1970s, İşbank paid special attention to the development of its overseas branch network in the 1980s. In the 1980s, İşbank began to offer a wide range of services to its customers in line with its multichannel banking vision. In 1982, İşbank introduced the first Automated Teller Machines (ATM) to Turkey, and at the same time, the bank named its ATMs as "Bankamatik" and registered this name as a trademark. With the launch of the "Blue Line" in 1991 and the first internet branch in 1997, İşbank assumed a pioneering role in this field. Since those years, İşbank has been carrying out R&D activities and studies on the use of new technologies to increase the quality and diversity of its services in line with the wishes and expectations of its customers.

== Financial operations ==
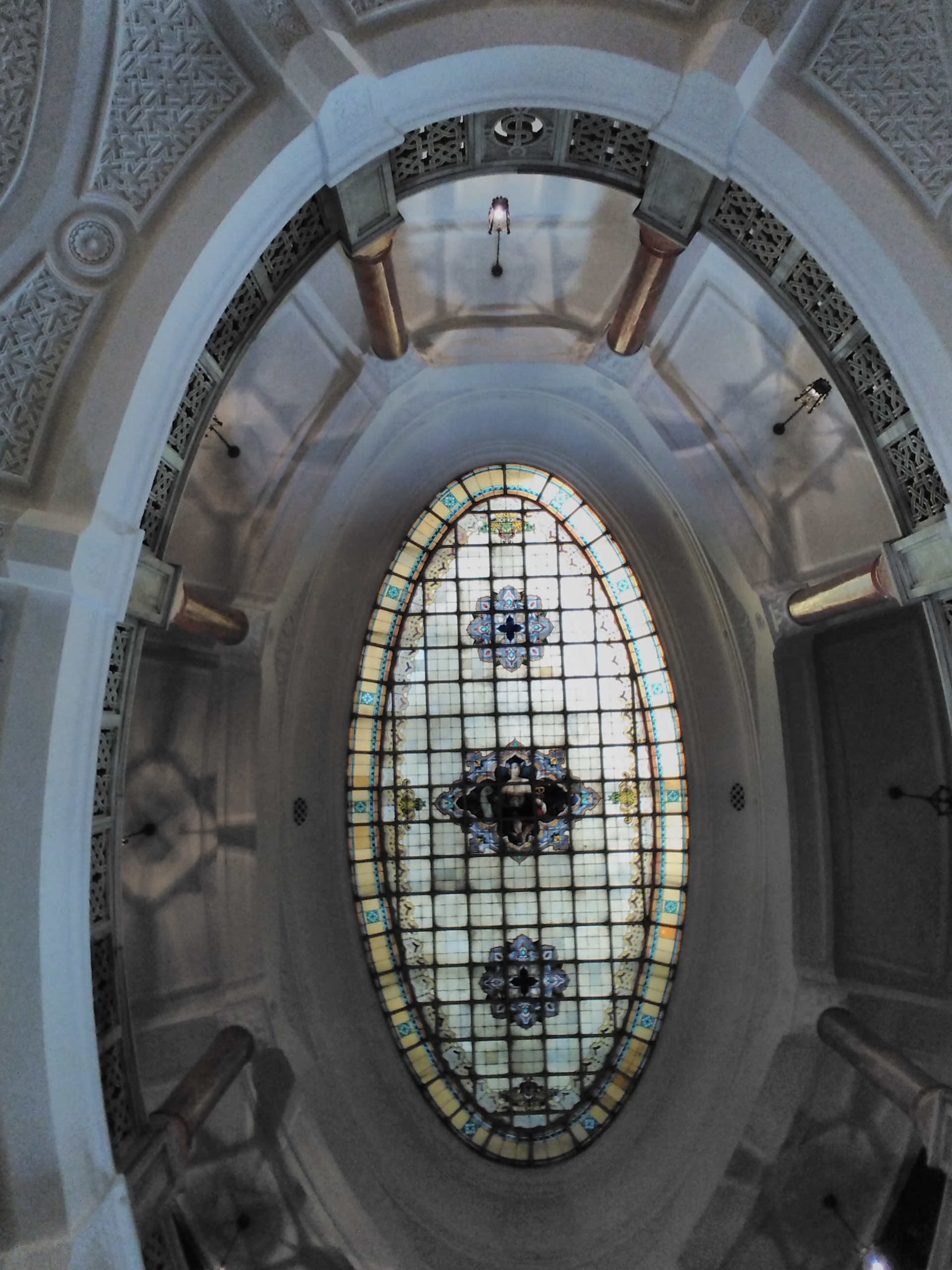
Türkiye İş Bankası building on Ulus Square in Ankara

In May 1998, 12.3% of the Bank's total shares previously held by the Turkish Treasury have been sold to national and international investors in a public offering. The states Pension Fund has brokered the offering of stock options to employees and retired staff in the company, which has reached 41.5%. As of December 2021, 37.3% of İşbank shares are held by İşbank's own Pension Fund, 28.1% of which are represented by Republican People's Party (CHP), and 34.6% are free float. In February 2019, Turkish President Recep Tayyip Erdoğan announced that he advocated the transfer of the shares held by the CHP to the treasury.

Işbank’s shares are listed on Borsa Istanbul and its depository receipts are traded on London Stock Exchange as GDR (REG S).

== International ==
Countries in which İşBank has operations, branches and representative offices

İşbank's international network comprises 14 branches in the Turkish Republic of Northern Cyprus, two branches in Iraq, Kosovo and the United Kingdom respectively, one branch in Bahrain and one representative office in both Cairo and Shanghai. İşbank's German banking subsidiary (İşbank AG) has 9 branches in Germany and one branch in the Netherlands. İşbank's Russian banking subsidiary (JSC İşbank) has one branch and two representative offices in Russia. There is also a subsidiary in Georgia (JSC İşbank Georgia) with branches in Tbilisi and Batumi.

== See also ==
- İşbank Museum Ankara
- İşbank Museum İstanbul
- List of companies of Turkey
- List of banks in Turkey

== Sources ==
- Annual Report 2019 (PDF), İşbank, 2019, archived from the original (PDF) on 2020-04-15
- Annual Report 2015 (PDF), İşbank, 2015, archived from the original (PDF) on 9 August 2016
- Isbank on the Forbes Global 2000 List, 2015
