= İşbank Museum =

Museum in Istanbul, Turkey

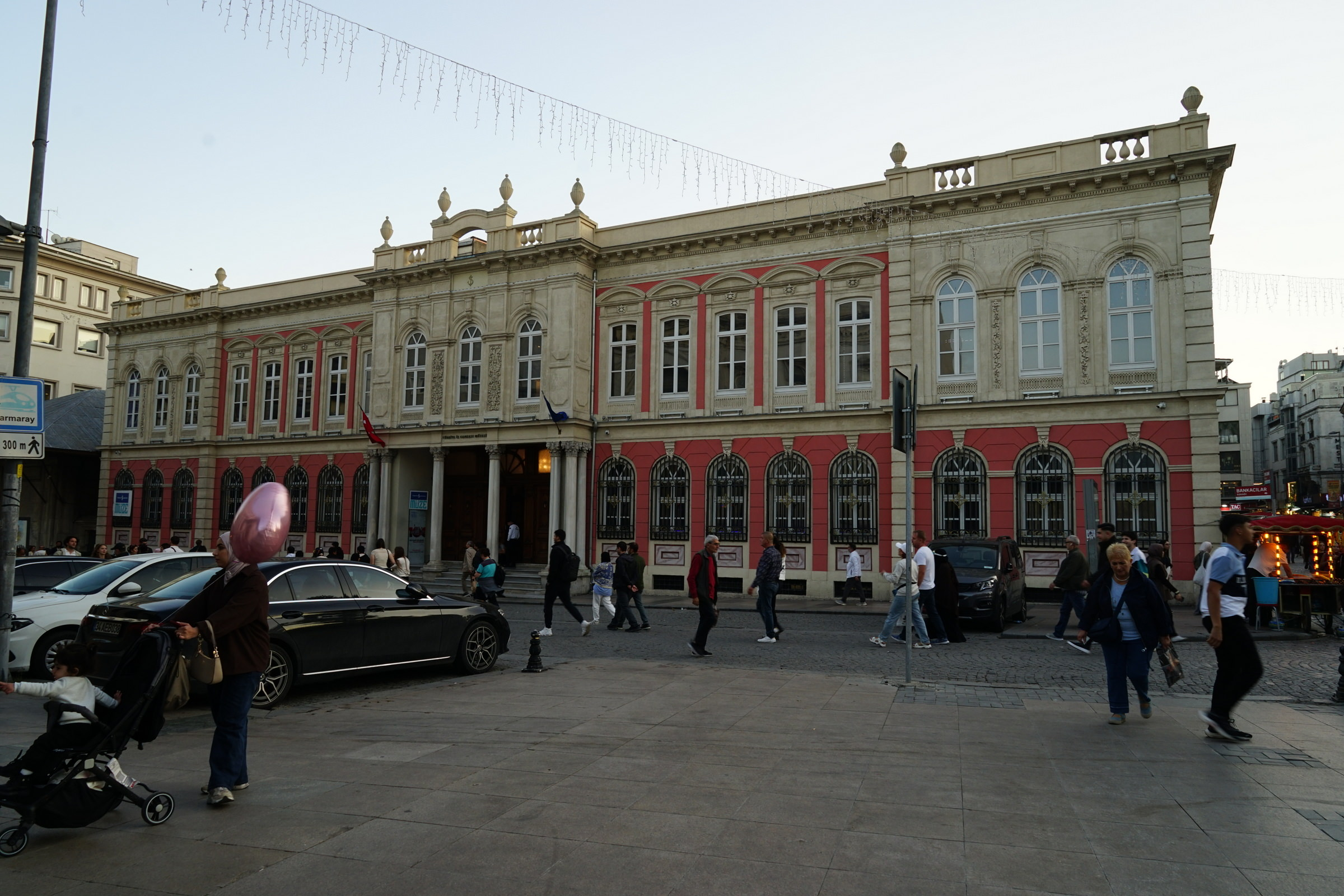

- Location of İşbank Museum in Fatih district, Istanbul
- Established: 2007; 19 years ago
- Coordinates: 41°00′58″N 28°58′15″E
- Type: Banking
- Owner: İş Bankası

İşbank Museum is a bank museum in Istanbul, Turkey.

== Location ==
The museum is located in the business quarter of Fatih municipality in Istanbul. Its distance to Haliç (Golden Horn) is about 200 metres (660 ft). The main entrance is on Bankalar Street, a busy street to the southeast of the museum.

== History of the bank ==
İşbank (more formally Türkiye İş Bankası) was founded in 1924 . Although there were other banks which were established during the Ottoman Empire (pre 1922) era, İşbank was the first to be established in Republican era. One of the founders of the museum was Mustafa Kemal Atatürk the founder of Turkish Republic.

== History of the building ==
The building of the museum was constructed in 1892 as the main post office. In 1917 the building was sold to a local bank and in 1927 when the local bank was bought by İşbank, the building became the Istanbul branch office of İşbank. In 1950s when other branch offices in Istanbul were opened, the branch office was renamed Yeni Camii (“New Mosque”) referring to New Mosque which is to almost adjacent to the building. The branch office was in use till 2004. In 2005 İşbank decided to establish a museum. After renewal, the museum was opened to public on 14 October 2007.

== The museum ==
In basement, the former archive rooms are designed as a museum depot and a conference room. The deposit boxes are kept to be displayed. The cash desks in the ground floor are kept as they were and the former security rooms are redesigned as a bookshop and an information desk. The main show rooms are in the first floor.

== Gallery ==
İşbank Museum Office

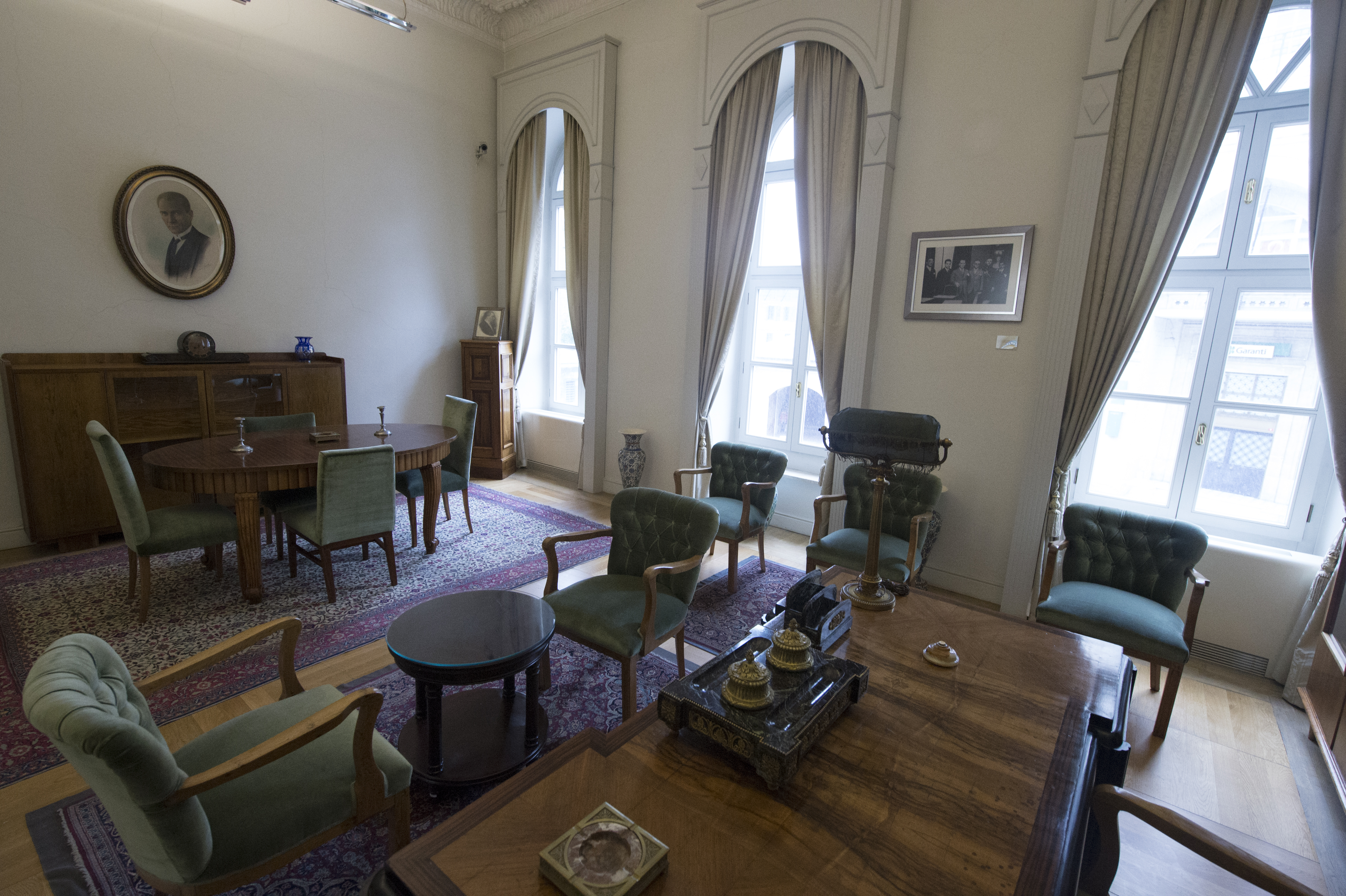
İşbank Museum Office

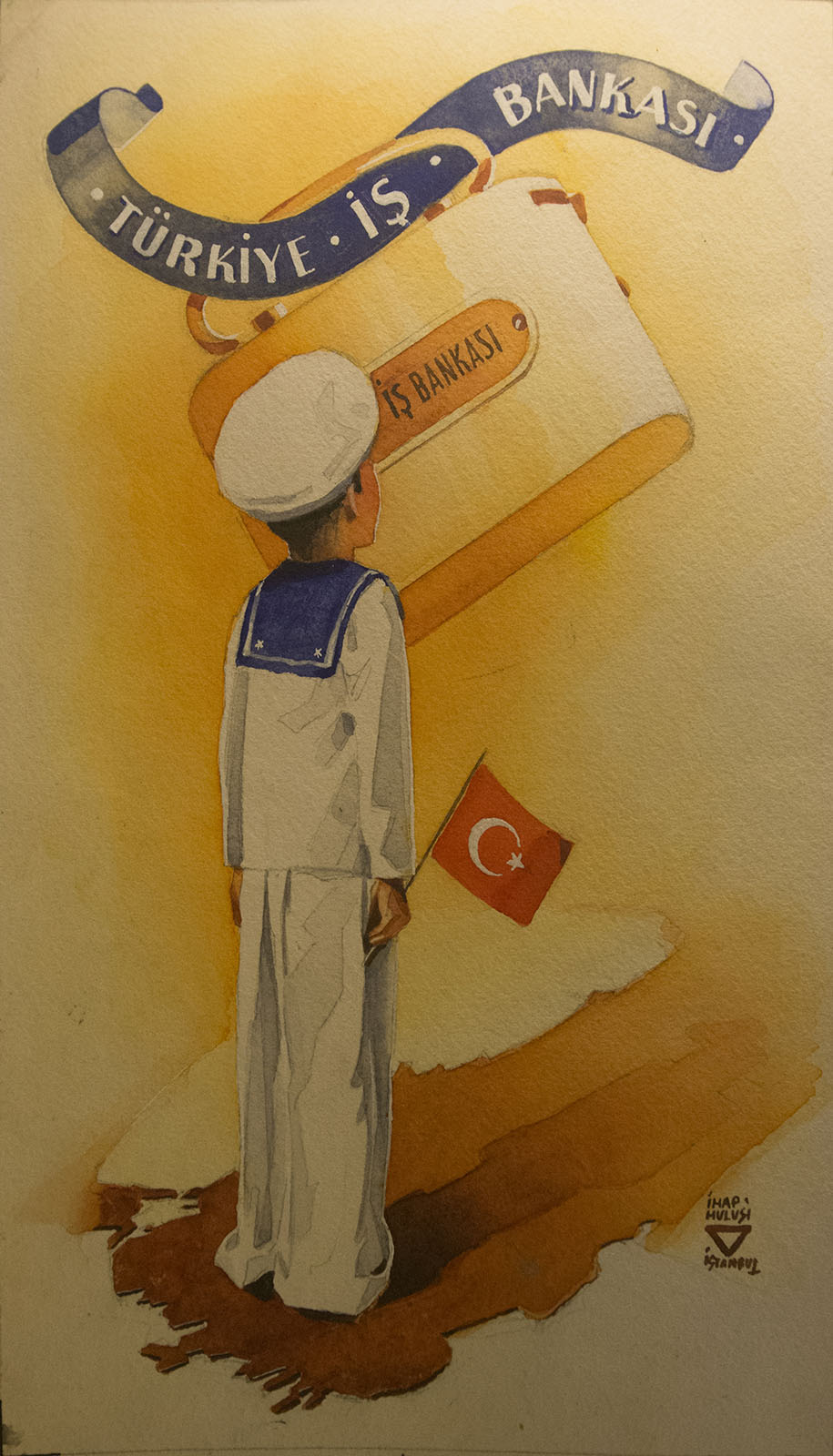
İşbank Museum Advertising

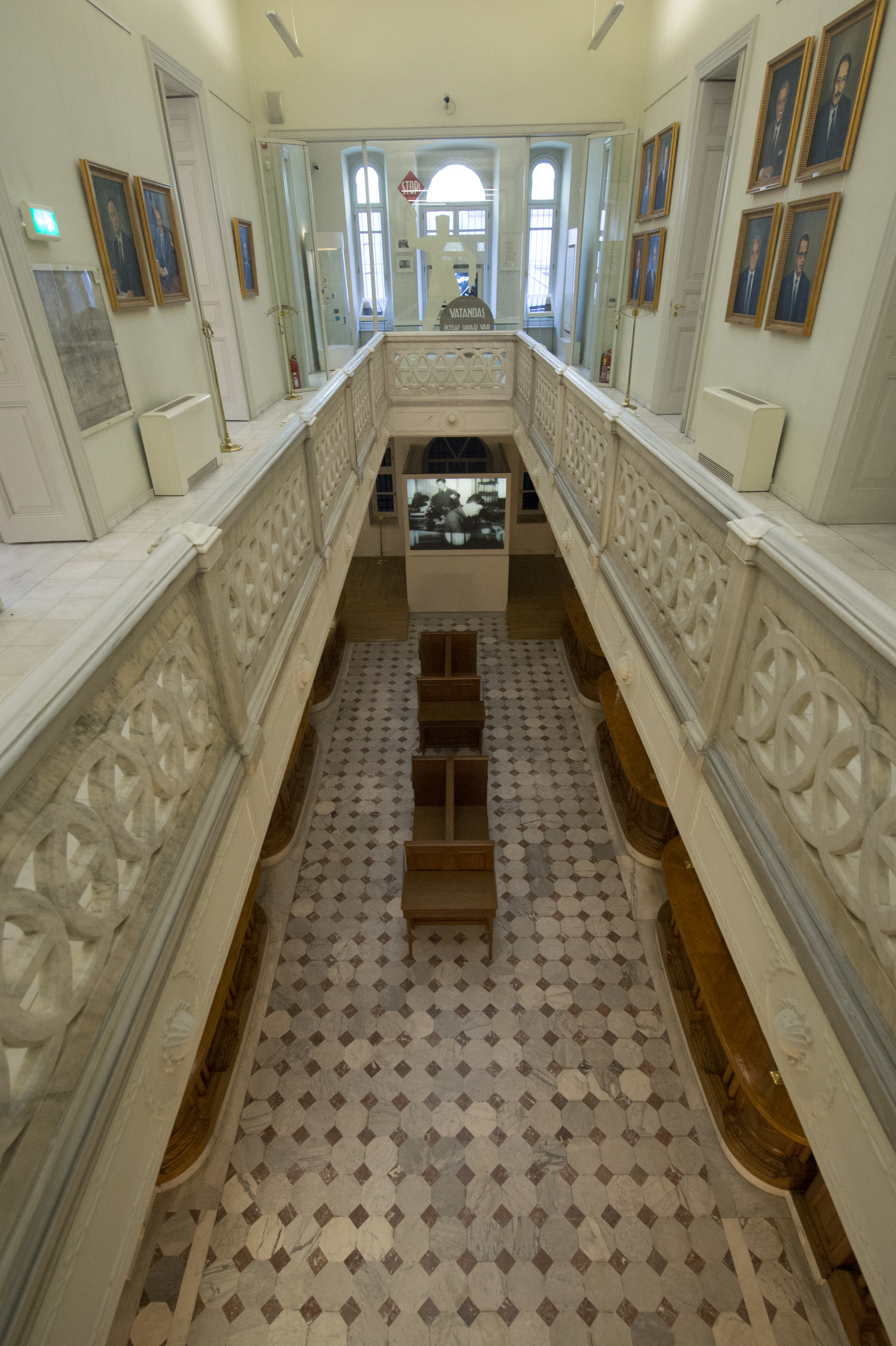
İşbank Museum Vide

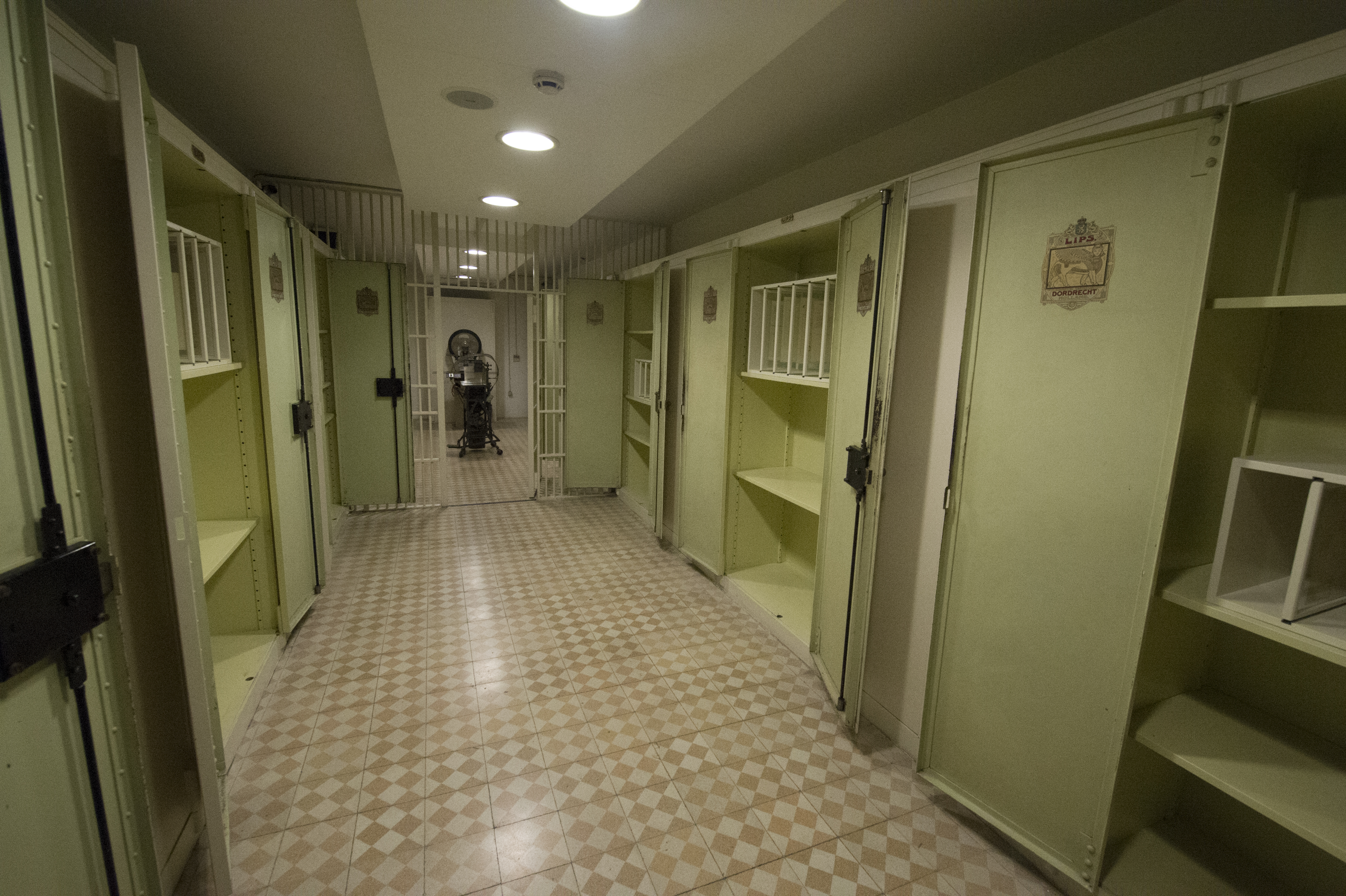
İşbank Museum Vault area

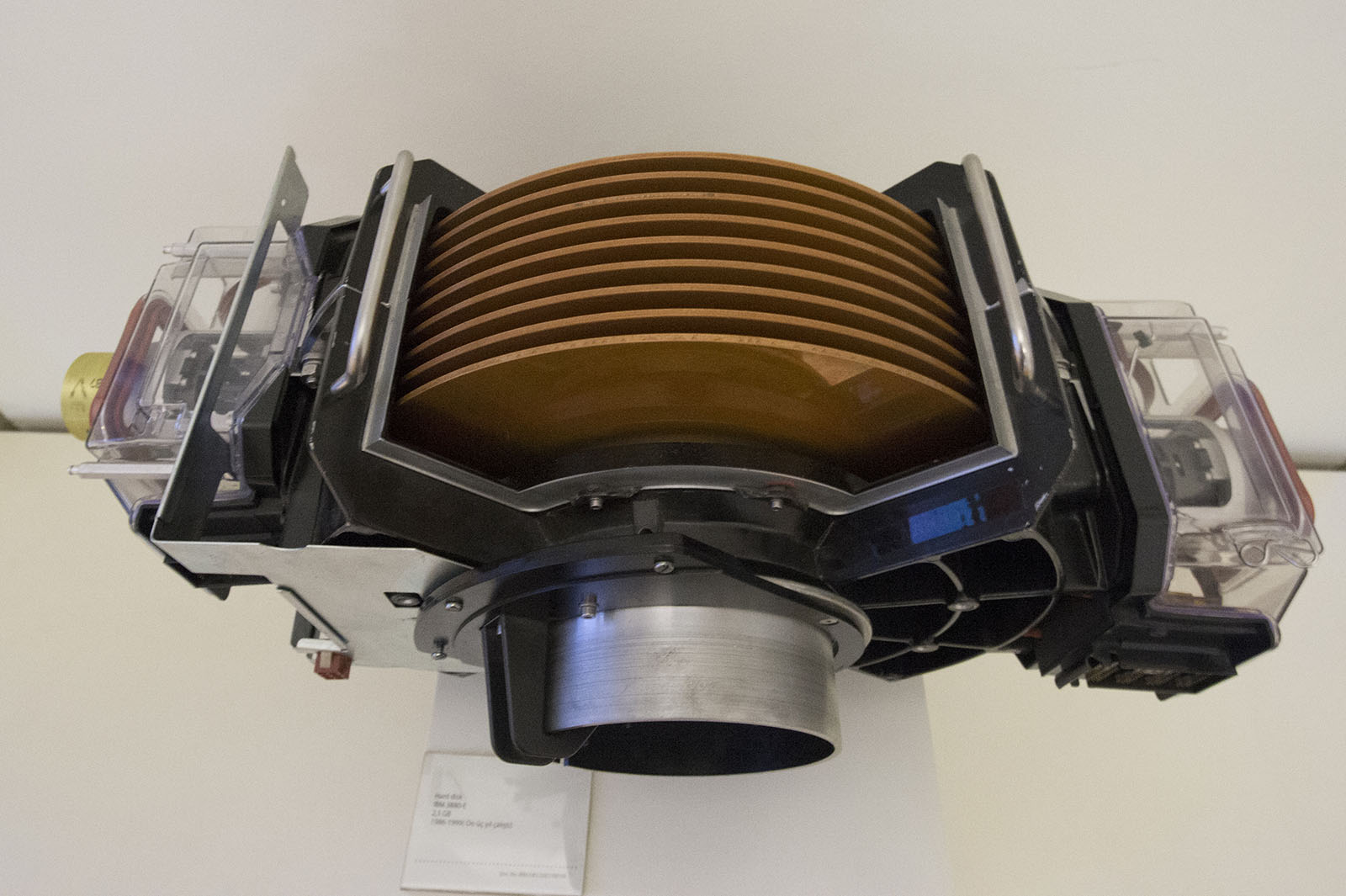
İşbank Museum Digital storage
