= May Hamilton Beattie =

Scottish researcher

- Born: 13 April 1908; Edinburgh
- Died: February 1997 (aged 88)
- Partner: Colin P. Beattie

Academic background
- Education: University of Edinburgh
- Thesis: Studies in microbic dissociation and variation with special reference to the acid-fast and the diphtheroid bacilli (1932)

Academic work
- Discipline: Bacteriologist
- Institutions: University of Edinburgh

May Hamilton Beattie (13 April 1908 – February 1997) was a Scottish researcher dedicated to delving into the beauty of Oriental rugs, establishing it as a field of research at the University of Oxford.

== Early life ==
Beattie was born in Edinburgh in 1908. At the age of 21, she finished her Bachelor of Arts degree at the University of British Columbia. In the following three years, Beattie undertook scientific research training and earned a Ph.D. degree from the University of Edinburgh. In 1937, she quit pursuing her medical degree.

== Career ==
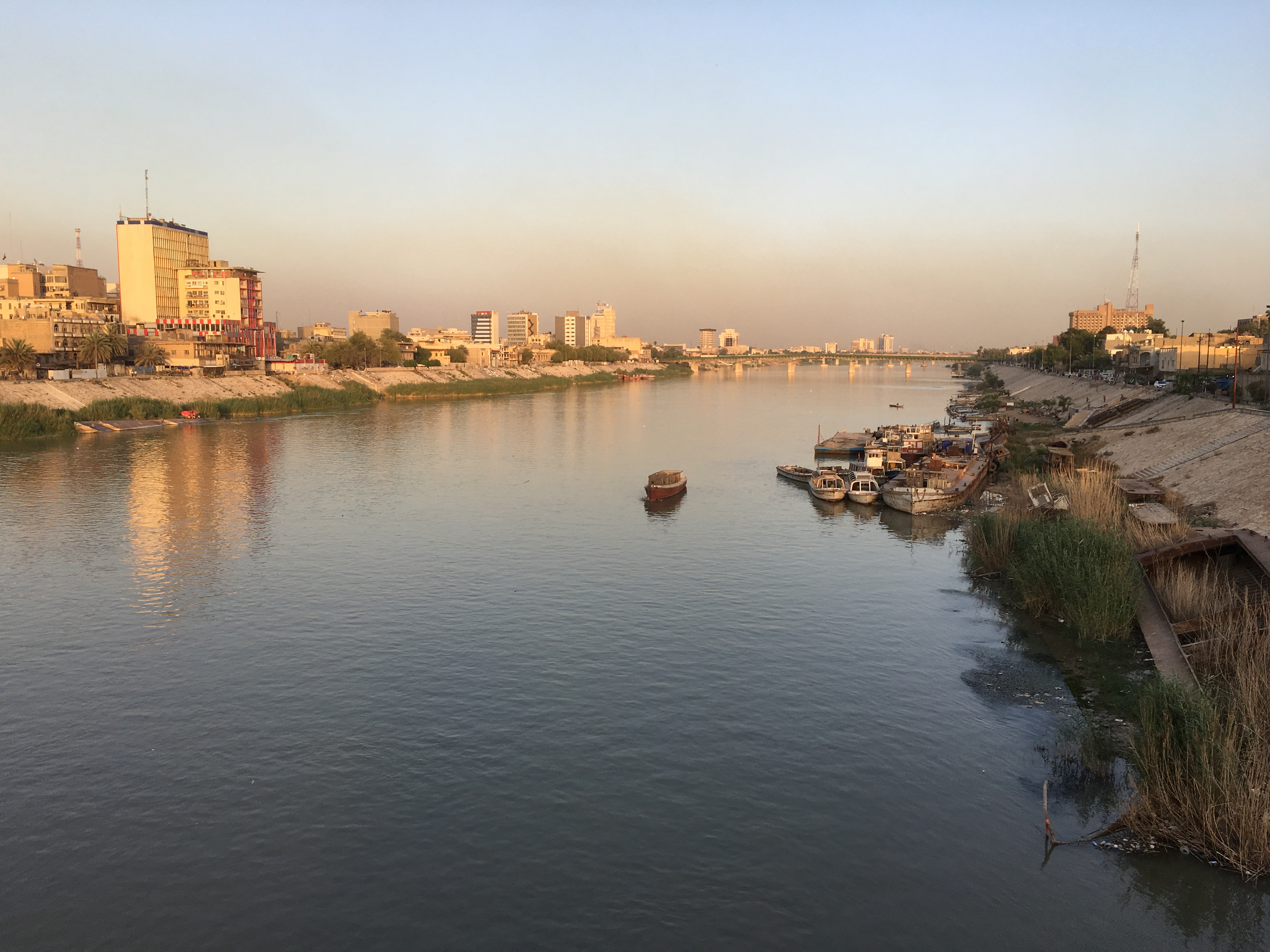
Sunset in Baghdad

Beattie nurtured her interest and started her collection of rugs and carpets when she lived in Baghdad with her husband, who taught Bacteriology and was a director of Pasteur Institute. She examined and appreciated the materials and texture of rugs in scientific approaches with her related academic background. To gather information on textile materials, she took her journey to various places worldwide for her research on every aspect of the carpet. Moreover, Beattie worked with Charles Grant Ellis, the American Historian, to conduct further and thorough studies on the origin of rugs.

== Family ==
While Beattie gave up her medical degree, she married Dr. Colin P. Beattie, who was appointed Professor of Pasteur Institute. They moved to Baghdad and lived for nine years until the evacuation to India during World War II, ultimately returning to England in 1946.

== Contributions ==
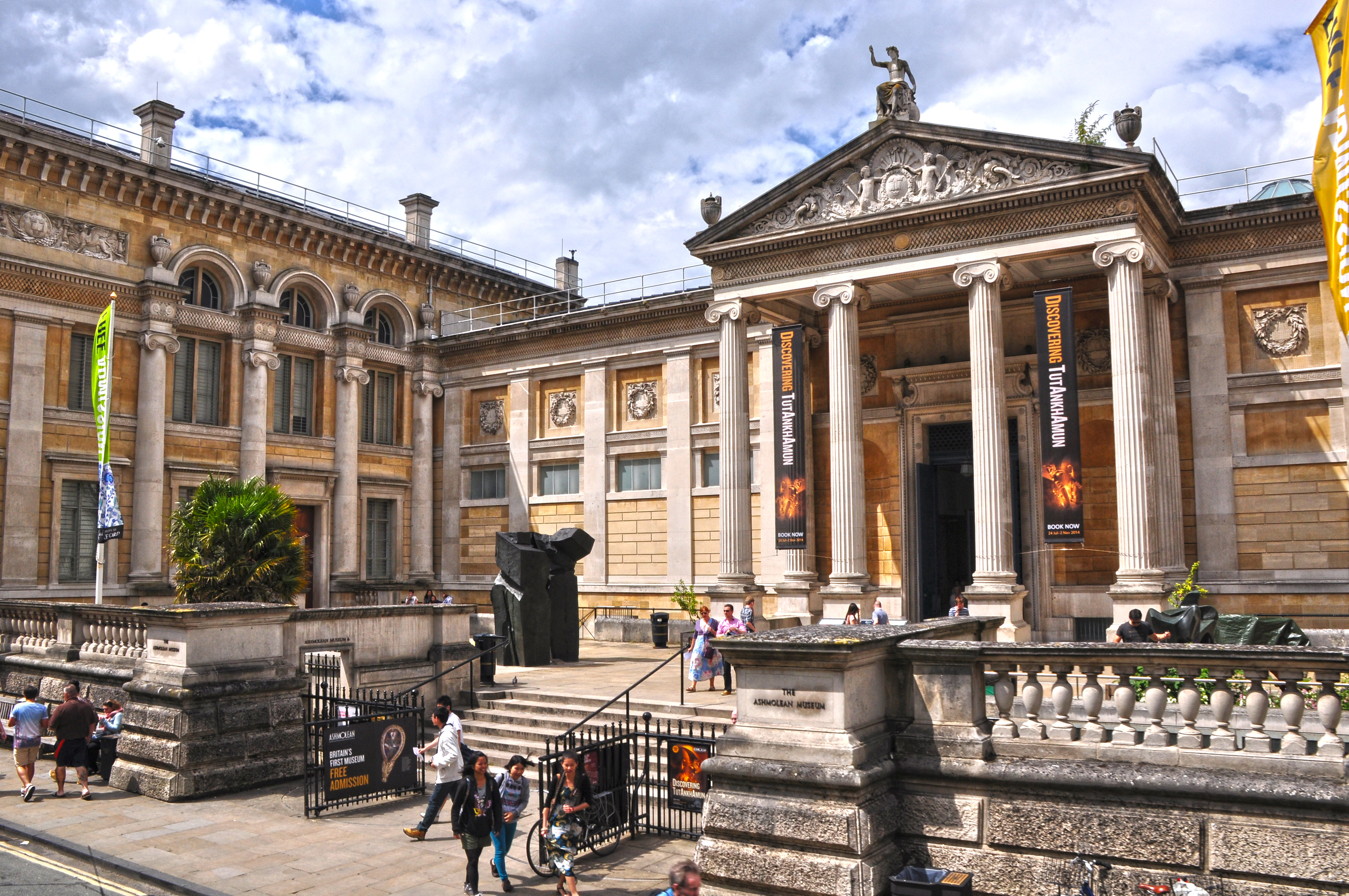
Ashmolean Museum

Beattie wrote several articles and catalogues for the journal of rugs and several collections. In 1976, she gathered her accomplishment at the Mappin Art Gallery in Sheffield, proclaiming her discovery of rugs in various designs. Regarding the results of her study, which had been archived by the Ashmolean Museum. Also, to bring up more scholars focusing on carpets and rugs, In 2000, the May Beattie fellow in Carpet Studies was built up at the Ashmolean Museum by May Beattie.

== Publication ==
- Recipes from Baghdad, edited by May H. Beattie (Indian Red Cross, 1946)
- Carpets of Central Persia, With Special Reference to Rugs of Kirman, edited by May H. Beattie (World of Islam Festival Pub. Co., 1976)
- The Thyssen-Bornemisza Collection of oriental rugs, edited by May H. Beattie (Villa Favorita, 1972)
