= Saeculum (journal) =

- Language: German, English, French

Publication details
- History: 1950-present
- Publisher: Böhlau Verlag (Germany)
- Frequency: Biannual

Standard abbreviations
- ISO 4: Saeculum

Indexing
- ISSN: 0080-5319

Links
- Journal homepage

Saeculum ('Time' or 'Century') is a German scholarly journal. It was launched in 1950 by the historian Georg Stadtmüller and was originally published by Verlag Karl Alber. Since 2003 it has been published by Böhlau Verlag.

Subtitled "Jahrbuch für Universalgeschichte", the journal is devoted to world history and mainly focuses on social, economic, and cultural aspects. It features a wide variety of topics by scholars from various disciplines. An editorial published in 2013 states that it is "open to ... contributions ranging from pre- and protohistory to the present" and "to all historical topics including natural environments" and that it seeks to overcome a eurocentric perspective by publishing articles on all world regions and by encouraging comparison and the observation of transcultural entanglements. According to a mission statement included in the journal's blurb, it also offers a "forum for fundamental debates" in history and cultural studies.

Saeculum is a peer-reviewed journal and is published biannually. Its general editors are the German historians Peter Burschel and Christoph Marx. It publishes articles in German, English, and French.
