= List of companies of Turkey =

Location of Turkey

Turkey is a transcontinental presidential republic in Eurasia, mainly on the Anatolian peninsula in Western Asia, with a smaller portion on the Balkan peninsula in Southeast Europe. Turkey is a democratic, secular, unitary, constitutional republic with a diverse cultural heritage. As of July 2024, there are 2.439,859 registered companies based in the country.

The country has an emerging market economy as defined by the IMF. Turkey is among the world's developed countries according to the CIA World Factbook. Turkey is also defined by economists and political scientists as one of the world's newly industrialized countries. Turkey has the world's 17th largest nominal GDP, and 11th largest GDP by PPP. The country is among the world's leading producers of agricultural products; textiles; motor vehicles, ships and other transportation equipment; construction materials; consumer electronics and home appliances.

For further information on the types of business entities in this country and their abbreviations, see "Business entities in Turkey".

== Largest firms ==
The list shows firms ranked in the Forbes Global 2000 by total revenues reported as of 2024.

Rank	Image	Name	2024 Revenues (USD)	Employees	Notes
309		Koç Holding	$67.4B	123,970	Diverse industrial conglomerate controlled by third-generation members of the Koç family. Subsidiaries include Arçelik, Divan Group, Tofaş and Yapı Kredi.
525	İş Bank Tower	İşbank	$18.27B	21,167	Established by Mustafa Kemal Atatürk in 1924 to be the first national bank of Turkey, it is the largest and operates in 11 countries. 28% of its shares are still held by the Republican People's Party.
676	TurkishAirlinesHQIstanbul	Turkish Airlines	$22.74B	40,264	State-owned airline capitalized in 1956 and is the world's largest airline by number of countries served, and ninth largest by revenue. Subsidiaries include A Jet, SunExpress and Air Albania.
759	Vakıfbank genel müdürlüğü	Vakıfbank	$22.7B	18,579	Owned by Turkey Wealth Fund, Vakıfbank is a state enterprise and is the second-largest bank in Turkey in terms of total assets held. It also operates in the United States, Qatar, Iraq, Qatar, and Austria.
878	Sabancı Center from Istanbul Sapphire, Levent Financial District, Istanbul, Turkey.	Sabancı Holding	$37.3B	62,853	Subsidiaries include Akbank, TEMSA and Enerjisa
957		Halkbank	$20.6B	18,967	
1446		BİM	$14.2B	86,647	Retail discount market group that operates in Turkey, Morocco and Egypt.

== Notable firms ==
This list includes notable companies with primary headquarters located in the country. The industry and sector follow the Industry Classification Benchmark taxonomy. Organizations which have ceased operations are included and noted as defunct.

Active firms
State-owned firms
Defunct firms

Name	Industry	Sector	Headquarters	Founded	Notes
Akbank	Financials	Banks	Istanbul	1948	Banking, part of Sabancı Holding
Aksa	Basic materials	Chemicals	Yalova	1968	Chemicals
Alarko Holding	Industrials	Construction & materials	Istanbul	1954	Construction and mechanical industries
Anadolu Isuzu	Consumer goods	Automobiles & parts	Istanbul	1984	Automotive, part of Isuzu (Japan)
Arçelik	Consumer goods	Personal & household goods	Istanbul	1955	Home appliances, part of Koç Holding
Arkem	Basic materials	Chemicals	Istanbul	1991	Chemicals
Assan	Consumer goods	Automobiles & parts	Istanbul	1994	Automotive, owned by Hyundai Motor Company
Aselsan	Industrials	Aerospace & defense	Ankara	1975	Defense electronic systems
Askam	Industrials	Industrial engineering	Istanbul	1964	Commercial trucks, defunct 2015
Avea	Telecommunications	Mobile telecommunications	Istanbul	2004	Mobile phone operation, part of Türk Telekom
Aygaz	Oil & gas	Oil & gas producers	Istanbul	1961	Propane gas, part of Koç Holding
Banvit	Consumer goods	Food & beverage	Bandırma	1968	Poultry
Basak Traktor	Industrials	Industrial engineering	Adapazarı	1914	Tractors
Baykar	Industrials	Defence	Istanbul	1984	UAV
Beko	Consumer goods	Personal & household goods	Istanbul	1967	Home electronics, part of Koç Holding
BİM	Consumer goods	Retail	Istanbul	1995	Grocery
BMC	Consumer goods	Automobiles & parts	İzmir	1964	Automotive
Borusan Holding	Conglomerate	-	Istanbul	1944	Conglomerate: Steel, energy, logistics
BOTAŞ	Oil & gas	Oil & gas producers	Ankara	1974	State-owned oil/energy
Çalık Enerji	Oil & gas	Oil & gas producers	Istanbul	1998	Energy
Canovate	Consumer goods	Personal & household goods	Istanbul	1965	Electrical equipment
Cengiz Holding	Conglomerate	-	Istanbul	1980	
Çiçeksepeti	Consumer goods	Retail	Istanbul	2006	online retailer: food, flowers
Ciner Holding	Conglomerate	-	Istanbul	1978	Energy, media, commerce
Çukurova Holding	Conglomerate	-	Istanbul	1923	Construction, media, telecommunications
DenizBank	Financials	Banks	Istanbul	1938	Private bank, part of Sberbank (Russia)
Dilek Ecza Deposu	Health care	Pharmaceuticals & biotechnology	Antalya	1991	Pharmaceutical distribution
Doğan Holding	Conglomerate	-	Istanbul	1980	Energy, media
Doğtaş	Consumer goods	Personal & household goods	Biga	1972	Furniture
Doğuş Group	Conglomerate	-	Istanbul	1951	Highly diversified conglomerate
Eczacıbaşı	Health care	Pharmaceuticals & biotechnology	Istanbul	1942	Pharmaceuticals
Efes Beverage Group	Consumer goods	Food & beverage	Istanbul	1969	Brewery
Elektrik Üretim	Utilities	Electricity	Ankara	2001	Energy
Enerco Energy	Oil & gas	Oil & gas producers	Istanbul	2004	Natural gas
Enka İnşaat ve Sanayi A.Ş.	Industrials	Construction & materials	Istanbul	1957	Construction
Erdem Architects	Industrials	Support services	Ankara	1998	Architects
Erdemir	Basic materials	Basic resources	Karadeniz Ereğli	1967	Iron and steel
Erkunt Group	Industrials	Industrial engineering	Ankara	1953	Tractors
Estap	Consumer goods	Personal & household goods	Istanbul	1989	Electronics
Eti Maden	Industrials	Mining	Ankara	1993	Mining
EUROTAI	Industrials	Aerospace & defense	Ankara	1997	Helicopters, joint with Airbus Helicopters and TAI
Eurotem	Industrials	Industrial Transportation	Istanbul	2006	Trains, joint with Hyundai Rotem (South Korea)
EÜAŞ	Utilities	Electricity	Ankara	2001	Electric power
Fibabanka	Financials	Banks	Istanbul	2010	Private bank
Finansbank	Financials	Banks	Istanbul	1987	Banking, part of the QNB Group (Qatar)
GAMA Endustri	Industrials	Construction & materials	Ankara	1970	Construction
Garanti Bank	Financials	Banks	Istanbul	1946	Private bank
Goldas	Consumer goods	Personal & household goods	Istanbul	1993	Jewelry
Gülermak	Industrials	Rail transportation	Ankara	1958	Construction
Halk Bankasi	Financials	Banks	Ankara	1938	State-owned Banking
HAVELSAN	Software	Defence	Ankara	1982	Government owned company
Hidromek	Industrials	Heavy Equipment	Ankara	1978	Construction
Hunca Cosmetics	Consumer goods	Personal & household goods	Istanbul	1957	Cosmetics
Inebolu Shipyard	Industrials	Industrial Transportation	İnebolu	2008	Shipbuilding
Isdemir	Basic materials	Basic resources	İskenderun	1970	Steel
Istanbul	Consumer goods	Personal & household goods	Istanbul	1980	Musical instruments
Istanbul Metro	Consumer services	Transportation	Istanbul	1989	Metro
Kalyon Group	Industrials	Construction & materials	Istanbul	1974	Construction
Kardemir Karabük Demir Çelik Fabrikalari A.S.	Basic materials	Basic resources	Karabük	1937	Iron and steel
Karsan	Consumer goods	Automobiles & parts	Bursa	1966	Automotive
Kayi Construction	Industrials	Construction & materials	Istanbul	1991	Construction
Kimetsan	Basic materials	Chemicals	Ankara	1986	Chemicals
Koç Holding	Conglomerate	-	Istanbul	1926	Energy, consumer goods, industrials, financials
Koton	Consumer goods	Personal & household goods	Istanbul	1988	Clothing
Limak Holding	Industrials	Construction & materials	Istanbul	1976	Construction
Mako Elektrik	Consumer goods	Automobiles & parts	Bursa	1970	Automotive
Mavi Jeans	Consumer goods	Personal & household goods	Istanbul	1991	Clothing
Mechanical and Chemical Industry Corporation	Industrials	Aerospace & defense	Ankara	1950	Military
Migros Türk	Consumer services	Retail	Istanbul	1975	Supermarket, part of Koç Holding
Nurol Holding	Industrials	Construction & materials	Ankara	1989	Construction
Omsan	Industrials	Support services	Istanbul	1978	Logistics
OPET	Oil & gas	Oil & gas producers	Mersin	1982	Oil and gas, part of Koç Holding
Otokar	Consumer goods	Automobiles & parts	Sakarya	1963	Automotive, part of Koç Holding
Otosan	Consumer goods	Automobiles & parts	Gölcük	1959	Automotive, part of Koç Holding
Oyak-Renault	Consumer goods	Automobiles & parts	Bursa	1969	Automotive
Ozaltin	Consumer goods	Automobiles & parts	Adana	2000	Automotive
Pancar Motor	Industrials	Industrial engineering	Konya	1956	Diesel engines
Petkim	Oil & gas	Oil & gas producers	İzmir	1965	Petrochemical
Petrol Ofisi	Oil & gas	Oil & gas producers	Istanbul	1941	Oil and gas
Polimeks	Industrials	Construction & materials	Istanbul	1995	Construction
Poliya	Basic materials	Chemicals	Istanbul	1983	Composites and chemicals
PTT	Industrials	Postal service	Ankara	1840	State-owned
Roketsan	Industrials	Defence	Ankara	1988	Missile manufacturer
Sabancı Holding	Conglomerate	-	Istanbul	1926	Financials, energy, retail
Sahinler Holding	Industrials	General industrials	Istanbul	1984	Textile
Salcano	Consumer goods	Personal & household goods	Istanbul	1975	Bicycle
Şekerbank	Financials	Banks	Eskişehir	1953	Banking
Şişecam	Industrials	Construction & materials	Istanbul	1935	Glass manufacturing
Solimpeks	Oil & gas	Alternative energy	Konya	2001	Renewable energy
STFA Group	Industrials	Construction & materials	Istanbul	1938	Civil engineering and construction
Tabanlioglu Architects	Industrials	Support services	Istanbul	1956	Architects
TAV Airports Holding	Industrials	Industrial Transportation	Istanbul	1997	Airport
TCDD	Industrials	Railroads	Ankara	1929	State-owned
TCDD Taşımacılık	Industrials	Transportation services	Ankara	2016	State-owned
Tekel	Consumer goods	Food & beverage	Istanbul	1862	Tobacco and alcoholic beverages
Tekfen	Industrials	Construction & materials	Istanbul	1956	Construction
Temsa	Consumer goods	Automobiles & parts	Adana	1968	Automotive, part of Sabancı Holding
Tersan Shipyard	Industrials	Industrial Transportation	Yalova	1990	Shipbuilding
Tofas	Consumer goods	Automobiles & parts	Istanbul	1968	Automotive, part of Koç Holding
TÜLOMSAŞ	Industrials	Industrial Transportation	Eskişehir	1894	Locomotive manufacture
Tüpraş	Oil & gas	Oil & gas producers	Kocaeli	1983	Oil refining, part of Koç Holding
Türk Telekom	Telecommunications	Fixed line telecommunications	Ankara	1839	State-owned Telecommunication
Turkcell	Telecommunications	Mobile telecommunications	Istanbul	1994	State-owned Mobile phone operation
Turkish Aerospace Industries (TAI)	Industrials	Aerospace & defense	Ankara	2005	State-owned Aircraft manufacture
Turkish Airlines	Consumer services	Travel & leisure	Istanbul	1933	Airline
Türkiye Is Bankasi	Financials	Banks	Istanbul	1924	Banking
Türkiye Petrolleri Anonim Ortaklığı (TPAO)	Oil & gas	Oil & gas producers	Ankara	1954	State-owned Oil and gas industry
TÜVASAŞ	Industrials	Industrial Transportation	Adapazarı	1951	Railcar manufacturer
Ugur Cooling	Industrials	General industrials	Aydın	1954	Cooling equipment
Ugur Group Companies	Conglomerate	-	Aydın	1954	Consumer goods, medical
Ülker	Consumer goods	Food & beverage	Istanbul	1944	Food production
VakıfBank	Financials	Banks	Istanbul	1954	State-owned Banking
Vakko	Consumer goods	Personal & household goods	Istanbul	1934	Clothing
Vestel	Consumer goods	Personal & household goods	Manisa	1984	Home electronics
Vitra	Health care	Health care equipment & services	Istanbul	1942	Sanitary goods
Yapi Merkezi	Industrials	Construction & materials	Istanbul	1965	Construction
Yapi ve Kredi Bankasi	Financials	Banks	Istanbul	1944	Banking
Yüksel Tohumculuk	Consumer goods	Food & beverage	Antalya	1996	Seeds, plant breeding
Ziraat Bankasi	Financials	Banks	Ankara	1863	State-owned banking
Zorlu Holding	Conglomerate	-	Istanbul	1990	Textiles, electronics

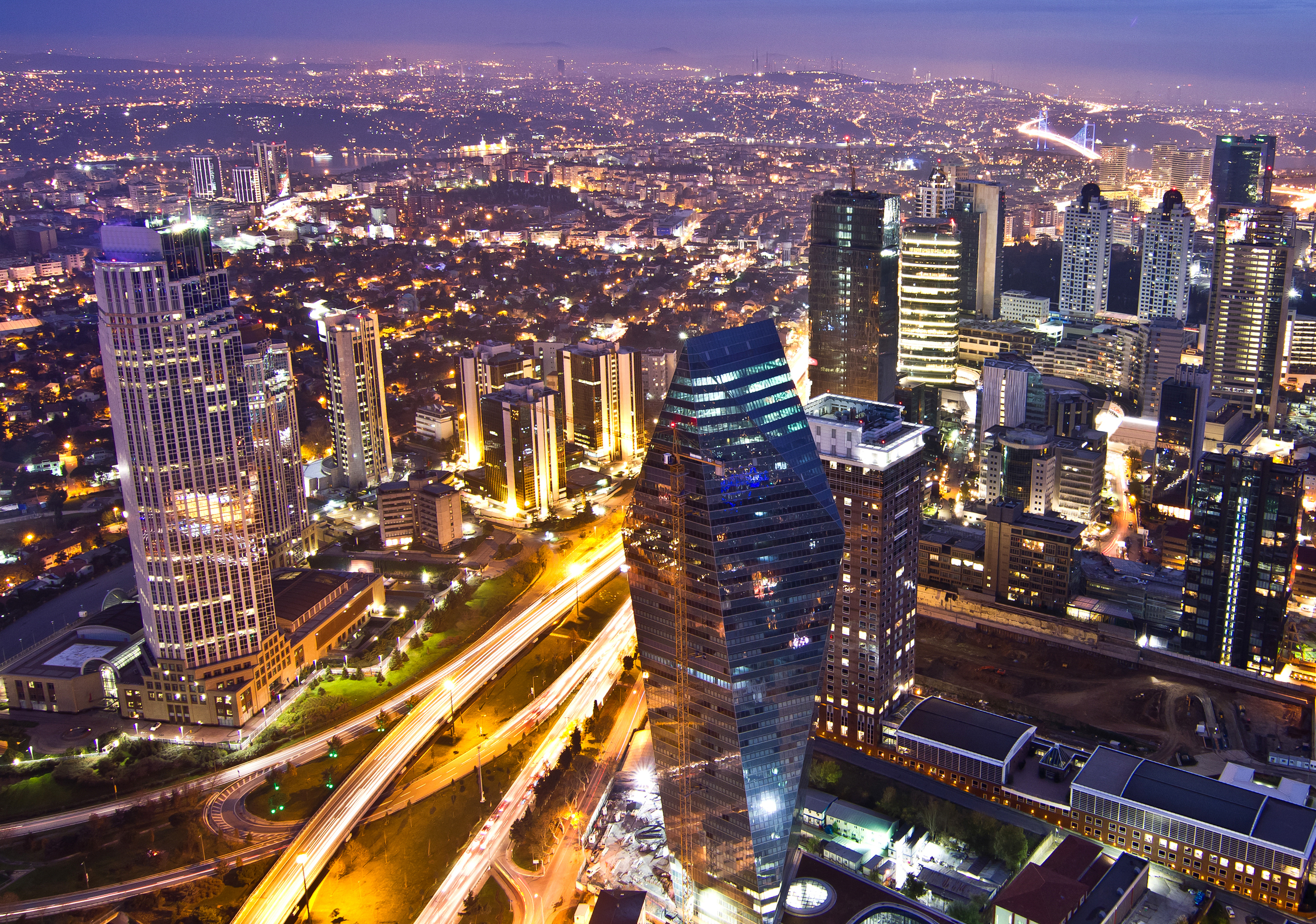
A view of Levent, one of the main business districts in Istanbul and home to the city's tallest buildings.

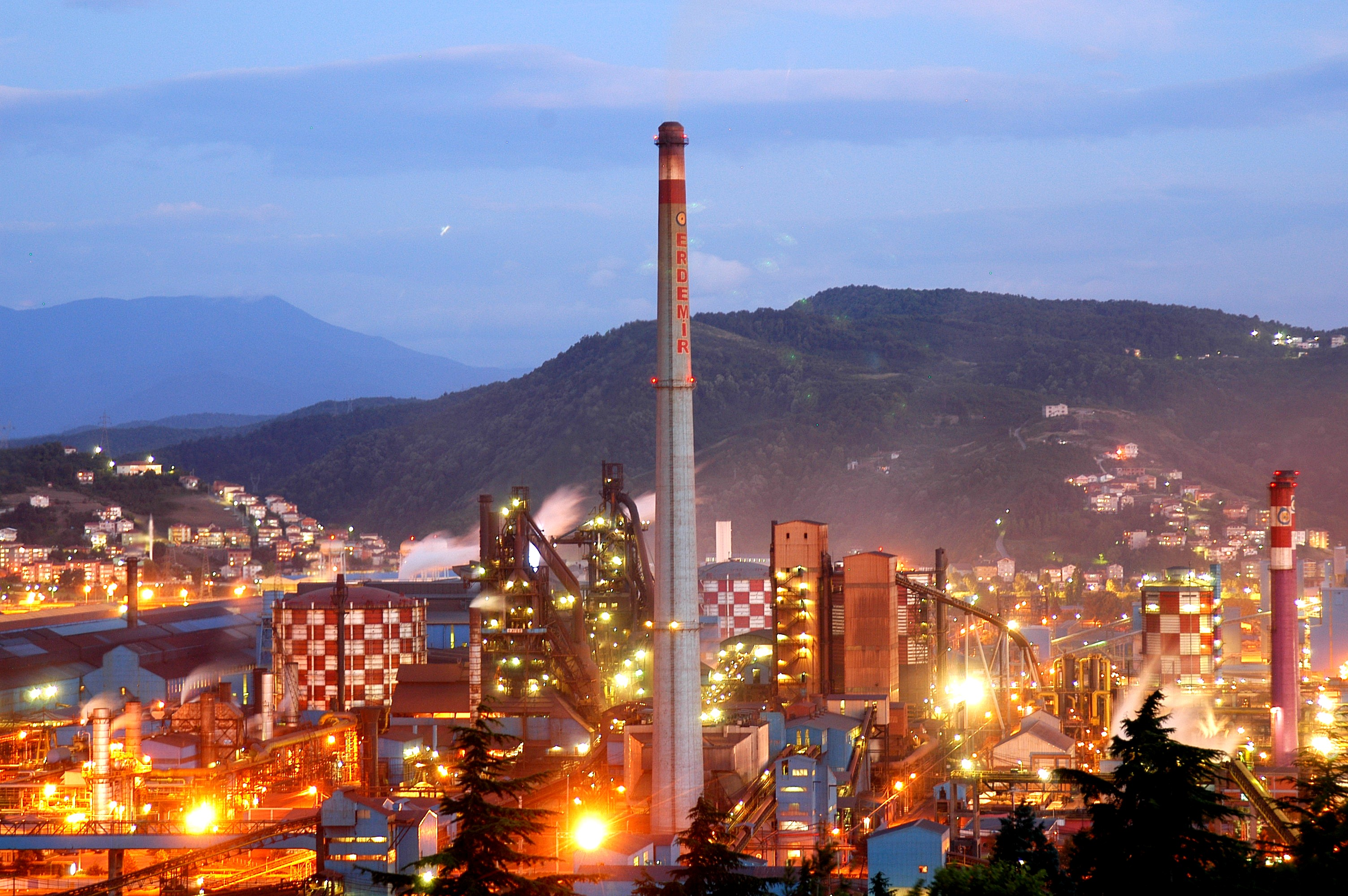
Turkish steel works of Erdemir.

The Eczacıbaşı offices in Istanbul.

== See also ==
- Economy of Turkey
