= Yüksel =

Yüksel or Yuksel is a Turkish given name and surname meaning "rise!", imperative of "yükselmek" ("to rise"). Notable people with the name include:

== Given name ==
- Yüksel Alkan (1931–2017), Turkish basketball player
- Yüksel Ayaydın (born 1989), Turkish kickboxer
- Yüksel Coşkunyürek (born 1965), Turkish politician
- Yüksel Koptagel (born 1931), Turkish composer and pianist
- Yüksel Pazarkaya (born 1940), Turkish writer, translator and broadcaster
- Yüksel Sariyar (born 1979), Austrian footballer
- Yüksel Yavuz (born 1964), Turkish-born German Kurdish film director
- Yüksel Yesilova (born 1972), Turkish football player and coach
- Yuksel Yumerov (born 1968), Bulgarian footballer
- Yüksel Şanlı (born 1973), Turkish Olympic wrestler

== Surname ==
- Anıl Yüksel (born 1990), Turkish tennis player
- Atakan Yüksel (born 1985), Turkish wrestler
- Batu Han Yüksel (born 1999), Turkish weightlifter
- Burak Yacan Yüksel (born 1992), Turkish basketballer
- Burcu Yüksel (born 1990), Turkish high jumper
- Celil Yüksel (born 1998), Turkish footballer
- Damir Ibrić Yüksel (born 1984), Bosnian footballer
- Ece Yüksel (born 1997), Turkish actress
- Edip Yüksel (born 1957), Turkish American moderate religious reformer
- Ekrem Gökay Yüksel (born 1981), Turkish politician
- Gülistan Yüksel (born 1962), German politician
- Levent Yüksel (born 1964), Turkish singer-songwriter
- Mehmet Yuksel (born 1970), German footballer and manager
- Metin Yüksel (1958–1979), Turkish Islamist
- Mikail Yüksel (born 1982), Swedish politician
- Müjde Yüksel (born 1981), Turkish female basketball player
- Saadet Yüksel (born 1983), Turkish judge
- Serdar Yüksel (born 1973), German politician
- Şule Yüksel Şenler (1938–2019), Turkish journalist
- Turgut Yüksel (born 1978), German-Turkish politician (SPD)

== See also ==
- Yüksel, Dinar, village in Afyonkarahisar Province, Turkey
- Yüksel Tohumculuk, a Turkish plant breeding company based in Antalya
