= Kemal Şahin =

Turkish–German entrepreneur

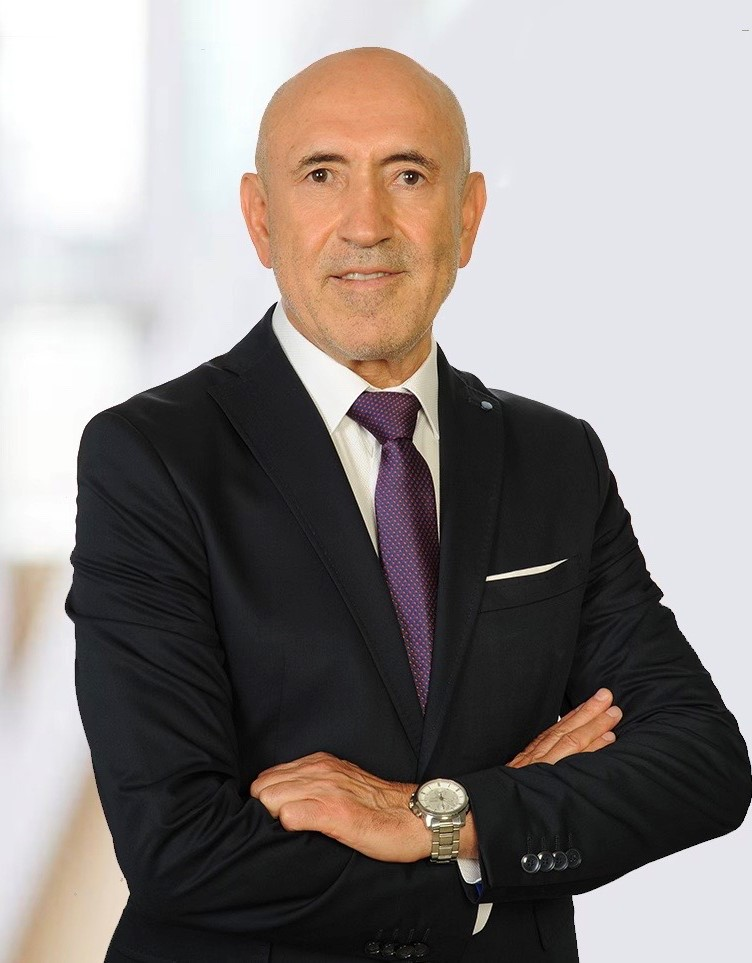
- Kemal Şahin
- Born: Konya Province, Turkey
- Education: RWTH Aachen University
- Occupation: businessman

Kemal Şahin is a Turkish–German entrepreneur, a textile tycoon, and founder and CEO of Şahinler Holding. He is also an environmental activist against erosion.

== Early life ==
Şahin (which means falcon in Turkish) was born to a poor family in the village of Taşlıpınar in the Beyşehir district of Konya Province, Turkey.

He finished primary school in his village, secondary school in Beyşehir and high school in Konya. Sahin then went to Germany on a scholarship in 1973, to study metallurgical engineering at RWTH Aachen University for Etibank, a large state-owned mining company. He completed a German-language course, then graduated in 1982, with a Diplom degree.

== Entrepreneur ==
As a student, Şahin was interested in trade. After finishing university, he established his own textile-importing company, Santex Moden, in 1982, with a starting capital of 5,000 DM. Part of the reason he started the company was to avoid deportation from Germany after he graduated. Within three or four years, he became a German millionaire before his 30th birthday.

Today, he owns 27 production and trading companies, integrated facilities from cotton to cloth, 18 of which are united under Şahinler Holding in Turkey. One of the biggest exporters in Turkey, the group also has its own steam and electric power station, a catering company, a building contractor and a holiday resort in Antalya Province, Turkey. The worldwide Şahinler corporation, with a turnover of one billion Euros, consists of two companies in Germany and one each in the Netherlands, Austria, France, Switzerland, Spain, Romania, Bulgaria, Slovenia, United Kingdom, the U.S., and Turkey. The group has about 10,000 employees. Santex Moden ranks 25th in Germany and is among the 100 largest companies in Europe.

Şahin also owns several hotels in the Antalya area through his company.

== Awards ==
- 1997 "Manager of the Year" by the Schitag Ernst & Young management consulting firm and by Manager magazine for entrepreneurial achievement.
- 1997 Germany "Businessman of the Year" Award
- 1998 "Honorary Investor of Europe" by the Club of Europe.
- 2000 Order of Merit of Turkey for his extraordinary activities, by President Süleyman Demirel.
- 2000 Honorary doctorate by the Selçuk University of Konya for his achievements in education.

== Other activities ==
Besides his entrepreneurship, Sahin has been:

- In 1987, the Şahinler Foundation was established to carry out activities in the fields of education, healthcare, and social services, to provide scholarships to high-achieving students, and to support individuals in need. Through the foundation, a number of schools have been constructed.
- President of the TEMA Foundation in Aachen, Germany, an international foundation fighting erosion and favoring restocking and nature conservation.
- Chairman of the Association of Turkish Businesspeople in Europe.
- Founder and chairman of the Turkish-German Association of Textile and Clothing.
- Chairman of the German-Turkish Chamber of Commerce.
- Honorary member of Euro-Türk (liberal Europe-Turkey alliance of friendship).
- Turkey–Germany representative of the World Turkish Business Council (DTİK) since 2023.

== Books ==
- Zirvedeki Şahin: Hayatım ve Fikirlerim (The Falcon at the Summit: My Life and My Thoughts) 2000, 280 pp., Autobiography in Turkish, ISBN 975-8243-90-X
- Der Falke in der Fremde (The Falcon Abroad) 2002, 240 pp., Autobiography in German, ISBN 3-430-17887-8
- Sıfırdan Zirveye: Radyodaki O Ses Hayatımı Değiştirdi (From Zero to the Summit: The Voice on the Radio Changed My Life) 2025, ISBN 978-625-418-354-6
