= Vilniaus viešasis transportas =

Vilniaus viešasis transportas may refer to:

- Trolleybuses in Vilnius
- Vilniaus autobusai
