= Mehmet Abbasoğlu (manager) =

Turkish and British business executive

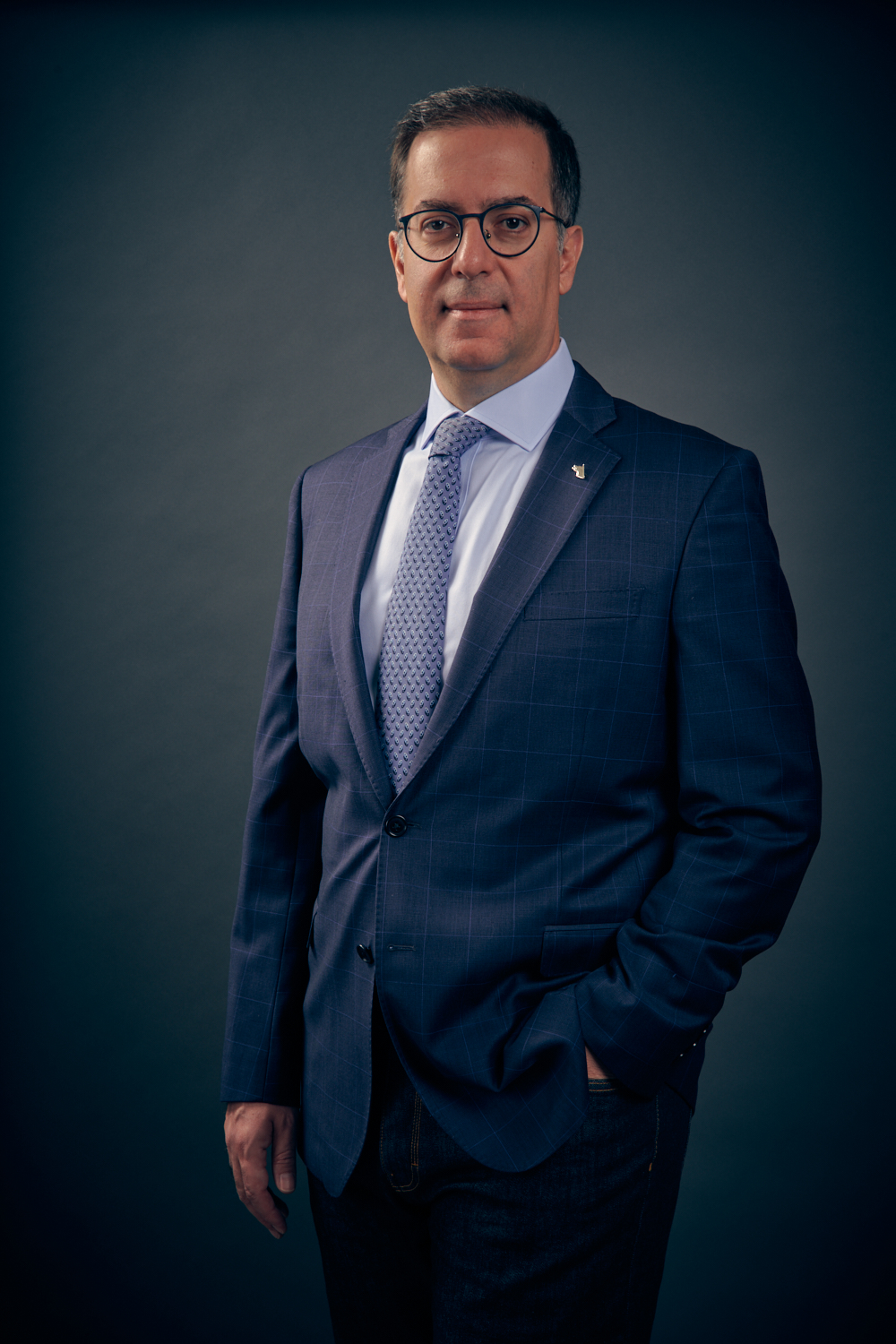
- Education: Macalester College (BA); Harvard Business School (MBA)
- Occupations: Business executive, CEO of Petrol Ofisi Grubu, president of the PETDER

Mehmet Abbasoğlu is a Turkish business executive, CEO and a board member of Petrol Ofisi Grubu, an energy infrastructure group in Turkey, president of the Petroleum, Industry, and E-Mobility Association (PETDER).

== Biography ==
He completed his studies at Macalester College, earning a bachelor's degree in mathematics, economics, and business from 1989 to 1992. He holds a Master of Business Administration (MBA) degree from Harvard Business School, which he obtained from 1994 to 1996.

Abbasoğlu began his career in 1992 as an investment banker at Dain Bosworth in the US. In 1996, he relocated from New York to London, where he continued his career as an associate executive and vice president at Merrill Lynch and Salomon Brothers International till 2002.

From 2002 to 2007, he was a director and advisor to the board at Turkcell and Çukurova Holding. Between 2007 and 2016, he was an executive director and managing director at J.P. Morgan, Macquarie Capital Advisers and Société Générale, respectively.

In 2016, Abbasoğlu joined Vitol, a global energy and commodity trading company, to oversee the acquisition process of Petrol Ofisi. Since September 2022, he has been the CEO and a board member of Petrol Ofisi Group, led and oversaw the process through which Petrol Ofisi acquired BP’s fuel operations in Turkey.

On April 17, 2025, Mehmet Abbasoğlu was elected as the new president of the Board of Directors of the Petroleum Industry and E-Mobility Association (PETDER) for the 2025–2027 term.

Abbasoğlu also is the chair of E-Power Enerji A.Ş., OfisFinans Finansman A.Ş., PO Finans ve Teknoloji A.Ş. and Rune Technologies Bilişim Hizmetleri A.Ş., all wholly owned subsidiaries of the Petrol Ofisi Group.

He is a collector of contemporary art, and a member of the board of directors of SAHA Association.
