= Buses in Vilnius =

Public bus transport system in Vilnius, Lithuania

Coordinates: 54°43′15″N 25°17′45″E

Vilnius Buses
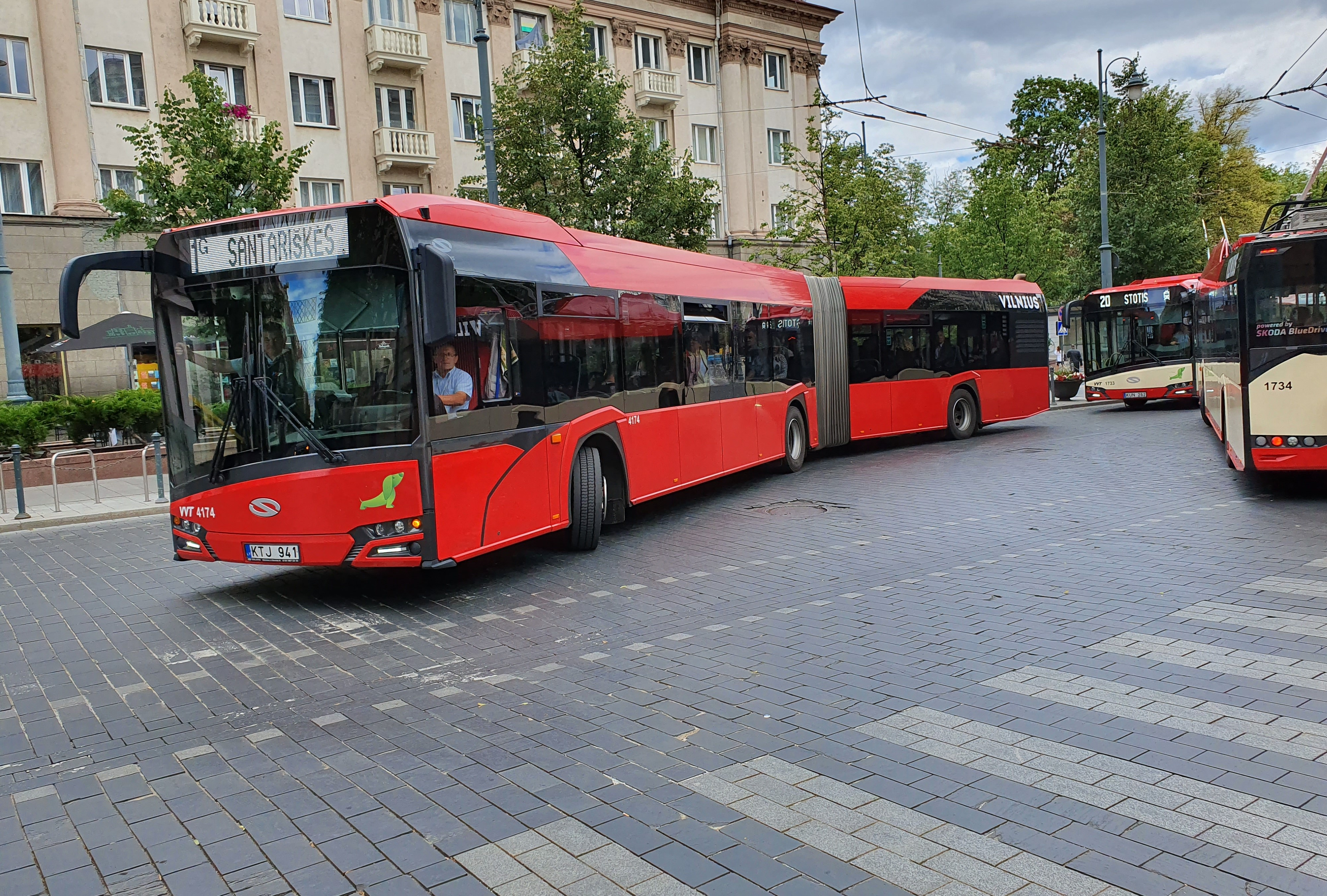
- Founded: 1945
- Headquarters: 52 Verkių gatvė
- Locale: Vilnius, Lithuania
- Service type: Bus service
- Routes: 81
- Daily ridership: 275,380
- Website: vilniausviesasistransportas.lt

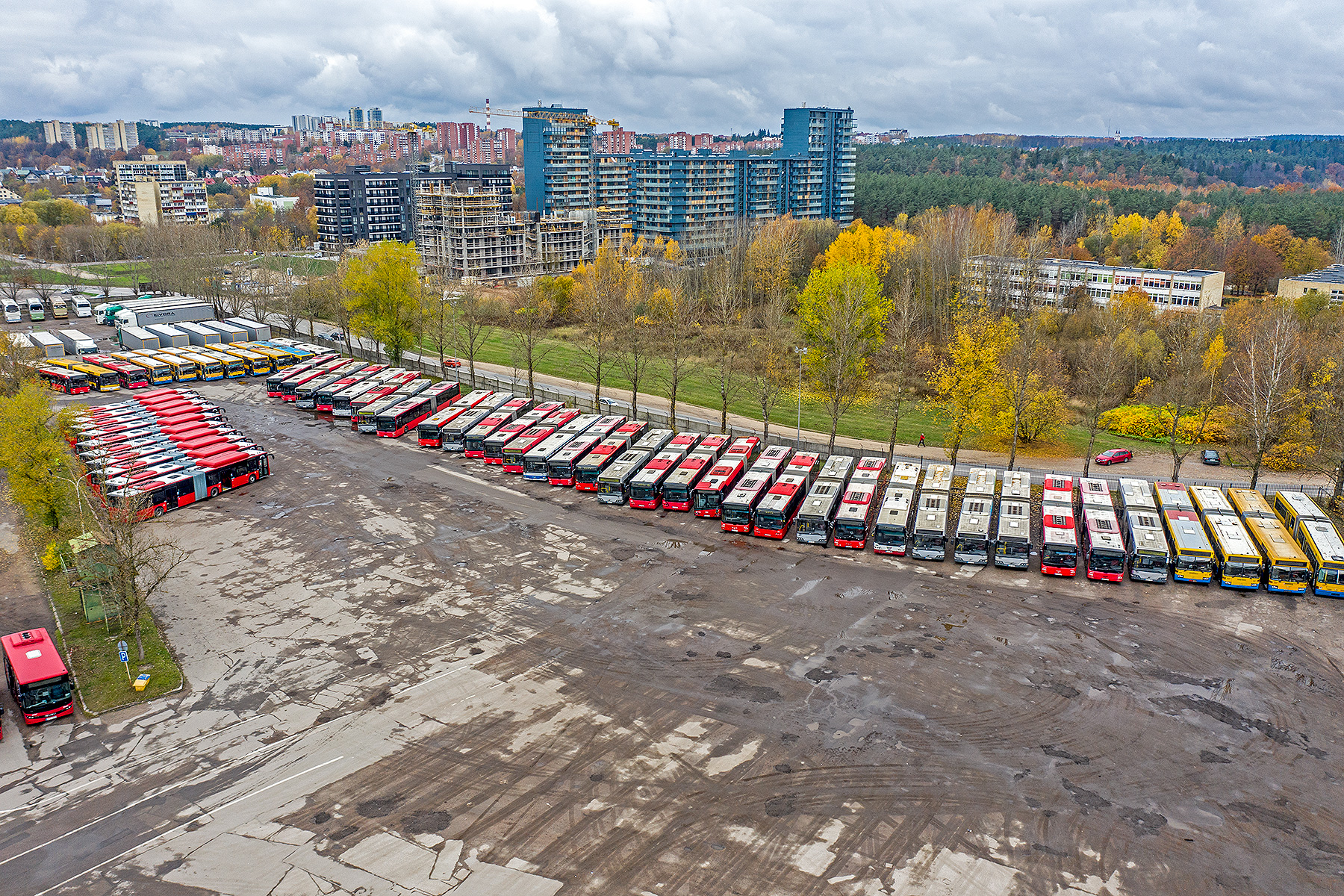
Bus depot

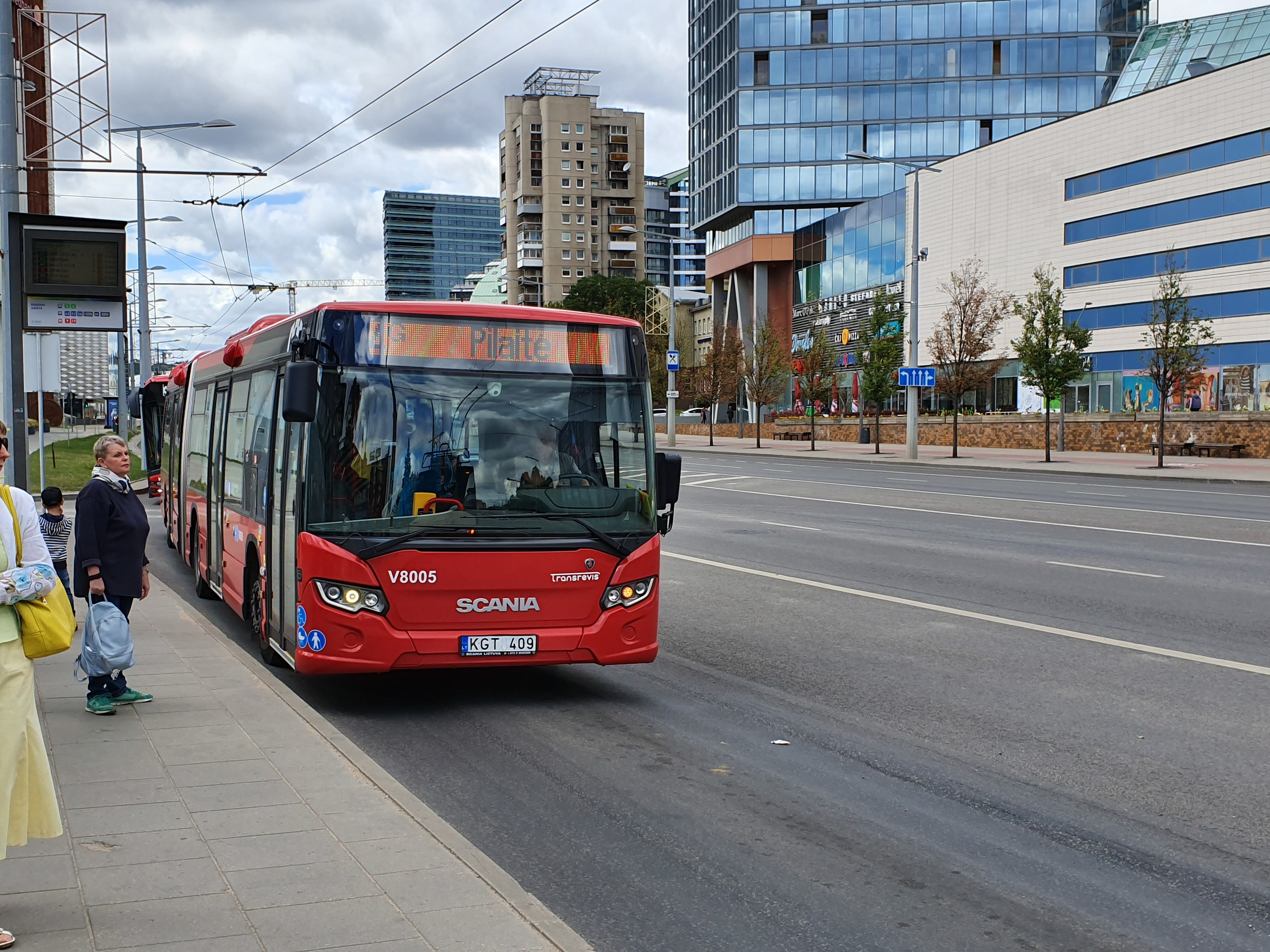
Scania Citywide LFA bus in Vilnius

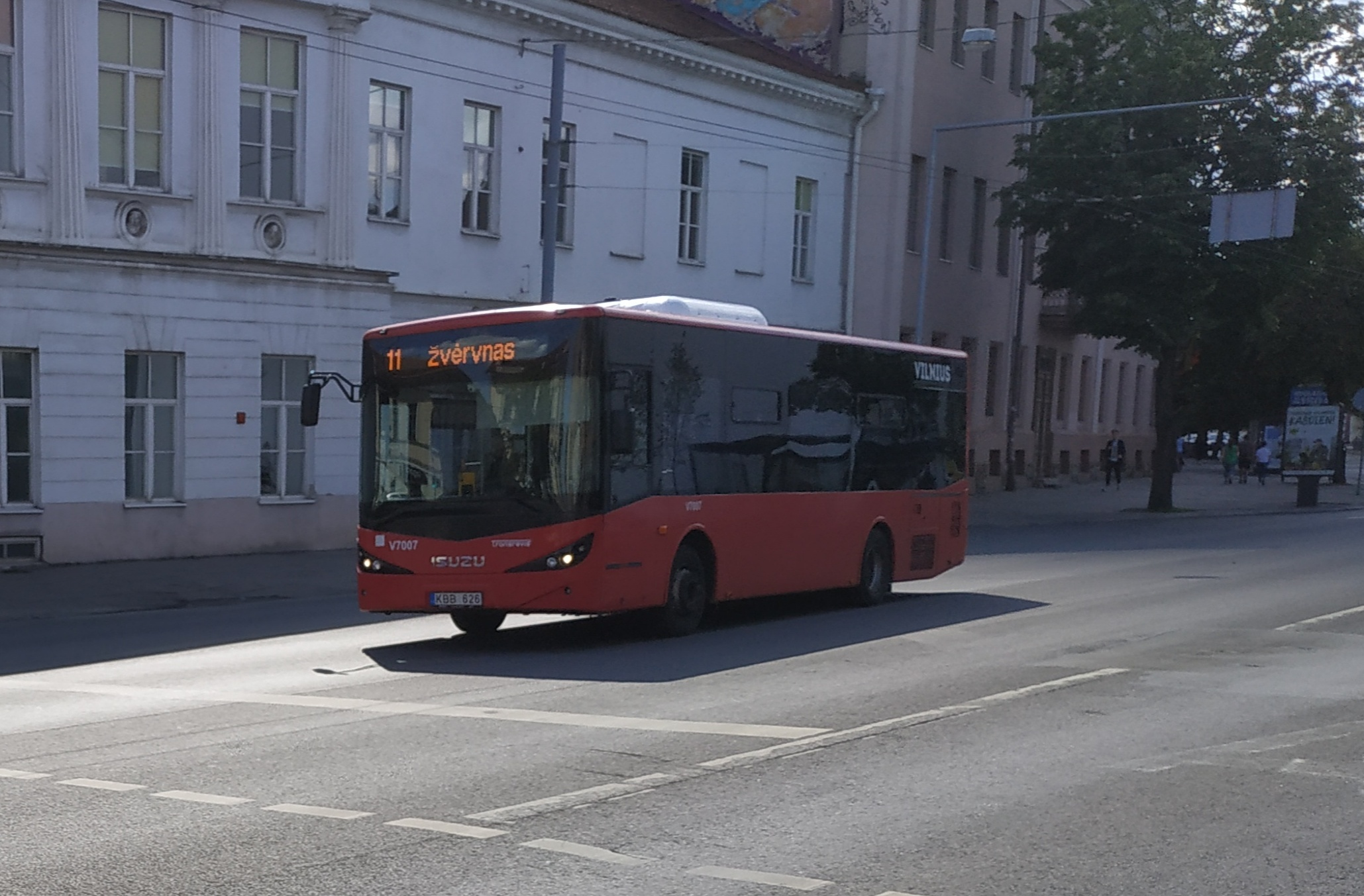
Bus in Vilnius, Anadolu Isuzu Citibus

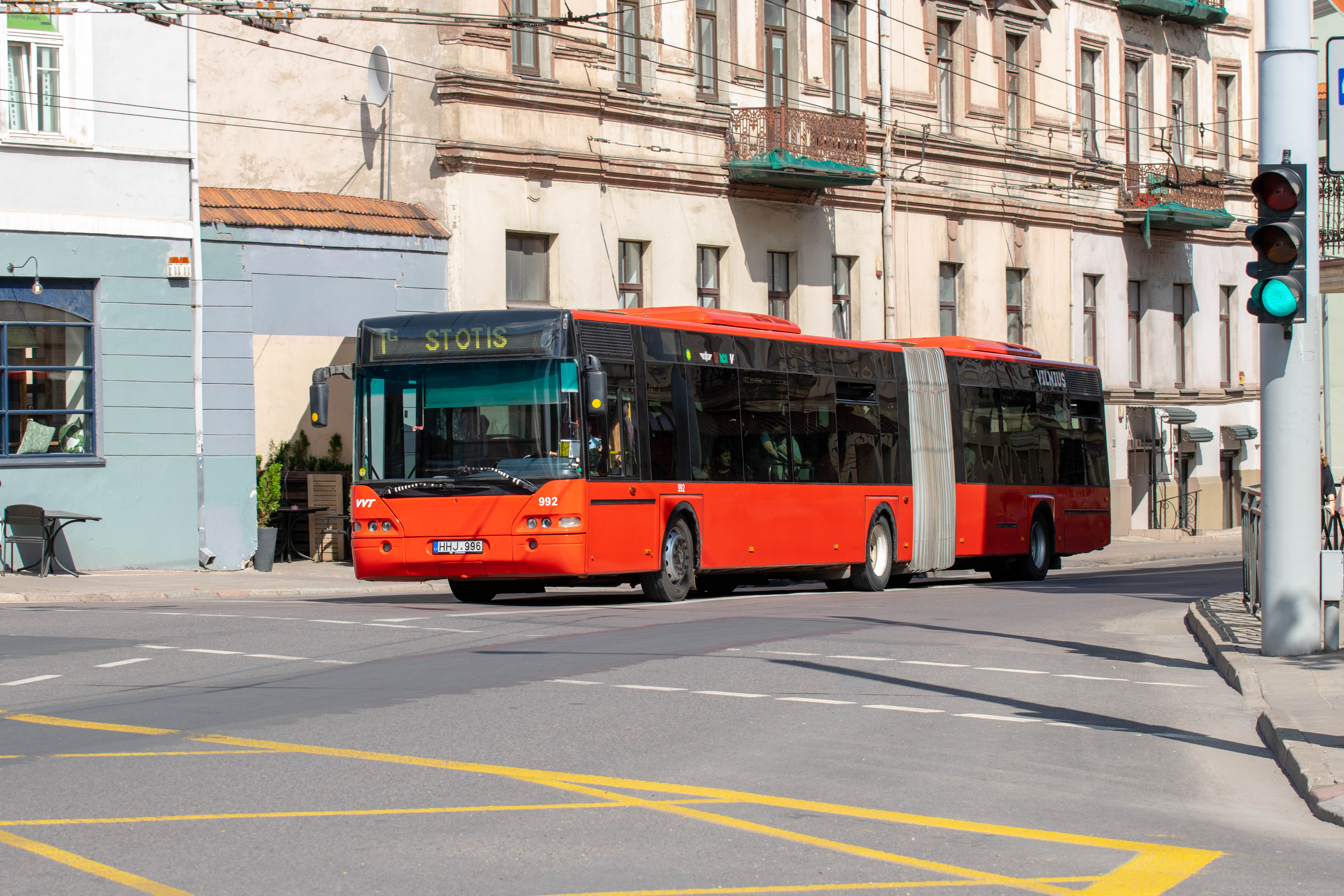
Bus in Vilnius, Neoplan Centroliner

The Vilnius bus network operates bus lines in Lithuanian capital city Vilnius. Up to 420 buses are working on working-days, 250 - on weekends.

== History ==
On November 18, 1945, the Vilnius Bus Company, which buspark was succeeded by 17 old German and Soviet military buses. On March 13, the new regular bus line Žvėrynas - Railway Station, after all, other two lines were opened.

In 1964, the new depot of the existing bus fleet was built in Verkių street.

In 1995, the company was registered as a limited liability company Vilniaus autobusų parkas.

In 2003, company was renamed to Vilniaus autobusai.

In 2004, 90 new Volvo 7700 and Volvo 7700A buses were bought.

In 2011 Vilniaus Autobusai was joined with the trolleybus company Vilniaus Troleibusai and reorganised to Vilniaus viešasis transportas.

After the 2013 bus and trolleybus route reform, selected buses were stored at the second trolleybus depot in Viršuliškės. Also, due to lack of minibuses after the said reform, 12 Koch minibuses were purchased second-hand from Jelgava.

In 2013 and 2014, 19 Solaris Urbino 12 III CNG, 18 MAN A21 Lion's City NL273 CNG and 20 Castrosua City Versus CNG buses were bought.

From 2014 to 2017, several bus routes were handed out to private operators Transrevis, Ridvija which operated minibus routes and Meteorit Turas.

In 2017, a bus renewal period started, which lasted until the end of 2020. Many old buses were scrapped, some older buses were repainted and many new ones were purchased. These include:

- 15 MAN A21 Lion's City NL273 and 15 MAN A23 Lion's City GL NG313 buses (second-hand from Oslo, which were originally built in 2008);
- 100 Solaris Urbino 12 IV buses;
- 50 Solaris Urbino 18 IV buses;
- 50 MAN A23 Lion's City G NG313 CNG buses;
- 10 Anadolu Isuzu Novo Citi Life buses;
- 5 Karsan Jest Electric buses.

The private operators Ridvija and Meteorit Turas no longer operated any routes though Transrevis was given even more of them and replaced its buses with new ones:

- 50 Scania Citywide LFA buses;
- 70 Anadolu Isuzu Citibus buses.

== List of operated buses ==
List of currently operated buses
Units	Bus model	Built in	Used since	Notes
100	Solaris Urbino 12 IV	2018	2018	
50	MAN A23 Lion's City G NG313 CNG	2020	2020	
50	Solaris Urbino 18 IV	2018	2018	
20	Castrosua City Versus CNG	2014	2014	
19	Solaris Urbino 12 III CNG	2013	2013	
18	MAN A21 Lion's City NL273 CNG	2013	2013	
15	MAN A21 Lion's City NL273	2008	2017	Second-hand
15	MAN A23 Lion's City GL NG313	2008	2017	Second-hand
10	Anadolu Isuzu Novo Citi Life	2019	2019	
9	Neoplan N4421/3 Centroliner	2000	2014	Second-hand
8	MAN A23 NG313	2000	2015	Second-hand
6	Fiat Ducato Maxi ALTAS	2011	2011	
5	Karsan Jest Electric	2019	2019	Electric
3	Mercedes-Benz Sprinter NOGE	2006	2013	Second-hand, currently not operating
2	Neoplan N4407 Centroliner	2000	2011	Second-hand
1	Castrosua Tempus Hybrid	2014	2014	Currently not operating

List of service buses
Units	Bus model	Built in	Notes
2	Citroen Jumper	2011	Used for transporting bus drivers, rarely carries passengers
2	VanHool A508	1988	Used for jumpstarting buses
1	Daewoo Lublin 3514	2000	Purpose not known
1	DAF MB200 HORTEN	1985	Used for towing broken-down vehicles
1	Mercedes-Benz O405N2	1995	The bus has mounted trolleybus connectors, they're used for removing snow from trolleybuses wires
1	Peugeot Boxer	2001	Used for transporting bus drivers, rarely carries passengers

List of formerly operated buses (Note: this list doesn't contain some old buses which were scrapped a long time ago)
Bus model	Built in	Used until	Notes
Berkhof Jonckheer-G	2000	2018	Second-hand, now operated as Vilnius Airport service buses.
Carrus K204 City L	1997	2018	Second-hand
Castrosua CS40	1995	2020	Second-hand
Mercedes-Benz 1117L Ernst Auwärter Clubstar	1986	2020	Second-hand, mainly service bus, rarely carried passengers
Heuliez GX217 CNG	1998	2015	Second-hand
Heuliez GX417 CNG	1999	2019	Second-hand
Karosa B732	1997	2018	
Karosa B741	1995	2018	
Karosa B841	1999	2018	One bus (the world's last Karosa B841) was transported to the Karosa museum in Prague
MAN A11 NG262	1997	2020	Second-hand
MAN A11 NG272	1994	2018	Second-hand
MAN A11 NG312	1998	2020	Second-hand
MAN A15 NL232 CNG	1997	2014	Second-hand
MAN A18 NG232 CNG	1996	2017	Second-hand
MAN A23 NG263	2000	2019	Second-hand
MAN A23 NG313 CNG	1998	2019	Second-hand
Mercedes-Benz O405	1986	2019	Second-hand
Mercedes-Benz O405G	1990	2020	Second-hand
Mercedes-Benz O405GN	1993	2020	Second-hand
Mercedes-Benz O405GN2	1995	2016	Second-hand
Mercedes-Benz O405GN2 CNG	1995	2016	Second-hand
Mercedes-Benz O405N2 CNG	1998	2016	Second-hand
Mercedes-Benz O405N2Ü CNG	1996	2016	Second-hand
Mercedes-Benz O520 Cito	1999	2017	
Mercedes-Benz O530 Citaro	2003	2020	
Neoplan N4021/3NF	1994	2018	Second-hand
Mercedes-Benz O405 Ramseier & Jenzer	1987	2018	Second-hand
Säffle 5000	1996	2018	Second-hand
Säffle System 2000	1996	2018	Second-hand
Karosa B832	1998	2018	Bus #302 stood in the depot until May 2022, when it was sold to a scrap metal company
Volvo 7700	2004	2024	
Volvo 7700a	2004	2024	

== Night bus ==
The night bus route network in Vilnius was designed in 2006 to allow a safe journey from the city centre to the most densely populated neighbourhoods. At first the routes operates on all nights, however due to financial crisis, they were discontinued. At first, all tickets were valid on night buses, but starting from December 2006, night tickets were introduced, which could be purchased on the bus and no discounts were valid. In 2015 night buses were brought back on Friday to Saturday and Saturday to Sunday nights. In 2018, route 88N was introduced to transport passengers between Vilnius airport and the city center. In 2020, due to COVID-19 pandemic, all night routes were discontinued, but 88N would be brought back the Summer of the same year. Other night routes were brought back in July 2022, it was an experiment to see if the ridership was big enough to resume operation, the final day of operation was September 4th. No further announcements were made regarding the change and the only regular night bus route in Vilnius is 88N. Rest of the night routes are only brought back for special events.

Night bus routes in Vilnius
Number	Route	Notes
88N	Airport–Center–Europe square	Introduced in 2018
101N	Saulėtekis–Žygimantų st.–Savanorių av.–Laisvės av.–Fabijoniškės	
102N	Pilaitė–Žvėrynas–Žygimantų st.–Maironio st.–Bus station	
103N	Santariškės–Didlaukio st.–Kalvarijų st.–Pylimo st.–Bus station–Gerosios Vilties st	
104N	Ateities st.–Žirmūnų st.–Pylimo st.–Naujininkai	
105N	Pašilaičiai–Šeškinė–Konstitucijos av.–Žygimantų st.–Olandų st.–Pavilnys–Parko st	
106N	Liepkalnis–Bus station–Pylimo st.–Green bridge (Žaliasis tiltas)	Only operated on 2014/07/04-05 and 2018/07/04-05
