= Arkem =

Arkem Chemicals
- Company type: Private
- Industry: Chemicals, petrochemicals, fuels and oils
- Founded: 1991
- Founder: Levend Kokuludağ
- Headquarters: Istanbul, Turkey
- Area served: Europe, Middle East, United States, Far East
- Key people: Levend Kokuludağ (President), Tezel Kökdemir (VP)
- Products: Solvents, Monomers, Alcohols, Aromatics, Aliphatics, Esters, Glycols, Glycol Ethers, Ketones, Surfactants, Acrylics, Acetyls, Ethanols, Isocyanates, Phosphates, Amines, Titanium dioxide
- Revenue: ▲US$380 million (2011)
- Website: http://www.arkem.com

Arkem Chemicals (Arkem Kimya Sanayi ve Ticaret A.Ş.) is a family-owned chemical distribution company based in Turkey. It was established in 1992 in Istanbul. The company sells approximately 230,000 metric tons of chemicals (2009) in various chemical product lines, including:

- Monomers
- Alcohols
- Aromatics & Aliphatics
- Esters
- Glycols
- Glycol Ethers
- Ketones
- Surfactants

Arkem is the 27th largest chemical distributor in its field (2010) according to "The Top 100 Chemical Distributors" by ICIS. 2009 sales $248m.

The company owns the Altintel Port and Tank Terminal, with a capacity of 60,000 cubic meters of storage area in Kocaeli/Gebze, Dilovası area. It is supplied by international chemical producing companies such as:

- Millenium Petrochemicals USA (a Lyondell Company)
- BP Chemicals Ltd., UK
- Eastman Chemicals USA
- Arkema, France
- Petrogal S.A., Portugal
- Sasol Solvents, South Africa
- Sasol Surfactants, Germany & Italy
- Shell Chemicals, Europe
- Ineos, UK
- Kuraray, Japan

== Related companies ==
- Altintel Port and Tank Terminal (Altıntel Liman ve Terminal İşletmeleri A.Ş.)
- Gökbil Logistics (Gökbil Nakliyat ve Depolama)
- Gökbil Tank Container
- Arkem Industrial
- Arkem Europe
- Arkem China
- Arkem USA
- Arkem Germany

== See also ==
- List of companies of Turkey
