= Solimpeks =

Solimpeks Solar Corp.
- Company type: Private company
- Founded: 2001
- Headquarters: Konya, Turkey
- Products: Solar thermal collectors Photovoltaic thermal hybrid solar collector
- Number of employees: 120
- Subsidiaries: Solimpeks Solar GmbH; Soliren Ltd. Seiso Ltd.
- Website: Solimpeks Solar Corp; Solimpeks Solar GmbH

Solimpeks is a Turkish company dedicated to manufacture and market solar thermal and photovoltaic thermal hybrid solar collectors worldwide. The company's broader product line is exported to 60 countries, with European Union countries comprising about 70% of sales.

Solimpeks PV-T products are the first hybrid panels which are listed on the Microgeneration Certification Scheme. Solar keymark, CE mark are one of the 22 certificates owned by the company.

== History ==
The father company of Solimpeks was founded in 1979 as the first solar thermal collector manufacturer in Turkey. In 2001, the third generation started their own business with a broader view and achieved 100% growth yearly between 2004 and 2008. The new hybrid panels of Solimpeks were awarded "Alex's Cool Product of the Week" by Building Green and "Green Heroes Award" by Channel 4.

== Facilities ==
Solimpeks employs many specialized workers in the enterprise's units located in Konya (headquarters), Munich, Bavaria, Germany and Sevilla, Spain.

Solimpeks opened its first foreign branch office in Bavaria, because of the high demand for solar systems in Bavaria and Baden-Württemberg.

Solimpeks has sales offices in 60 countries.

== See also ==
- List of photovoltaics companies
- List of companies of Turkey
