= Aksa (company) =

Turkish company

- Founded: 1968; 58 years ago in Yalova, Turkey
- Headquarters: Yalova, Turkey
- Revenue: US$840.68 million (2023)
- Operating income: US$92 million (2023)
- Net income: US$57 million (2023)
- Total assets: US$877 million (2023)
- Total equity: US$587 million (2023)
- Website: aksa.com

Aksa (Turkish: Aksa Akrilik Kimya Sanayi A.Ş.) is a Turkish company manufacturing carbon fiber, natural white and solution dyed acrylic staple fiber, tow and tops for yarn spinning and nonwovens. Established in 1968 in Yalova, Turkey, the company is the world's largest producer of Acrylic fiber under one roof, with an annual production capacity of 308,000 tons.

Aksa is listed on the Istanbul Stock Exchange. Together with Dow Chemical, the DowAksa joint venture was established in 2012 to produce carbon fibers. The company was given the Environment Award of 2005 by Istanbul Industrial Association (İSO). This was considered ironic by some because of the company's controversial past with a large environmental disaster.

== Greenhouse gas emissions ==
In 2022 scope 1 emissions were 1.2 million tonnes CO2eq, partly from generating 3.4 TWh of electricity by burning coal.

== Controversies ==
=== 1999 Acrylonitrile spill ===
Approximately, 6500 tons of acrylonitrile leaked from an industrial polymer plant owned by Aksa Akrilik, due to pipes of storage units rupturing from the impact of the violent 17 August earthquake. Over 5000 people were affected, and the exposed animals had died. The leak was only noticed by Aksa 8 hours after the incident. Healthcare workers did not know about the health effects of acrylonitrile and tried to treat the victims with painkillers and IV fluids. One lawyer, Ayşe Akdemir, sued the company with 44 families as the plaintiffs. Aksa Akrilik was sued by 200 residents who were affected by acrylonitrile, a known human carcinogen. As of 2001, this is the largest acrylonitrile leak known.

==== Aftermath ====
Acrylamide, a decomposition production of acrylonitrile, was detected in the seawater, months after the disaster. The catalyst 2,2'-Azobis(2-methylpropionitrile), with the solvents dimethylformamide, dimethylacetamide, dimethylsulfoxide and dimethylsulphone were detected in the sea waters of the affected area. Chloroform of unknown origin was also detected. Some of these compounds are toxic to the aquatic life.

In 2003, Selçuk Ergin, the manager of Aksa Akrilik at the time of the incident, has died from lung cancer related to acrylonitrile exposure. An increase in cancer cases in the area was confirmed by the Turkish Medical Association, as the cancer rate in the affected area has increased by 80%, from 1999 to April 2002.

=== 2013 Fire ===
In January 2013, a polyacrylonitrile (PAN) fibre storage set on fire. The fire was not responded quickly and the toxic fumes spread. The combustion products included hydrogen cyanide. No deaths or injuries were reported.

== See also ==
- List of companies of Turkey
