= Dilek Ecza Deposu =

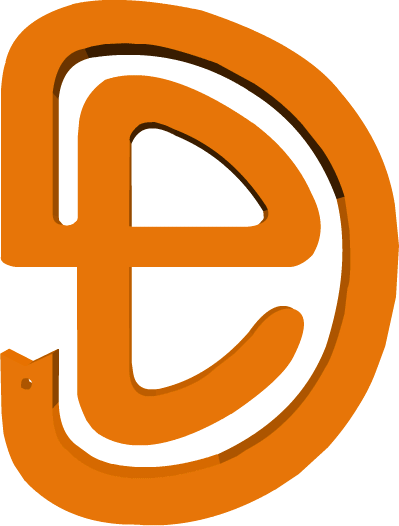
- Company type: Pharmaceutical Company
- Industry: Healthcare
- Founded: September 15, 1991
- Headquarters: Antalya, Turkey
- Key people: Mr. M.Zeki Taşçı (Founding Chairman), Mrs. Dilek Taşçı (Founder), Mr. Burak Taşçı (CEO)
- Products: Pharmaceuticals
- Revenue: US$200M
- Number of employees: 600
- Website: www.dilekecza.com.tr

Dilek Ecza Deposu is the fifth largest-pharmaceutical warehouse in Turkey with US$200 million net sales figure as of December 31, 2009. Dilek Ecza provides pharmaceuticals warehouse services as a distribution channel between drug companies and hospitals and pharmacies. It operates 20 domestic branches throughout Turkey.

== Background ==
Dilek Ecza was founded as a privately owned pharmaceutical warehouse in Antalya in 1991. Starting from 1993, it started to sell imported drugs within the Mediterranean and Aegean Region in Turkey via its branches. In 2001, the company has reached 21 branches throughout the western part of Turkey. Today, the company is serving to 10,000 pharmacies within 5 distinct geographic regions in Turkey.

== See also ==
- List of companies of Turkey
