= Altintel =

Coordinates: 40°46′4″N 29°32′26″E

Altintel Tank Terminal ( Altıntel Liman ve Terminal İşletmeleri A.Ş.)
- Company type: Private
- Industry: Chemicals, petrochemicals, fuels and oils,
- Founded: 1987 Istanbul, Turkey
- Founder: İsmet Aktar (1952-1993)
- Headquarters: Istanbul, Turkey
- Area served: Turkey
- Products: Solvents, Monomers, Alcohols, Aromatics, Aliphatics, Esters, Glycols, Glycol Ethers, Ketones, Surfactants, Acrylics, Acetyls, Ethanols, Isocyanates, Phosphates, Amines, Titanium dioxide
- Number of employees: 40-80
- Website: http://www.altintel.com.tr

Altıntel Port ( Altıntel Tank ve Terminal İşletmeleri A.Ş.) is a tank terminal and port located in Kocaeli/GEBZE, Dilovası OSB Organized Industrial Zone of Turkey.

- It was established in 1987 for the storage of liquid chemical materials.
- Its primary customer is Arkem Chemicals, who started renting storage tanks in 1990's and took over the company in 2008.

== Info ==
Dimensions:

- 60,000 m^{3} storage area in 53 tanks.
- 120,000 m^{2} owned land in Dilovası Organized Industrial Zone
- 250 m long jetty.
