= Isuzu Turquoise =

Isuzu Turquoise/Turkuaz
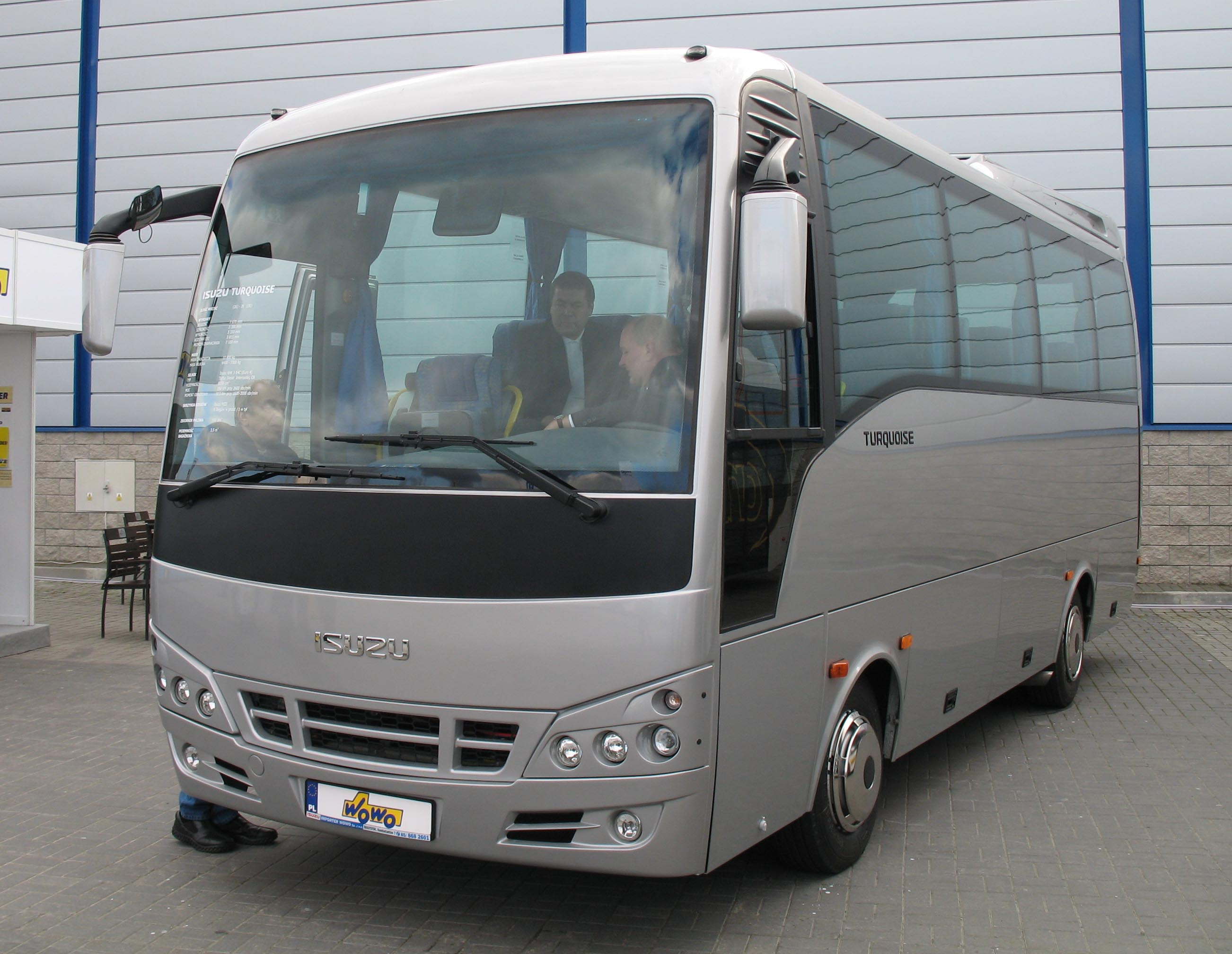
- Isuzu Turquoise

Overview
- Manufacturer: Isuzu
- Assembly: Anadolu Isuzu

Body and chassis
- Doors: 1 door or 2 doors
- Floor type: Step entrance
- Chassis: Isuzu N-Series

Powertrain
- Engine: 5.2 L 4HK1E6C I4
- Capacity: 26-capacity 31-capacity
- Power output: 190 PS (140 kW; 187 hp), 510 N⋅m (376 lb⋅ft)
- Transmission: Manual / AMT

Dimensions
- Length: 8.8m to 9.1m
- Width: 2.4m
- Height: 3.4m

The Isuzu Turquoise, known as Turkuaz (Turkish pronunciation: [ˈtuɾkuaz]) in Turkey, is a 26/31 seater intercity midibus produced by Anadolu Isuzu. For the 31 seater, it was renamed the Euro Turquoise. It comes with a length of 7.7 m (25 ft), and has a gross vehicle weight (GVW) of 10.4 t. It is powered by the 5.2L 4HK1E6C engine that produces 190 hp and 510 Nm of torque. The standard transmission is an Isuzu MZZ-6 6-speed manual while the NESS 6-speed automated manual became available as an option.

Isuzu Turquoise has been sold to many countries, including Morocco.

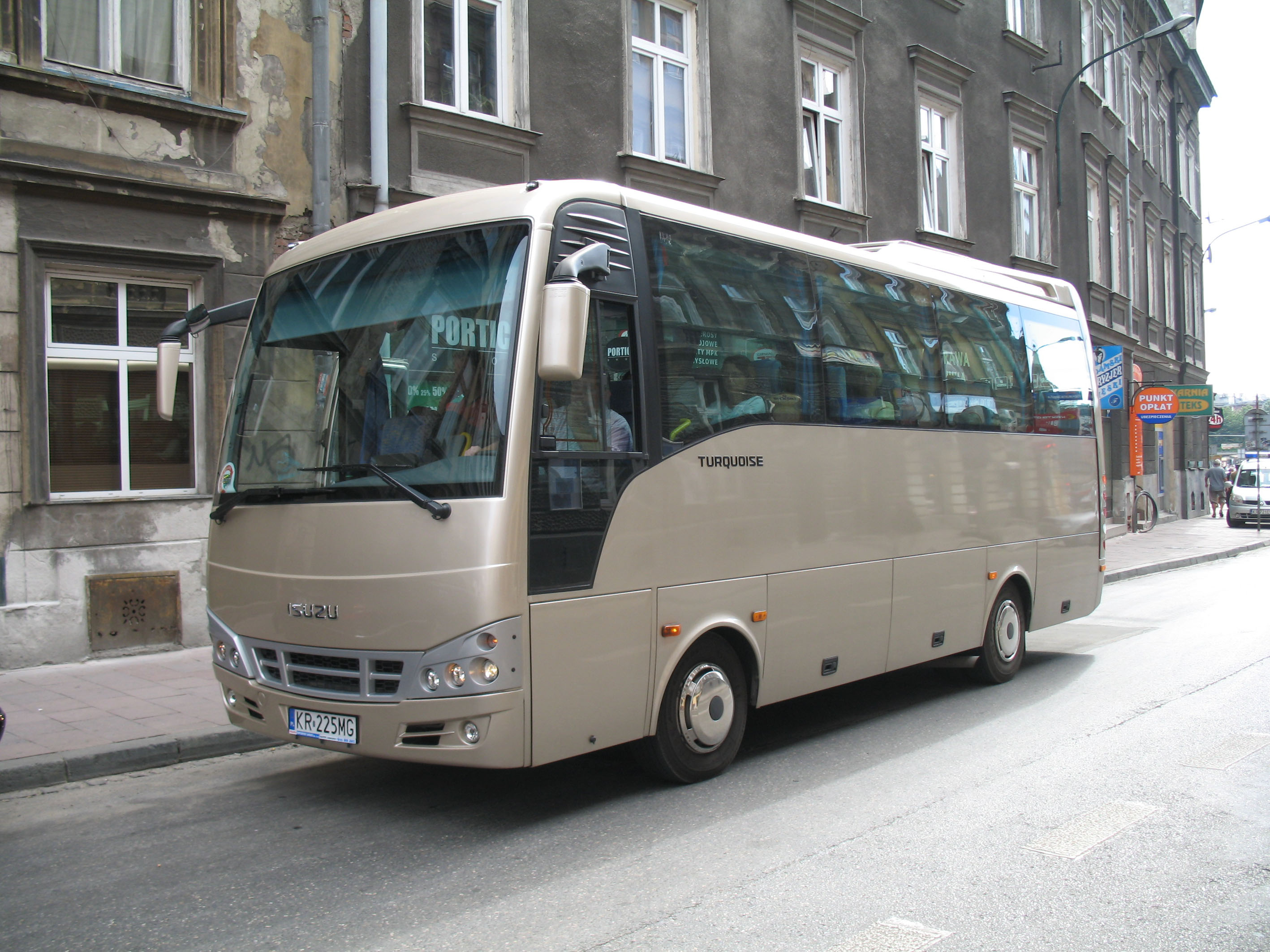
Isuzu Turquoise in Kraków

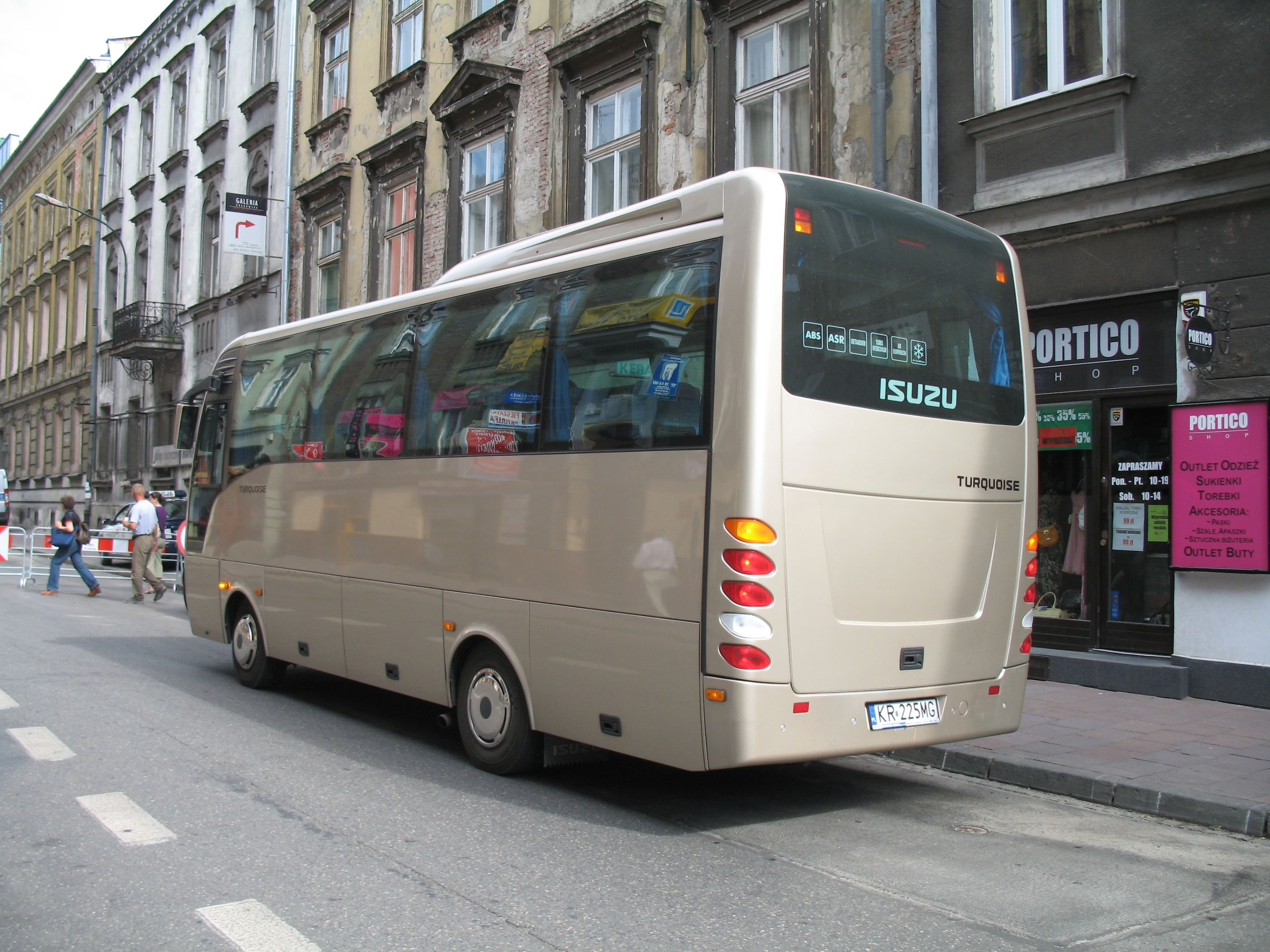
Isuzu Turquoise in Kraków

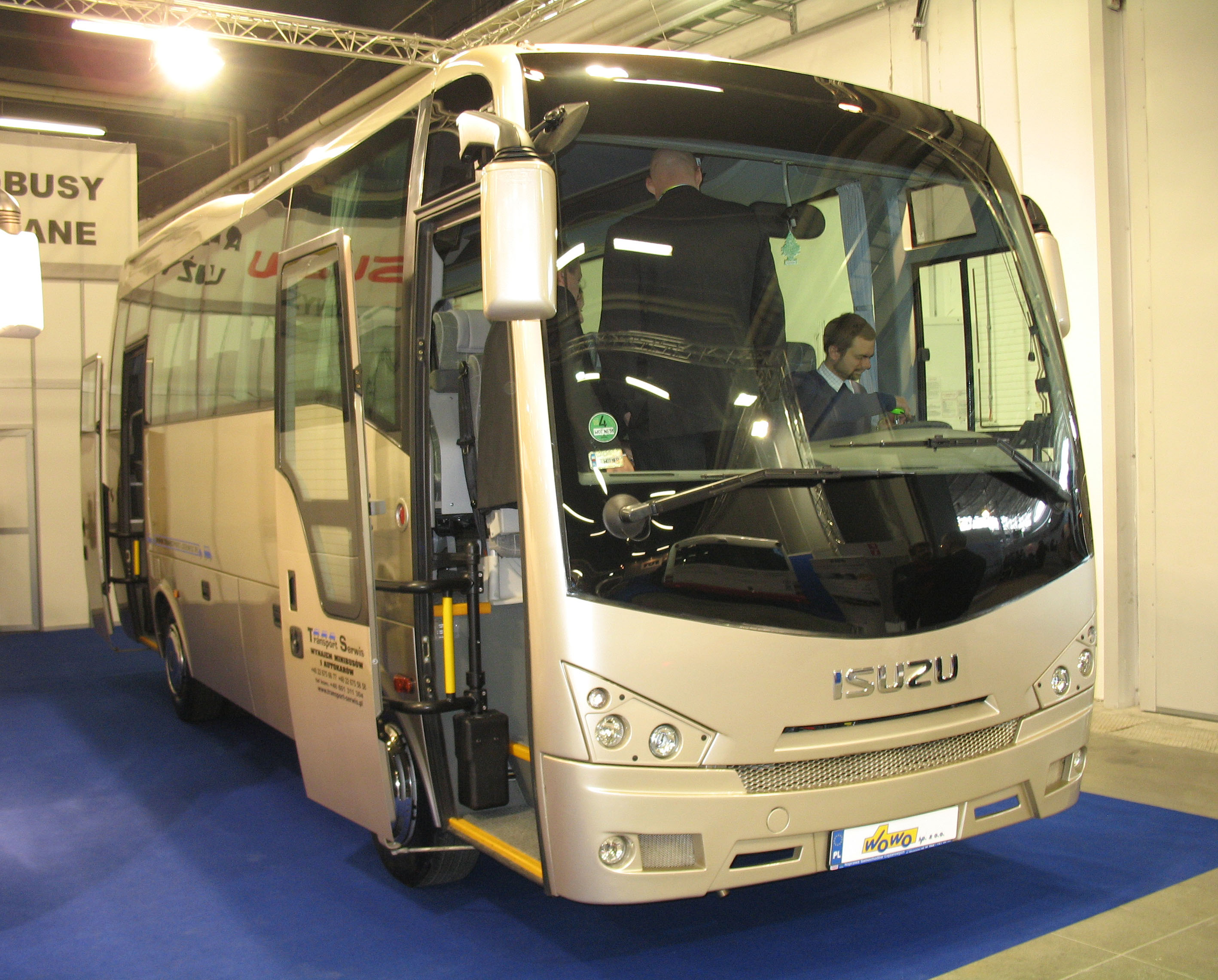
Isuzu Turquoise at Trans expo 2010
