= Petrol Ofisi =

Fuel products distribution and lubricants company

Petrol Ofisi A.Ş.
- Company type: Anonim Şirket
- Traded as: BİST: PTOFS
- Industry: Oil and gas
- Founded: 1941; 85 years ago
- Founder: Government of Turkey
- Headquarters: Ünalan, Istanbul
- Area served: Turkey
- Key people: Mehmet Abbasoğlu (CEO)
- Products: Petroleum, natural gas, lubricants
- Services: Service stations
- Revenue: ▲€ 11.03 billion (2023)
- Number of employees: 1,020
- Parent: Vitol
- Subsidiaries: List: Erk Petrol Marmara Depoculuk PO Gaz İletim PO Georgia PO Akdeniz Rafinerisi PO Arama Üretim Maxima
- Website: petrolofisi.com.tr

Petrol Ofisi A.Ş. is a fuel products distribution and lubricants company in Turkey. It is owned by the Dutch Vitol Group. Vitol completed its acquisition of Petrol Ofisi from OMV AG in June 2017.

Petrol Ofisi had 1,900 fuel stations in 2022 in Turkey.

== History ==
It was established on February 18, 1941, as a state-owned enterprise to import, stock, refine and distribute petroleum products. It became a joint stock company in 1983.

On July 24, 2000, the company was privatized, and initially 51% of the shares were purchased by Doğan Holding. On March 13, 2006, the Austrian petroleum company OMV bought 34% of the stake for US$1.054 billion. After this stock exchange, the share of Doğan Group decreased from 86.7% to 52.7%. On October 22, 2010 OMV announced that it will buy 54.17% shares from the Doğan Holding for the sum of EUR 1 Billion, setting its total stake in the company to 95.75%. The transaction remained subject to approval by relevant authorities until December 22, 2010, when it was completed.

Within the scope of the agreement signed between Petrol Ofisi and Chevron Brands International in 2021, Texaco started the production of mineral oil products.

== Sponsorships ==
Petrol Ofisi has acted as the main sponsor of the Formula One Turkish Grand Prix in 2006–2008. In addition, it has sponsored the Fisichella Motor Sport team in the GP2 Series in 2006–2007.

== See also ==
- Enerco Energy
