= Burak Yacan Yüksel =

Turkish basketball player

No. 11 – Aliağa Petkim
- Position: Forward
- League: Turkish Basketball League

Personal information
- Born: March 9, 1992 (age 34) Turkey
- Listed height: 6 ft 8 in (2.03 m)
- Listed weight: 220 lb (100 kg)

Career information
- Playing career: 2010–present

Career history
- 2010–2011: Anadolu Efes
- 2012–present: Aliağa Petkim

Burak Yacan Yüksel (born 9 March 1992, Turkey) is a Turkish basketball player. He currently plays in the power forward and small forward positions for Aliağa Petkim and he grew up from Anadolu Efes S.K.'s youth academy named "First Step With Efes". He is a future-talented basketball player.
