= EUROTAI =

Turkish defense industry joint venture

- Company type: Joint venture
- Industry: Defense; Technology; Software; Aerospace
- Headquarters: Turkey

EUROTAI is a joint venture between Turkish Aerospace Industries (TAI) and Eurocopter (later known as Airbus Helicopters). The venture agreement was signed in February 1997 and was worth FF4.45 billion (approximately US$450 million), under which TAI would produce the Eurocopter Super Puma and Cougar under licence in Turkey.

Known as PHENIX 2, the contract covers the supply of 10 Cougar helicopters for the need of the Turkish Land Forces and additionally of 20 helicopters for the Search and Rescue (SAR) and Combat SAR (CSAR) missions of the Turkish Air Force.

TAI is responsible for manufacturing and building the airframe, assembling the helicopters and performing the acceptance tests. The first AS 532 UL Cougar helicopter was delivered to the Turkish Air Force for CSAR operations officially in May 2000. The number of in-Turkey manufactured helicopter deliveries to the Turkish Armed Forces reached to 27 in September 2002. The order for manufacturing of 30 helicopters was completed at the end of that year.
