= Anadolu Isuzu =

Turkish joint venture automobile company

Anadolu Isuzu Otomotiv Sanayi ve Ticaret A.Ş.
- Type: Private
- Traded as: BİST: ASUZU
- Industry: Manufacturing
- Founded: 1984; 42 years ago
- Headquarters: Çayırova, Kocaeli, Turkey
- Key people: Tuncay Özilhan (Chairman); Mehmet Kamil Eser (Pres.); Tuğrul Arıkan (GM)
- Products: Pickup trucks; trucks; buses; Minibuses
- Revenue: ▲US$523 million (2023)
- Operating income: ▲US$28.1 million (2023)
- Net income: ▲US$55.6 million (2023)
- Total assets: ▲US$658 million (2023)
- Total equity: ▲US$284 million (2023)
- Owner: Anadolu Group; Isuzu
- Number of employees: 6,000
- Website: isuzu.com.tr

Anadolu Isuzu (officially Anadolu Isuzu Automotive Industry & Trading A.Ş.) is a joint venture company based in Istanbul, Turkey. It is the collaboration between Anadolu Group, Isuzu, Itochu and HICOM. Its main fields of operation are the production and marketing of light duty trucks and midibuses. Since the establishment of the company in 1984, more than 80,000 commercial vehicles have been produced in accordance with the Isuzu Motors license agreement. Anadolu Isuzu is the first Turco-Japanese joint venture in the automotive sector.

The experience and know-how of Anadolu Isuzu dates back to the Çelik Montaj, which was established in 1965 to build pick-ups and motorcycles. The company continued to produce Škoda pickups until the end of 1986. In 1984, the company started to produce Isuzu vehicles in Istanbul Kartal Plants.

In 1999, Anadolu Isuzu has moved to the new Gebze Şekerpınar facilities, in the Çayırova district of Kocaeli. The new facilities were established over a land of 230,000 m^{2} where the company employs nearly 750 people. The facilities include two separate plants for truck and bus manufacturing. The midibus manufacturing plant alone covers an area of 21,750 m2 and has a production capacity of 4,000 midibuses per year.

== Performance ==
In 2004, Anadolu Isuzu has celebrated the 20th anniversary of the first Isuzu vehicle rolled off the production line in Turkey. Since 1984, more than 80,000 Isuzu vehicles have been produced in Kartal and Sekerpinar facilities. Nearly 100,000 Isuzu vehicles have been sold in the local market. In the last decade, nearly 7,000 vehicles produced in Anadolu Isuzu facilities have been exported.

By the end of 2005, Anadolu Isuzu was the largest midibus producer in Turkey, which also made the company one of the leading manufacturers in Europe. In the same year, Anadolu Isuzu was the best-selling midibus producer in the internal market. Anadolu Isuzu was also the largest midibus exporting company in Turkey, in 2005. The company exports 26/31-seat Euro Turquoise and 27-seat Roybus midibuses to nearly 15 countries in Europe.

== Product range ==
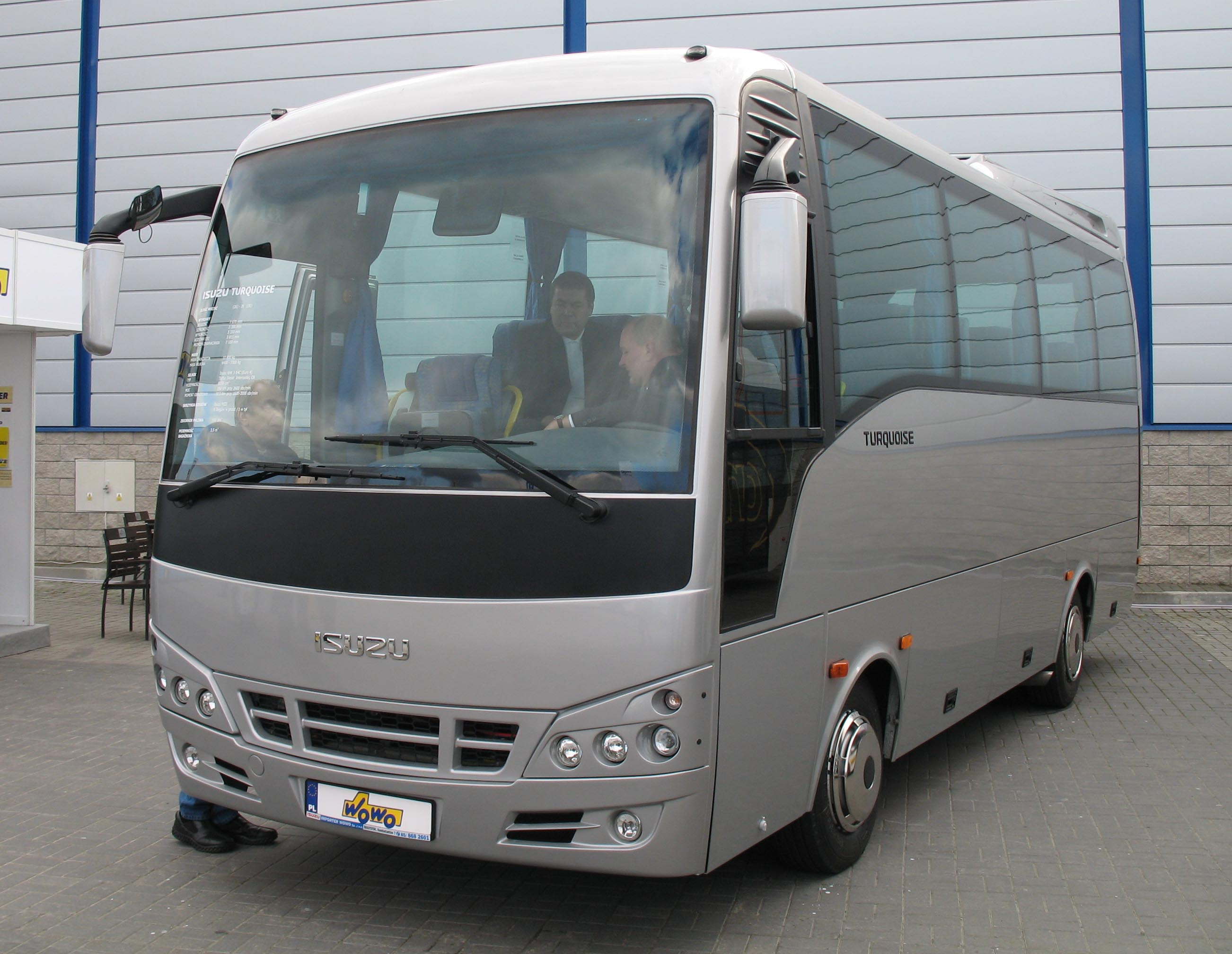
Isuzu Turquoise

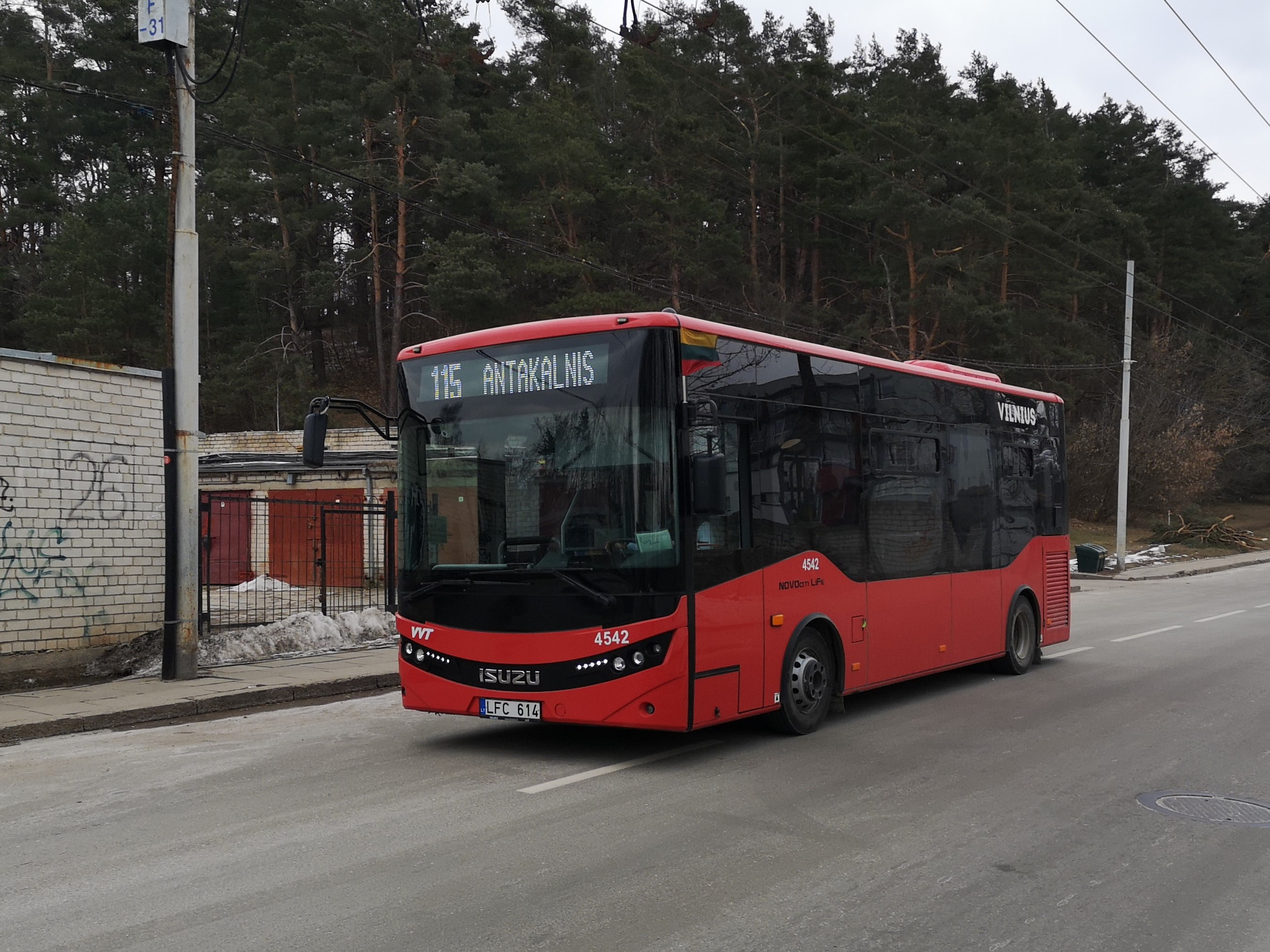
Isuzu Novo Citi Life

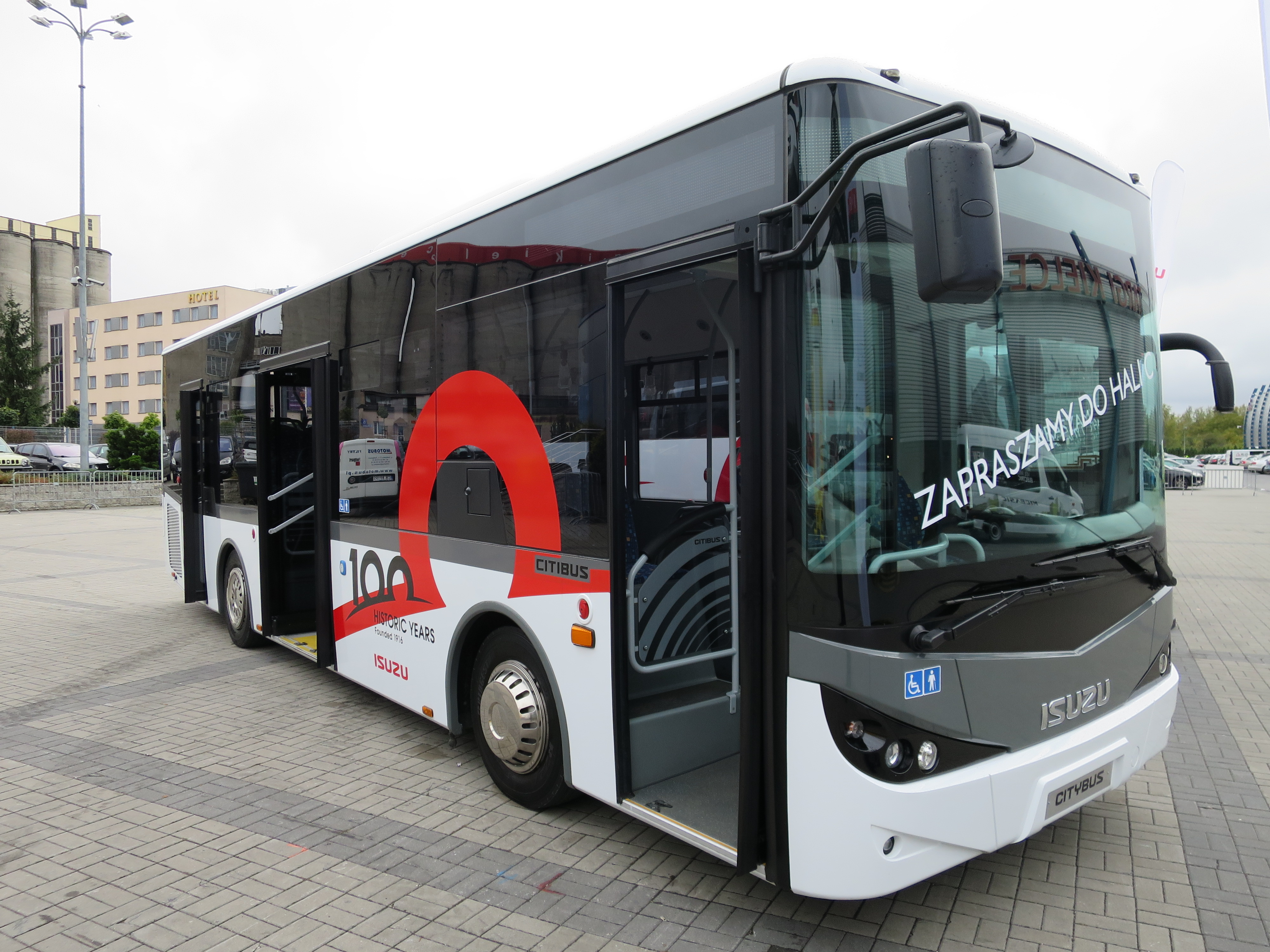
Isuzu Citibus

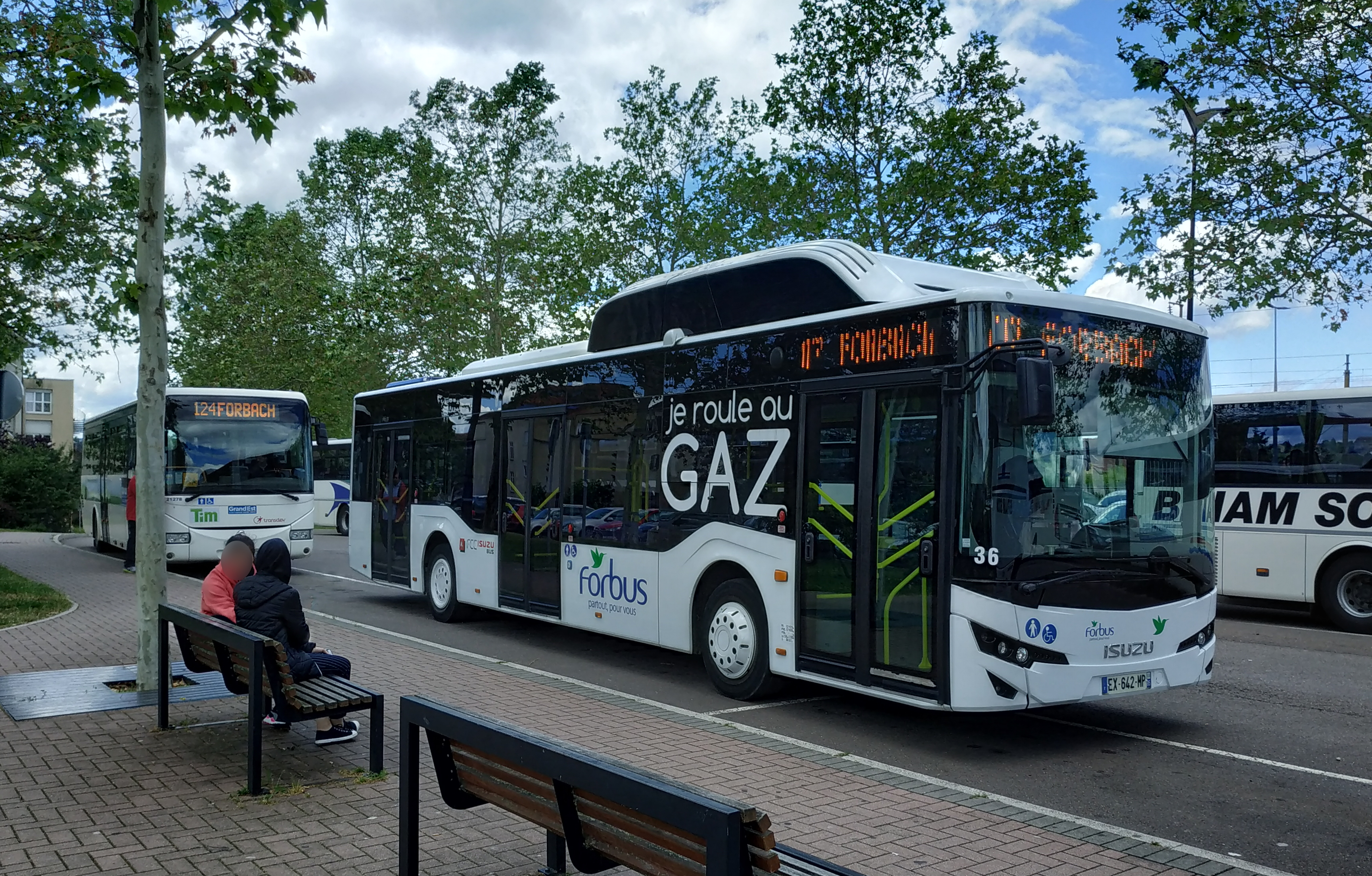
Isuzu Citiport CNG

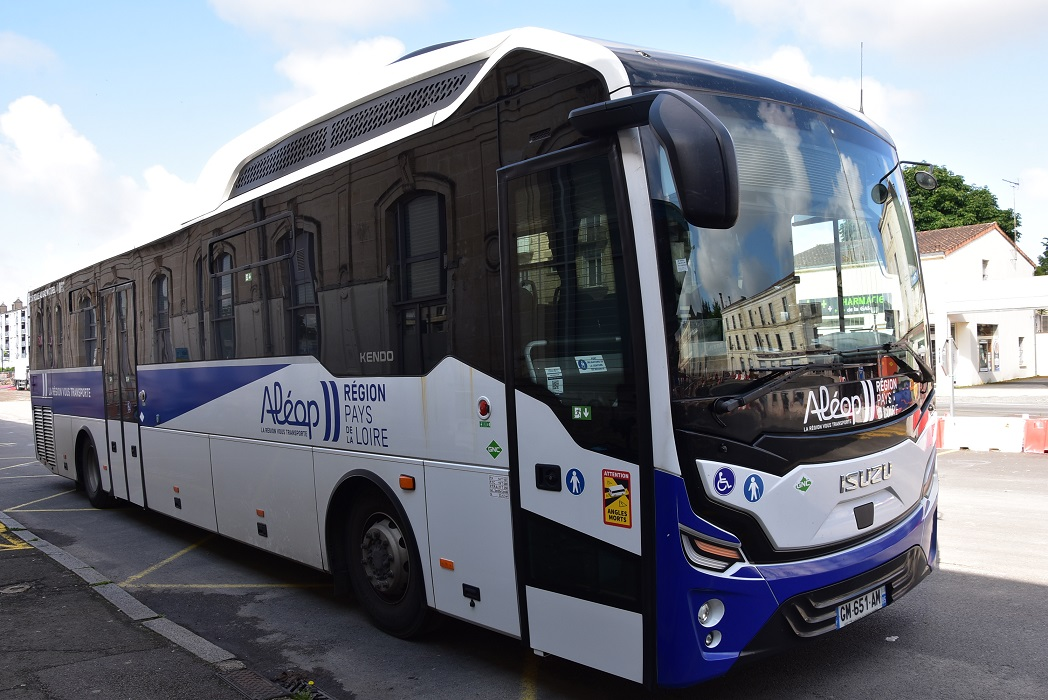
Isuzu Kendo 13 CNG

Light and medium duty truck models feature elongated chassis option and bigger front bumper than global models. Over 10 tonner trucks and all buses equipped with Wabco dual circuit full air brake system. Except Citiport bus, the entire range is powered by Isuzu engines, which are Euro 5/EEV compliant for local market, and Euro 2 to Euro 6 compliant for export.

=== Pickup trucks ===
- D-Max (4x4) - Double cab with manual and automatic transmission options
- D-Max (4x2) - Double and single cab options

=== Light trucks ===
- NLR (3.5 tons)
- N-Wide (3.5 tons) - Locally developed wide cab variant of NLR for local market

=== Trucks ===
- FSR "Tora" (16 tons)
- NPR 3D (12.5 tons) - Features liftable third beam axle
- NPR 10 (10 tons)
- NPR 8 (8 tons)

=== Midibuses ===
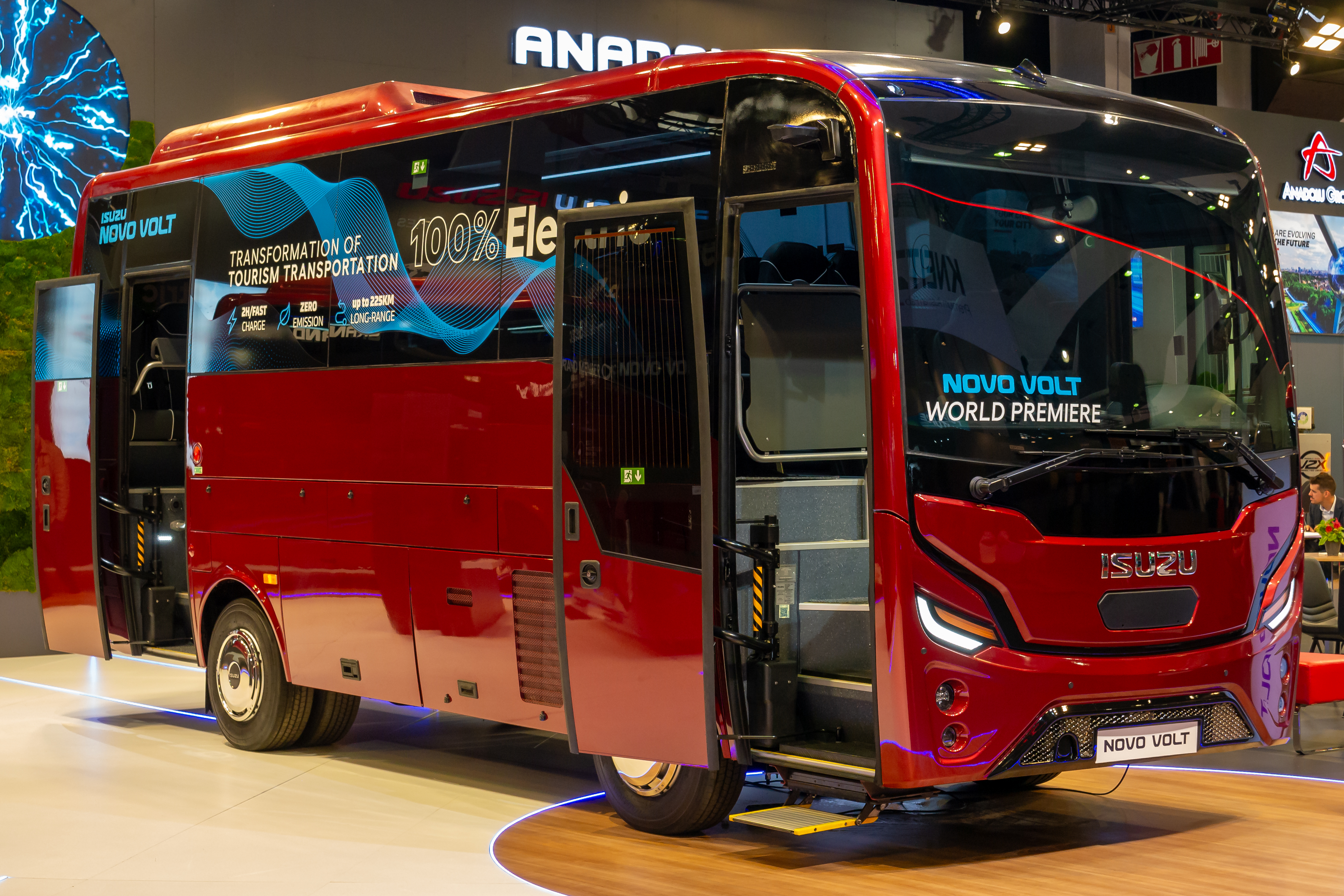
Novo Volt

- Isuzu Classic/Urban/Ecobus/Oasis (27 seats) - 7 m (23 ft) length. Previous generation vocational midibus for export markets. Oasis additionally features jump seats and air-filter snorkel for tough road and climate conditions.
- Novo (27 seats) - 7.3 m (24 ft) length. Isuzu N-Series based vocational midibus
- Novociti (55 passengers) - 7.5 m (25 ft) length, 2 door wheelchair accessible transit bus model
- Turquoise (31 seats) - Isuzu N-Series based 7.7 m (25 ft) length tourism midibus
- Novociti Life (60 passengers) - 8 m (26 ft) length, 2 door wheelchair accessible transit bus model
- Visigo (39 seats) - 9.5 m (31 ft) length flagship tourism midibus
- Citibus (76 passengers) - 9.5 m (31 ft) length, 3 door low floor transit bus model

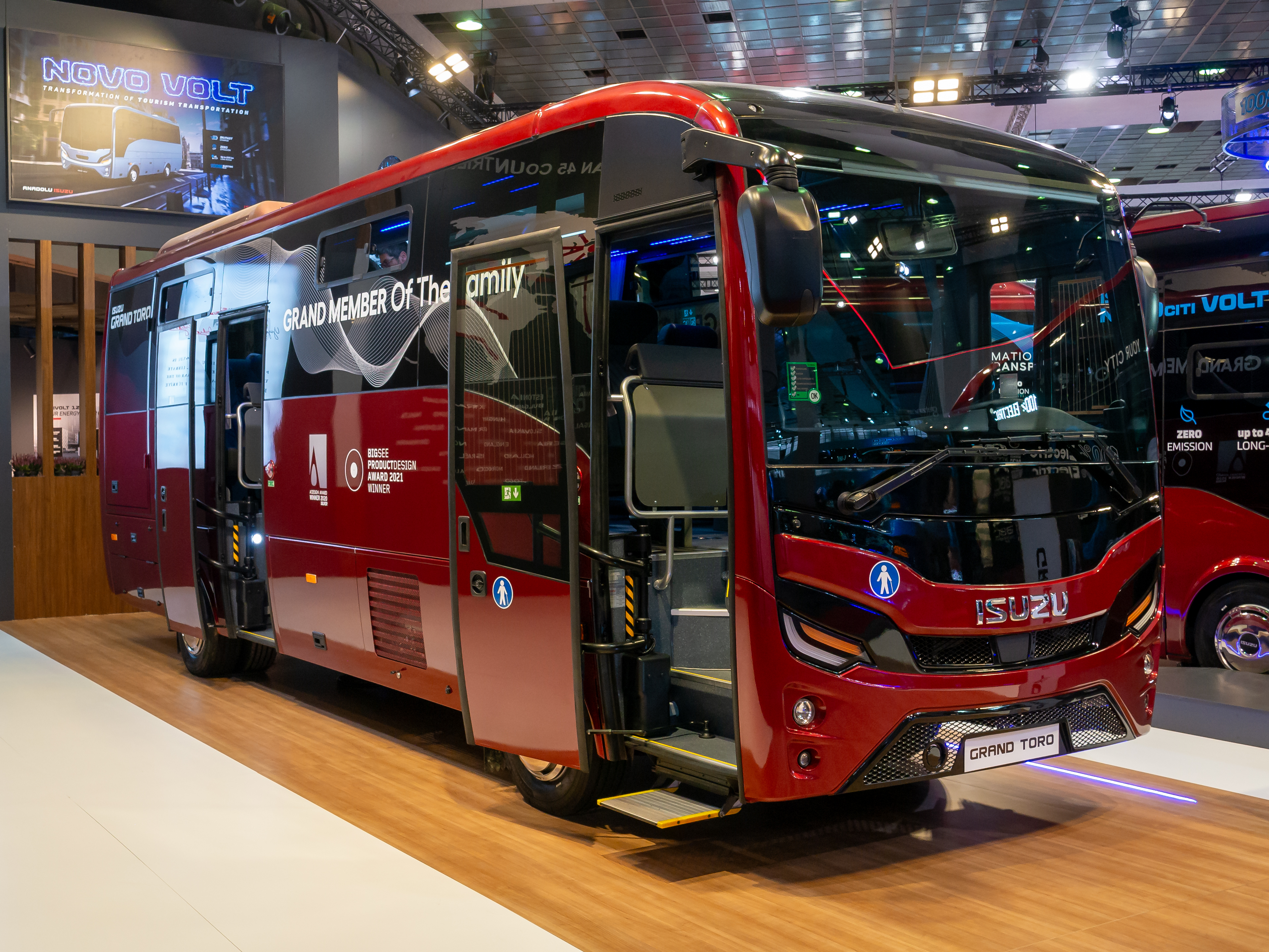
Grand Toro

=== Buses ===
- Citiport 12 (107 passengers) - 12 m (39 ft) length, 3 door low floor transit bus model
- Kendo 12.3 (59 seats) - 12.3 m (40 ft) length intercity bus
- Kendo 13 CNG (63 seats) - 13 m (43 ft) length intercity bus
- Citiport 18 (155 passengers) - 18.2 m (60 ft) length, 4 door low floor transit bus model

== See also ==
- List of companies of Turkey
