= Poliya =

Poliya Composite Resins and Polymers Inc.
- Type: Private
- Industry: Chemicals; Composites; Polymers
- Founded: 1983
- Founder: Ismet Cakar, Guzin Cakar
- Headquarters: Istanbul, Turkey
- Area served: Turkey, Europe, Americas, Middle East, Africa
- Key people: Ozgur Cakar (CEO); Cem Gurkan (MD); Seher Bayrak (CFO)
- Products: Composites, Polyester resins, Gelcoat, Vinyl ester resin
- Revenue: ▲US$160 million (2022)
- Number of employees: 160 (2022)
- Website: poliya.com

Poliya Composite Resins and Polymers, Inc. (Poliya) was founded in 1983 and specializes in developing and manufacturing polymers and composite resins. Poliya's headquarters are located in Istanbul, Turkey with other Poliya locations and manufacturing facilities in Turkey and Russia.

As of 2022, Poliya is listed in the Top 500 largest companies of Turkey. Their flagship product is, Polijel high performance gelcoat series. The company also manufactures UPE-polyester resins, vinyl ester resins, pigment color pastes, solid surface chips, adhesives, bonding pastes, mold release agents and waxes. Poliya serves 25 countries worldwide.

The company is a member of the European Chemical Industry Council (Cefic), Turkish Chemical Manufacturers Association, and the Turkish Composites Manufacturers Association.

== History ==
Ismet Cakar, a chemical engineer, began making early contributions to polyester resin modification and gelcoat UV stabilizers. Cakar worked on polymerization and resins at Ilkester, leaving to found a start-up. In 1983, Cakar launched the company that would become Poliya. Early on, Poliya recognized that composite materials would need special functions under different usage conditions (UV resistant, chemical resistant, etc.), and these composite resins would be required in various low weight and corrosion resistant applications which would require similar modification technology.

Poliya manufacturing facility in Cerkezkoy, Turkey

== Research ==
Poliya headquarters in Istanbul, Turkey

Poliya contributes scientific research and local industrial activities in Turkey, which has a short history starting in the 1980s. Most recently, Poliya sponsored the first TURK-KOMPOZIT 2013 Composites Event. Other research and events include Polymeric Composites Symposium, Exhibition and Workshops. Sakarya University Advanced Applied Technologies – Saugar X7 and Sahimo projects as well as Yildiz Technical University AE2 Project and many others to support students and colleges. Also Poliya took place in TUBİTAK-TEYDEP Technology and Innovation Support Programs. Poliya also took part in Industrial Partnership Program designed by TUBITAK-MAM and supported by World Bank About nanocomposites research, Poliya in partnership with Technische Universität Hamburg-Harburg and IYTE has created a joint project and published various scientific articles about polyester resin and carbon nano tubes for the advancement of nanocomposite knowledge. Another joint project created by Poliya and Dokuz Eylül University, Institute of Marine Sciences and Technologies of scientific studies was about the use of Biocides and silver ions with Polijel gelcoats in the marine environment.

== Organization ==
Poliya's core businesses focus on composite performance materials, composite adhesives, composite coatings, solid surface materials, pigment color pastes and release agent technologies, which have been supplemented through several notable expansions. It has also divested itself of less profitable segments.

== Composite performance materials ==
Combining Polipol polyester resins and Polives vinyl ester resin as well as gelcoat products, composite performance materials provide products for the construction, transport, marine, defense, wind energy, sports equipment, chemical containment industries. The main manufacturing plant is located in Southeastern Europe, Cerkezkoy-Turkey.
