= Estap =

Turkish electronics manufacturer

Estap A.Ş.
- Industry: Enclosures for data communication equipment
- Founded: 1989
- Headquarters: Istanbul, Turkey
- Products: Networking, servers, datacenters, outdoor applications, industrial usage, telecommunication, fiber optic infrastructure
- Number of employees: 400
- Parent: Legrand (company)
- Website: www.estap.com.tr

Estap A.Ş. is a company based in Istanbul, Turkey, specializing in the electronic enclosures industry.

== Company Overview ==
Estap A.S. specializes in enclosures for data communication equipment such racks, cabinets and accessories for networking, servers, datacenters, outdoor applications, industrial usage, telecommunication and fiber optic infrastructure.

Estap owns and operates its factory in Eskişehir and employs nearly 400 people. Estap is the largest manufacturer of enclosures for data communication equipment. With approximately 70% of its being exported to 70 foreign countries, Estap is ranked among the top 1000 export companies of Turkey.

== Acquisition ==
Estap was acquired by Legrand Group on April 10, 2008.
