= Ugur Group Companies =

- Company type: Private
- Industry: Conglomerate
- Founded: 1954; 72 years ago
- Headquarters: Aydın, Turkey
- Area served: Worldwide
- Products: Cooling Equipment, Medical, Motorcycle, Dried food
- Number of employees: 2,500 (2013)
- Parent: Ugur Group Companies
- Website: ugursirketlergrubu.com

Ugur Group Companies (Turkish: Uğur Şirketler Grubu) is a Turkish group of manufacturing companies.

The company was founded when Ugur Cooling started ice cream machine production in Nazilli in 1954. Today, the company produces a range of equipment including deep freezers to bottled water coolers, motorcycles, scooters and cosmetics, with the company operating Europe's second-biggest refrigeration plant in Nazilli. The company operates in 142 countries under six brands.

The company presently has a total 310,000 square metres (3,300,000 sq ft) of manufacturing area and 2,500 employees.

== Group companies and brands ==
| Company name | Brand | Year founded |
|---|---|---|
| Ugur Cooling Inc. Co | Ugur Cooling; Delta Cooling | 1954 |
| Uğur Motor Vehicles Inc. Co. | Kymco Motocycles; Mondial Motorcycle; Motovento Accessories; E-mon | 2004 |
| Kuteks Inc. Co. | Kuteks; Fortune | 1984 |
| Uğur Integrated Food Ltd. Co. | U'Fresh | 2011 |

== Ugur Cooling Inc. Co. ==
Uğur Cooling Inc. Co.
- Company type: Private
- Industry: Cooling Equipment
- Founded: 1954
- Headquarters: Aydın, Turkey
- Area served: Worldwide
- Number of employees: 1,600 (2013)
- Parent: Ugur Group Companies
- Website: www.ugur.com

Ugur Cooling Inc. Co. was founded in 1954 and is one of a product category under group companies. It includes its own brands named Ugur Cooling and Delta Cooling.

Ugur Cooling

Ugur Cooling is a Turkish foundation which started its production with producing ice cream makers in 1954 in Nazilli, Aydın. Domestic Turkish brand Ugur Cooling is operating in 5 continents for 137 countries, participating Dubai exhibition today. Ugur Cooling is known as a cooling group in Turkey, in the area of commercial coolers, freezers, ice cream and ice making machines as well.

All product groups:

| Freezers | Coolers | Supermarket Products | Horeca |
|---|---|---|---|
| Ice Cream / Frozen Food | Single Door | Cooler | Cold Beverage |
| Upright | Double Door | Freezer | Wine |
| Chest | Chest | Cooler / Freezer | Ice Cream |
| | Open Front | Open Front | Pastry Display |
| | Can | Pool Type | |
| | Counter Top | | |

Delta Cooling is powered by Ugur Cooling Inc. Co. in 2013 as a Turkish deep freeze company. The company takes its logo shape where the Greater Menderes River meets the sea with a triangular structure, and its color as a passion symbol.

== Ugur Motor Vehicles Inc. Co. ==
Uğur Motor Vehicles Inc. Co
- Company type: Private
- Industry: Conglomerate
- Founded: 2004
- Headquarters: Aydın, Turkey
- Area served: Worldwide
- Products: Motorcycle
- Number of employees: 1,200 (2015)
- Parent: Ugur Group Companies
- Website: www.uma.com.tr

Ugur Motor Vehicles Inc. Co. has started its main activity in 2004 by their own registered brand Mondial in motorcycle sector.

=== Mondial Motor ===
According to data of the Turkish Statistical Institute, Mondial was presented as Turkey's Best-Seller Motorcycle Brand in 2013. As today, Mondial is operating by its 400 sales points, 528 maintenance facilities and 250 auxiliary equipment sales points.

Kymco

Kymco was founded in 1964 in Taiwan. The company is operating with about 4,000 workers and producing more than 570,000 vehicles per year as one of world's biggest scooter, motorcycle, ATV manufacturer. Kymco is importing to The Far East, Asia, Europe, North and South America. Kymco has signed distributorship agreement with Ugur Motor Vehicles Inc. Co. by July in 2014. By this collaboration Kymco has started supporting marketing activities, support after purchase, auxiliary equipment and maintenance facility in Turkish market.

Motovento

Motovento was found to gather qualified world brands under the roof of Ugur Motor Vehicles Inc. Co. Helmets, apparels, shoes, underwear, motorcycle accessories and auxiliary equipments can be found under the brand of Motovento. The company cooperates Alpinestars, Brembo, Airoh Helmet, Choho, HJC Helmets, Interphone Cellularline, IXIL SILENCERS, JUST1 Helmets, KMC, NİTEK Handcraft Helmets, E Origine, Puig, Regina Chain, rizoma, SHAD, Shiro Helmets, SIX2.

E-Mon

E-mon has found in 2015 under Ugur Motor Vehicles Inc. Co. to produce environmentalist, low-energy and anti noise pollution electric motor products.

== Kuteks Inc. Co. ==
Kuteks Inc. Co.
- Company type: Private
- Industry: Conglomerate
- Founded: 1954
- Headquarters: Aydın, Turkey
- Area served: Worldwide
- Products: Medical
- Number of employees: 2,500 (2013)
- Parent: Ugur Group Companies
- Website: www.kuteks.com.tr

Kuteks Inc. Co., was founded in 1984 to produce medical consumables. The company has involved to Ugur Group Companies in 2002 and became its medical presenter in Turkey. Brands under Kuteks Inc. Co. can be found as Kuteks and Fortune.

Kuteks

Producing medical consumables since 1984. Kuteks products are provided to pharmacies and hospitals through medical representatives. Additionally, Kuteks products are exported to many developed European countries as well as several other foreign countries.

All products:

Lastobant
Hydrophilic Gauze
Classic Knee Care
Sterilized Hydrophilic Gauze
Light Elastic Gauze
Crepe Elastic Gauze
Classic Woolen Corset
Cohesive Bandages
Cohesive Bandage Colored
Hydrofoil Gas Compress

Fortune

Kuteks has launched its own sub-brand named Fortune in 2010.

All products:

Blood Glucose Device
Blood Glucose Strips
Bamboo Lower Leg
Bamboo Foot Strap
Bamboo Armrest
Bamboo Breeches
Bamboo Arm Bracelet
Elite Lower Leg
Elite Foot Strap
Elite Armrest
Elite Arm Bracelet
Elite Hand Bracelet
Elite Breeches
Elite Kneepads
Large Blood Pressure Meter Arm
Meter Wrist Blood Pressure Monitor
Small Arm Blood Pressure Gauge
Nurse Type Blood Pressure Monitor
2 Ply Surgical Mask
3 Ply Surgical Mask
Digital Thermometer
Digital Capped Thermometer
Digital Flexible Thermometer
Digital Pacifier Thermometer
Digital Ear Thermometer
Digital Capped Ear Thermometer
Pregnancy Test Cassette Type
Wound Pad Non-Woven
Wound Pad – Clear
Band-Aids
Sterilized Injectors

== Uğur Integrated Food Ltd. Co. ==
Uğur Integrated Food Ltd. Co.
- Company type: Private
- Industry: Conglomerate
- Founded: 1954
- Headquarters: Aydın, Turkey
- Area served: Worldwide
- Products: Dried Food
- Number of employees: 2,500 (2013)
- Parent: Ugur Group Companies
- Website: www.ugurentegregida.com.tr

Ugur Integrated Food Ltd. Co. was established in 2011 in Dallıca, Nazilli under the roof of Ugur Group Companies. The company has its own dried food brand named U'Fresh.

=== U'Fresh ===
U’fresh dried food has found in 2011 to produce and process (dried vegetables, fruit, meat etc.) on about 5,000 m2 indoor and 12,000 m2 outdoor area. The production and process area has ovens to dry a variety of vegetables, fruits etc. In addition, cooling products that preserve from 0, -18 till -40 can be found in the factory.

All product groups:

Dried Fig
Chestnut
Apricot
