= Enerco Energy =

Turkish natural gas company

Enerco Energy Inc.
- Company type: Private
- Industry: Oil and gas
- Founded: 2004
- Founder: AKFEL Group
- Headquarters: Istanbul, Turkey
- Key people: Mehmet Fatih Baltacı (Chairman)
- Products: Natural gas
- Services: Import and wholesale of natural gas
- Owner: AKFEL Group; OMV
- Website: www.enercoenerji.com

Enerco Energy is a natural gas company in Turkey. It was established in 2004. 60% of Enerco Energy belongs to Akfel Group, a Turkish energy engineering, construction, equipment production, and consultancy company, and 40% belongs to OMV Gas & Power.

In September 2007, Enerco signed a natural gas purchase contract with Gazprom lasting until 2022 with a volume of 2.5 billion cubic metres (88 billion cubic feet) per year. The company started importing of natural gas in April 2009, being the largest importer after Botaş.

== See also ==
List of companies of Turkey
