= Çiçeksepeti =

Turkish online retailer

- Company type: E-commerce
- Founded: 2006
- Headquarters: Istanbul, Turkey
- Products: flowers, gifts
- Owner: Emre Aydın
- Number of employees: 325
- Subsidiaries: LolaFlora
- Website: www.ciceksepeti.com

Çiçeksepeti is an online floral and gourmet foods, gift retailer operating in Turkey.

Çiçeksepeti was founded in 2006 by Emre Aydın, a Turkish İnternet entrepreneur. Amazon.com invested in Çiçeksepeti in 2011, Çiçek Sepeti acquired major online florists 444cicek.com in 2012, and cicek.com in 2013. in 2014, a major gourmet food retailer, Bonnyfood, was acquired. Fashion and cosmetics retailer Mizu was founded in 2012. In 2016, Mizu brand started to operate as Lolaflora. LolaFlora brand, the current subsidiary of Çiçeksepeti, provides online flower and gift ordering services in Mexico.

Çiçeksepeti was selected as country representative by Endeavor Turkey in 2010. In 2011, Founder & CEO Emre Aydın was named Endeavor Entrepreneur at an event in London.
