= Hunca Cosmetics =

Turkish cosmetics company

Hunca Cosmetics was established in 1957 in Istanbul. The company's founding father is Adnan Hunca. It was created as a family company producing cosmetics and toiletries. The company's factory is located in the Çerkezköy Organized Industrial Zone in the Çerkezköy district of Tekirdağ and has distributors in Europe and Asia.
