= Şahinler Holding =

- Company type: Public/Private company
- Industry: Textile
- Founded: 1984
- Headquarters: Istanbul, Turkey
- Key people: Kemal Sahin, CEO
- Products: Textiles, Clothes
- Revenue: US$1.4 Billion (2007)
- Net income: US$55 Million (2007)
- Number of employees: 12,000 (2007)
- Website: www.sahinlerholding.com.tr

Şahinler Holding is Turkey's largest fashion and integrated textile group, and it is also the 18th largest textile company in the world and the 3rd largest in Europe.

The company has 27 production facilities and 350 stores in 15 countries, producing and selling over 50 million ready-to-wear garments.

== See also ==
- List of companies of Turkey
