= Canovate =

Turkish electronics manufacturer

Canovate Elektronik Endüstri ve Ticaret A.Ş.
- Company type: Anonim Şirket (A.Ş.)
- Industry: Electrical equipment
- Founded: (1965), incorporated 1996
- Headquarters: Istanbul, Turkey
- Area served: Worldwide
- Key people: Can Gur (President and CEO), Cem Gur (President and CEO), Levent Gulbahar (Chairman of the supervisory board), Zafer Akay (CFO)
- Products: Include Data centers, Enclosure cabinets, Rack cabinets, Servers, UPS
- Number of employees: 1,000 (2019)
- Website: canovate.com

Canovate is a Turkish manufacturer of industrial computer enclosures, server cabinets, fiber optic connectivity and data center products as well as military and defence systems such as optical radar and acoustic and optical sensors for the Turkish military. Canovate Group product lines range from fiber optic connectivity to data centers solutions and from rack cabinets to intelligent power distribution inits coupled with (B2B) and (B2C) sales.

== Products ==
Designs, Develops, Manufactures and Markets:

- Fibre Optic Connectivity based FTTX & Fiber Optic Transmission-Access Products
- Data denter & data center cooling products & solutions
- Rack Cabinets, Enclosure Cabinets, Boxes & Accessories
- Outdoor Enclosures, Frames, Boxes & Accessories
- Structured cabling products
- PDUs and UPS
- Remote Monitoring, Access and Management
- Flat Display Mounting Interfaces, HDMI Cables & Screen Cleaners

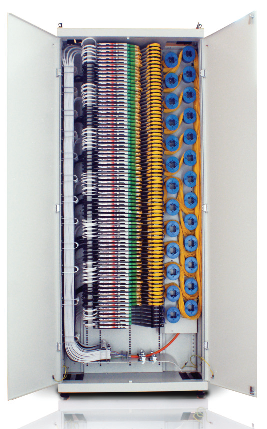
Fiber Optic Distribution frame solutions from Canovate Group

== Facts and figures ==
- Headquarters: Alemdag, Istanbul, Turkey
- Serves 40,000 customers in more than 60 countries on six continents
- As of 2011, it had 300 employees, 50 engineers
- It was ISO 9001 approved
- Operates in its 26,000m2 manufacturing facilities in Istanbul
- Invested 15% of revenues annually to its research and development of products, solutions and new technologies along with various awarded patents
