= Yüksel Tohumculuk =

- Company type: Private
- Industry: Agriculture
- Founded: 1996; 30 years ago
- Headquarters: Antalya, Turkey
- Key people: Mehmet Yüksel
- Website: http://www.yukseltohum.com/

Yüksel Seed Agriculture Industry and Trade Inc. (Turkish: Yüksel Tohumculuk) was founded in 1990 by Mehmet Yüksel, an agricultural engineer (M.Sc.). It is a family firm based in Antalya, in which his siblings are also partners. It has foreign investments and companies in important vegetable producing countries such as the Netherlands, Spain, Poland, Chile, Mexico, Brazil, Morocco, China and Pakistan. Yüksel Seed, which exports seeds to more than 78 countries, has a very strong R&D and production infrastructure in vegetable and potato seeds. Yüksel Seed, a globally recognized brand in seed growing, is Turkey's global seed brand. Yüksel Tohum, which has twelve research, trial and production stations, six of which are abroad and six in Turkey, has 3800 decares of land and 1800 decares of modern greenhouses. When evaluated in many respects, Yüksel Tohum has become Turkey's largest seed brand.
