= List of companies listed on the Borsa Istanbul =

Company	Symbol	Notes
== A ==
A.B.D Hazine Bonosu Dolar B Tipi Borsa Yatırım Fonu	USDTR	Fund tracking the performance of the U.S Treasury Short-Term Bond Index.
A.V.O.D Dried Foods and Produce	AVOD	Sun-dried tomatoes and other food products, based in Menemen, İzmir.
Acıselsan Acıpayam Cellulose	ACSEL	Cellulose producer in Acıpayam, Denizli.
Adana Çimento	ADANA, ADBGR, ADNAC	Cement producer in Adana.
Adel Kalemcilik Stationery	ADEL	Anadolu Group company, Turkish partners of German pen manufacturers Faber-Castell.
Adese Shopping Centres	ADESE	Ittifak Holding's retail arm. Stores and shopping centres in central Anatolia.
Afyon Çimento	AFYON	Cement producer in Afyon.
Akbank	AKBNK	National bank belonging to Sabancı Holding.
Akçansa Çimento	AKCNS	Partnership between Sabancı Holding and Heidelberg Cement.
Akdeniz Guvenlik	AKGUV	Private security firm.
Akenerji	AKENR	Electricity producer of the Akkök Group, with power stations around Turkey.
Akfen GYO	AKFGY	Real estate arm of Akfen Holding, operates Novotel and Ibis hotels in Turkey and elsewhere.
Akfen Holding	AKFEN	Infrastructure projects such as airports, ports, water and waste, energy and real estate.
Akın Tekstil	ATEKS	Textile factory in Lüleburgaz, west of Istanbul.
Akiş Gayrimenkul	AKSGY	Real estate arm of the Akkök Group, specialising in shopping malls.
Akmerkez Gayrimenkul	AKMGY	Large shopping centre in central Istanbul.
Aksa	AKSA	Acrylic and carbon fibre producer in Yalova, part of the Akkök Group.
Aksa Enerji	AKSEN	Electricity producer, power plants around Turkey.
Aksel Enerji	AKSEL	Stationery, printing business, moving into the energy sector.
Aksigorta	AKGRT	Insurance, partnership of Sabancı Holding and Belgian insurance company Ageas.
Aksu Enerji	AKSUE	Hydro-electric power station in Isparta.
Akyurek Pazarlama	AKPAZ	Consumer goods distributor, brands include Unilever.
Alarko Carrier	ALCAR	Heating and air conditioning, partnership between Alarko and Carrier Corporation.
Alarko Gayrimenkul	ALGYO	Real estate investment arm of Alarko.
Alarko Holding	ALARK	Engineering, energy, real estate.
Albaraka Türk	ALBRK	Turkish operation of the interest-free Al Baraka Banking Group.
Alcatel-Lucent Teletaş	ALCTL	Communications technology company of multinational Alcatel-Lucent.
Alkim	ALKIM	Sodium sulphate and salt manufacturer in central Turkey.
Alkim Kağıt	ALKA	Paper plant of Alkim, in İzmir.
Alternatif Bank	ALNTF, ARFYO	ABank, part of the Anadolu Group.
Altınyağ	ALYAG	Vegetable oil producer in İzmir, part of Artı Yatırım Holding.
Altınyunus	AYCES	Operators of the Altınyunus resort in Çeşme, İzmir.
Anadolu Sigorta	ANSGR	Insurance subsidiary of İş Bankası.
Anadolu Cam	ANACM	Glass packaging division of the Şişecam Group.
Anadolu Efes Beverage Group	AEFES	Brewer and bottler.
Anadolu Hayat Emeklilik	ANHYT	Life insurance subsidiary of İş Bankası.
Anadolu Isuzu	ASUZU	Bus and coach manufacturing joint venture of the Anadolu Group, Isuzu and Itochu
Anel Elektrik	ANELE	Electricity contractor of the Anel Group.
Aneltech	ANELT	Technology and engineering arm of the Anel Group.
Ansa Holding	ANSA	Investment.
Ar Tarim	ARTOG	Organic agriculture in Bismil, Diyarbakır.
Arbul Tekstil	ARBUL	Dying and processing of textiles.
Arçelik	ARCLK	Household appliances manufacturer.
Arena Bilgisayar	ARENA	Computer and consumer electronics wholesaler.
Armada Computer Systems	ARMDA	IT sector distributor.
Arsan Textile	ARSAN	Cotton yarn and knitted fabrics.
Artı Investment	ARTI	Investment.
ASELSAN	ASELS	Radios and defense electronic systems for the Turkish Armed Forces.
Asil Çelik	ASCEL	Steel products.
Aslan Çimento	ASLAN	The first cement plant in Turkey.
Asya Katılım Bankası	ASYAB	Bank Asya.
Ata Gayrimenkul	ATAGY	Real estate investment wing of Ata Holding.
Ataç	ATAC	Construction and other sectors.
Atakule	AGYO	Real estate investment.
Atlantik Petrol	ATPET	Grease and motor oil producer.
Atlantis Holding	ATSYH	Investment.
Atlas Menkul	ATLAS	Portfolio management.
Aviva Sigorta	AVIVA	Turkish arm of UK-based Aviva insurance.
Avrasya Real Estate	AVGYO	Investment consultant.
Avrasya Petrol ve Turistik Tesisleri	AVTUR	Investments.
Ayen Enerji	AYEN	Electricity producer.
Ayes Steel	AYES	Rolled steel.
Aygaz	AYGAZ	LPG distributor, part of Koc Holding.
== B ==
Bagfaş	BAGFS	Fertilizer plants near Bandırma, Balıkesir.
Bakırcı GYO	BKRGY	Real estate investments.
Bak Ambalaj	BAKAB	Flexible packaging plants in İzmir.
Balatacılar	BALAT	Brake pad plants in İzmir.
Banvit	BANVT	Poultry production.
Baştaş Çimento	BASCM	Cement producer in Ankara.
Batıçim Çimento	BTCIM	Cement producer, part of the Batı Anadolu group.
Batısöke Çimento	BSOKE	Cement producer, part of the Batı Anadolu group.
Berkosan	BRKSN	Insulation and packaging manufacturer.
Beşiktaş JK	BJKAS	Operators of the Beşiktaş sports clubs.
Bilici Yatırım	BLCYT	Textiles and agriculture.
Bim	BIMAS	Hard-discount retailer.
Bimeks	BMEKS	Electronics retailer.
Birko	BRKO	Textiles and energy group.
Birlik Mensucat	BRMEN	Cotton products, especially under the Soley brand.
Bisaş Tekstil	BISAS	Cotton fabrics.
Bizim Menkul Investment Funds	DJIMT, KTLME	Funds operated by Bizim, the investment consultant of Boydak Holding.
Bizim Toptan	BIZIM	Cash and carry stores.
Bolu Çimento	BOLUC	Cement plant in Bolu.
Borusan Mannesmann	BRSAN	Steel pipe manufacturing partnership between Borusan and Salzgitter Mannesmann GmbH.
Borusan Yatırım	BRYAT	Investment vehicle of Borusan, the steel, distributorship, logistics and technology group.
Bosch Fren Sistemleri	BFREN	Hydraulic brake systems, subsidiary of Robert Bosch GmbH.
Bossa	BOSSA	Textile manufacturer largely owned by Akkardan.
Boyner Büyük Mağazacılık	BOYNR, BOYP	Retail stores, part of Boyner Holding.
Brisa	BRISA	Tyre manufacturer, joint venture between the Bridgestone Corporation of Japan and Sabancı Holding.
Burçelik	BURCE	Heavy machinery, large steel castings and industrial valves manufacturer in Bursa.
Burçelik Vana	BURVA	The valve manufacturing division of Burçelik.
Bursa Çimento	BUCIM	Cement producer in Bursa.
== C/Ç ==
CarrefourSa	CARFA, CARFB	Joint venture of French retail giant Carrefour with Sabancı Holding.
CLK Holding	CLKHO	Textiles. mining, drilling,
Coca-Cola Içecek	CCOLA	Bottling operation owned by Efes Beverage Group and The Coca-Cola Company.
Componenta	COMDO	Iron and aluminium components and casting.
Cosmos Yatırım	COSMO	Portfolio management.
Creditwest	CRDFA	Factoring business of Altınbaş Holding.
Çelebi Handling	CLEBI	First privately owned ground handling services company in the Turkish aviation industry.
Çelik Halat	CELHA	High carbon wire and steel rope.
Çemaş	CEMAS	Iron and steel producer.
Çemtaş	CEMTS	Steel plant and rolling mill in Bursa.
Çimentaş	CMENT, CMBTN	Cement and ready-mixed concrete.
Çimsa	CIMSA	Cement and building chemicals wing of Sabancı Holding.
== D ==
Dagi Holding	DAGI, DAGHL	Textiles.
Dardanel	DARDL	Canned tuna and other food products.
Datagate	DGATE	Distributor of IT products.
Demısaş	DMSAS	Iron casting production.
Denizbank	DENİZ, DZGYO	National bank, owned by Sberbank of Russia.
Denizli Cam	DENCM	Handmade glass factory, part of the Şişecam/Paşabahçe group.
Derimod	DERIM	Leather goods manufacturer and retailer.
Desa	DESA	Leather goods manufacturer and retailer.
Despec Bilgisayar	DESPC	Distribution of IT products.
Deva	DEVA	Pharmaceutical producer.
Diriteks	DIRIT	Producer of blankets.
Ditaş	DITAS	Manufacturing vehicle suspension parts.
Do & Co	DOCO	Catering.
Doğan Burda	DOBUR	Magazine publishing operations of the Doğan Group.
Doğan Holding	DOHOL	Media group.
Doğan Media Group	DYHOL, DGZTE	Newspaper publishing operations of the Doğan Group.
Doğtaş	DGKLB	Furniture production and sales.
Doğusan Boru	DOGUB	Construction materials.
Doğuş Gayrimenkul	DGGYO	Property development arm of Doğuş Holding.
Doğuş Otomotiv	DOAS	Automotive importer and distributor, part of Doğuş Holding.
Dow Jones Istanbul 20	DJIST	First exchange-traded fund in Turkey.
Duran Doğan	DURDO	Printing and packaging.
DYO Boya	DYOBY	Paint manufacturer.
== E ==
Eczacıbaşı Yapı	ECYAP	Building products wing of Eczacıbaşı, producers of VitrA (sanitaryware)
Eczacıbaşı	ECILC, ECZYT, ECBYO	Pharmaceutical group.
Edip	EDIP	Former textile producer, now property developer.
Ege Endüstri	EGEEN	Axle manufacturer for the automotive industry, based in İzmir.
Ege Gübre	EGGUB	Fertilizer plant in İzmir.
Ege Profil	EGPRO	PVC door and window profile manufacturer belonging to the Belgian Deceuninck Group.
Ege Seramik	EGSER	Ceramic producer in İzmir.
EGC	EGLYO, EGCYO, EGCYH	Venture capital portfolio investor in energy, agriculture, and real estate.
Egeplast	EPLAS	Plastic piping manufacturer in İzmir.
Ekiz Olive Oil and Soap	EKIZ	Olive oil and soap producer in İzmir.
Emek Elektrik Endustrisi	EMKEL	Electrical component manufacturer in Ankara.
Eminiş Ambalaj	EMNIS	Metal and plastic packaging to the paint, chemicals and food sectors.
Emlak Konut	EKGYO	Real estate investment subsidiary of the Housing Development Administration of Turkey (TOKI).
Enka İnşaat	ENKAI	Construction conglomerate.
Erbosan	ERBOS	Steel pipe producer in Kayseri.
Erdemir	EREGL	Steel plants in Turkey and Romania.
Ericom Telekom Enerji	ERICO	Infrastructure for the telecommunications industry.
Ersu	ERSU	Fruit processor in Ereğli, Konya and Niğde.
Escort Teknoloji	ESCOM	Computer manufacturer and retailer.
Esem	ESEMS	Sports retailer.
Euro Yatırım	EUROM, EMBYO, EUKYO, ETYAT	Financial services.
Evkur	EVKUR	Retail organization in Istanbul
== F ==
Favori	FVORI	Hotels and tourism.
Federal-Mogul Izmit Piston	FMIZP	Piston manufacturing joint venture of the American Federal-Mogul group.
Fenerbahçe Futbol A.Ş.	FENER	Football department of Fenerbahçe Sports Club.
Feniş Alüminyum	FENIS	Aluminium profile extrusion plant in Gebze, near Istanbul.
Fon Leasing	FONFK	Leasing.
Finans Finansal	FFKRL	Leasing operation of Finansbank.
Finansbank	FINBN, FNSYO, IST30, GT30	Banking.
Flap Tour	FLAP	Event organisation.
Ford Otosan	FROTO	Automotive manufacturing joint venture, equally owned by Ford Motor Company and Koç Holding.
Frigo Pak Gıda	FRIGO	Drinks, fruit juices and canned foods, sold under the Sunpride brand.
FTSE Istanbul	FBIST	Fixed income tracking fund(tracks FTSE Turkish Lira Government Bond Index).
== G ==
Galatasaray S.K.	GSRAY	Galatasary Sports Club.
Garanti Faktoring	GARFA	Factoring arm of Garanti Bank.
Garanti Yatırım	GRNYO	Investment Trust of Doğuş Holding, owners of Garanti Bank.
Gedik Girişim	GDKGS	Investment portfolio.
Gedik Yatırım	GEDIK, GDKYO	Portfolio management.
Gediz Ambalaj	GEDZA	Manufacturer of corrugated polypropylene sheet, in Gediz, Kutahya.
Gen Yatırım	GENYH, GENPWR	Energy, manufacturing, real estate group.
Gentaş	GENTS	Multi-layer synthetic sheet manufacturer in Mengen, Bolu.
Gersan Elektrik	GEREL	Electrical industry hardware manufacturer.
Gimsan Gediz	GEDIZ	Textile factory in Gediz.
Global Yatırım	GLYHO, GLBMD	Investment portfolio and capital market brokerage services.
Goodyear Lastikleri	GOODY	Turkish subsidiary of Goodyear Tyres.
Göltaş Çimento	GOLTS	Cement plant in Isparta.
Gözde Girişim	GOZDE	Investment portfolio.
GSD Holding	GSDHO, GSDDE	Banking, financial services and shipping group, including Tekstilbank.
Gübretaş	GUBRF	Fertiliser manufacturer.
Güler Yatırım	GLRYH	Investment company.
Güneş Sigorta	GUSGR	Insurance subsidiary of VakıfBank.
== H ==
Hacı Ömer Sabancı Holding	SAHOL	Parent company of the Sabancı industrial and financial group.
Halk Gayrimenkul	HLGYO	Real estate investment trust of Halk Bankası.
Halk Sigorta	HALKS	Insurance affiliate of Halk Bankası.
Hateks	HATEK	Textile manufacturer in Antakya.
Haznedar Refrakter	HZNDR	Refractory materials producer.
Hektaş	HEKTS	Agricultural pesticide producer.
Hürriyet	HURGZ	Newspaper publisher, subsidiary of Doğan Holding.
== I/İ ==
Işıklar Yatırım	ISYHO, IEYHO	Construction and energy group.
İdaş	IDAS	Bed and sofa manufacturer.
Idealist Gayrimenkul	IDGYO	Real-estate developer.
İhlas Ev Aletleri	IHEVA	Home appliances manufacturer of İhlas Holding.
İhlas Gazetecilik	IHGZT	Newspaper publisher of İhlas Holding, including the Türkiye newspaper.
İhlas Holding	IHLAS	Home appliances, mining, publishing group.
İhlas Madencilik	IHMAD	Mining operations of İhlas Holding.
İhlas Yayıncılık	IHYAY	Publishing subsidiary of İhlas Holding.
İndeks Bilgisayar	INDES	IT sector distributor.
İnfo Yatırım	INFO	Investment broker.
İntema	INTEM	Kitchen and bathroom manufacturer of the Eczacıbaşı group.
Ipek Doğal Enerji	IPEKE	Energy exploration.
Goldist	GLDTR	Gold market tracking fund.
Gümüş Borsa Yatırım Fonu	GMSTR	Silver market tracking fund.
İş Leasing	ISFIN	Leasing subsidiary of İş Bankası.
İş Gayrimenkul	ISGYO	Real estate portfolio of İş Bankası.
İş Girişim	ISGSY	Private equity portfolio of İş Bankası.
İş Yatırım	ISY30, ISYAT, ISMEN, ISUVT	Investment portfolios of İş Bankası.
İşbir	ISBIR	Textiles and mattresses group.
Ittifak Holding	ITTFH	Retail, distribution, construction, engineering group, based in Konya.
İzmir Demir Çelik	IZMDC	Iron and steel producer in İzmir.
İzocam	IZOCM	Insulation manufacturer.
== J ==
Jantsa	JANTS	Wheel manufacturer in Aydın.
== K ==
Kapital Yatırım	KPHOL	Investment broker.
Kaplamin Ambalaj	KAPLM	Boxes and packaging manufacturer.
Karakaş Atlantis	KRATL	Jewelry manufacturer and wholesaler.
Kardemir	KRDMA, KRDMB, KRDMD	Steel producer in Karabük.
Karel Electronics	KAREL	Telecommunications equipment manufacturer.
Karsan Otomotiv	KARSN	Commercial vehicles manufacturer in Bursa.
Karsu Tekstil	KRTEK	Textile manufacturer in Kayseri.
Karsusan	KRSAN	Seafood producer on the Black Sea.
Kartonsan	KARTN	Cardboard manufacturer.
Katılımevim	KTLEV	
Katmerciler	KATMR	Manufacturer of on-board equipment for trucks, in İzmir.
Kent Gıda	KENT	Turkish subsidiary of confectionery group, Mondelēz International.
Kerevitaş	KERVT	Frozen food producer in Bursa, owned by Yıldız Holding.
Kervansaray Holding	KERVN	Clothing manufacturer.
Kiler	KILER	Supermarket chain.
Kiler Real Estate	KLGYO	Property development subsidiary of Kiler.
Klimasan	KLMSN	Commercial refrigeration manufacturer, subsidiary of the Brazilian Metalfrio company.
Koç Holding	KCHOL	Industrial conglomerate.
Kombassan	KOMHL	Printing and manufacturing group, based in Konya.
Konfrut Gıda	KNFRT	Fruit juice concentrate, subsidiary of German company, Döhler.
Konya Çimento	KONYA	Cement producer in Konya.
Kordsa Global	KORDS	Yarn and cord manufacturer of Sabancı Holding.
Koza İpek Holding	KOZAA, KOZAL	Mining and industrial corporation.
Körfez GYO	KRGYO	Property developer belonging to Kuveyt Türk, the Turkish subsidiary of Kuwait Finance House.
Kristal Kola	KRSTL	Soft drinks manufacturer of İhlas Holding.
Kron Telekomunikasyon	KRONT	Telecommunications equipment producer.
Kuştur Club	KSTUR	Holiday resort in Kuşadası.
Kuveyt Türk Goldplus and Silverplus funds	GOLDP, SLVRP	Gold and silver tracking funds of Kuveyt Türk.
Kuyaş	KUYAS	Operators of the Kuyumcukent jewelry complex in Istanbul.
Kütahya Porselen	KUTPO	Porcelain manufacturer in Kutahya.
== L ==
Latek Logistics	LATEK	Logistics provider.
Link Bilgisayar	LINK	Business software.
Logo	LOGO	Business software.
Lokman Hekim Hospital Group	LKMNH	Private hospitals.
Lüks Kadife	LUKSK	Woven fabric manufacturer in Kayseri.
== M ==
Makina Takım	MAKTK	
Mango Gıda	MANGO	
Mardin Çimento	MRDIN	
Marmaris Altınyunus	MAALT	
Marshall	MRSHL	
Martı Real Estate	MRGYO, MARTI	
Mazhar Zorlu Holding	MZHLD	
Menderes Tekstil	MNDRS	
Mensa Mensucat	MEMSA	
Mepet Metro Petrol	MEPET	
Merit Turizm	MERIT	
Merko Gıda	MERKO	
Mert Gıda	MRTGG	
Metal Real Estate	METAL	
Metemtur	METUR	
Metro Holding	METRO	
Migros (Turkey)	MGROS	
Milpa	MIPAZ	
MMC	MMCAS	
Mondi Tire Kutsan	TIRE	
Mutlu Akü	MUTLU, MUTGG	
== N ==
Net Global	NETGL	
Net Holding	NTHOL	
Net Turizm	NTTUR	
Netaş Telekomünikasyon	NETAS	
Niğbaş	NIBAS	
Nuh Çimento	NUHCM	
Nurol Gmyo	NUGYO	
== O/Ö ==
Okan Tekstil
Olmuksa
Otokar	OTKAR	
Oyak Yat. Ort.
Oysa Çimento
Öz Finans Fact.
== P ==
Park Elektrik Madencilik	PRKME	
Parsan	PARSN	
Penguen Gıda	PENGD	
Pera Gmyo
Petkim	PETKM	
Petrokent Turizm
Petrol Ofisi	PTOFS	
Pınar Et Ve Un	PETUN	
Pınar Su
Pınar Süt
Pimaş
Plastikkart
== R ==
Ray Sigorta	RAYSG	
Reysaş GYO	RYGYO	REIT company based on warehouse building and renting.
Reysaş Lojistik	RYSAS	Logistics.
== S/Ş ==
Sağlam Gmyo		
Sanko Pazarlama
Sarkuysan	SARKY	
Selçuk Ecza Deposu	SELEC	
Selçuk Gıda
Serve Kırtasiye
Silverline Endüstri
Sinpaş Gmyo	SNGYO	Real Estate investments.
Soda Sanayii
Söktaş	SKTAS	
Sönmez Filament	SONME	Polyester manufacturing.
Sönmez Pamuklu
Şeker Fin. Kir.
Şeker Piliç
Şekerbank	SKBNK	
Şişecam	SISE	Glass manufacturing.
== T ==
T. Halk Bankası	HALKB	Major bank.
T. Kalkınma Bankasi	KLNMA	
Tacirler Yat. Ort.
Taç Yat. Ort.
Taksim Yat. Ort.
Tat Konserve
TAV Havalimanları Holding	TAVHL	Airport operations and services.
T. Demir Döküm
Tek-Art Turizm
Türk Ekonomi Bankası	TEBNK	
Tekstil Fin. Kir.
Tekstilbank	TKSTL	
Tesco Kipa	KIPA	
Tire Kutsan	TIRE	
Tofaş	TOASO	Automobile manufacturing.
Trabzonspor Sportif	TSPOR	
Trakya Cam	TRCAM	
Transtürk Holding	TRNSK	
T.S.K.B.	TSKB	
Tskb Yat. Ort.
Türk Tuborg	TBORG	
Tukaş	TUKAS	
Turcas Petrol
Turkcell	TCELL	Telecommunications.
Tümteks
TÜPRAŞ	TUPRS	Oil refineries.
Türk Hava Yolları	THYAO	Flag-carrier airline.
Türk Prysmian Kablo
Türk Traktör	TTRAK	
Türkiye İş Bankası	ISATR, ISBTR, ISCTR, ISKUR	
== U/Ü ==
Uki Konfeksiyon
Usaş
Uşak Seramik
Uzel Makina
Ülker	ULKER	Food and beverage manufacturing.
Ünye Çimento	UNYEC	
== V ==
Vakıf Fin. Kir.	VAKFN	
Vakıf Girişim
Vakıf Gmyo
Vakıf Yat. Ort.	VKBYO	
Vakıflar Bankası	VAKBN	
Vakko Tekstil	VAKKO	
Vanet
Varlık Yat. Ort.
Vestel	VESTL	Electronics manufacturing.
Vestel Beyaz Eşya	VESBE	
Viking Kağıt	VKNG	
== Y ==
Y Ve Y Gmyo
Yapı Kredi Fin. Kir.
Yapı Kredi Koray Gmyo
Yapı Kredi Sigorta	YKSGR	
Yapı Kredi Yat. O.	YKBYO	
Yapı ve Kredi Bankası	YKBNK	Major bank.
Yataş	YATAS	Beds,duvets and pillows.
Yatırım Fin. Yat.Ort.
Yazıcılar Holdıng	YAZIC	
Yünsa	YUNSA	
== Z ==
ZEDUR ENERJİ ELEKTRİK ÜRETİM A.Ş.	ZEDUR	
Zorlu Enerji	ZOREN	

== See also ==
- List of Turkish exchange-traded funds
