= ATAC =

ATAC, or Atac, may refer to:

- Airborne Tactical Advantage Company, a U.S. government contractor which operates foreign military aircraft for training purposes
- Anti-Terrorist Action Command, a fictional police organization in the 1981 movie Nighthawks
- Navy Antiterrorist Alert Center, the 1983–2002 United States Navy terrorism watch center
- "Arimidex, Tamoxifen, Alone or in Combination", an international trial of treatments for localized breast cancer
- Asbestos Testing and Consultancy Association, a UK trade association
- Assay for Transposase-Accessible Chromatin (ATAC-seq), a DNA sequencing technique
- Atac, a French supermarket chain
- ATAC SpA (Azienda per i Trasporti Autoferrotranviari del Comune di Roma), a public transport company in Rome, Italy
- Automatic targeting attack communicator, a fictional military communication device in the James Bond movie For Your Eyes Only
- Advanced Technology Airborne Computer (ATAC) was a computer used on US naval aircraft and the NASA Galileo (spacecraft).

== See also ==
- Ataç, list of people with a similar Turkish name
