= Mäkelänrinne Upper Secondary School =

Upper secondary school in Helsinki, Finland

- Mäkelänrinteen lukio Märsky

Location
- Mäkelänkatu 47; Helsinki; Finland
- Coordinates: 60.198414°N 24.948334°E

Information
- Other name: Backasbrinkens gymnasium (Swedish)
- Former names: Itäinen yhteiskoulu, 1957–1962; Mäkelänrinteen yhteiskoulu, 1962–1980
- Type: Lukio
- Established: 16 May 1957
- Authority: City of Helsinki
- Enrollment: ~1,000
  - General studies: ~350 students
  - Sports-specialized studies: ~700 students
- Language: Finnish
- Campus type: Urban
- Website: Official website (in Finnish)

Mäkelänrinne Upper Secondary School (Finnish: Mäkelänrinteen lukio; Swedish: Backasbrinkens gymnasium), commonly known by the nickname Märsky, is a co-educational upper secondary school (lukio) in the Vallila district of Helsinki, Finland. It offers sports-specialized programs in addition to general studies.

== History ==
The predecessor of Mäkelänrinne Upper Secondary School, Itäinen yhteiskoulu (lit. 'Eastern Co-educational School'), received an operating permit from the Finnish Government on 16 May 1957 and its first classes were held on 1 September of the same year. Itäinen yhteiskoulu was a lower secondary school that operated out of a wooden building in the Kallio district during its first year. The student body numbered over 600 by the school's fourth year of operation and it relocated annually to accommodate the rapid growth.

The foundation stone of the current school building on Mäkelänkatu (lit. 'Mäkelä Street') was laid 30 May 1960 and the building was fully completed in March 1961.

The school received an upper secondary school permit in 1962, at which time its name was changed to Mäkelänrinteen yhteiskoulu (lit. 'Mäkelänrinne Co-educational School'). The first graduates of Mäkelänrinne's upper secondary school graduated in the spring of 1965. Of the 24 graduates, seven had begun as students at Itäinen yhteiskoulu in 1957, the school's inaugural year of operation.

== Sports ==
It is one of fifteen upper secondary schools in Finland with designation from the Ministry of Education and Culture as an urheilulukio (lit. 'sports upper secondary school'), an institution at which students can combine general studies with specialized sports courses and physical training. Around 700 of the approximately 1,000 students attending Märsky in 2024 were in the sports-specialized program, while the remaining students were enrolled in general studies.

The Swedish-language Brändö Gymnasium is the only other sports-specialized upper secondary school in Helsinki.

=== Focus sports ===
As of 2024, Märsky offered fifteen sport specializations:

- American football
- basketball
- floorball
- football
- handball
- volleyball
- beach volleyball
- badminton
- squash
- table tennis
- diving
- swimming
- figure skating
- ice hockey
- speed skating
- golf
- orienteering
- sailing
- judo
- wrestling
- athletics
- gymnastics
- rhythmic gymnastics
- team gymnastics
- dance sport

== Notable alumni ==
- Atte Harjanne (born 1984), politician and climate scientist
- Kari Ketonen (born 1971), actor and screenwriter
- Sari Multala (born 1978), sailor and politician
- Maria Ohisalo (born 1985), politician and sociologist
- Heli Rekula (born 1963), visual artist

=== Sportspeople ===
- Mårten Boström (born 1982), orienteering competitor
- Emma Kimiläinen (born 1989), racing driver
- Aleksi Litovaara (born 1976), snowboarder
- Ville Lång (born 1985), badminton player and coach
- Sanna Nuutinen (born 1991), golfer
- Tuuli Petäjä-Sirén (born 1983), windsurfer
- Mika Poutala (born 1983), speed skater
- Joona Puhakka (born 1982), diver

Athletics

- Tommy Ekblom (born 1959), endurance runner
- Amanda Kotaja (born 1995), wheelchair racer
- Viivi Lehikoinen (born 1999), hurdler
- Ella Junnila (born 1998), high jumper

Figure skating

- Janna Jyrkinen (born 2007)

Ice hockey

- Mikael Granlund (born 1992)
- Christian Heljanko (born 1997)
- Kevin Lankinen (born 1995)
- Ville Peltonen (born 1973)
- Teemu Ramstedt (born 1987)
- Emma Terho (born 1981)
- Minttu Tuominen (born 1990)
- Sanni Vanhanen (born 2005)
- Kristian Vesalainen (born 1999)

Swimming

- Laura Lahtinen (born 2003)
- Meri-Maari Mäkinen (born 1992)
- Hanna-Maria Seppälä (born 1984)

Association football

- Michael Boamah (born 2003)
- Sixten Boström (born 1963)
- David Ezeh (born 2006)
- Kerttu Karresmaa (born 2004)
- Lotta Lindström (born 2004)
- Aki Riihilahti (born 1976)
- Tiina Salmén (born 1984)
- Rasmus Schüller (born 1991)
- Eveliina Summanen (born 1998)

Basketball

- Fiifi Aidoo (born 1996)
- Shawn Huff (born 1984)
- Awak Kuier (born 2001)
- Petteri Koponen (born 1988)
- Lauri Markkanen (born 1997)
- Edon Maxhuni (born 1998)
- Michaela Moua (born 1976)
- Hanno Möttölä (born 1976)
- Olivier Nkamhoua (born 2000)
- Elias Valtonen (born 1999)

Rhythmic gymnastics

- Aurora Arvelo (born 2003)
- Jouki Tikkanen (born 1995)
- Ekaterina Volkova (born 1997)

Tennis

- Harri Heliövaara (born 1989)
- Katariina Tuohimaa (born 1988)

=== Märsky of the Year ===
The Märsky of the Year (Finnish: Vuoden Märsky) honor is annually awarded to a Mäkelänrinne Upper Secondary School alumnus on the basis of success in post-secondary studies, sport, or professional life, with consideration paid to admirable personal qualities. A jury of Mäkelänrinne Upper Secondary School alumni and teaching staff make the selection.

2000: Hanno Möttölä (graduated 1996), basketball player
2001: Marja-Liisa Pihlström (graduated 1983), international hotel executive
2002: Heli Rekula (graduated 1983), visual artist
2003: Hanna-Maria Seppälä (graduated in 2003), swimmer
2004: Mikael Pentikäinen (graduated c.1984), journalist and editor
2005: Aki Riihilahti (graduated 1995), association football player
2006: Heikki Lehtonen (graduated 1975), CEO of Componenta
2007: Anu Oksanen (graduated 1984), head coach of Marigold IceUnity
2008: Sari Multala (graduated 1997), sailor and politician
2009: Marjo T. Nurminen (graduated 1986), journalist and non-fiction writer
2010: Ville Peltonen (graduated 1993), ice hockey player
2011: Paula Heinonen (graduated 1980), biotechnologist and nutritionist
2012: Tuuli Petäjä-Sirén (graduated 2002), windsurfer
2013: Mårten Boström (graduated 2002), orienteering competitor
2014: Jan Lassus (graduated 1985), surgeon
2015: Juha Auvinen (graduated 1983), diplomat and DG ECHO unit head
2016: Kaisa Lehtonen (graduated 2001), triathlete
2017: Michaela Moua (graduated 1996), basketball player and civic activist
2018: Sami Pihlström (graduated 1988), philosopher and philosophy of religion professor
2019: Maria Ohisalo (graduated 2004), politician and poverty researcher
2020: Jari-Pekka Keurulainen (graduated 1975), football coach and physiotherapist
2021: Emma Terho (graduated 2000), ice hockey player and executive, sports influencer
2022: Shawn Huff (graduated c.2004) & Petteri Koponen (graduated 2007), basketball players
2023: Anna Eronen (graduated 1997), naval officer and aide-de-camp to the President of Finland
2024: Harri Heliövaara (graduated 2009), tennis player
