= Desa (company) =

Turkish leather goods producer and retailer

DESA DERİ SANAYİ VE TİCARET A.Ş.
- Traded as: BİST: DESA
- Industry: Leather goods
- Founded: 1972
- Headquarters: Istanbul, Turkey
- Area served: Turkey and the UK
- Key people: Melih Çelet (founder)
- Revenue: ▼ ₺2.44 billion (2023)
- Operating income: ▲ ₺618 million (2023)
- Net income: ▲ ₺496 million (2023)
- Total assets: ▲ ₺2.59 billion (2023)
- Total equity: ▲ ₺1.62 billion (2023)
- Number of employees: 1,536
- Website: www.desa.com.tr

Desa is a Turkish leather goods producer and retailer, offering leather jackets, shoes, bags and accessories, backpacks, suitcases, and other leather products such as horse saddles.

== History ==
The company was founded in Istanbul by chemistry student Melih Çelet in 1972 to produce leather goods for export and the local market through Desa's own retail outlets. The New York office was opened in 1986 and today Desa exports leather clothing and accessories to the US and Europe. Today, Desa has factories in Istanbul and Düzce, their own tannery in Çorlu, 70 retail stores in Turkey. As well as their own brands Desa also produces goods for international brands.

The company has also been a Turkish distributor of the Samsonite brand since the 1980s.

A 30% share of Desa was floated on the Istanbul Stock Exchange in 2004, where they are traded as Desa Deri Sanayi ve Ticaret A.S (DESA.IS). Desa is a subsidiary of Çelet Holding A.S.
