= Escort Teknoloji =

ESCORT TEKNOLOJİ YATIRIM A.Ş.
- Traded as: BİST: ESCOM
- Industry: Technology
- Founded: 1991
- Headquarters: Turkey
- Key people: Ibrahim Özer (chairman).
- Products: Computers
- Services: Manufacture, retailing.
- Revenue: ▲ ₺936.1 million (2023)
- Operating income: ▼ ₺925.8 million (2023)
- Net income: ▲ ₺384.4 million (2023)
- Total assets: ▲ ₺1.79 billion (2023)
- Total equity: ▲ ₺1.76 billion (2023)
- Number of employees: 549
- Subsidiaries: 12
- Website: www.escort.com.tr/Eng/Default.aspx

Escort is a Turkish computer manufacturer and Consumer electronics retail chain.

== History ==
The company was founded in 1991 as a computer manufacturer, growing to provide a supply service through its own network of retail stores. As of 2014, Escort consisted of twelve subsidiary companies providing services in: software development, consulting, sales and marketing, distribution of Toshiba home electronics, software and equipment for the banking industry. Shares in Escort Teknoloji Yatırım A.Ş have been traded on the Istanbul Stock Exchange since 2000.
