= Paşabahçe =

Turkish glassware and homeware manufacturer and retailer

- Industry: Retailing
- Headquarters: Tuzla, Istanbul, Turkey
- Number of locations: 50 stores, 9 offices outside Turkey (June 2024)
- Area served: Turkey: Istanbul (26 stores); Ankara (5); İzmir (4); Antalya (2); Bursa (2); Adana; Denizli; Eskişehir; Gaziantep; Bodrum; Mersin; Başiskele (Kocaeli); Konya; Qatar: Doha Festival City; Pearl Island; Saudi Arabia: Riyadh Park; Via e-commerce only: Europe: All 30 European Union and EEA countries (for Cyprus, only the TRNC-controlled north); Other Europe: Albania, Bosnia and Herzegovina, Faroe Islands, Georgia, Moldova, North Macedonia, Switzerland, United Kingdom; Egypt, Jordan, Tunisia, Chile
- Products: Glass art, glassware, dishware, flatware, serveware, tea/coffee services and accessories, kitchenware, home accessories, textiles, bar accessories, glass charms/icons, lokum
- Brands: Paşabahçe
- Owner: Şişecam
- Parent: Şişecam
- Website: store.pasabahce.com

Paşabahçe (pron. "pah-shah-BAH-che", lit. "pasha's garden") is a chain of around 50 retail stores selling glass art, glassware, crystal, and other homeware, based in the Tuzla district of Istanbul, Turkey, part of the Şişecam company. It is named after the village of Paşabahçe that historically was famous for its glass furnaces. It features many designed inspired by Ottoman-era glasswork.

== History ==
In 1935, Kemal Atatürk, the founder of modern Turkey, ordered the bank İşbank to found Pasabahçe in Beykoz to supply basic glassware for the country. The first products were glassware made from soda glass. In 1955, Şişecam adopted machine production, marking the first stage of today's automated production technology. In 1974, Şişecam began producing heat-resistant glassware. The company's modern retail stores launched in 1957. The wholesale and (starting in 1961) export businesses substantially expanded over the decades.

Şişecam now manufactures in Bulgaria, Russia and Egypt as well.

Şişecam targets household, catering, and industrial segments with over 20,000 different products, specializing in automated production as well as handmade products. Today, Şişecam has a huge customer base across 140 countries with its global production of glassware.

Besides Paşabahçe Stores, Şişecam's brands includes Nude, Borcam and Zest Glass.

== Branches ==
As of June 2024, there are 50 Paşabahçe stores, of which 47 in Turkey. 26 stores are in Istanbul of which 23 in malls, plus stores at Istanbul Airport, along prestigious Bağdat Avenue, and at the Atatürk Cultural Center. 5 stores operate in Ankara, 4 in İzmir, 2 each in Antalya and Bursa, and 1 each in Adana, Denizli, Eskişehir, Gaziantep, Bodrum, Mersin, Başiskele (Kocaeli) and Konya. Two operate outside Turkey, both in Qatar, one at Doha Festival City and another at Porto Arabia on The Pearl Island. There is 1 store in Saudi Arabia at Riyadh Park mall.

In April 2024, Paşabahçe opened a store in the Atatürk Cultural Center (AKM) near Taksim Square in Istanbul. Unlike its other branches, this Paşabahçe store sells only hand-made products.

== Gallery ==
Examples of historically inspired pieces

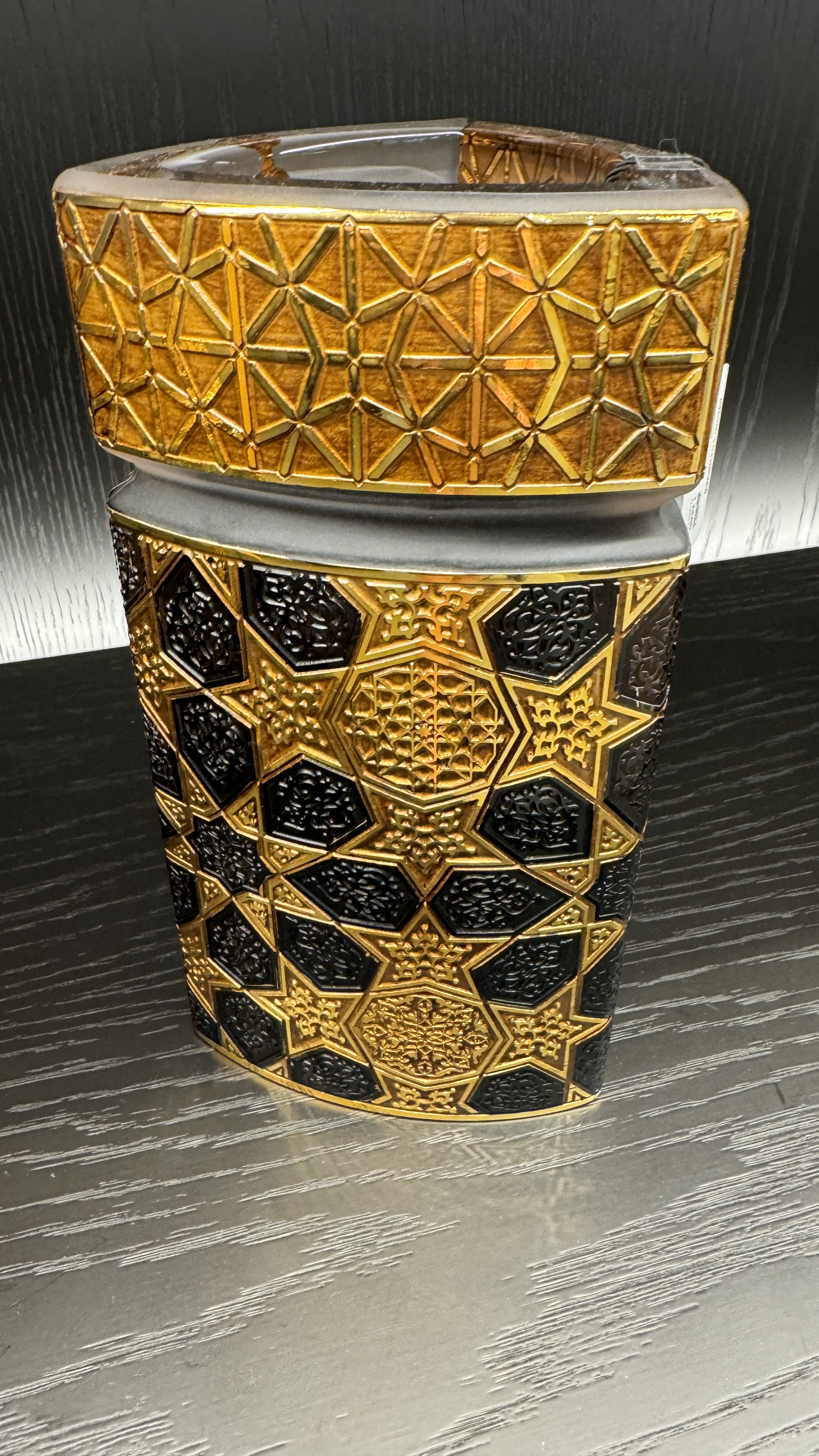

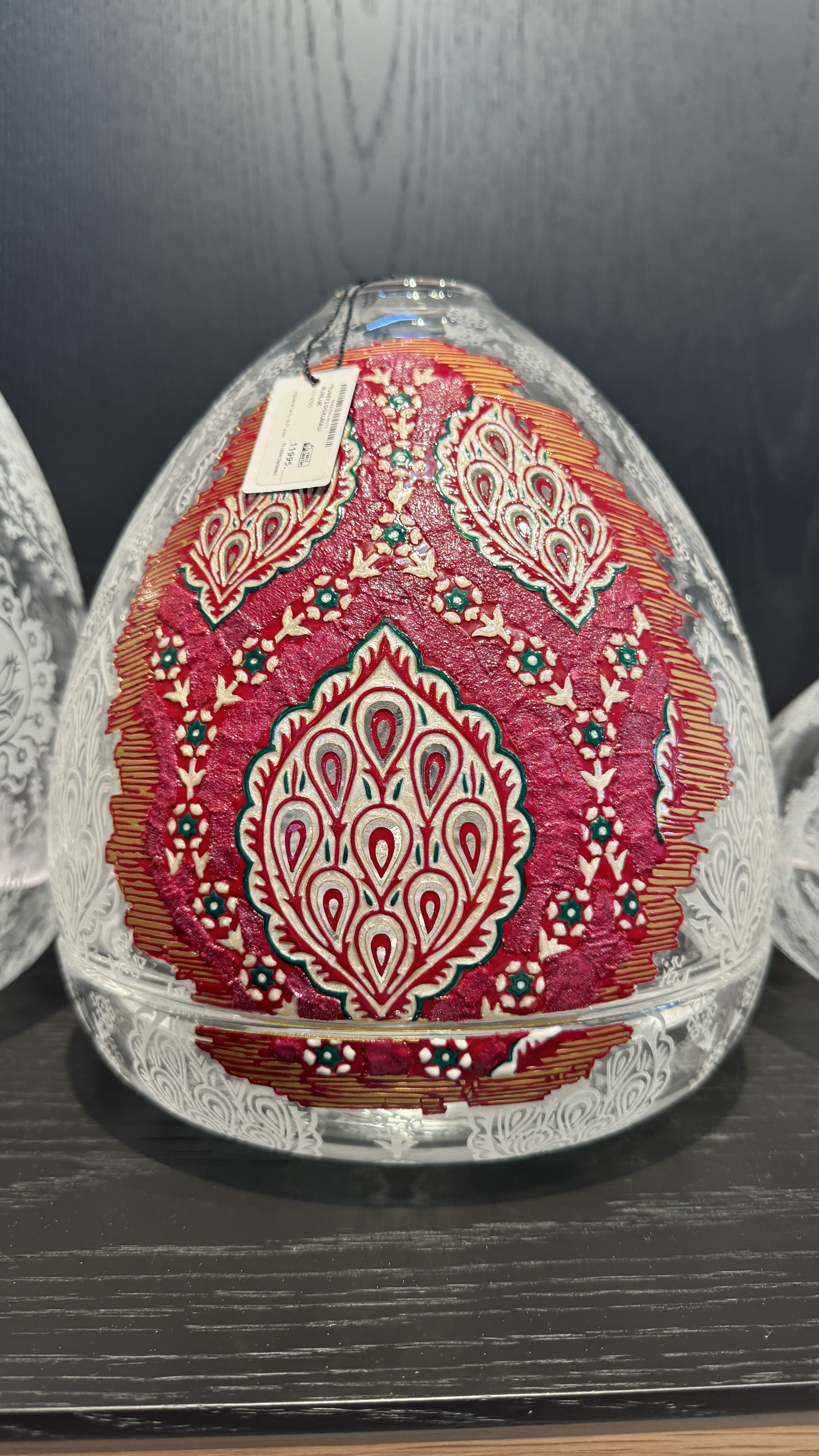

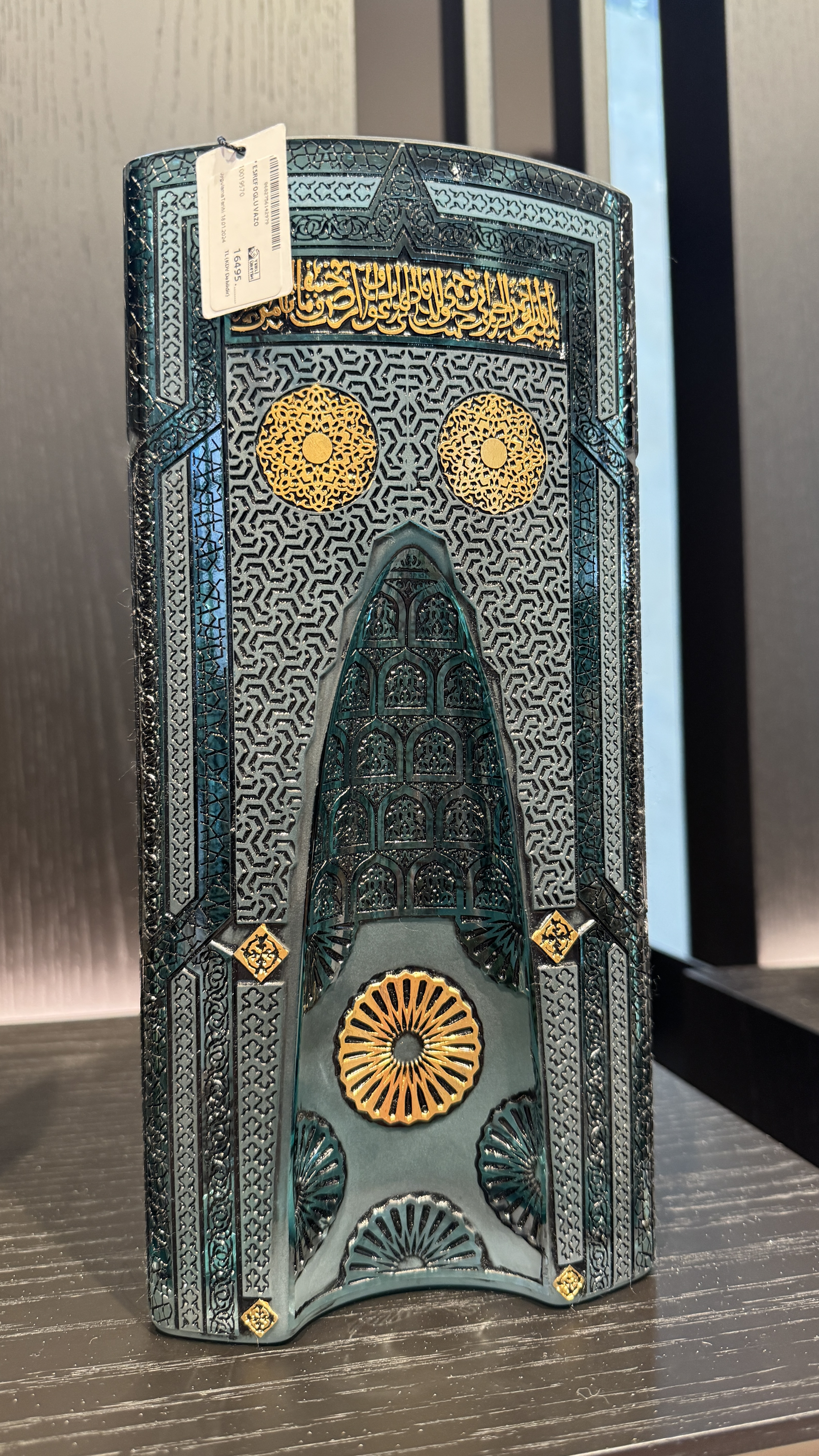

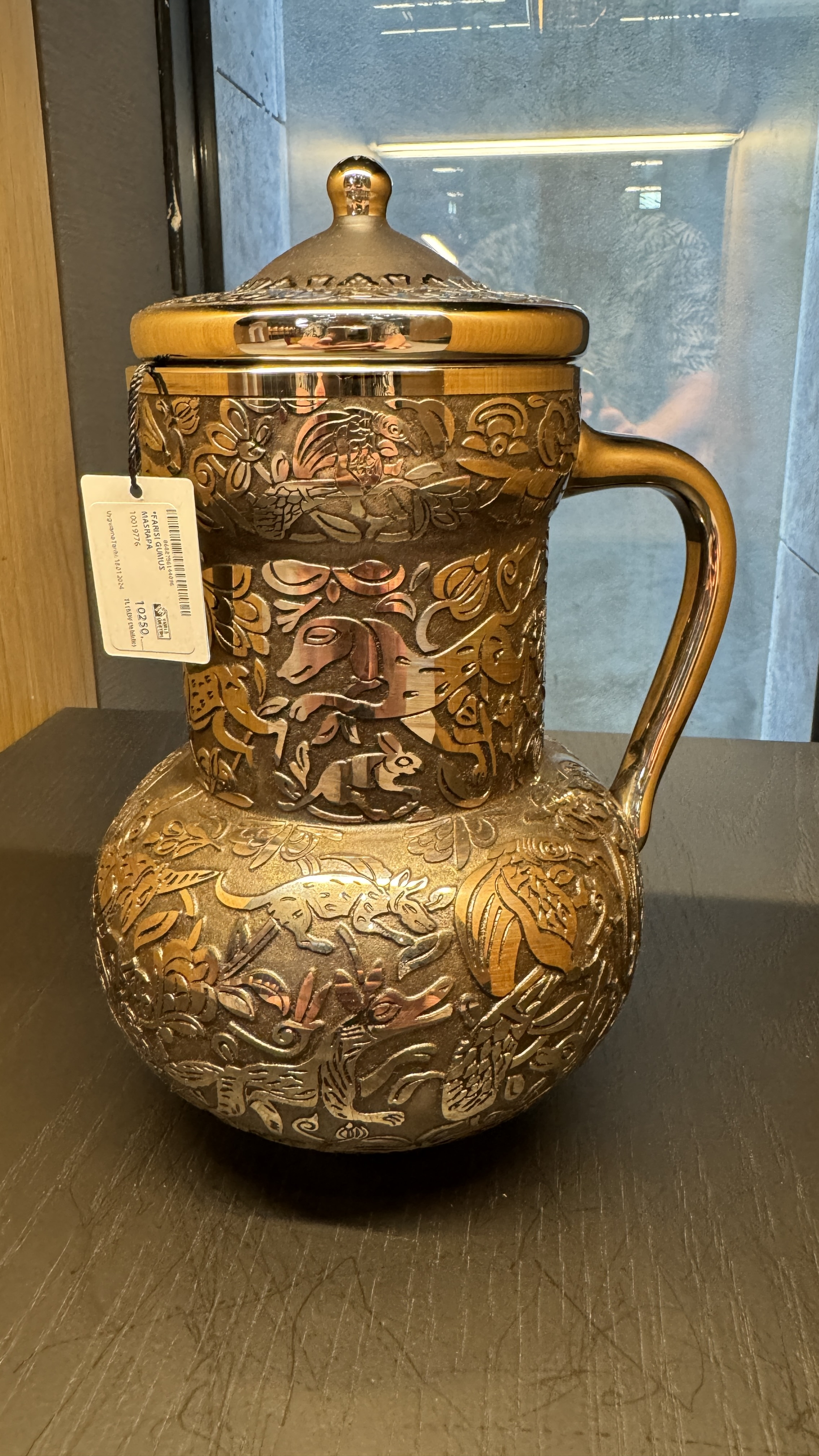

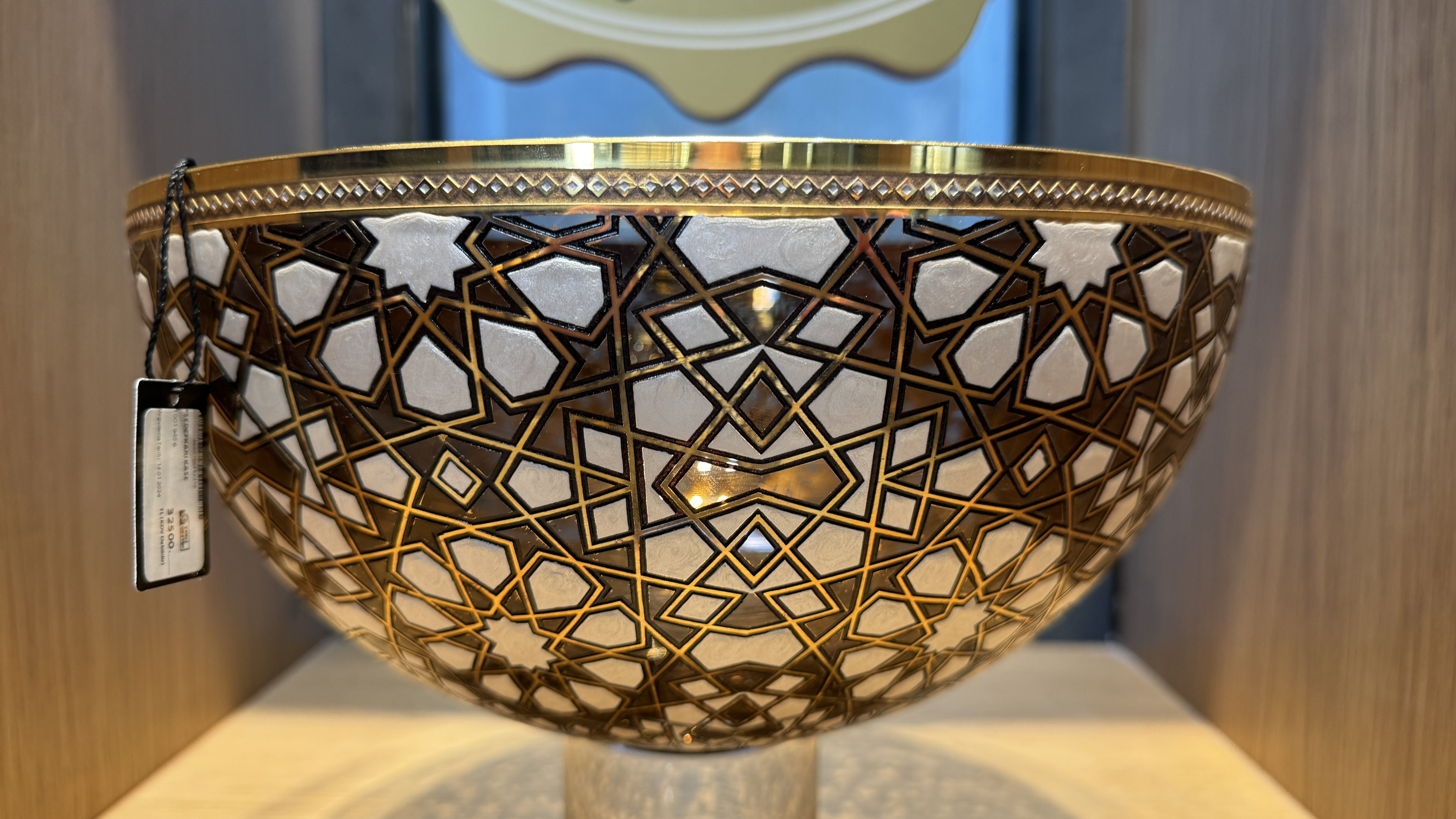

Paşabahçe store at Atatürk Kültür Merkezi

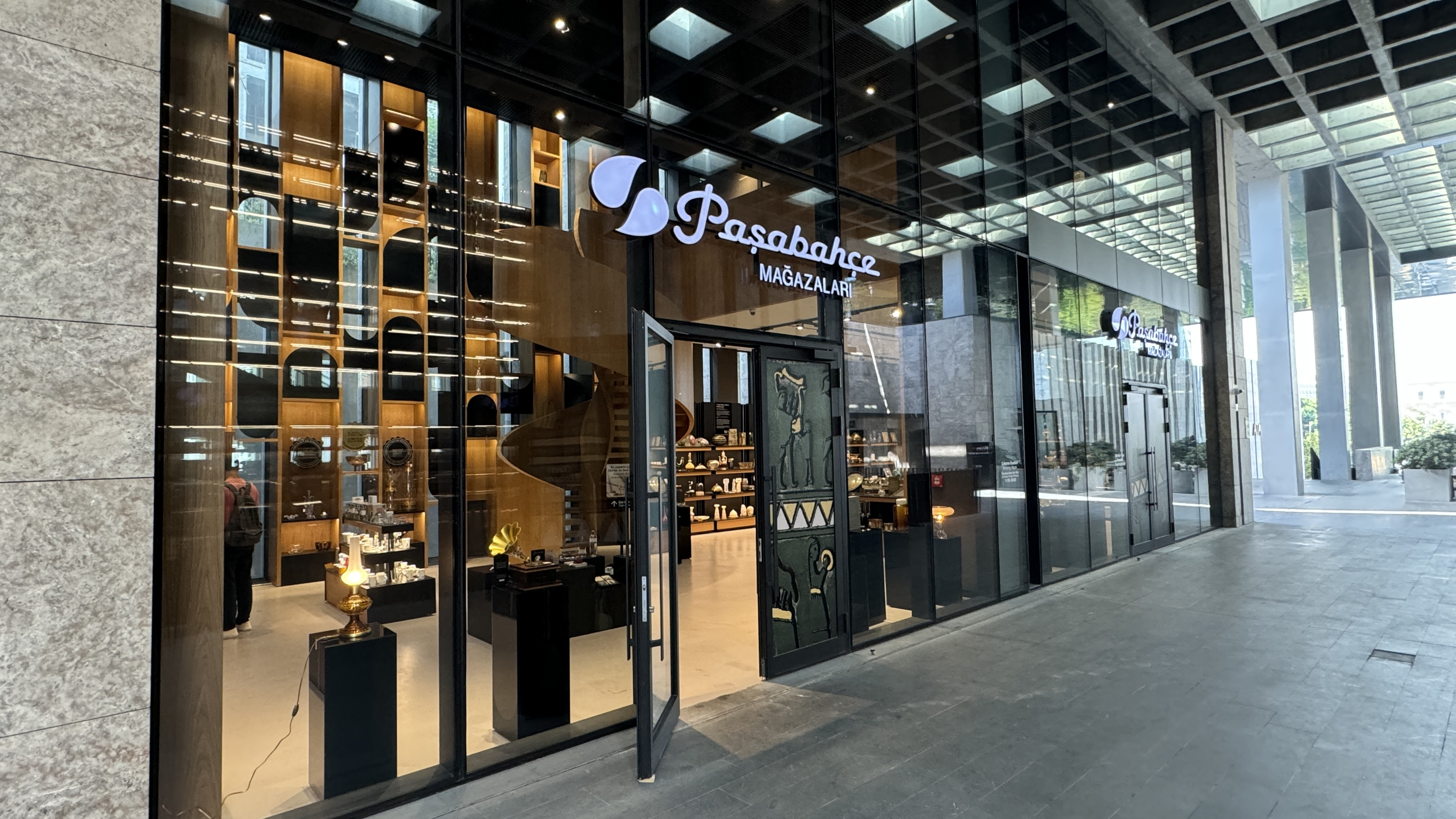

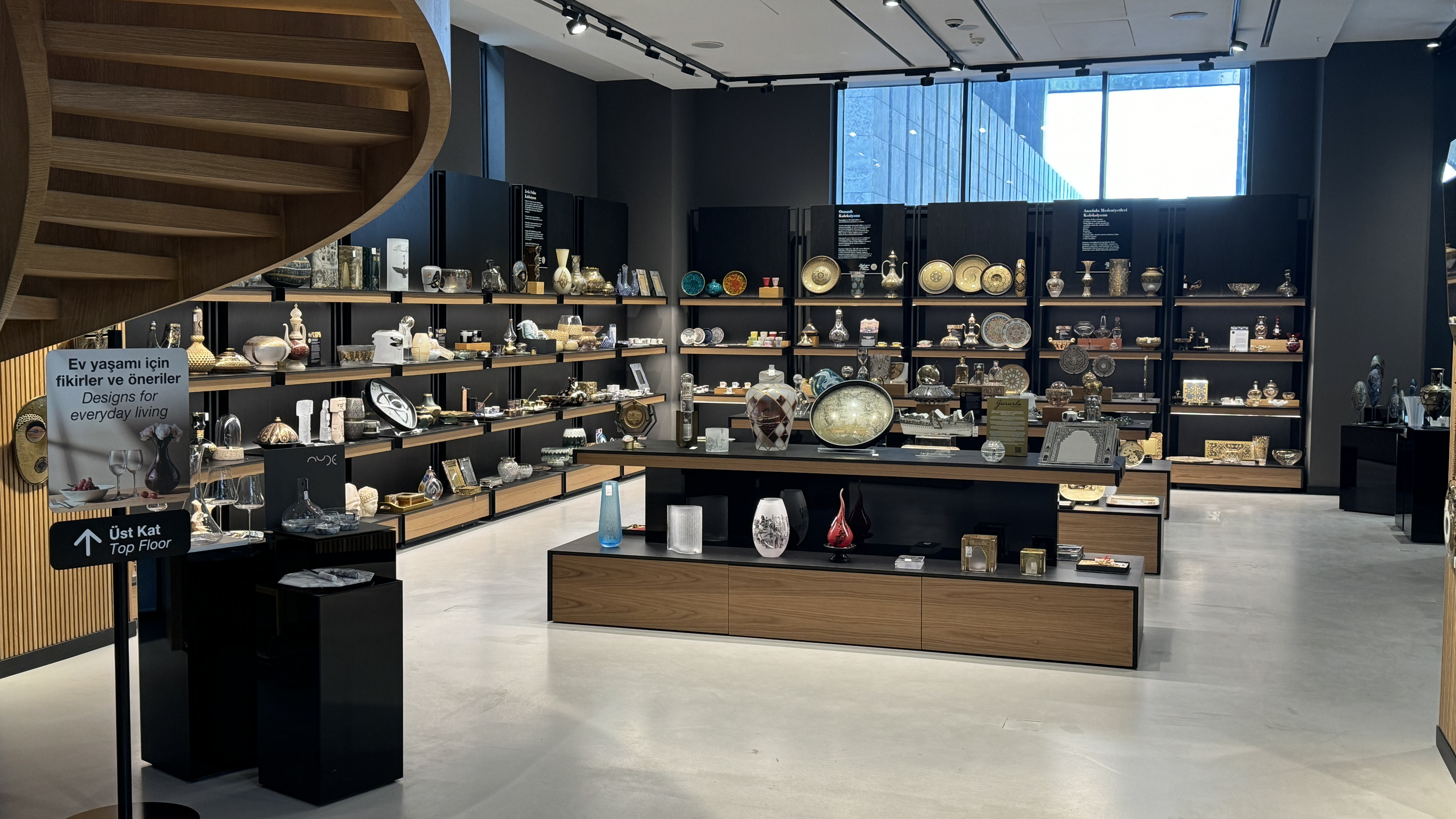
