= Air Alfa =

Turkish charter airline

IATA	ICAO	Call sign
H7	LFA	AIR ALFA
- Founded: 1992
- Commenced operations: 1992
- Ceased operations: December 2001
- Operating bases: Antalya Airport; Atatürk International Airport (Hub)
- Fleet size: 21 (whole fleet operated)
- Headquarters: Atatürk International Airport, Turkey
- Website: www.airalfa.com

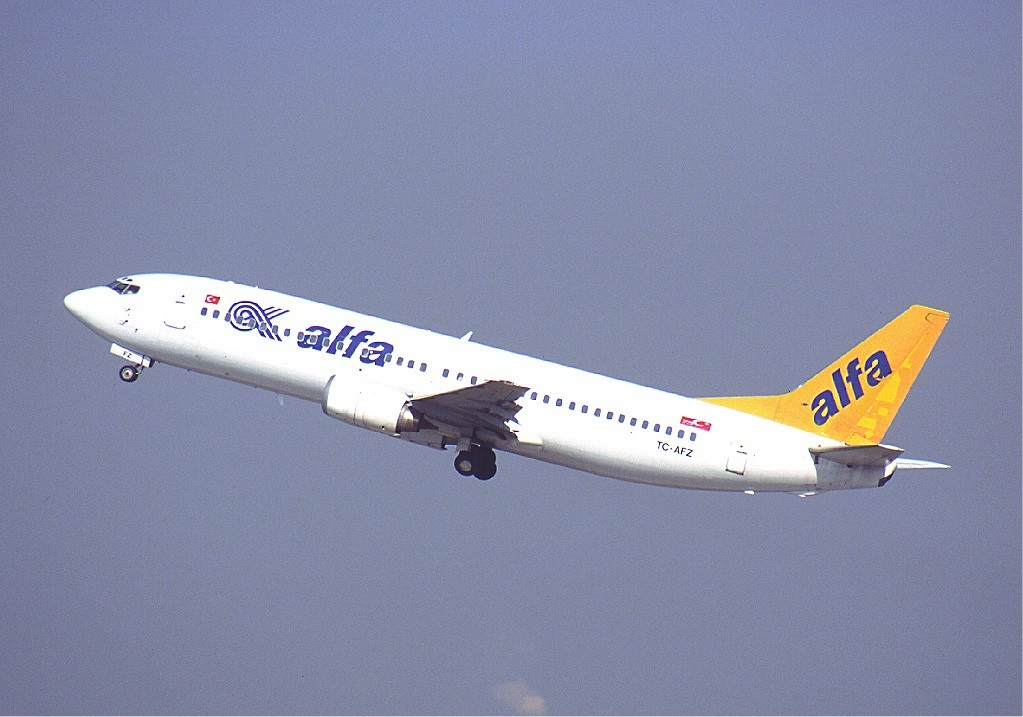
A Boeing 737-400, leased from Pegasus

AirAlfa was a charter airline based in Atatürk International Airport, Istanbul, Turkey. It also had an additional base at Antalya Airport. It also operated charter services to tour operators. Air Alfa ceased operations in December 2001 and had its licence revoked on 17 November 2002.

== History ==
Air Alfa was founded in 1992 and started operating flights between Turkey and Western Europe. However, the airline was grounded for the rest of 1992 because it did not meet the rules of the Turkish Civil Aviation Authority. This was because it handled less than three aircraft, being Boeing 727-200s. The Airline restarted flights in 1993, leasing a Boeing 737. Air Alfa also operated exclusive full charter flights (tourist flights, guest worker flights) to partner tour operators such as Nazar Reisen in Germany and Sultan Reizen in the Netherlands.

In 1994, the airline started long haul flights by receiving its first Airbus A300, and was joined by a second which was leased from EgyptAir. A further six were added in the following years, but reduced to five after the accident of an Air Alfa Flight in Istanbul. During 1996, Air Alfa carried one million passengers for the first time.

== Acquisitions ==
In December 1996, the airline was acquired from Kombassan, and the fleet was modernised with new Airbus A321-100's, with an Airbus A300B4-203 and a Boeing 727-200 being retired.

In 1996, Air Alfa was acquired by Kombassan. In 2000, Air Alfa started to struggle and have financial difficulties, cutting back and reducing schedules until its end in 2001. The airline restarted in 2002 under the name 'Alpha Airlines', but this was quickly forgotten as it ceased operations and filed for bankruptcy on 17 November 2002.

== Incidents ==
On 17 May 1996, an Air Alfa Airbus A300B4-203 (Registration TC-ALP) was set alight at Istanbul Atatürk Airport. There were no fatalities as it was empty at the time. The aircraft was destroyed and written off.

== See also ==
- List of defunct airlines of Turkey
