= Kütahya Porselen =

Turkish porcelain and ceramics company

KÜTAHYA PORSELEN SANAYİİ A.Ş.
- Traded as: BİST: KUTPO
- Industry: Manufacturing
- Founded: 1970
- Headquarters: Kütahya, Turkey
- Key people: Nafi Güral (founder)
- Products: Ceramics
- Revenue: ▲ ₺2.34 billion (2023)
- Operating income: ▲ ₺326 million (2023)
- Net income: ▲ ₺38 million (2023)
- Total assets: ▲ ₺2.73 billion (2023)
- Total equity: ▲ ₺2.04 billion (2023)
- Website: www.kutahyaporselen.com.tr

Kütahya Porselen is a Turkish porcelain and ceramics manufacturer in the city of Kütahya.

== History ==
The company was founded in 1970, though pottery has long been made in the region. As well as making pottery for sale to the retail and hotel trade in Turkey and abroad, Kütahya Porselen also operates 43 shops in Turkey and manufactures and installs factory equipment for other ceramic producers. A 25% shareholding was floated on the Istanbul Stock Exchange in 1984.

== See also ==
- NG Grup
