= BIST 100 =

Blue chip stock market index

- Foundation: 1986
- Exchanges: Borsa Istanbul
- Constituents: 100
- Type: Large cap
- Market cap: 247.8 billion US$ (2024)
- Weighting method: Capitalization-weighted
- Related indices: BIST 30, BIST 50
- Website: BIST 100 homepage

The BIST 100 is the most important Turkish stock index. The abbreviation BIST stands for Borsa Istanbul (Istanbul Stock Exchange). The BIST 100 provides information on the share price performance of the 100 largest companies on the Istanbul Stock Exchange. It thus reflects the market segment for Turkish blue chips and is the leading index for the Turkish stock market.

== Index ==
The BIST 100 is a price index and contains the 100 largest Turkish stocks weighted by market capitalization. The index level is determined exclusively on the basis of share prices. Dividend payments are not included in the calculation of the index. The BIST 100 has been calculated since January 1, 1986. The index base was initially 100 points. With effect from December 27, 1996, the index was divided by 100, setting the 1986 base value at 1 point. With effect from July 27, 2020, the index was divided by 100 again, setting the base value from 1986 at 0.01 point. The index is calculated in Turkish lira, which has been very inflationary in the past.

== Composition ==
The 10 largest positions in the index were in February 2024:

- Turkish Airlines
- Tüpraş
- Bim
- Akbank
- Koç Holding
- Sabancı Holding
- Turkcell
- İşbank
- Şişecam
- Erdemir

== Annual returns ==
The following table shows the annual development of the BIST 100 since 1990.

Year	Closing level	Change in index in points	Change in index in %
1990	0.33		
1991	0.44	0.11	34.18
1992	0.40	−0.04	−8.35
1993	2.07	1.67	416.56
1994	2.73	0.66	31.78
1995	4.00	1.28	46.84
1996	9.76	5.76	143.82
1997	34.51	24.75	253.65
1998	25.98	−8.53	−24.73
1999	152.09	126.11	485.42
2000	94.37	−57.72	−37.95
2001	137.83	43.46	46.05
2002	103.70	−34.13	−24.76
2003	186.25	82.55	79.61
2004	249.72	63.47	34.08
2005	397.78	148.06	59.29
2006	391.17	−6.60	−1.66
2007	555.38	164.21	41.98
2008	268.64	−286.74	−51.63
2009	528.25	259.61	96.64
2010	660.04	131.79	24.95
2011	512.67	−147.38	−22.33
2012	782.08	269.42	52.55
2013	678.02	−104.07	−13.31
2014	857.21	179.19	26.43
2015	717.27	−139.94	−16.33
2016	781.39	64.12	8.94
2017	1,153.31	371.92	47.60
2018	912.70	−240.61	−20.86
2019	1,144.25	231.55	25.37
2020	1,476.72	332.47	29.06
2021	1,857.65	380.93	25.80
2022	5,509.16	3,651.51	196.57
2023	7,470.18	1,961.02	35.60
2024	9,830.56	2,360.38	31.60

== See also ==
- Economy of Turkey
- Borsa Istanbul
- List of Turkish companies
- List of companies listed on the Istanbul Stock Exchange
