= Alarko Carrier =

- Traded as: BİST: ALCAR
- Industry: Manufacturing
- Founded: 1954
- Founder: Ishak Alaton Uzeyir Garih
- Headquarters: Gebze, Turkey
- Products: Wall hung boilers, Domestic boilers, Boilers, Burners, Panel radiators, Circulation pumps, Pressure tanks, Air handling units, Fan-coil units, Air heater units, Cooling groups, Water cooling towers, Submersible pumps and motors, Water softener systems, Water pressure systems.
- Services: Sales and marketing
- Revenue: ▲₺5.542 billion (2023)
- Operating income: ▲ ₺549.6 million (2023)
- Net income: ▼ ₺411.4 million (2023)
- Total assets: ▼ ₺3.861 billion (2023)
- Total equity: ▲ ₺1.491 billion (2023)
- Owner: Alarko and Carrier Corporation
- Number of employees: 575
- Website: www.alarko-carrier.com.tr

Alarko Carrier is a manufacturing company in Turkey, operating in the fields of heating, cooling, air conditioning, water purification and pressurization. Established in 1954, Alarko Sanayi ve Ticaret A.Ş. established in 1998 an equal partnership with Carrier and the company's name was changed to Alarko Carrier Industry and Trade Co. Inc.

== Area of activity ==
Manufacturing takes place in the main plant in Gebze, near Istanbul, and the radiator plant in Istanbul itself. The head office is on the Gebze site with sales offices around the country.

Recent projects include: in 2014 Carrier 39HQ air handling units manufactured at the Gebze Plant were purchased for Concourse 4 of Dubai International Airport, the largest airport in the world; appropriate indoor environment conditions for the protection of the valuable mosaics in Şanlıurfa Museum of Archaeology and Haleplibahçe Mosaic Museum, Turkey's largest museum complex being built in the city of Şanlıurfa; an Aquaforce water-cooled chiller for Azerbaijan’s largest cannery in Bilesuvar in southeast Azerbaijan; many hotels and office buildings including the Renaissance İstanbul Bosphorus, Shangri-La Bosphorus, Liv Hospital Ulus; and the Leadership in Energy and Environmental Design-gold certified RönesansBiz building in Istanbul.

== Board of directors ==
Cem Akan	General Manager.
Ömer Çelik	Senior Vice-president, finance.
