= Emlak Konut =

Turkish real estate developer

EMLAK KONUT GAYRİMENKUL YATIRIM ORTAKLIĞI A.Ş.
- Traded as: BİST: EKGYO
- Industry: Real estate
- Founded: 1987
- Headquarters: Turkey
- Revenue: ▲US$1.006 billion (2023)
- Operating income: ▼US$127.2 million (2023)
- Net income: ▲US$143.8 million (2023)
- Total assets: ▲US$5.201 billion (2023)
- Total equity: ▲US$2.379 billion (2023)
- Parent: The Housing Development Administration of Turkey (TOKI)
- Website: emlakkonut.com.tr/en-US

Emlak Konut is a Turkish real estate developer owned by TOKİ.

== History ==
Emlak Konut was formed in 1987 as a subsidiary of Emlak Bank, from property developer Ankara İmar Ltd, which had been founded in 1953. The company specialised in housing projects throughout Turkey. In 2002, with the liquidation of the failed Emlak Bank, ownership of the property company passed to TOKİ, but Emlak Konut has remained profitable without need of further subsidy from TOKİ.

In 2010, shares of Emlak Konut were publicly offered on the Istanbul Stock Exchange.
