= Şişecam =

Turkish glass manufacturing company

Türkiye Şişe ve Cam Fabrikaları A.Ş.
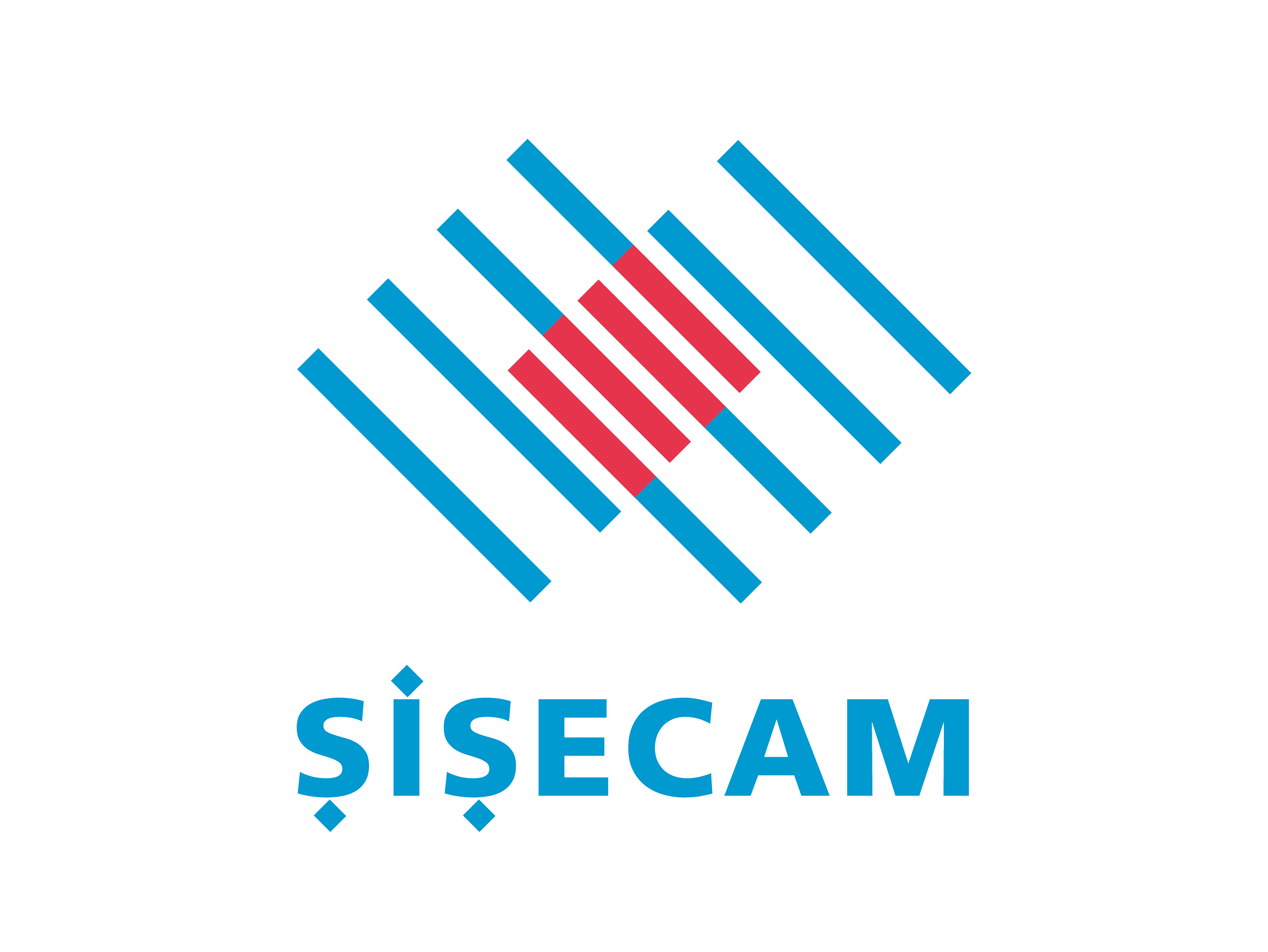
- Type: Public (A.Ş.)
- Industry: Glass industry
- Founded: 1935; 91 years ago
- Headquarters: Tuzla, Istanbul, Turkey
- Revenue: ▲US$5.33 billion (2023)
- Operating income: ▼US$552.14 million (2023)
- Net income: ▼US$666.64 million (2023)
- Total assets: ▲US$11.35 billion (2023)
- Total equity: ▲US$7.18 billion (2023)
- Number of employees: 24,952 (2023)
- Website: www.sisecam.com/en

Şişecam (official name: Türkiye Şişe ve Cam Fabrikaları) is a Turkish glass manufacturing company. In the 2020 fiscal year, the company operated 43 plants in 14 countries. In terms of production capacity, Şişecam is the largest flat glass manufacturer in Europe and the world's second-largest manufacturer of glass household goods such as drinking glasses according to its own estimates. The product range is supplemented by the production of packaging glass. The company is part of the BIST 100 index of the 100 largest companies listed on the Istanbul Stock Exchange by market capitalization. Around 50% of shares are owned by İşbank. Şişecam owns the Paşabahçe chain of retail glassware and homeware stores.

== History ==
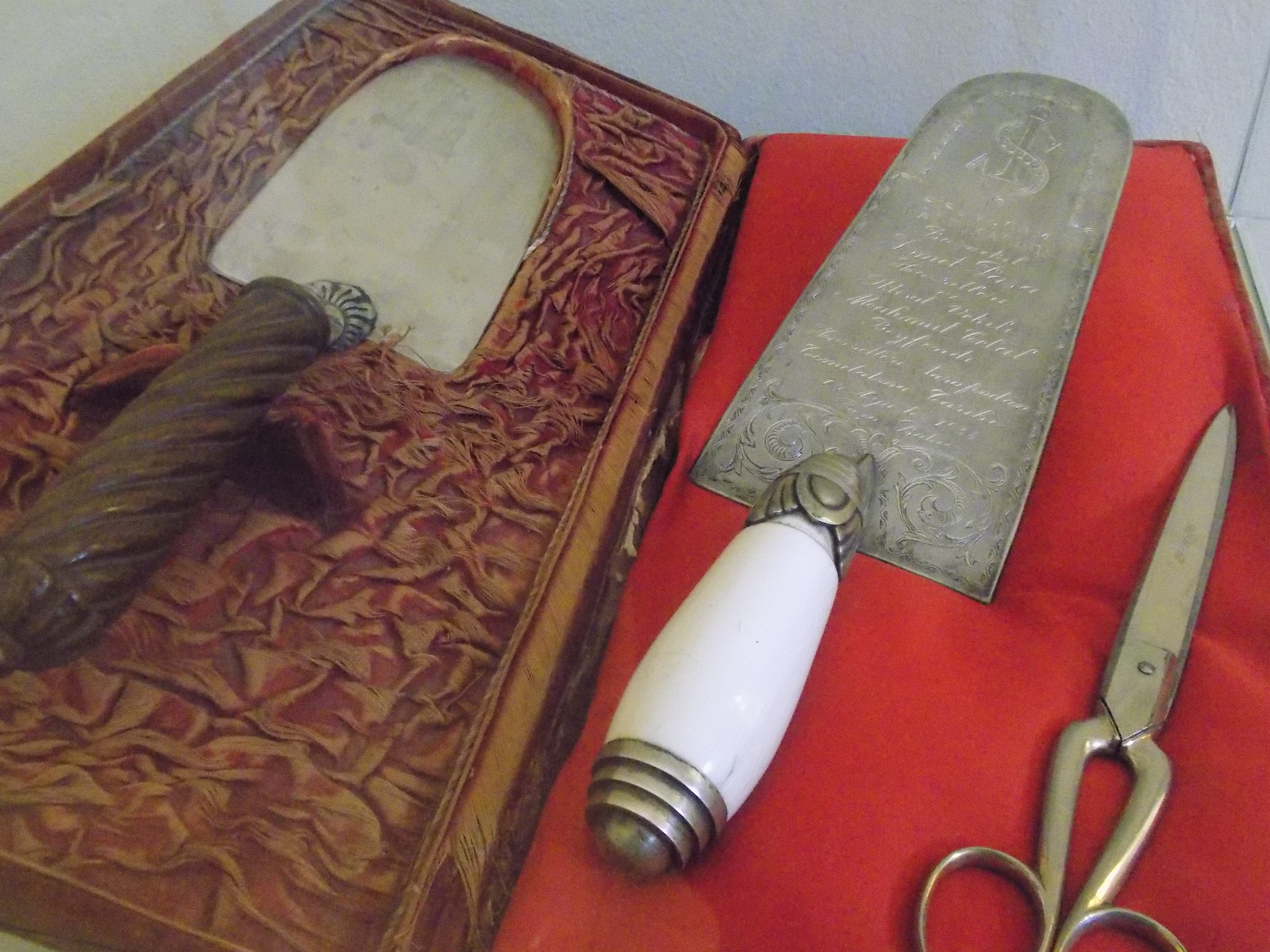
The trowels used in the groundbreaking ceremony of the factory, and the scissors used in the opening are exhibited in the İşbank Museum.

The company was founded following a decision by the Council of Ministers, which Kemal Atatürk was behind, in 1934. This decision entrusted Türkiye İş Bankası with the task of developing the Turkish glass industry. The following year, the company Türkiye Şişe ve Cam Fabrikaları Anonim Sosyetesi was officially founded and the glassworks in Paşabahçe was able to start operations. The foundation stone for the plant there was laid back in 1934 by Prime Minister İsmet İnönü and Minister of Economy Celâl Bayar. At the time of its opening, the glassworks had a workforce of around 400 employees and a daily production capacity of 25,000 glass bottles. In 1957, two retail stores were established in Istanbul and Ankara to sell glassware directly, which are now the Paşabahçe chain, with stores operating across Türkiye and in Qatar.

From 1961, window glass with an annual capacity of 19,000 tons was produced in a glass factory in Çayırova. The establishment of a joint plant with Schott AG under the name TACAM in 1966 led to the production of glass tubing and laboratory equipment. In the same year, the production of automotive glass began at the Çayırova plant. In 1971, Şişecam entered the production of glass fabrics and glass fiber reinforced components. The first glass fiber mats produced were used in the domestic production of Anadol brand automobiles, among other things. Over time, the product portfolio was expanded to include other glass applications such as borosilicate glass, tempered glass products and glass for televisions. From the 1970s, Şişecam also entered the mining and production of basic materials such as chrome chemicals, sand, dolomite, feldspar, limestone and soda.

In 2013, Şişecam took over the German automotive supplier Richard Fritz, based in Besigheim.

== Criticism of relationship with Russia ==
Şişecam was criticized for continuing its business operations in Russia during the ongoing war in Ukraine. As of May 2023, the company had sold only one of its five subsidiaries in Russia. The sale was reportedly made to a Netherlands-based company, Trakya Investment B.V., which raised questions about whether it was an internal transfer rather than a genuine exit.

Despite the war and international pressure, Şişecam remains the largest importer in its industry in Russia. In 2023, due to its ongoing business relations with Russia after the Russian invasion of Ukraine, Şişecam was added to the list of sponsors of the Russian war by the Ukrainian National Agency for the Prevention of Corruption.

== See also ==
- Paşabahçe (retail stores)
