= Hektaş =

- Company type: Public

Hektaş is a manufacturer of fertilizer and other farm products. It is a BIST 30 company on the Turkish stock market and at risk from the EU Carbon Border Adjustment Mechanism. Share trading was suspended after the 2023 Turkey–Syria earthquake.
