= Dardanel =

Food packager

Dardanel Örentaş Gıda Sanayi A.Ş
- Traded as: BİST: DARDL
- Industry: Food packaging
- Founded: 1984
- Headquarters: Çanakkale, Turkey
- Area served: Turkey and Cyprus
- Revenue: 278.18 million US$ (2023)
- Website: www.dardanel.com.tr

Dardanel is a Turkish food packager based in the town of Çanakkale, Turkey, on the Dardanelles strait.

== History ==
=== 1984–1999 ===
The company was founded in 1984 by Niyazi Önen as Turkey's first producer of canned tuna, and was listed on the Istanbul Stock Exchange in 1994. From the 1990s the product range expanded from the "Dardanel Ton" canned tuna to other canned foods and ready-made sandwiches. Dardanel is authorized to use the Dolphin Safe badge on its products.

In 1991, the company started sponsoring the football club Çanakkale Dardanelspor A.Ş, and has been a sponsor ever since.

=== 2010s–present ===
In 2011, the company opened a fish and bread restaurant chain called Dardenia, with the first restaurant being opened on Bağdat Avenue.

In 2021, Dardanel acquired the Greek seafood company G. Kallimanis for 6.2 million euros.
