= Kent Gıda =

Turkish confectionery company

- Type: Public company
- Industry: Food manufacturing
- Founded: 1927
- Headquarters: Gebze, Turkey
- Area served: Turkey
- Products: Confectionery
- Parent: Mondelēz International
- Website: tr.mondelezinternational.com

Kent Gıda is a Turkish confectionery company owned by Mondelez International (spun off from Kraft Foods) since 2012.

== History ==
The company was founded on 1958, 1958, however according to its official website history dates back to 1927 when members of the Tahinçoğlu family began producing tahini in Mardin. In 1956, production moved to Istanbul. It was then that the company was renamed Kent, which can be translated from Turkish as «city» and in some Turkic languages as «sugar».

Chewing gum production by company was began in 1960. The famous brand of chewing gum Turbo that was launched in 1986 became the most popular in Eastern Europe at first and then in the USSR after its collapse, second only in popularity to Love Is... gum from the same company (now produced by Dandy Saki).

Later company actively expanded its product range. Miss Şeker and Missbonbon candies were introduced in 1971 and Toffy toffees appeared three years later. In 1980 company began to production of Madeleine chocolate and Olips lollipops. In 1986 it launched Topitop lollipops and in 1987 jelly product Jelibon.

In the 1990s the company became a leading confectionery manufacturer and exporter in Turkey. By then it had achieved TSE (Türk Standardları Enstitüsü) certification, strengthening its position in the confectionery and chewing gum industries.

In the summer of 2000 the Kent Bayram television advertising campaign was launched for emphasizing the importance of Turkish traditions and cultural values. This campaign continues to this day.

In 2002 Kent was acquired by the British confectionery company Cadbury and in 2007 it was renamed Kent Gıda.

In 2010 Cadbury became part of the Kraft Foods and Kent Gıda was also absorbed into the company's structure.

In 2012 Kraft Foods split, so Kent Gıda became to brand of Mondelēz International.

== Production range ==
The company produces confectionery products (including baked goods, cookies, candies, lollipops, and jellies), chewing gum, flavored powdered drinks, sweeteners and flavorings. Its products are exported to more than 65 countries.

== Brands ==
Kent Gıda produces confectionery products under several brands, the most famous of which are listed below:

- Turbo
- Tofita
- Topitop
- TipiTip
- Love Is... (now belongs to Dandy Saki)
- Nazar
- First
- Jelibon
