= Ars Fennica Award =

Ars Fennica
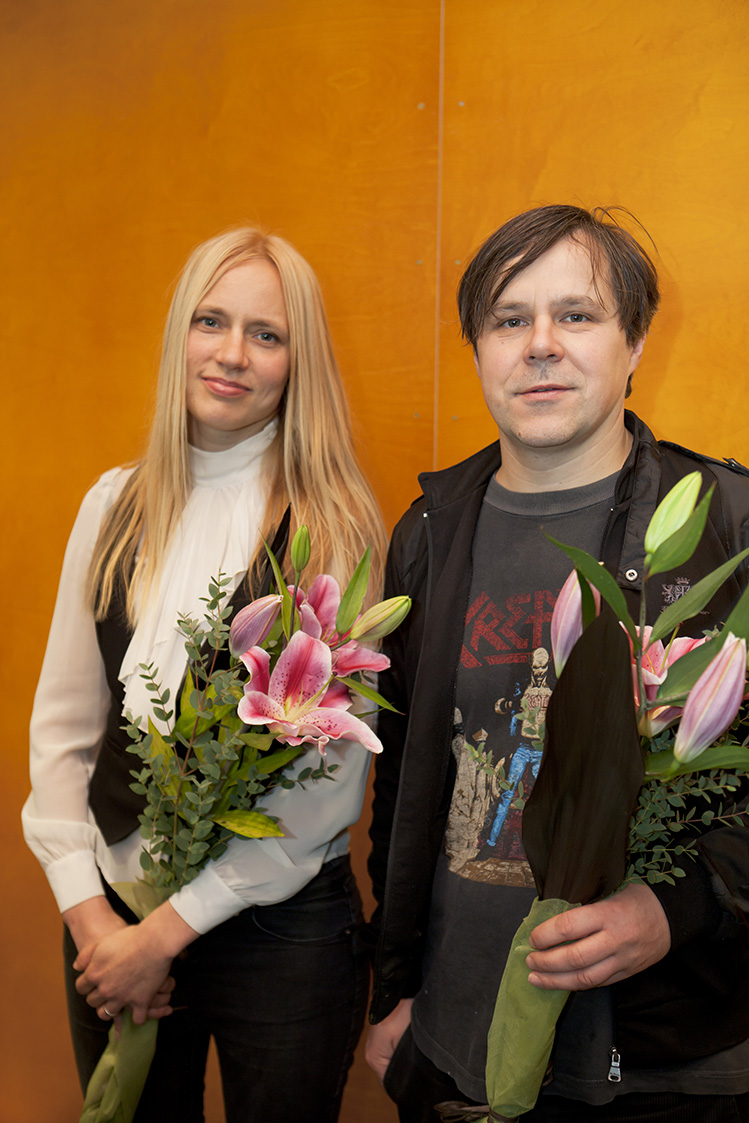
- Tellervo Kalleinen and Oliver Kochta-Kalleinen, awarded in 2014
- Type: Visual arts award
- Awarded for: distinctive artistic output of high merit (artist from Nordic or Baltic countries)
- Sponsored by: Henna and Pertti Niemistö Ars Fennica Art Foundation
- Country: Finland
- Reward: 50,000 Euro
- Established: 1991
- Website: http://www.arsfennica.fi/

Ars Fennica Award presented by the Henna and Pertti Niemistö Ars Fennica Art Foundation is the biggest Finnish art prize awarded annually since 1991 and every two years since 2015. The Ars Fennica art award is made to one artist from Nordic or Baltic countries in recognition of distinctive artistic output of high merit. Since 2021, the prize money has been 50,000 Euro, after it has gradually increased in previous years.

Before the decision is made, there will be a public exhibition of all nominees in the year in question. This took place in 2007, 2009, 2010, 2014 and 2017 and 2023 at the Kiasma Museum in Helsinki. In 2025, the exhibition will take place at the HAM - Helsinki Art Museum.

== Winners ==
Year	Winner
1991	(Finland) Maaria Wirkkala
1992	(Finland) Johan Scott
1993	(Denmark) Per Kirkeby
1994	(Latvia) Olegs Tillbergs
1995	not awarded
1996	(Finland) Silja Rantanen
1997	(Finland) Pauno Pohjolainen
1998	(Sweden) Peter Frie
1999	(Finland) Markus Copper
2000	(Iceland) Hreinn Fridfinnsson
2001	(Finland) Heli Hiltunen
2002	(Finland) Heli Rekula
2003	(Finland) Anu Tuominen
2004	(Finland) Kimmo Schroderus
2005	(Finland) Roi Vaara
2006	(Finland) Ilkka Juhani Takalo-Eskola
2007	(Finland) Markus Kåhre
2008	(Estonia) Mark Raidpere
2009	(Finland) Jussi Kivi
2010	(Scotland) Charles Sandison
2011	(Finland) Anssi Kasitonni
2012	not awarded
2013	(Denmark) Jeppe Hein
2014	(Finland) Tellervo Kalleinen & Oliver Kochta
2015	(Finland) Mika Taanila
2017	(Finland) Kari Vehosalo
2019	(Iceland) Ragnar Kjartansson
2021	(Finland) Eija-Liisa Ahtila
2023	(Lithuania) Emilija Škarnulytė
2025	(Sweden) Roland Persson

== See also ==
- List of European art awards
