= İzocam =

İZOCAM TİCARET VE SANAYİ A.Ş.
- Traded as: BİST: IZOCM
- Industry: Manufacturing
- Founded: 1965
- Headquarters: Turkey
- Key people: Samir Kasem (Chairman)
- Products: Insulation materials.
- Revenue: ₺503 milion (2019)
- Total equity: ₺170 million (2019)
- Website: www.izocam.com.tr

İzocam is a Turkish insulation material manufacturer.

== History ==
Izocam was founded in 1965 as the first producer of Fibreglass insulation material in Turkey, and began production in Gebze, just east of Istanbul, in 1967. Since the 1990s Izocam has produced glass wool in Tarsus, Mersin and mineral wool in the Gebze plant. Both materials are produced under license from French manufacturer Isover Saint-Gobain, and expanded polystyrene boards under license from the Owens Corning Corporation. Finally, in 2000 Izocam began producing flexible rubber insulation materials in Eskişehir, under the license from Armacell GmbH.
