= Derimod =

Turkish leather fashion brand

Derimod Konfeksiyon Ayakkabı Deri Sanayi Ticaret A.Ş.
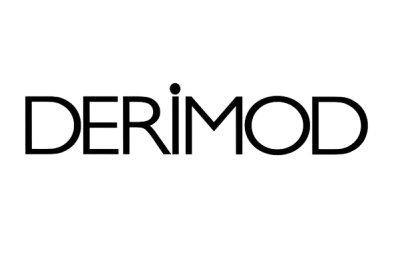
- Traded as: BİST: DERIM
- Industry: Leather goods.
- Founded: 1974; 52 years ago
- Headquarters: Istanbul, Turkey
- Area served: Turkey and abroad
- Key people: Ümit Zaim (chairman)
- Revenue: ▲$92 million (2023)
- Website: www.derimod.com.tr

Derimod is a Turkish leather goods producer and retailer, with stores in both the US and Turkey.

== History ==
The company was founded in 1974. Today, Derimod manufactures leather clothing and accessories. The company also operates 81 retail stores selling both Derimod's own brands as well as goods from other manufacturers. Their stores can be found in some of Turkey's biggest shopping centres, such as Istinye Park.
