= ICBC Turkey =

Foreign capital private sector Turkish bank

- Formerly: Tekstilbank (Tekstil Bankası A.Ş.)
- Type: Public
- Traded as: BİST: ICBCT; BİST: TKSTL (old)
- Industry: Finance and Insurance
- Founded: 1986; 40 years ago
- Headquarters: Maslak, Istanbul, Turkey,
- Number of locations: 44 branches (2010) in Turkey
- Area served: Turkey
- Key people: Xu Keen (Chairman); Gao Xiangyang (CEO)
- Products: Banking; Investment banking Investment management
- Parent: ICBC
- Website: www.icbc.com.tr / www.tekstilbank.com.tr

ICBC Turkey Bank A.Ş., formerly known as Tekstilbank A.Ş. was founded in 1986. In 2014, GSD Holding A.Ş sold their 75.5% stock to Industrial and Commercial Bank of China (ICBC). The acquisition completed in April 2015. In November 2015, the name of the bank changed to "ICBC Turkey". In July 2018, ICBC provided a $3.6-billion loan package for the Turkish energy and transportation sector.

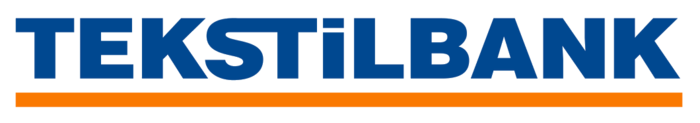
Logo of Tekstilbank A.Ş. until 2015

The remaining 24.5% stock is public and is operated in Borsa Istanbul. ICBC Yatırım, a subsidiary of ICBC, provides support to stock market investors.
