= Şekerbank =

Turkish private sector bank

Şekerbank T.A.Ş.

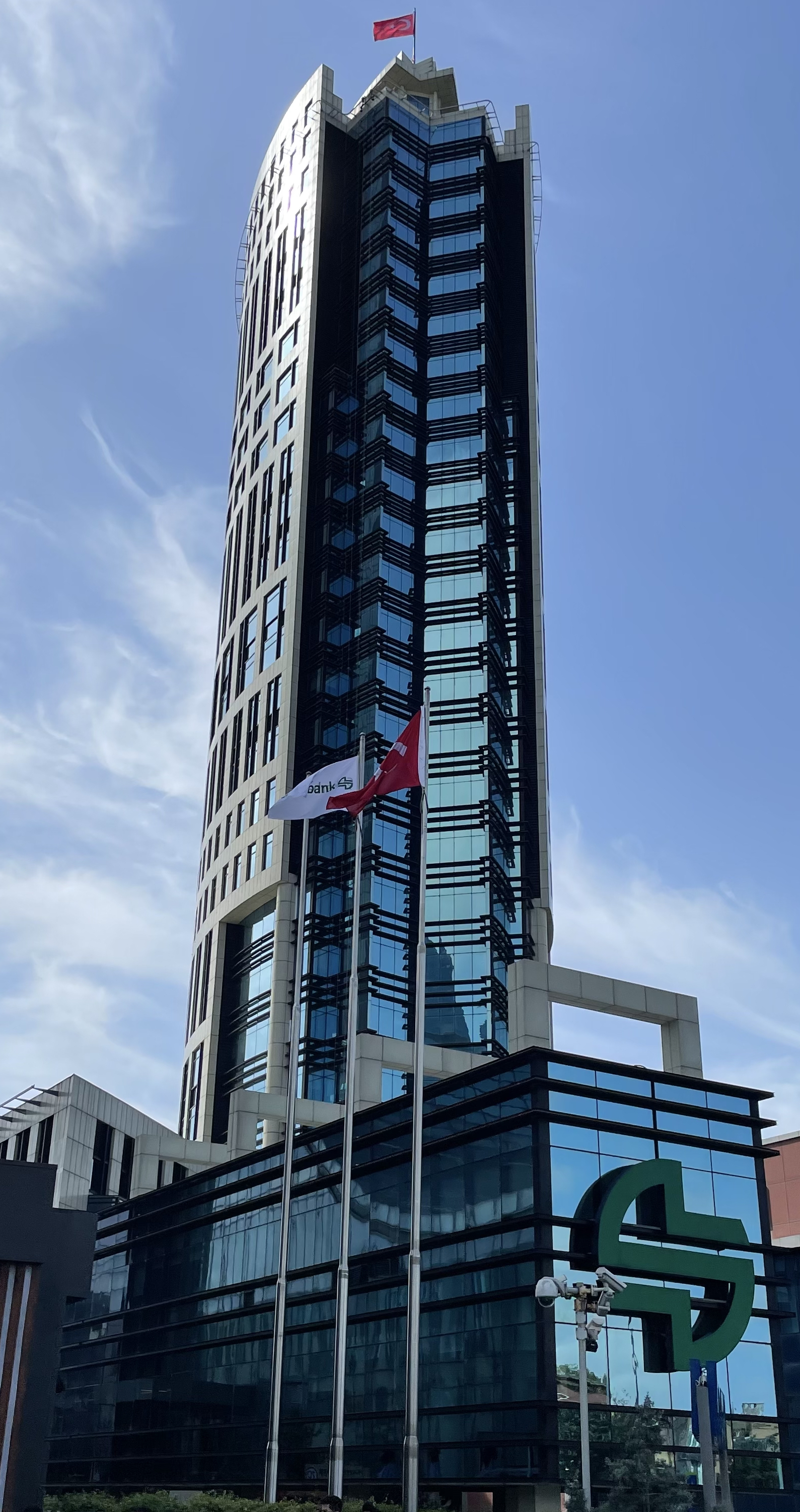
- Şekerbank’s Headquarters in Istanbul, Turkey.
- Formerly: Sugar Beet Cooperative Bank (1953-1956)
- Type: Anonim Şirket
- Traded as: BİST: SKBNK
- Founded: 12 October 1953; 72 years ago in Eskişehir, Turkey (as Sugar Beet Cooperative Bank)
- Headquarters: Istanbul, Turkey
- Number of locations: 272
- Revenue: ▲US$719.4 million (2024)
- Operating income: ▼US$101.7 million (2024)
- Net income: ▼US$92.1 million (2024)
- Total assets: ▲US$3.76 billion (2024)
- Total equity: ▲US$526 million (2024)
- Number of employees: 3,542
- Website: www.sekerbank.com.tr/en

Şekerbank T.A.Ş. was founded in 1953 as the Sugar Beet Cooperative Bank in Eskişehir, Turkey. In 1956, the bank relocated to Ankara and was renamed to Şekerbank. The initial public offering of the bank was carried out in 1997, and in 2004 the bank relocated its headquarters again, this time to Istanbul, Turkey. Şekerbank is a bank that provides consumer loans, vehicle loans, housing loans and commercial loans. Dr. Hasan Basri Göktan is the chairman of the board of Şekerbank.

== Subsidiaries ==
Şeker Investment, Şeker Factoring, Şeker Leasing, Şeker Finance and Şekerbank Cyprus Ltd. are among Şekerbank financial subsidiaries.

== Activities ==
Şekerbank has 238 branches throughout Turkey, including 1 mobile branch, 7 regional offices (1 in Istanbul, 6 in Anatolia), and many of its branches spread across 67 provinces and 87 non-central districts have been serving in the same place and region for nearly half a century.
