= NG Group =

Turkish porcelain manufacturer

NG Group (Turkish: NG Grup) is a Turkish group of companies manufacturing porcelain located in Kütahya, Turkey. Employers of two companies of the group are women only.

The NG Porselen, which elaborately decorates porcelain plates produced by Kütahya Porselen company, employs all women 102 personnel. In the NG Loji stik company, 135 personnel, all women, work. The president of Kütahya Poselen is Sema Güral Sürmeli, the daughter of the founder of the company Nafi Güral. NG Lojistik company is packaging around 100 million products yearly and exports to 72 countries worldwide.

It was reported that the rate of women in all companies of the group are 25% of the workers in the production, 35% of the white-collar workers, 50% of the managers and three of the five executive board members.
