= Soley =

Soley may refer to:

== Surname ==
- Clive Soley, Baron Soley (born 1939), Labour Party politician in the United Kingdom
- James R. Soley (1850–1911), lawyer, Naval historian, Assistant Secretary of the Navy in the U.S. Navy
- Jane Soley Hamilton (1805–1897), pioneer midwife in Brookfield, Nova Scotia
- Jordi Pujol i Soley (born 1930), Catalan politician
- K. Soley (born 1983), Malaysian footballer who plays as a right midfielder
- Richard Soley, chair and CEO of Object Management Group, Inc.
- Seyfo Soley (born 1980), Gambian football (soccer) midfielder
- Steve Soley (born 1971), English footballer
- Tomás Enrique Soley Soler (1939–2001), Costa Rican politician

== Given name or mononym or nickname ==
- Dilara Soley Deli (born 2002), Germany-born Azerbaijani and Turkish women's footballer
- Sóley (musician), a singer and pianist who also performs in the Icelandic band Seabear
- Guðrún Sóley Gunnarsdóttir (born 1982), Icelandic football player who plays as a defender
- Sóley (given name), the name.

== Title ==
- Clive Soley, Baron Soley (born 1939), Labour Party politician in the United Kingdom

== See also ==
- USS Soley (DD-707), an Allen M. Sumner–class destroyer, named for James R. Soley
