= Riyadh Park =

Shopping mall in Riyadh, Saudi Arabia

- الرياض بارك
- Location: Riyadh, Saudi Arabia
- Coordinates: 24°45′24.4″N 46°37′48.1″E
- Opened: 2017
- Manager: Hamat Property Services
- Floor area: 132,000 m^{2}
- Parking: 2,000
- Website: Official website

The Riyadh Park (Arabic: الرياض بارك) is a shopping mall in the al-Aqeeq district of Riyadh, Saudi Arabia. Opened in 2017, it hosts the Museum of Illusions.

== History ==
The movie theater of the shopping mall was opened on 30 April 2018.

== Architecture ==
The shopping mall covers a total floor area of 132,000 m^{2} with gross leasable area of 92,000 m^{2}. Its parking lot can accommodate 2,000 cars.awa xD

== Tenants ==
The shopping mall features the Museum of Illusions.

== See also ==
- List of shopping malls in Saudi Arabia
