= Turbo (chewing gum) =

Brand of chewing gum

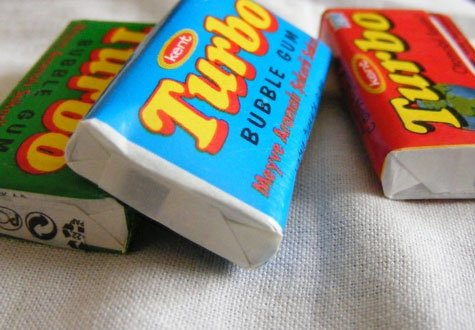
A stack of Turbo chewing gums.

Turbo is a brand of chewing gum, produced by the Turkish company Kent from the late 1980s to 2007. Turbo's inserts, which featured the images of various vehicles, were a collectable fad from the late 1980s to 1990s.

A new Turbo gum came in 2015; and in 2018 the Turbo gum received an update. It was available in Poland and Romania in 2015.
