= Heli Rekula =

Finnish photographer and video maker

- Born: 28 February 1963 (age 63); Helsinki

Heli Rekula (born 28 February 1963) is a Finnish photographer and video maker. She is a member of "The Helsinki School" of photography.

== Life ==
Rekula was born in Helsinki in 1963. Rekula graduated from the Lahti Institute of Design photography course in 1991.

In the 1990s and early 2000s, she worked as a freelance photographer contributing to the newspaper Helsingin Sanomat. She has taught Art and Design at the Academy of Fine Arts. In 2008 she was chosen to be the Finn who would spend a year in Ireland as part of an exchange. She was based at the Temple Bar Gallery and Studios in Dublin. Between 2009 and 2015, she worked as Professor of Photography at the Bergen Academy of Art and Design before becoming Senior University Lecturer at the Master's Programme in Photography at Aalto University.

In 2001, Rekula participated in the Venice Biennale. Rekula has been awarded the Ars Fennica Award in 2002 photography State Prize in 2005 and the Finnish Art Society Prize for Literature in 2014 of her work Hemingway's Garden. Rekula has made a study of the influences on the writer Ernest Hemingway.

Rekula won the Carnegie Art Award in 2012. Her works from the years 1989–2004 were featured in Kiasma - the Museum of Contemporary Art in 2005 in a large retrospective exhibition DESERT.
