= Bera Holding =

BERA HOLDİNG A.Ş.
- Traded as: BİST: BERA
- Industry: Investments, esp printing, distribution
- Founded: 1988
- Headquarters: Konya, Turkey
- Key people: Ali Rıza Alaboyun (Chairman)
- Revenue: ▲ ₺12.853 billion (2023)
- Operating income: ▼ ₺1.538 billion (2023)
- Net income: ▲ ₺3.321 billion (2023)
- Total assets: ▲ ₺23.995 billion (2023)
- Total equity: ▲ ₺17.294 billion (2023)
- Website: www.beraholding.com.tr/en

Bera Holding is a Turkish group of companies with subsidiaries in a range of sectors, based in the city of Konya.

== History ==
The first company of the Bera Holding, a printing house, was founded in Konya in late 1988. Since the group has gone on to invest in businesses in a wide range of sectors, with the Kombassan integrated paper plant and printing facility still the group's largest operation. Other businesses include the Kongaz LPG bottling facility, flour mills, water bottling plants, construction materials, marble, a textile factory, and the Bera hotel chain In 2000 Kombassan acquired the Rulmenti bearings plant in Bârlad, Romania.
