= Asbestos Testing and Consultancy Association =

- Abbreviation: ATAC
- Formation: 1990; 36 years ago
- Type: Trade association
- Legal status: Association
- Purpose: The voice of asbestos testing and consultancy in the United Kingdom
- Location: Stretton, East Staffordshire, United Kingdom
- Region served: United Kingdom
- Website: www.atac.org.uk

The Asbestos Testing And Consultancy Association (ATAC) is a British trade association for companies in the United Kingdom who carry out asbestos surveying, analytical and laboratory work.

== History ==
The organisation was founded in Burton-on-Trent in 1990. It was founded by various consultancy companies through its sister association, the Asbestos Removal Contractors Association (ARCA), as the consultancies required a trade association voice of their own.

== Structure ==
The head office is in Burton and there is a training centre in Rayleigh, Essex, the association also has access to various other training centres across the UK.

== Leadership ==
The association was up until 2013 run on a day-to-day basis by Ian Stone CCP who has been in the asbestos industry for over fifteen years. Ian has worked on both the asbestos consultancy and asbestos removal sides of the industry. The current Chairman of ATAC is Andrew Jackson who has been in the industry for nearly two decades, he also is the managing director of an asbestos and statutory compliance consultancy (Acorn Analytical Services Ltd). Andrew replaced Jonathan Francis as ATAC Chairman in 2011 and will hold the tenure for two years.

Ian Stone has since left ATAC after 3 years at the association. During Ian's time at the association he helped create various industry recognised qualifications which helped place ATAC at the forefront of the asbestos industry. He is now a Director of Acorn Analytical Services. He works from the Northampton and London offices providing consultancy to various large scale and blue chip clients.

== Functions ==
ATAC is at the forefront of the asbestos industry raising awareness about asbestos issues. They participated in a campaign in 2010 about Asbestos In Schools, which led the association to be part of a parliamentary steering group.

The association also works alongside the Health and Safety Executive (HSE) and other regulatory bodies such as the United Kingdom Accreditation Service (UKAS) to help raise awareness of asbestos and to improve the standards within the asbestos industry.

The association has 70 member companies which are located across the UK, there are also information members of the association who subscribe from Europe and internationally.
