= Componenta =

Finnish manufacturing company

Componenta Corporation
- Type: Julkinen osakeyhtiö (Public company)
- Traded as: Nasdaq Helsinki: CTH1V
- Headquarters: Vantaa, Finland
- Area served: Worldwide
- Key people: Sami Sivuranta (CEO)
- Revenue: 70.0 million euros (2020)
- Operating income: €3.7 million (2020)
- Net income: €−2.0 million (2020)
- Total assets: €64.0 million (2020)
- Total equity: €23.9 million (2020)
- Number of employees: 590 (Dec 31, 2020)
- Website: www.componenta.com

Componenta is a contract manufacturer of cast and machined metal components, located in Finland. Its customers are typically global manufacturers of vehicles, machines and equipment. Componenta is listed on Nasdaq Helsinki.

Componenta's production units locate in Finland. There are two foundries (in Pori and in Karkkila), four machining services units (in Jyväskylä, in Härmä, in Kurikka and in Sastamala), and material services units (plate cutting, hydraulic tube manufacturing, forge) in Jyväskylä and in Leppävesi. In 2020, the company employed about 590 people.

== History ==
Componenta's history goes back to 1820 when the Högfors ironworks was founded in Karkkila. Iron production was stopped in Högfors in 1916, but the foundry has remained in Karkkila and is currently operating, at Componenta Castings Oy. Karkkila foundry is the oldest operating foundry in Finland. The second milestone in the 19th century was the founding of the Pori foundry in 1858.

=== Rauta- ja Metallivalimo Suomi (1918–1974) ===
Matti Lehtonen started his foundry business in Helsinki in 1918 by buying one of the biggest foundries in Helsinki, Helsingin Valimo. The most significant customer for Lehtonen's Rauta- ja Metallivalimo Suomi during the first decade was Maanviljelyskonetehdas Oy to which Lehtonen supplied cast-iron components for agricultural machinery. Rauta- ja Metallivalimo Suomi survived the downturn of the global economy during the 1930s by having good long-term customers, like Lokomo Oy from Tampere. During the period of growth and prosperity after the 1930s depression, Rauta- ja Metallivalimo Suomi was supplying e.g. parts for harvesters, rubber production machinery, and also manufactured its by then the largest casts, six 8 ton vats for pulp production.

By 1937, the company had over 100 employees. Its products received a silver medal for excellent quality at the Paris International Exposition. When Matti Lehtonen died at the age of 70 in 1939, his son Bernhard Matias Lehtonen took over the company.

During the war years, the foundry manufactured military goods such as hand grenades and landmines. After the war, Finland had to pay war reparations to Russia, and for that purpose, the foundry focused on making tempered cast iron wheels (“Griffin wheels”). After the Finnish Winter War and Continuation War, the foundry employed more than 200 people. In the 1950s and 1960s Rauta- ja Metallivalimo Suomi grew further and was successful both as a contract manufacturer and as a manufacturer of their own products.

=== Suomivalimo Oy (1975–1999) ===
In 1973, Yrjö M. Lehtonen started as the CEO of Rauta- ja Metallivalimo Suomi. The company moved to Iisalmi in 1975 and changed its name to Suomivalimo Oy. The Helsinki foundry was closed down in 1977. Between 1984 and 1988, the company acquired e.g. the Högfors foundry in Karkkila, Rosenlew foundry in Pori and Santasalo-Vaihteet. Santasalo-Vaihteet, led by Heikki Lehtonen, continued as an independent company and was listed on the Stock Exchange in 1988.

In 1990, the company acquired Främmestad, a machine shop located in Sweden. The recession years of the early 1990s were not easy for the Lehtonens' family business. During that decade, Suomivalimo Oy operated under the names of JOT-Yhtiöt, JOT Components, Santasalo-Vaihteet and Santasalo-JOT. After the Santasalo-Vaihteet was sold to Metso in 1999, the company began to concentrate on foundry business.

=== Componenta (1999–) ===
In 1999, the Santasalo-JOT Group changed its name to Componenta. Componenta was listed on Nasdaq Helsinki in 2000 as a company focusing on foundry operations. Foreign operations for Componenta were further expanded in the mid-2000s when Componenta acquired the majority shareholdings in De Globe, a foundry company in the Netherlands, and in Döktas Dökümcülük Ticaret ve Sanayi, a Turkish cast iron and aluminium component manufacturer that employed 2,500 people. With these acquisitions Componenta became the second largest independent manufacturer of cast iron components in Europe. In 2006 it had 5,250 employees of whom 22 per cent were working in Finland.

In Autumn 2016, Componenta announced that its Dutch operations will file for bankruptcy and that its Finnish and Swedish operations will file for restructuring.

Componenta sold its Turkish operations in 2017. The Componenta Group had foundries in Pori and Karkkila in Finland, and the Främmestad machine shop in Sweden, and there were about 660 employees.

In August 2019, Componenta acquired Komas Oy and became the leading metal component manufacturer in Finland. The history of Komas Oy goes back to 1926 when Valtion Kivääritehdas was founded in Jyväskylä, Finland. In 2018, Komas had 175 employees in Jyväskylä and Laukaa. Componenta's Swedish subsidiary, Componenta Främmestad AB, filed for bankruptcy in September 2019.

== Products ==
Componenta manufactures cast and machined components for its customers who are global manufacturers of vehicles, machines and equipment.

== Organization ==
=== Management ===
The President and CEO of Componenta Corporation is Sami Sivuranta (since March 2020). In 2021 the Board of Directors consists of Harri Suutari (chair), Anne Leskelä, Tomas Hedenborg and Petteri Walldén.

=== Share and shareholders ===
The top five shareholders of Componenta (March 31, 2021)

1. Capman Buyout VIII Fund A L.P. (12.11%)
2. Etra Capital Oy (9.9%)
3. Varma Mutual Pension Insurance Company (4.39%)
4. Elo Mutual Pension Insurance Company(3.75 %)
5. Citibank Europe PLC (1.42%)

== Recognitions ==
- Silver medal for quality of product in the Exposition Internationale des Arts et Techniques dans la Vie Moderne in 1937
