= Ataç =

Ataç is a Turkish surname and a masculine given name. Its meaning is given as "a child who shows greatness" in Dīwān Lughāt al-Turk. According to the Dictionary of Personal Names in Turkish it refers to "ancestral or pertaining to ancestors."

Notable people with the name are as follows:

== Surname ==
- Hasan Fehmi Ataç (1879–1961), Turkish politician
- Metin Ataç (born 1946), Turkish navy officer
- Muzaffer Ataç, known as Muzaffer Atac (1933–2010), Turkish-American physicist
- Nurullah Ataç (1898–1957), Turkish writer
- Sezgin Ataç (born 1998), Turkish long-distance runner
- Yavuz Ataç, Turkish intelligence official

== Given name ==
- Ataç İmamoğlu (born 1964), Turkish-Swiss physicist
