= Turkish lira sign =

Currency sign

₺

Turkish lira sign
- In Unicode: U+20BA ₺ TURKISH LIRA SIGN

Currency
- Currency: Turkish lira

The Turkish lira sign (symbol: ₺; image: ₺) is the currency symbol used for the Turkish lira, the official currency of Turkey and Northern Cyprus. It serves as a visual identifier for the lira in written and printed documents, as well as in digital communications. The design was presented to the public on March 1, 2012. The international three-letter code (according to ISO 4217) is TRY.

== Adoption and introduction ==
The Turkish lira sign was officially introduced by the Central Bank of the Republic of Turkey (CBRT) on March 1, 2012. The symbol was selected through a public competition organized by the CBRT to find a distinctive and culturally relevant symbol for the Turkish lira.

The competition attracted submissions from designers and members of the public, who were invited to propose symbols that captured the essence of Turkish identity and culture. The winning design was chosen by a panel of judges and subsequently approved for adoption as the official symbol of the Turkish lira.

The symbol is protected by the Turkish Patent and Trademark Office. The symbol can be used freely within the framework of ethical rules and provided that it does not harm the rights arising from trademark-patent and intellectual and artistic works law.

== Design and symbolism ==
Design

In order to improve the recognizability of the Turkish currency and to show its strength in a broad manner, it was decided to create a new symbol. For this purpose, a design contest was organized on September 8, 2011, by the Central Bank of Turkey.

The design created by Tülay Lale was endorsed after a country-wide competition. It was chosen as the winner from a shortlist of seven submissions to the board of the Central Bank, selected from a total of 8,362 entries. The symbol resembles the first letter of the Turkish monetary unit L in the form of a half anchor with double stroke. With reference to "safe haven" notion in finance, the anchor depicts strength and confidence, and the upward-inclined double bar the steadily rising value of the currency and the Turkish economy.

The Turkish lira sign was unveiled on March 1, 2012, in a presentation held in the Central Bank's main building by Prime Minister Recep Tayyip Erdoğan, Deputy Prime Minister responsible for the Economy Ali Babacan and the governor of the Central Bank Erdem Başçı.

== Coding ==
In May 2012, Unicode decided the encoding of U+20BA ₺ TURKISH LIRA SIGN and it was included in Unicode 6.2 released in September 2012. It was the only character addition in version 6.2. On Microsoft Windows operating systems, when using Turkish-Q or Turkish-F keyboard layouts, it can be typed with the combination AltGr+T.

== Usage and implementation ==
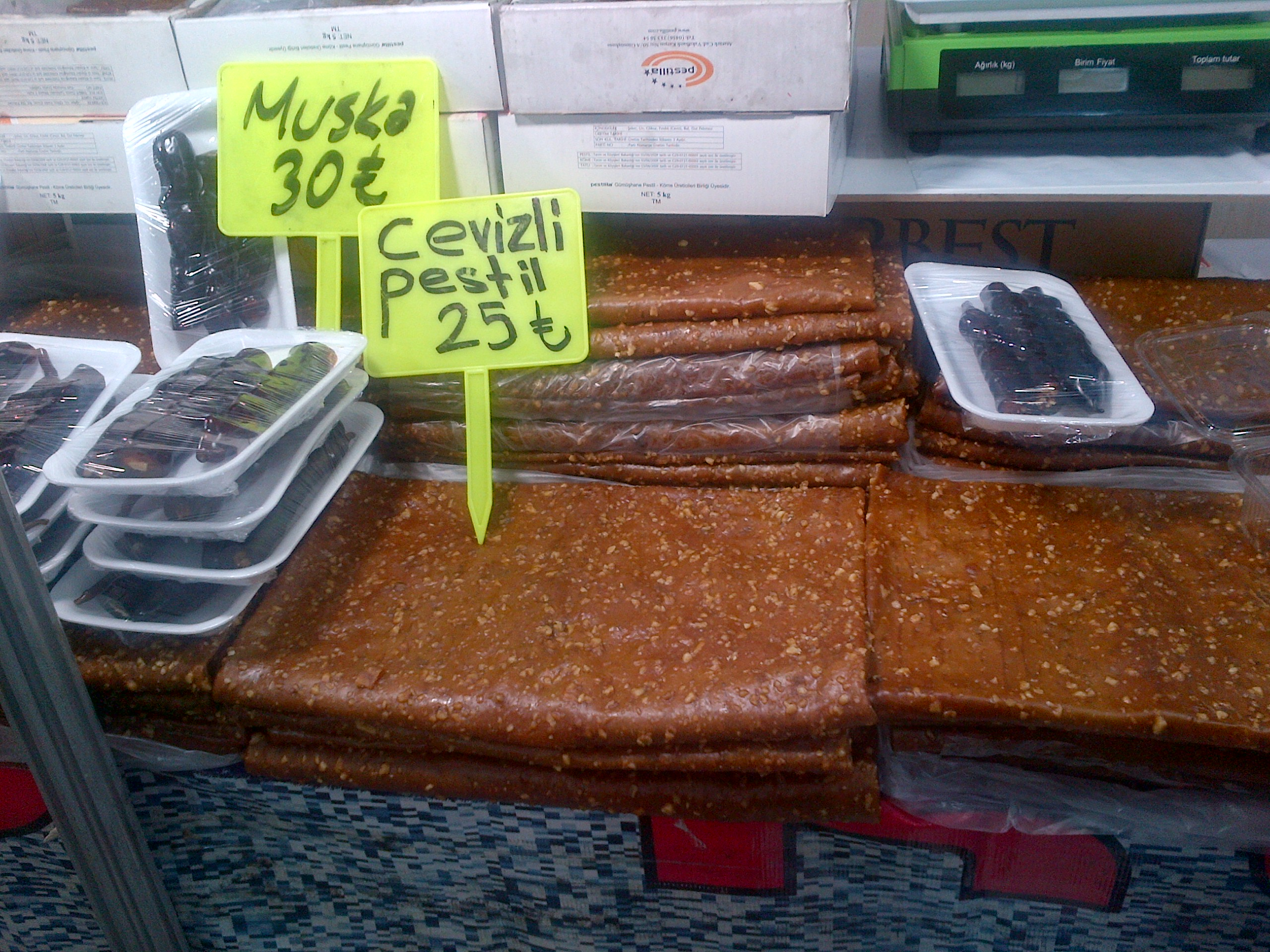
Turkish pestil with walnuts

Since its introduction, the Turkish lira sign has been widely adopted and incorporated into various aspects of daily life in Turkey. It is commonly used in written and printed materials, such as newspapers, magazines, advertisements, and financial documents, to denote prices, monetary values, and currency denominations.

The symbol is also utilized in digital communications, including websites, social media platforms, and electronic banking systems, to represent the Turkish lira in online transactions and financial transactions conducted via digital channels. Furthermore, the adoption of the Turkish lira sign underscores Turkey's commitment to modernization and globalization, as it aligns the country's currency symbol with international standards and practices. The symbol's introduction represents a milestone in Turkey's efforts to enhance the visibility and recognition of its currency on the global stage.

== See also ==
- Currency of Turkey
- Currency symbol

== Sources ==
- Bagli, Humanur; Gelmez, Koray (March 2013). Anatomy of a new "letter": A story of a design competition for the currency sign of Turkish Lira (PDF). Typography Day 2013. Guwahati, India: Indian Institute of Technology.
