= Borsa Istanbul =

Turkish stock exchange

Borsa İstanbul
- Type: Stock exchange
- Location: İstinye, Istanbul, Turkey
- Coordinates: 41°06′38″N 29°02′23″E
- Founded: 1866 (formally renamed Dersaadet Securities Exchange in 1873); December 26, 1985 (as İMKB); April 5, 2013 (as Borsa Istanbul)
- Owner: Turkey Wealth Fund
- Key people: Erişah Arıcan (Chairperson); Mehmet Hakan Atilla (CEO)
- Currency: Turkish lira
- No. of listings: 655
- Market cap: $346.20 billion (2023)
- Indices: BIST 30; BIST 50; BIST 100
- Website: www.borsaistanbul.com/en

The Borsa İstanbul (BİST) is the sole exchange entity of Turkey combining the former Istanbul Stock Exchange (ISE; Turkish: İstanbul Menkul Kıymetler Borsası, IMKB), the Istanbul Gold Exchange (İstanbul Altın Borsası, İAB) and the Derivatives Exchange of Turkey (Vadeli İşlem Opsiyon Borsası, VOB) under one umbrella. It was established as an incorporated company with a founding capital of ₺423,234,000 (approx. US$240 million) on April 3, 2013, and began to operate on April 5, 2013. Its slogan is worth investing.

Shareholders of Borsa İstanbul in 2013 were: 49% Government of Turkey, 41% IMKB, 5% VOB, 4% IMKB members, 1% IMKB brokers and 0.3% IAB members. It is planned that all the Government-owned shares will be offered for sale. Among the executives of the nine-member board of directors, which is presided by chairman Himmet Karadağ, are former deputy chairman of ISE Osman Akyüz, former head of VOB Işınsu Kestelli, Merrill Lynch Investment Bank General Manager Hüseyin Kelezoğlu and Chairman of Turkish Association of Capital Market Intermediary Institutions Attila Köksal.

Shareholders of the Borsa İstanbul are (as of 2024) :

- Turkey Wealth Fund - 80.6%
- QH Oil Investments LLC - 10%
- Turkish Capital Markets Association (TCMA) - 1.3%
- Borsa İstanbul A.Ş. - 2.32%
- Others - 5.78%

== History ==
=== Early days of the securities market in Turkey ===
The origin of an organized securities market in Turkey has its roots in the second half of the 19th century. The first securities market in the Ottoman Empire was established in Istanbul in 1866 for refinancing the Ottoman foreign debt taken during the Crimean War (1853–1856) through government bonds. With a law in 1873 it was formally renamed as the Dersaadet Securities Exchange (Turkish: Dersaadet Tahvilat Borsası). It created a medium for European investors who were seeking higher returns in the vast Ottoman markets. Following the proclamation of the Turkish Republic, a new law was enacted in 1929 to reorganize the fledgling capital markets under the new name of "Istanbul Securities and Foreign Exchange Bourse".

Soon, the Bourse became very active and contributed substantially to the funding requirements of new enterprises across the country. However, its success was clouded by a string of events, including the Great Depression of 1929 and the impending World War II abroad which had taken their toll in the just developing business world in Turkey. During the industrial drive of the subsequent decades, there was a continuous increase in the number and size of joint stock companies, which began to open up their equity to the public. Those mature shares faced a strong and growing demand from mostly individual investors and some institutional investors.

=== 1980s to the present ===
The early phase of the 1980s saw a marked improvement in the Turkish capital markets, both in regard to the legislative framework and the institutions required to set the stage for sound capital movements. In 1981, the "Capital Market Law" was enacted. The next year, the main regulatory body responsible for the supervision and regulation of the Turkish securities market, the Capital Markets Board based in Ankara, was established. A new decree was issued in October 1983 foreseeing the setting up of securities exchanges in the country. In October 1984, the "Regulations for the Establishment and Functions of Securities Exchanges" was published in the Official Gazette. The regulations concerning operational procedures were approved in the parliament and the Istanbul Stock Exchange was formally inaugurated at the end of 1985.

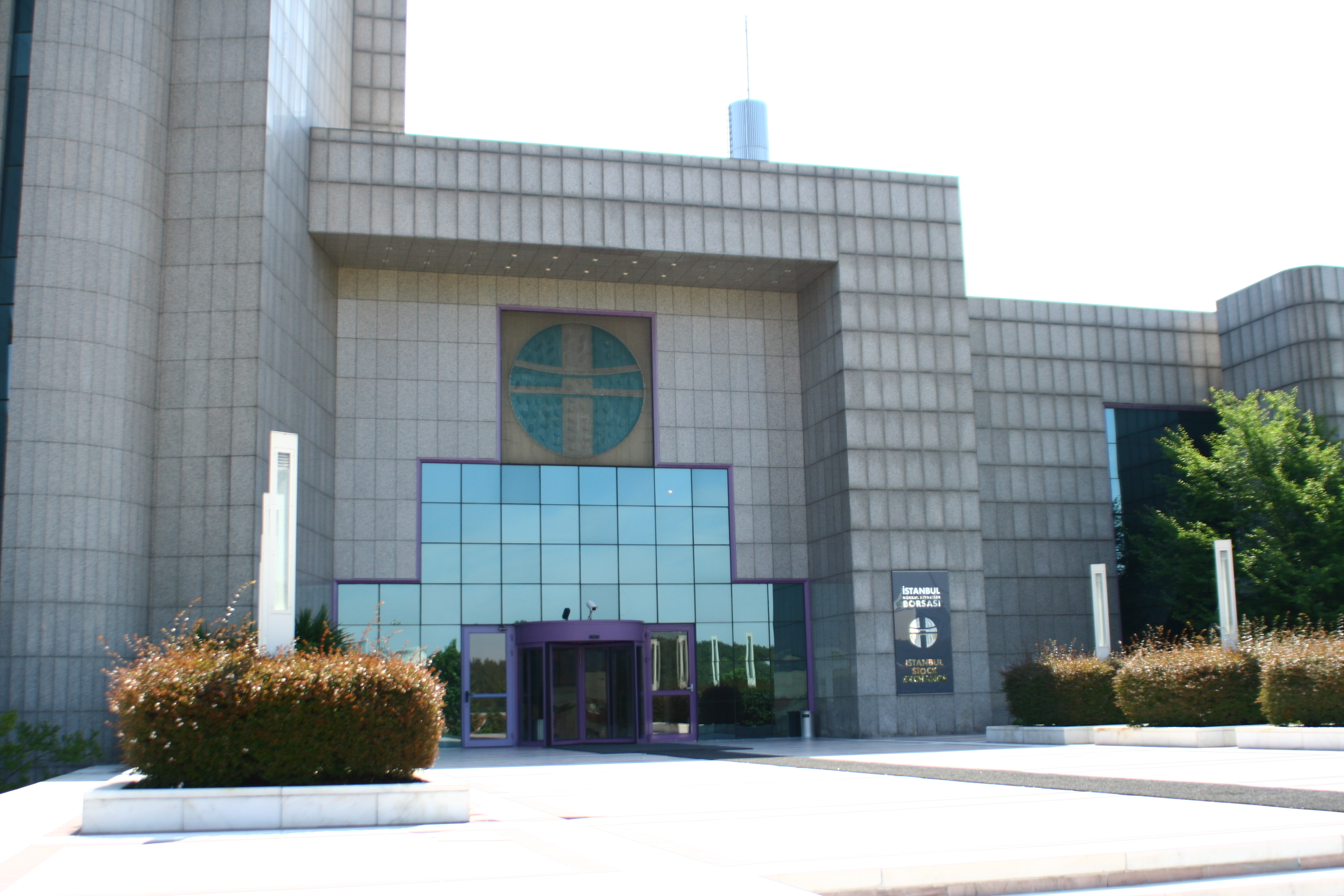
A view of the Borsa Istanbul building in the İstinye quarter of Istanbul in 2007, with the former İMKB logo above the entrance.

The Istanbul Stock Exchange (ISE) was the only corporation in Turkey for securities exchange established to provide trading in equities, bonds and bills, revenue-sharing certificates, private sector bonds, foreign securities and real estate certificates as well as international securities. The ISE was founded as an autonomous, professional organization in early 1986. It is situated in a modern building complex in the quarter of İstinye, on the European side of Istanbul, since May 15, 1995.

ISE is home to 320 national companies. Trading hours are 09:30–12:30 for the first session and 14:00–17:30 for the second session, on workdays. All ISE members are incorporated banks and brokerage houses.

ISE price indices are computed and published throughout the trading session while the return indices are calculated and published at the close of the session only. The indices are: ISE National-All Shares Index, ISE National-30, ISE National-50, ISE National-100, Sector and sub-sector indices, ISE Second National Market Index, ISE New Economy Market Index and ISE Investment Trusts Index. The ISE National-100 Index contains both the ISE National-50 and ISE National-30 Index and is used as a main indicator of the national market.

On April 5, 2013, the Istanbul Stock Exchange merged with the Istanbul Gold Exchange and was reorganized and renamed as Borsa Istanbul.

=== Logo of Borsa Istanbul ===
The current logo of Borsa Istanbul is the traditional flower of Istanbul's imperial gardens, the tulip, also the namesake of the Tulip period in Ottoman history, which was first introduced to the Europeans in Vienna, 1554, as a gift by Ottoman Sultan Suleiman the Magnificent to Charles V, Holy Roman Emperor, of the House of Habsburg. The tulip later even became a valuable investment commodity in Europe, especially in Habsburg Netherlands, during the Tulip mania of the 17th century.

== Memberships of ISE ==
The ISE is a full member of:

- World Federation of Exchanges (WFE)
- Federation of Euro-Asian Stock Exchanges (FEAS)
- International Securities Services Association (ISSA)
- International Capital Market Association (ICMA)
- European Capital Markets Institute (ECMI)
- World Economic Forum (WEF)
- Federation of European Securities Exchanges (FESE)
- Sustainable Stock Exchanges (SSE) initiative and

The ISE is an affiliate member of:

- International Organization of Securities Commissions (IOSCO)

== Fossil fuel investments ==
According to Carbon Tracker in 2021 $1 billion of investment in coal power was at risk of stranding, including $300 million for EÜAŞ.

== ISE and arts ==
There is a four-meter high marble statue of the "Bull and Bear", in front of the ISE building's protocol entrance. Created by one of Turkey's foremost sculptors, Mehmet Aksoy, the statue symbolizes the behavior of the world's stock markets, an aggressive bull poised to attack the surrendering bear. Another group of statues, sculptured by Şermin Güner, made in the honor of all existing and deceased brokers, represents brokers engaged in executing orders and is placed at the main entrance.

The Istanbul Stock Exchange makes contributions to the arts by organizing exhibitions and concerts as well as sponsoring important artistic events in Istanbul.

== See also ==
- BIST 100
- List of companies listed on the Istanbul Stock Exchange
- Economy of Turkey
- List of stock exchanges
- List of European stock exchanges
- List of Mideast stock exchanges
