= Neoclassical architecture =

18th- and 19th-century revivalist style

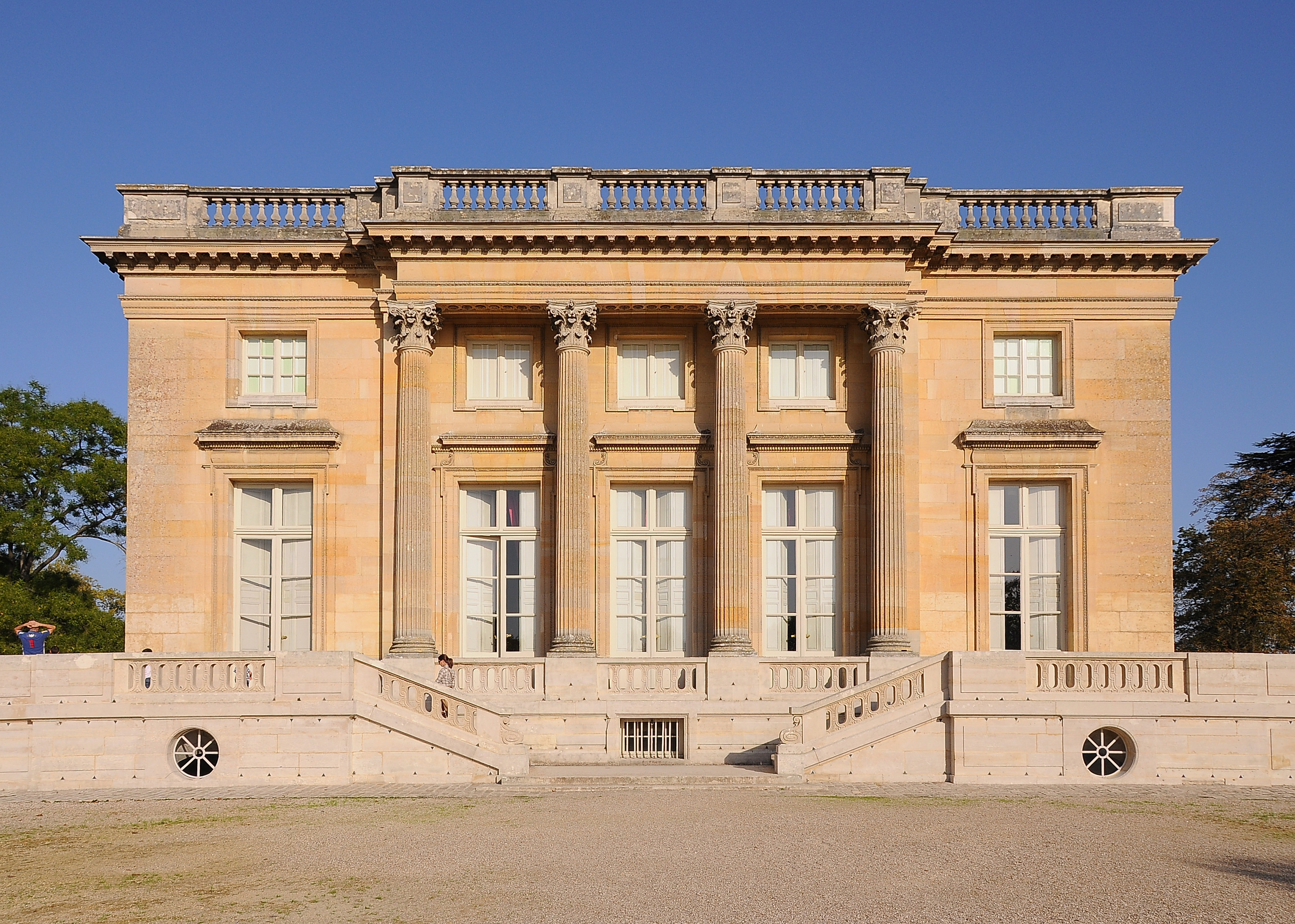
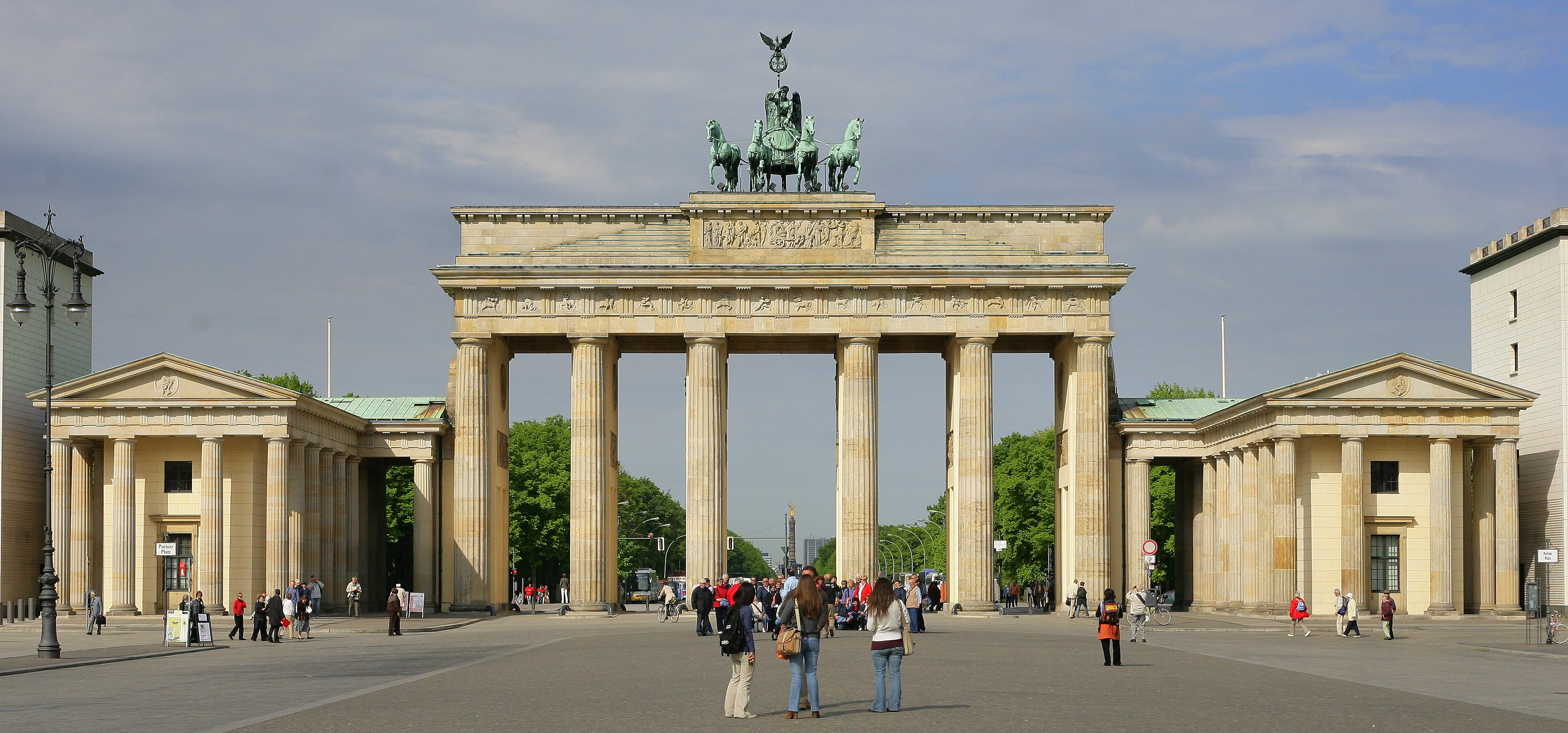
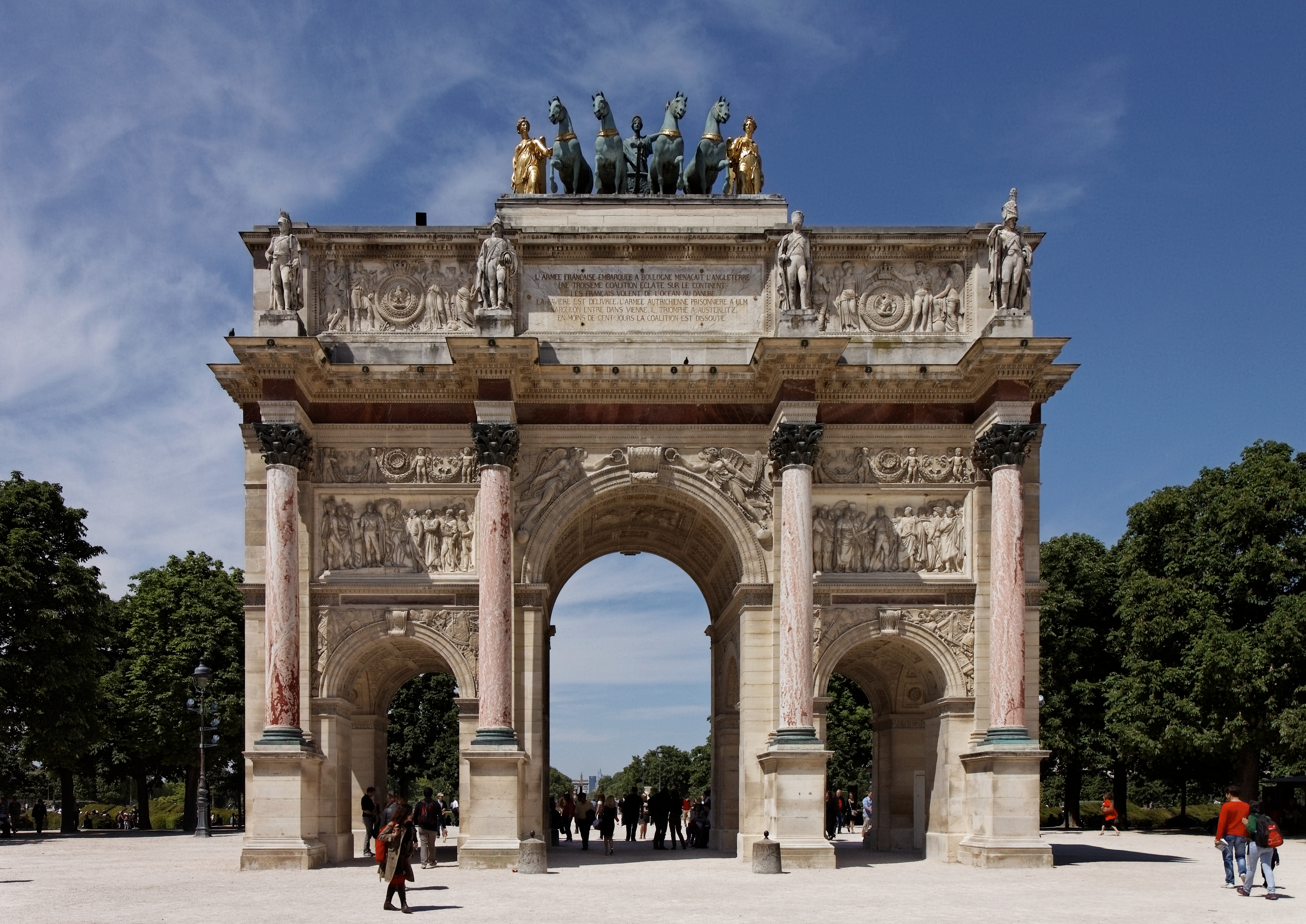
- Top: The Petit Trianon (Versailles, France), 1764, by Ange-Jacques Gabriel; Centre: The Brandenburg Gate (Berlin, Germany), 1791, by Carl Gotthard Langhans; Bottom: Arc de Triomphe du Carrousel (Paris), 1806–1808, by Pierre-François-Léonard Fontaine
- Years active: 18th century–mid-19th century
- Location: Western world
- Influences: Ancient Greek; Ancient Roman
- Influenced: Adam style; Empire; Federal; Greek Revival

Neoclassical architecture, sometimes referred to as Classical Revival architecture, is an architectural style produced by the Neoclassical movement that began in the mid-18th century in Italy, France and Germany. It became one of the most prominent architectural styles in the Western world. The prevailing styles of architecture in most of Europe for the previous two centuries, Renaissance architecture and Baroque architecture, already represented partial revivals of the Classical architecture of ancient Rome and ancient Greek architecture, but the Neoclassical movement aimed to strip away the excesses of Late Baroque and return to a purer, more complete, and more authentic classical style, adapted to modern purposes.

The development of archaeology and published accurate records of surviving classical buildings was crucial in the emergence of Neoclassical architecture. In many countries, there was an initial wave essentially drawing on Roman architecture, followed, from about the start of the 19th century, by a second wave of Greek Revival architecture. This followed increased understanding of Greek survivals. As the 19th century continued, the style tended to lose its original rather austere purity in variants like the French Empire style. The term "neoclassical" is often used very loosely for any building using some of the classical architectural vocabulary.

In form, Neoclassical architecture emphasizes the wall rather than chiaroscuro and maintains separate identities to each of its parts. The style is manifested both in its details as a reaction against the Rococo style of naturalistic ornament, and in its architectural formulae as an outgrowth of some classicizing features of the Late Baroque architectural tradition. Therefore, the style is defined by symmetry, simple geometry, and social demands instead of ornament. In the 21st century, a version of the style continues, sometimes called New Classical architecture or New Classicism.

== History ==
Neoclassical architecture is a specific style and moment in the late 18th and early 19th centuries that was specifically associated with the Enlightenment, empiricism, and the study of sites by early archaeologists. Classical architecture after about 1840 must be classified as one of a series of "revival" styles, such as Greek, Renaissance, or Italianate. Various historians of the 19th century have made this clear since the 1970s. Classical architecture during the 20th century is classified less as a revival, and more a return to a style that was decelerated with the advent of Modernism. Yet still Neoclassical architecture is beginning to be practiced again in the 21st century more in the form of New Classical architecture and even in Gentrification and Historicism Architecture, the Neoclassical architecture or its important elements are still being used, even when Postmodern architecture is dominant throughout the world.

=== Palladianism ===
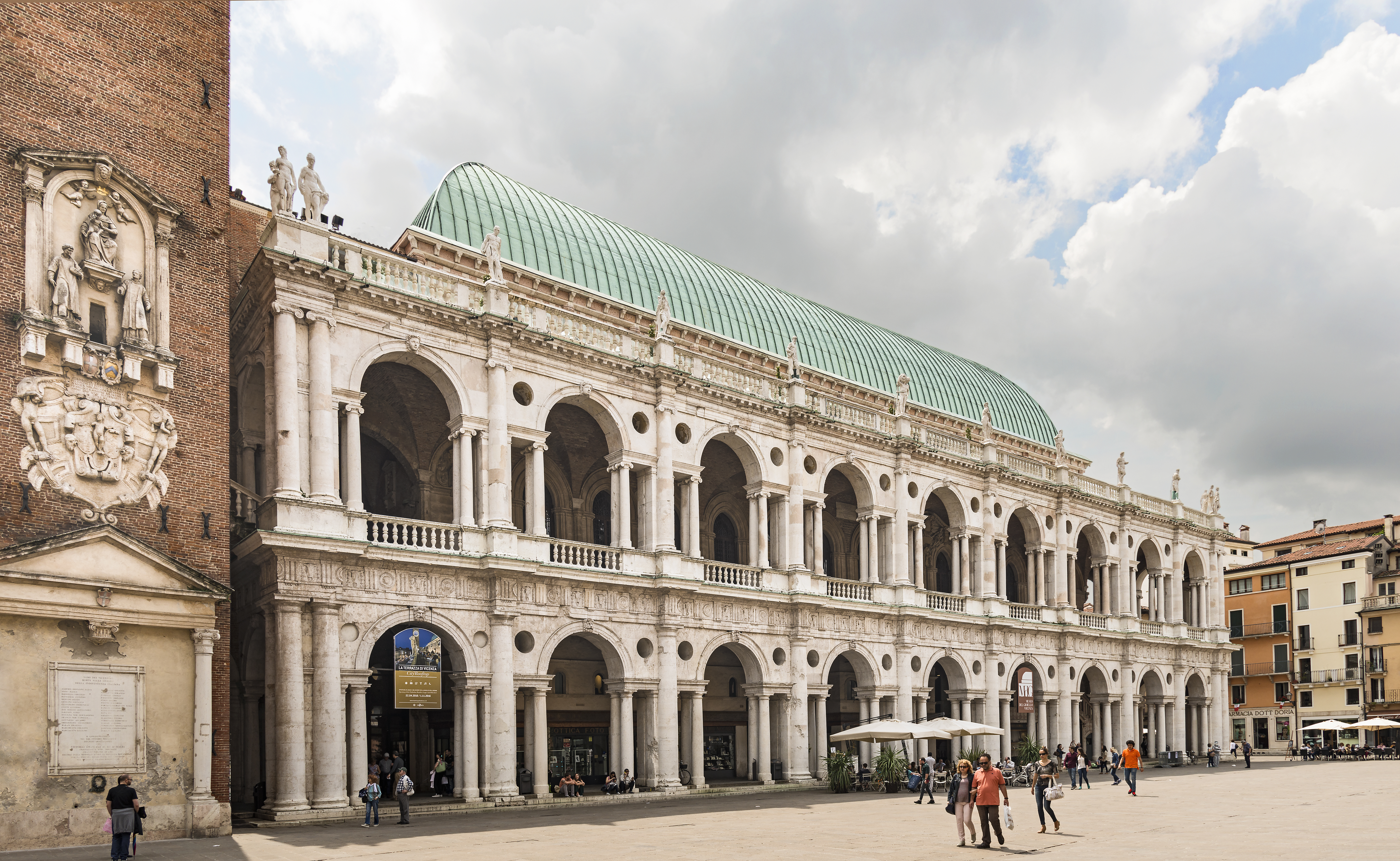
The Basilica Palladiana at Vicenza in Veneto, Italy

A return to more classical architectural forms as a reaction to the Rococo style can be detected in some European architecture of the earlier 18th century, most vividly represented in the Palladian architecture of Georgian Britain and Ireland. The name refers to the designs of the 16th-century Venetian architect Andrea Palladio.

The Baroque style had never truly been to the English taste. Four influential books were published in the first quarter of the 18th century which highlighted the simplicity and purity of classical architecture: Vitruvius Britannicus by Colen Campbell (1715), Palladio's I quattro libri dell'architettura (Venice, 1570), which first appeared complete in English as The Architecture of A. Palladio, in Four Books, translated by Giacomo Leoni (London, 1715), De re aedificatoria by Leon Battista Alberti (first published in 1452) and The Designs of Inigo Jones... with Some Additional Designs (1727). The most popular was the four-volume Vitruvius Britannicus by Colen Campbell. The book contained architectural prints of famous British buildings that had been inspired by the great architects from Vitruvius to Palladio. At first the book mainly featured the work of Inigo Jones, but the later tomes contained drawings and plans by Campbell and other 18th-century architects. Palladian architecture became well established in 18th-century Britain.

At the forefront of the new school of design was the aristocratic "architect earl", Richard Boyle, 3rd Earl of Burlington; in 1729, he and William Kent designed Chiswick House. This house was a reinterpretation of Palladio's Villa Capra "La Rotonda", but purified of 16th-century elements and ornament. This severe lack of ornamentation was to be a feature of Palladianism. In 1734, William Kent and Lord Burlington designed one of England's finest examples of Palladian architecture, Holkham Hall in Norfolk. The main block of this house followed Palladio's dictates quite closely, but Palladio's low, often detached, wings of farm buildings were elevated in significance.

This classicizing vein was also detectable, to a lesser degree, in the Late Baroque architecture in Paris, such as in the Louvre Colonnade. This shift was even visible in Rome at the redesigned façade for Archbasilica of Saint John Lateran.

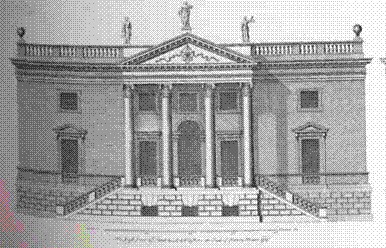
The east façade of Stourhead House, based on Palladio's Villa Emo

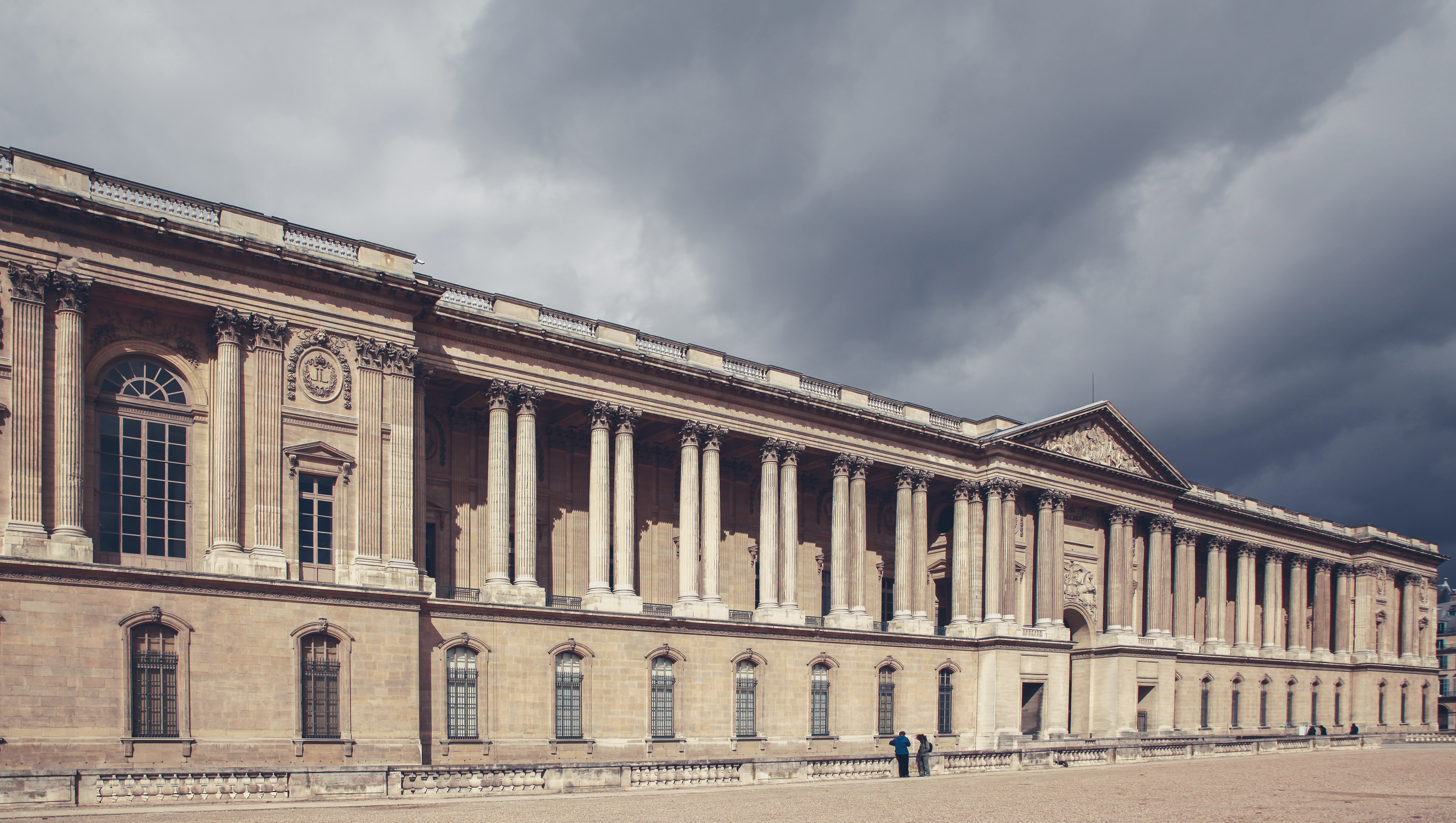
Louvre Colonnade, Paris, 1667–1674

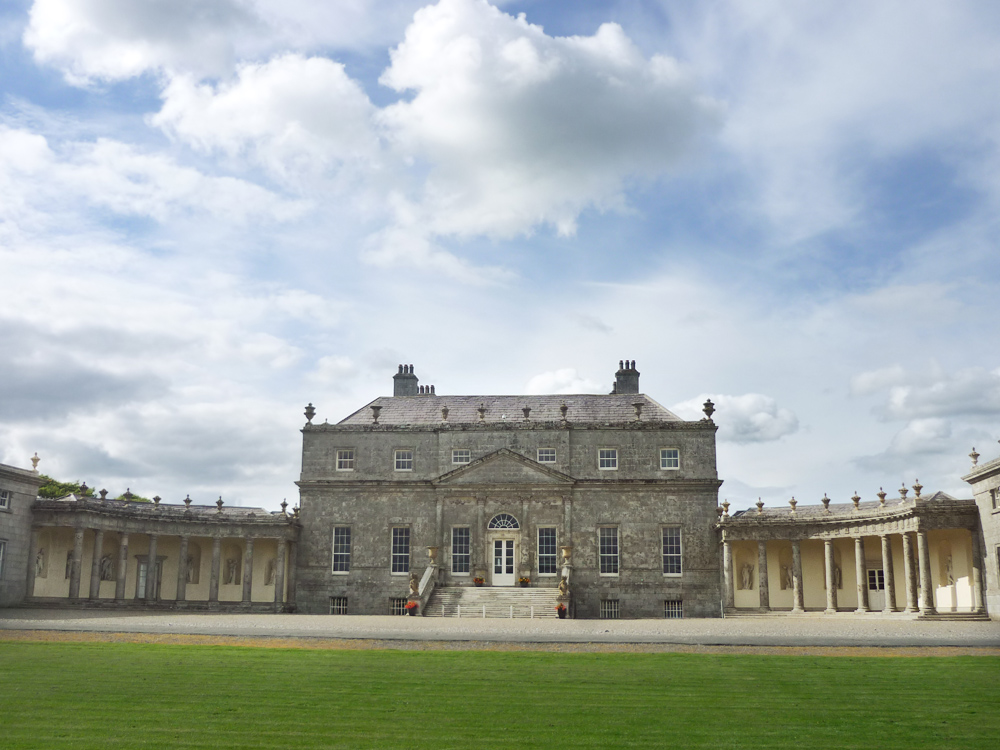
Russborough House, County Wicklow, Ireland. A notable example of Irish Palladianism, 1741–1755, by Richard Cassels

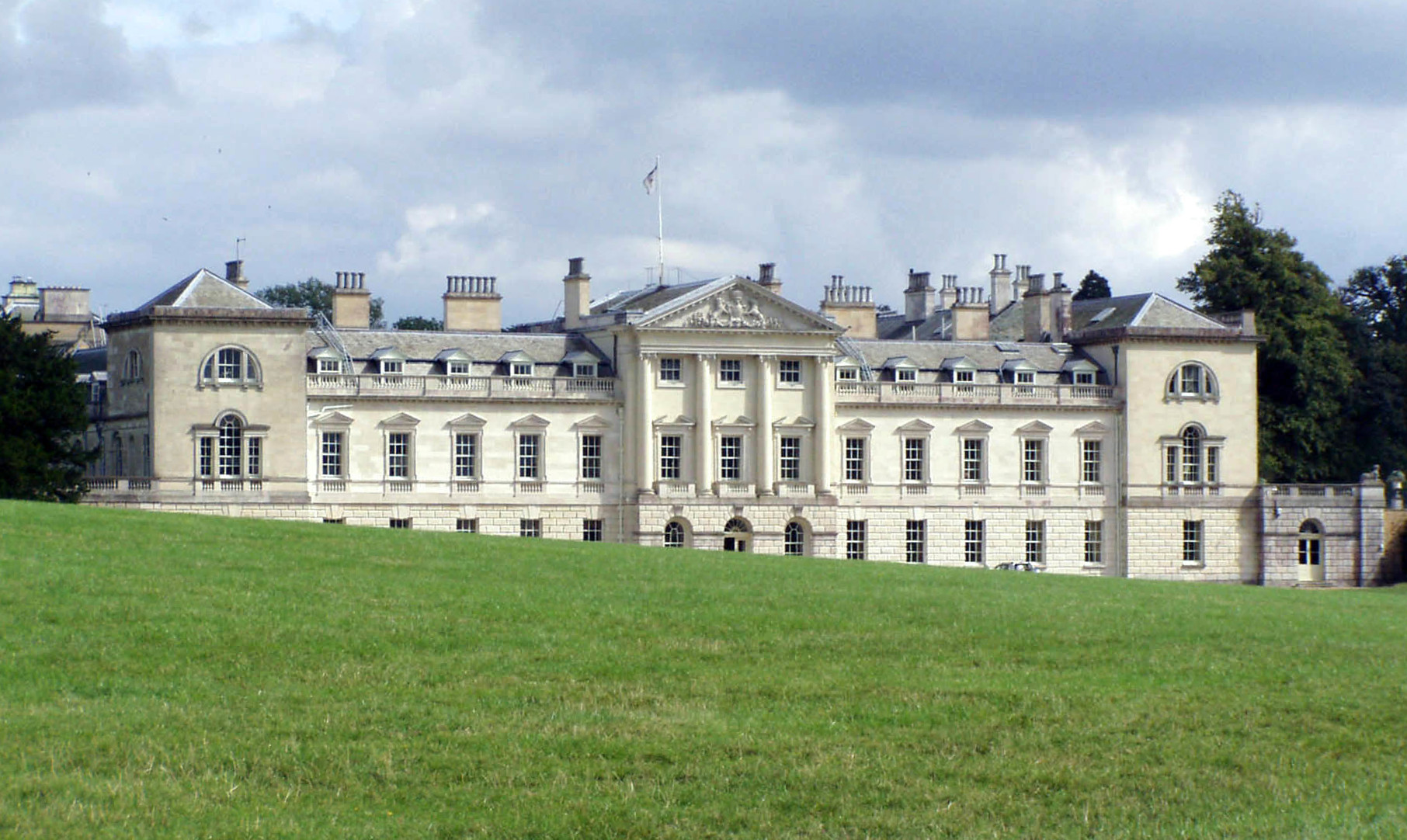
Woburn Abbey, Woburn, Bedfordshire, England, 1746, by Henry Flitcroft

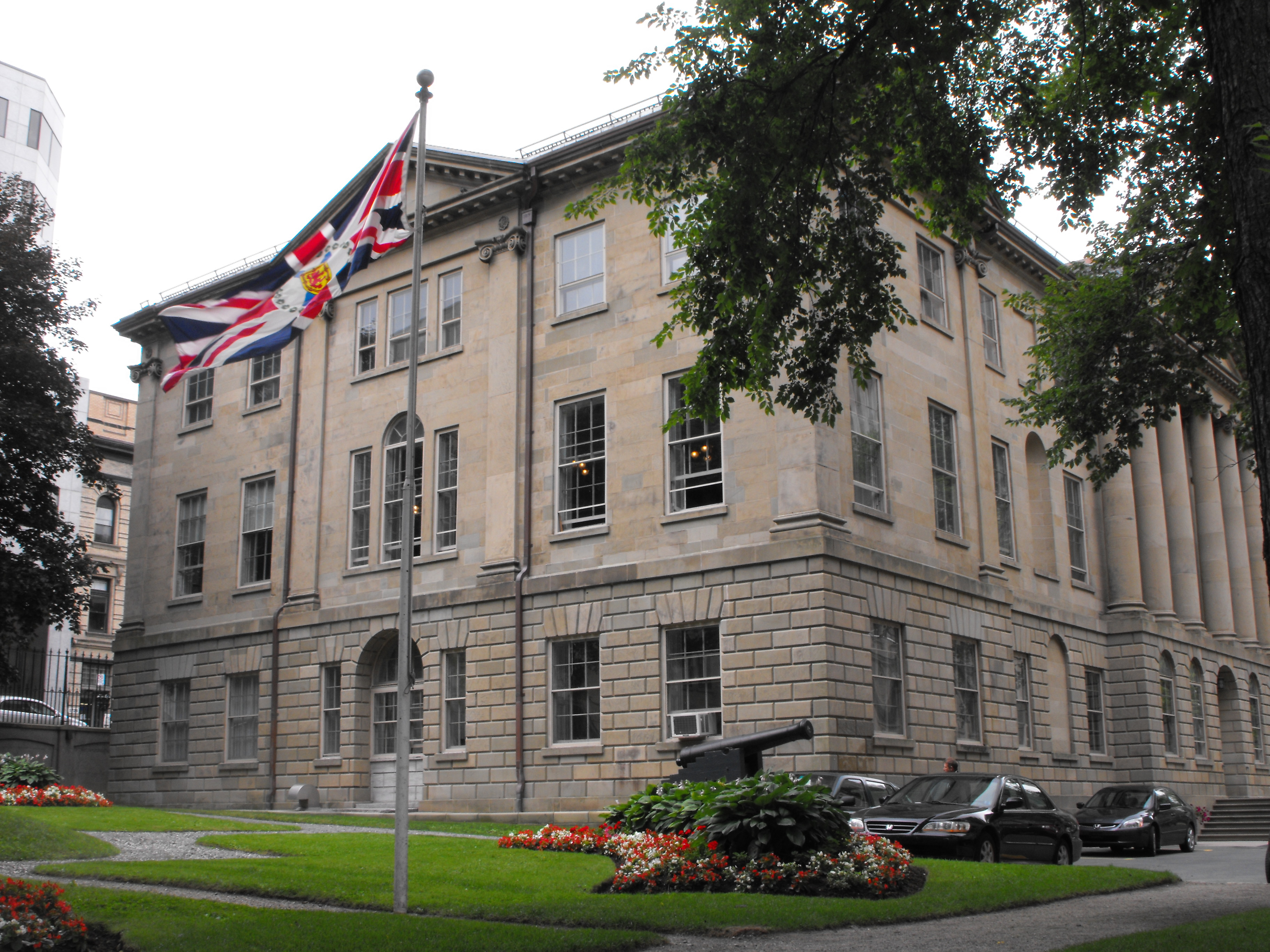
Nova Scotia Legislature Building from Halifax, Nova Scotia, Canada, 1819

=== Neoclassicism ===
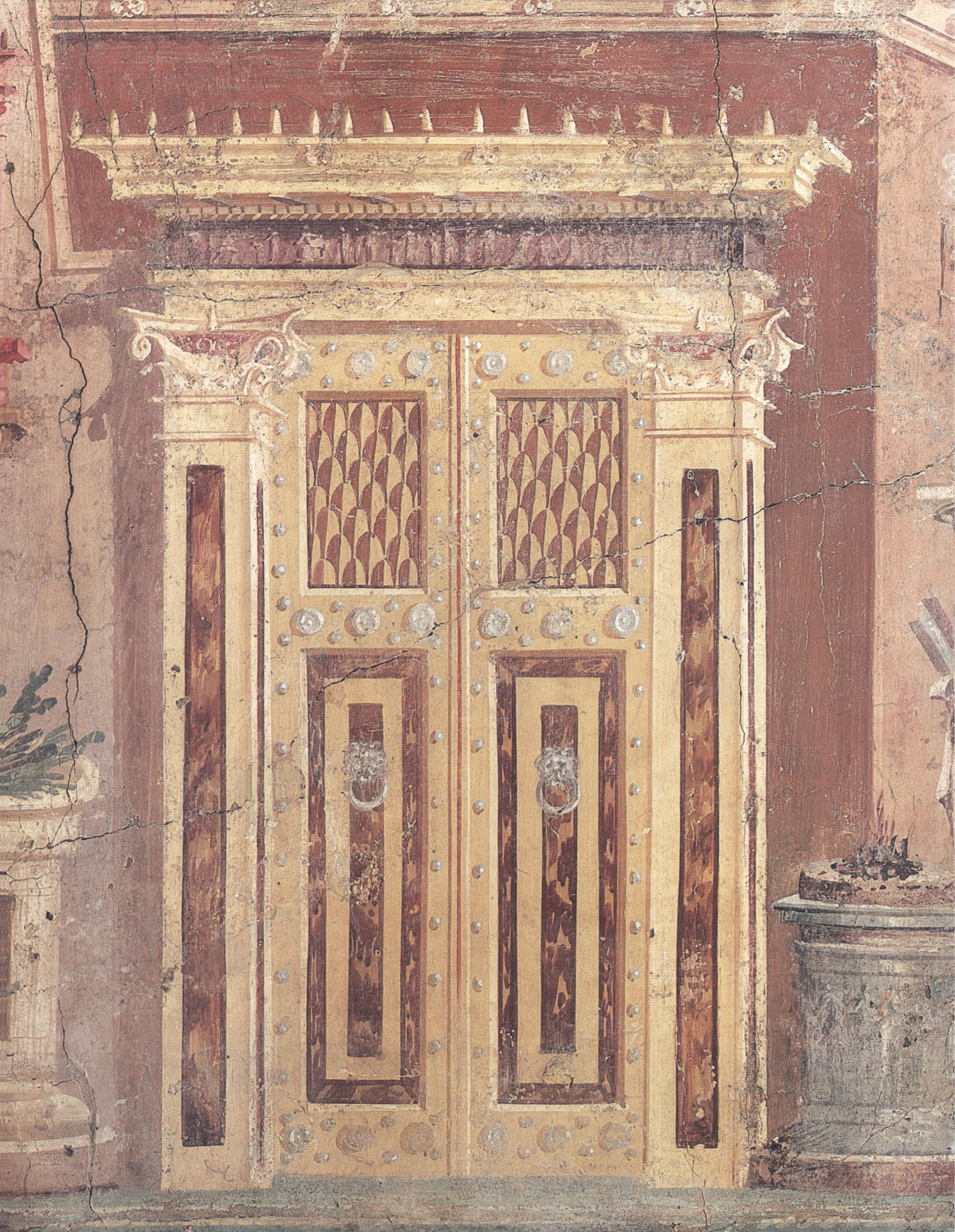
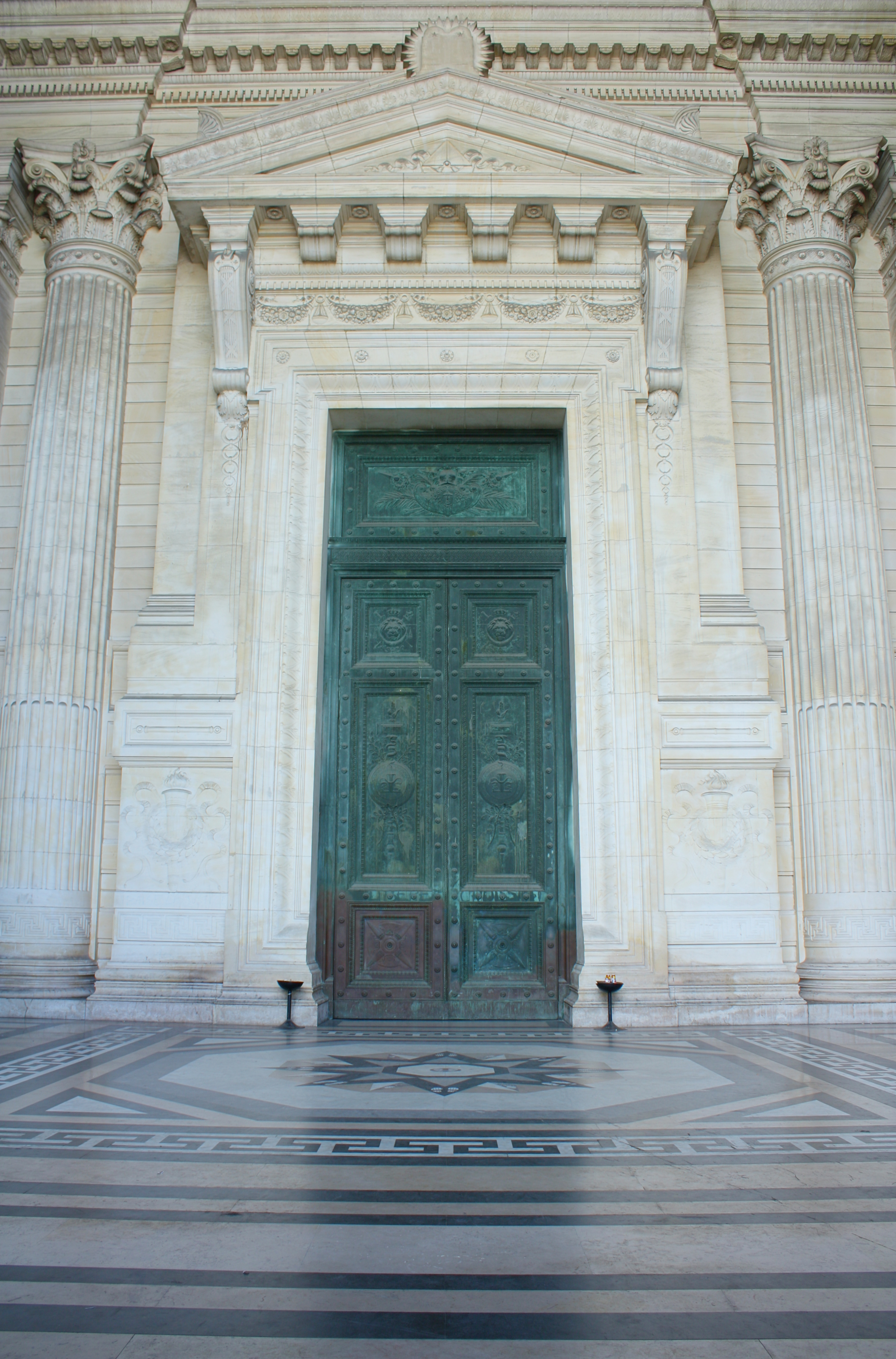
Comparison between a 1st-century (AD) Roman wall painting of an ornate door, in the Villa Boscoreale, Italy; and a massive 19th-century Neoclassical door of the Palais de Justice, Brussels, Belgium

By the mid-18th century, the movement broadened to incorporate a greater range of classical influences, including those from Ancient Greece. An early centre of neoclassicism was Italy, especially Naples, where by the 1730s court architects such as Luigi Vanvitelli and Ferdinando Fuga were recovering classical, Palladian and Mannerist forms in their Baroque architecture. Following their lead, Giovanni Antonio Medrano began to build the first truly neoclassical structures in Italy in the 1730s. In the same period, Alessandro Pompei introduced neoclassicism to the Venetian Republic, building one of the first lapidariums in Europe in Verona, in the Doric style (1738). During the same period, neoclassical elements were introduced to Tuscany by architect Jean Nicolas Jadot de Ville-Issey, the court architect of Francis Stephen of Lorraine. On Jadot's lead, an original neoclassical style was developed by Gaspare Maria Paoletti, transforming Florence into the most important centre of neoclassicism in the peninsula. In the second half of the century, Neoclassicism flourished also in Turin, Milan (Giuseppe Piermarini) and Trieste (Matteo Pertsch). In the latter two cities, just as in Tuscany, the sober neoclassical style was linked to the reformism of the ruling Habsburg enlightened monarchs.

The shift to neoclassical architecture is conventionally dated to the 1750s. It first gained influence in England and France; in England, Sir William Hamilton's excavations at Pompeii and other sites, the influence of the Grand Tour, and the work of William Chambers and Robert Adam, were pivotal in this regard. In France, the movement was propelled by a generation of French art students trained in Rome, and was influenced by the writings of Johann Joachim Winckelmann. The style was also adopted by progressive circles in other countries such as Sweden and Russia.

International neoclassical architecture was exemplified in Karl Friedrich Schinkel's buildings, especially the Altes Museum in Berlin, Sir John Soane's Bank of England in London and the newly built White House and Capitol in Washington, D.C. of the nascent American Republic. The style was international. The Baltimore Basilica, which was designed by Benjamin Henry Latrobe in 1806, is considered one of the finest examples of neoclassical architecture in the world.

A second neoclassic wave, more severe, more studied and more consciously archaeological, is associated with the height of the First French Empire. In France, the first phase of neoclassicism was expressed in the Louis XVI style, and the second in the styles called Directoire and Empire. Its major proponents were Percier and Fontaine, court architects who specialized in interior decoration.

In the decorative arts, neoclassicism is exemplified in French furniture of the Empire style; the English furniture of Chippendale, George Hepplewhite and Robert Adam, Wedgwood's bas reliefs and "black basaltes" vases, and the Biedermeier furniture of Austria. The Scottish architect Charles Cameron created palatial Italianate interiors for the German-born Catherine the Great in Saint Petersburg.

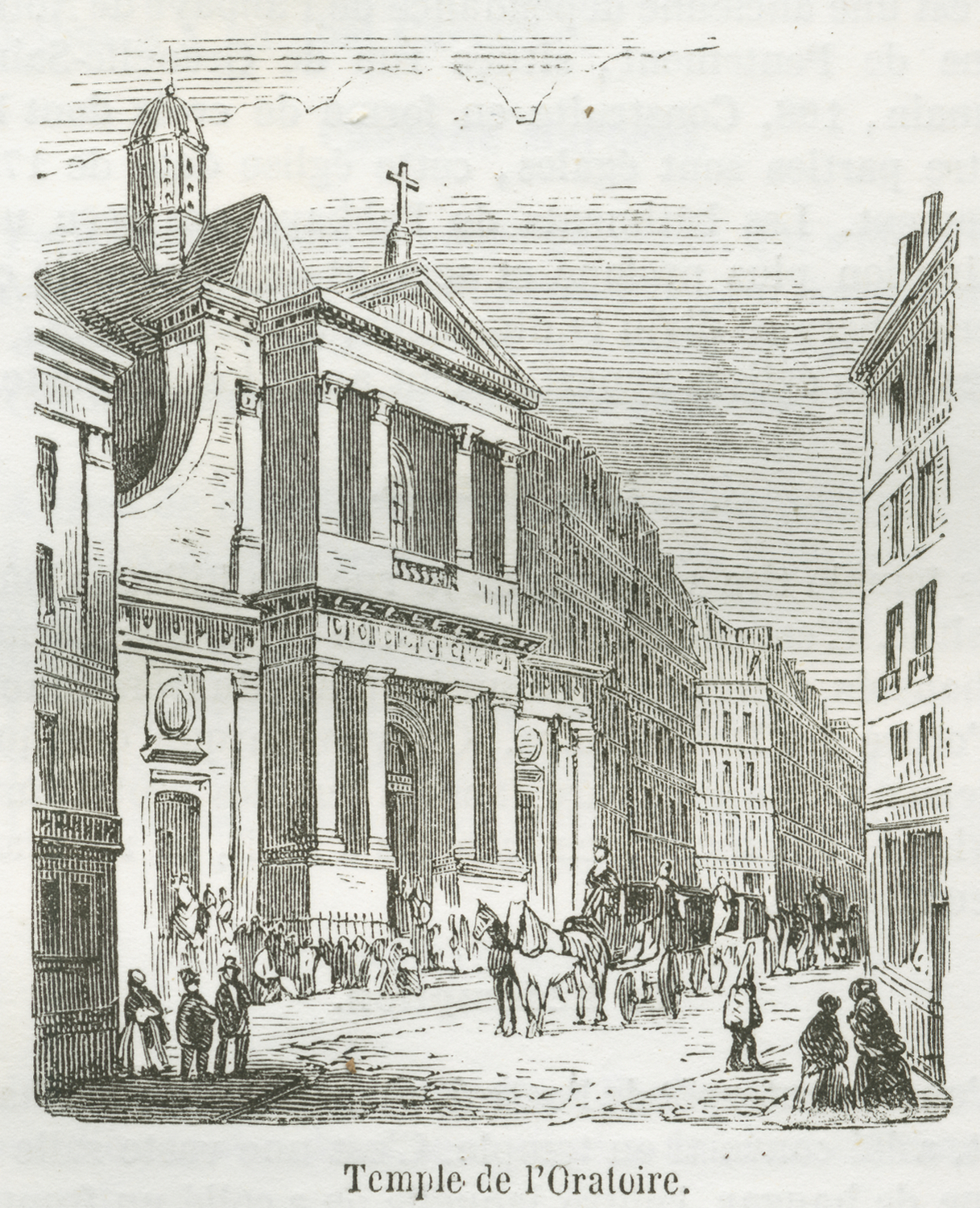
Oratire du Louvre façade (1855)

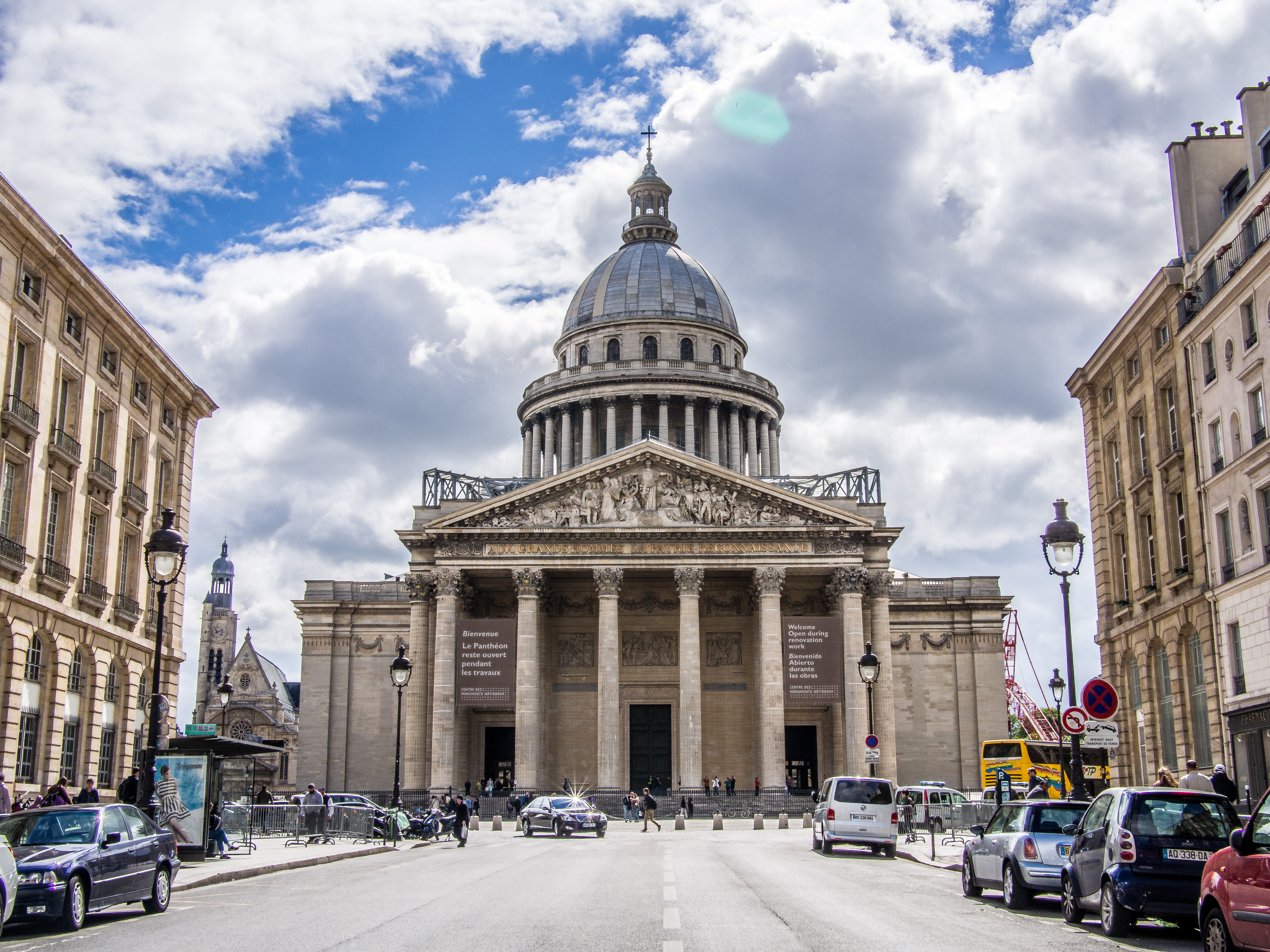
The Panthéon, Paris, 1758–1790

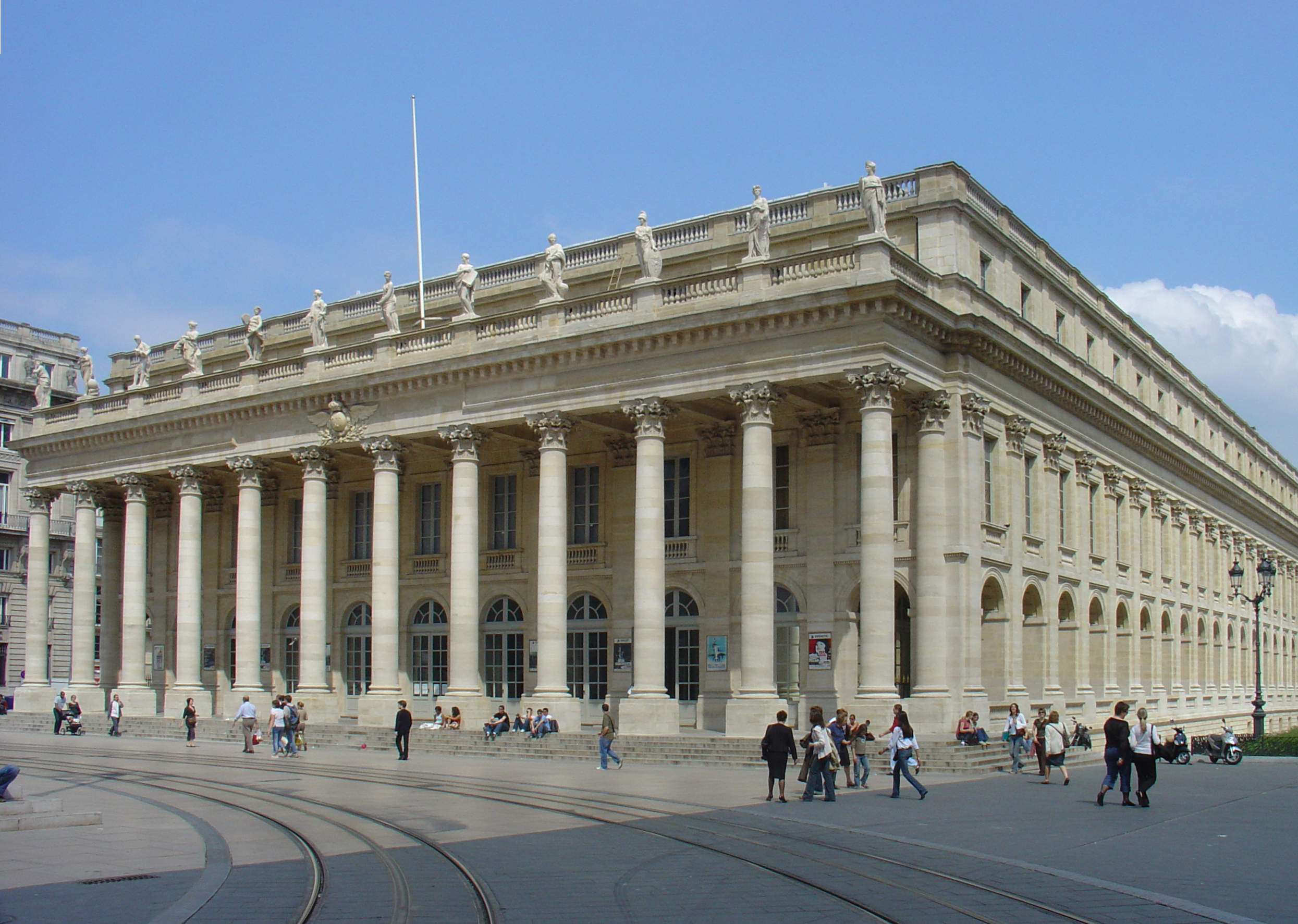
The Grand Theater, Bordeaux, by Victor Louis, 1773–1780

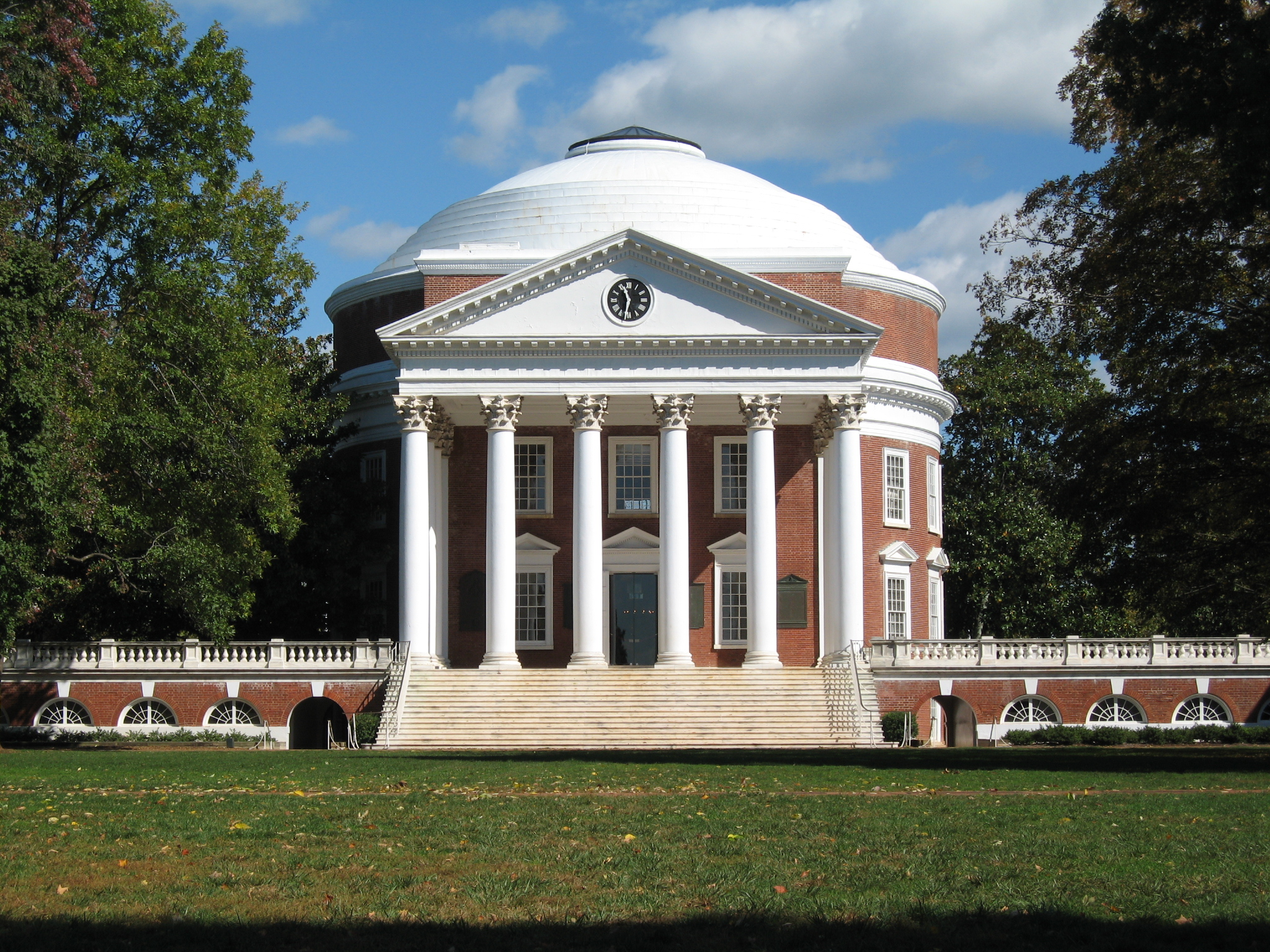
The Rotunda (University of Virginia), Charlottesville, Virginia, by Thomas Jefferson and Stanford White, 1826

The Academy of Athens, 1859, by Theophil Hansen

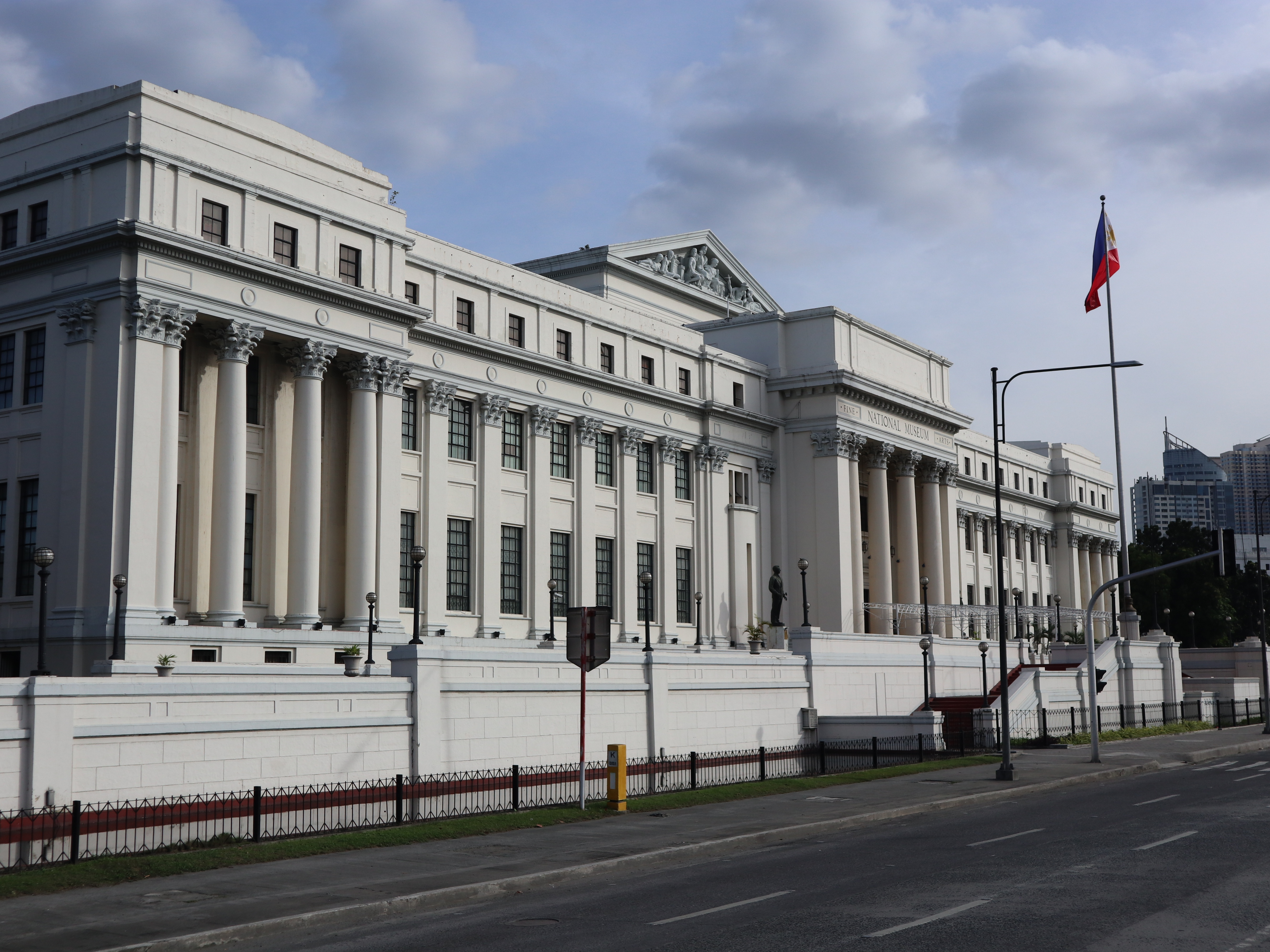
Old Legislative Building (Manila), Philippines, 1918 and rebuilt in 1945

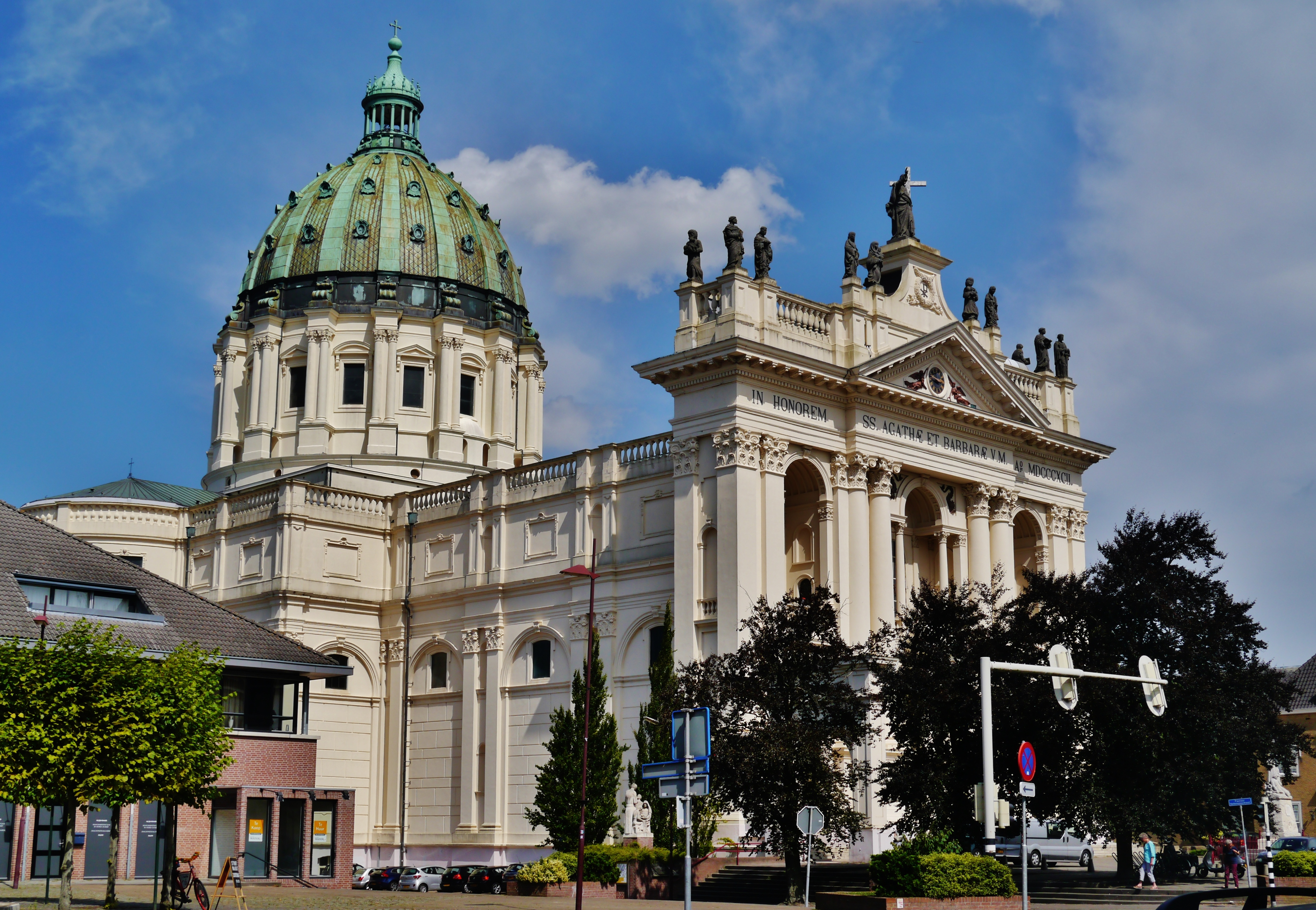
Oudenbosch Basilica, 1892 (Oudenbosch, The Netherlands)

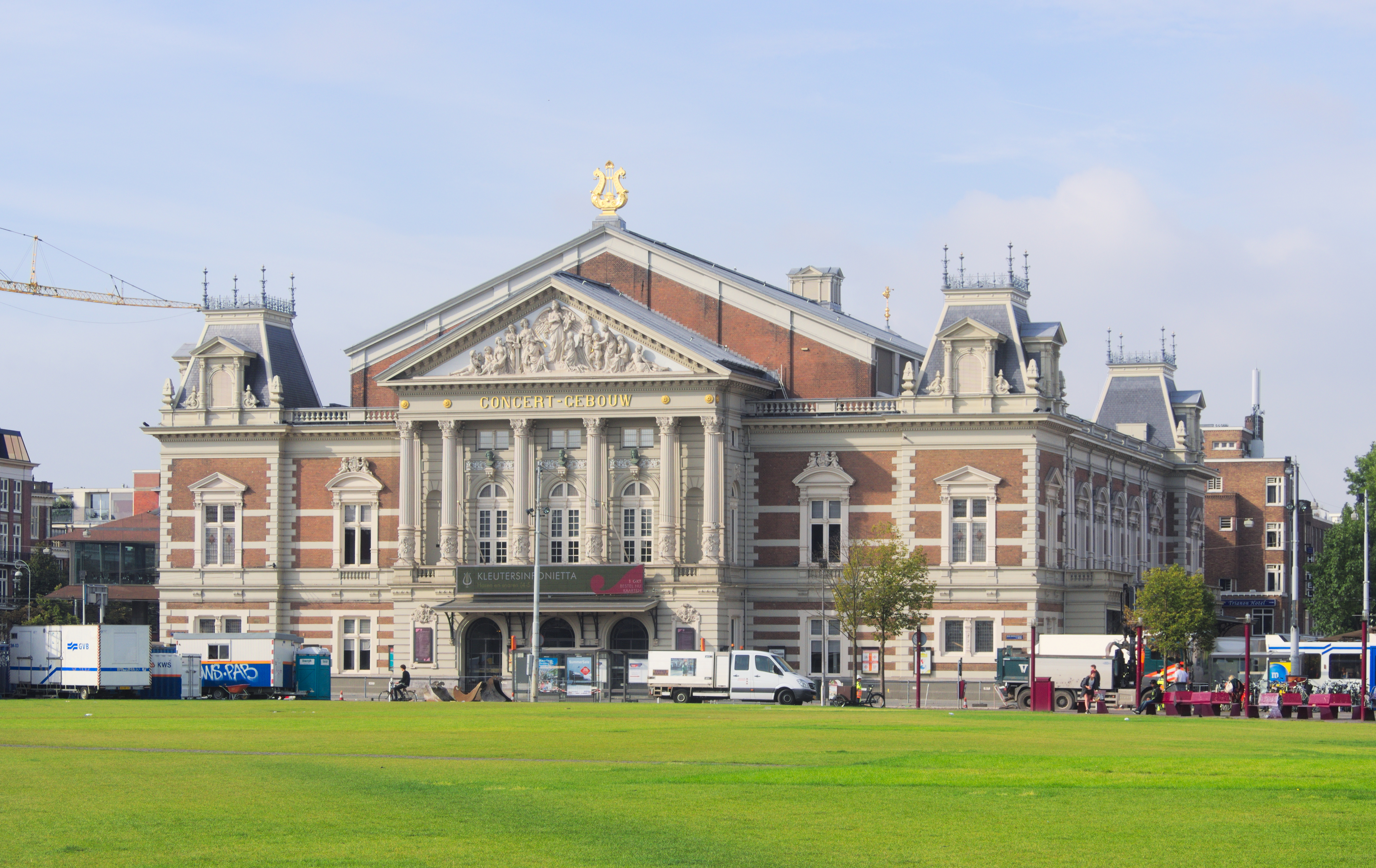
Concertgebouw, Amsterdam, The Netherlands, 1886

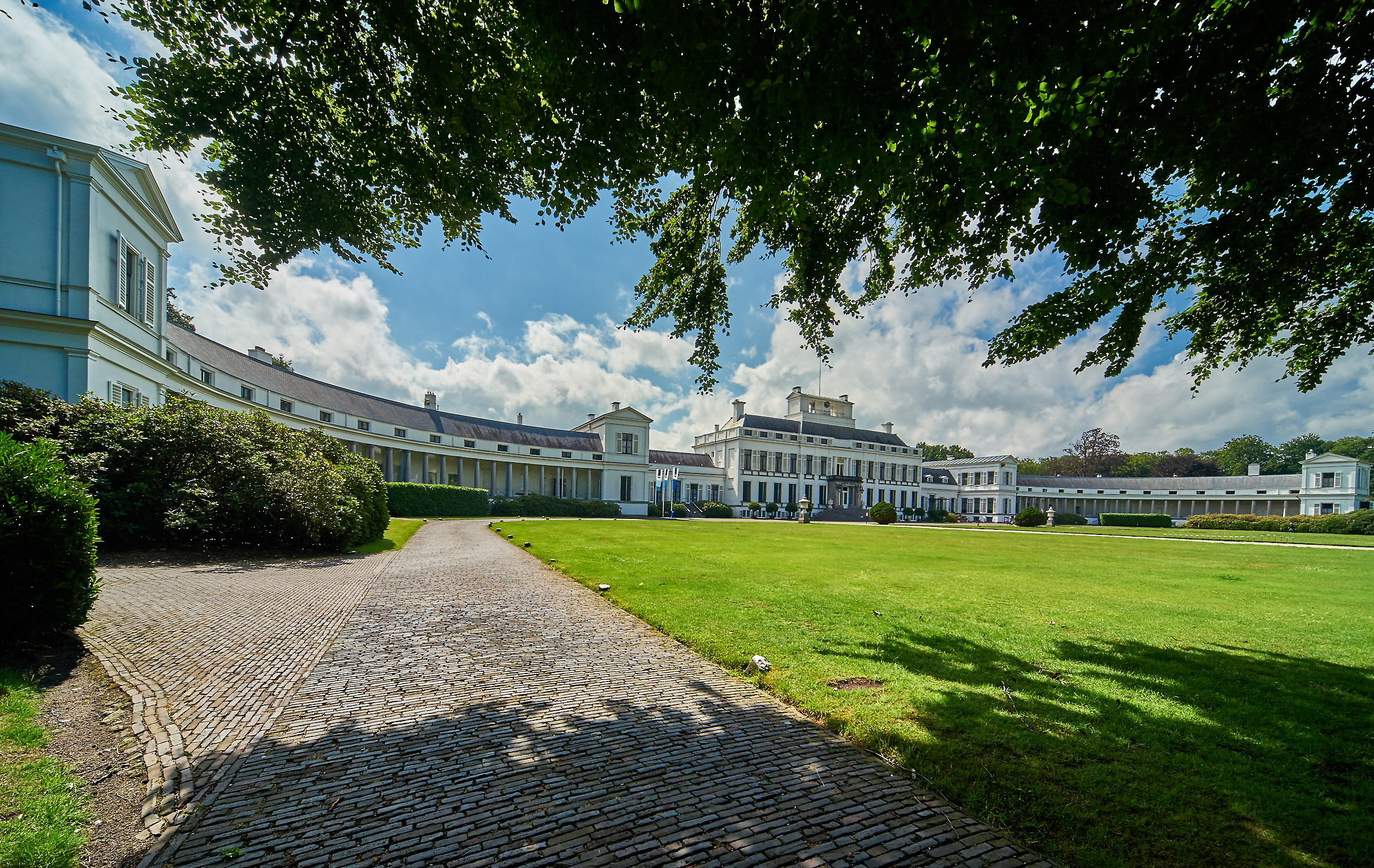
Soestdijk Palace, The Netherlands, more times Renovated

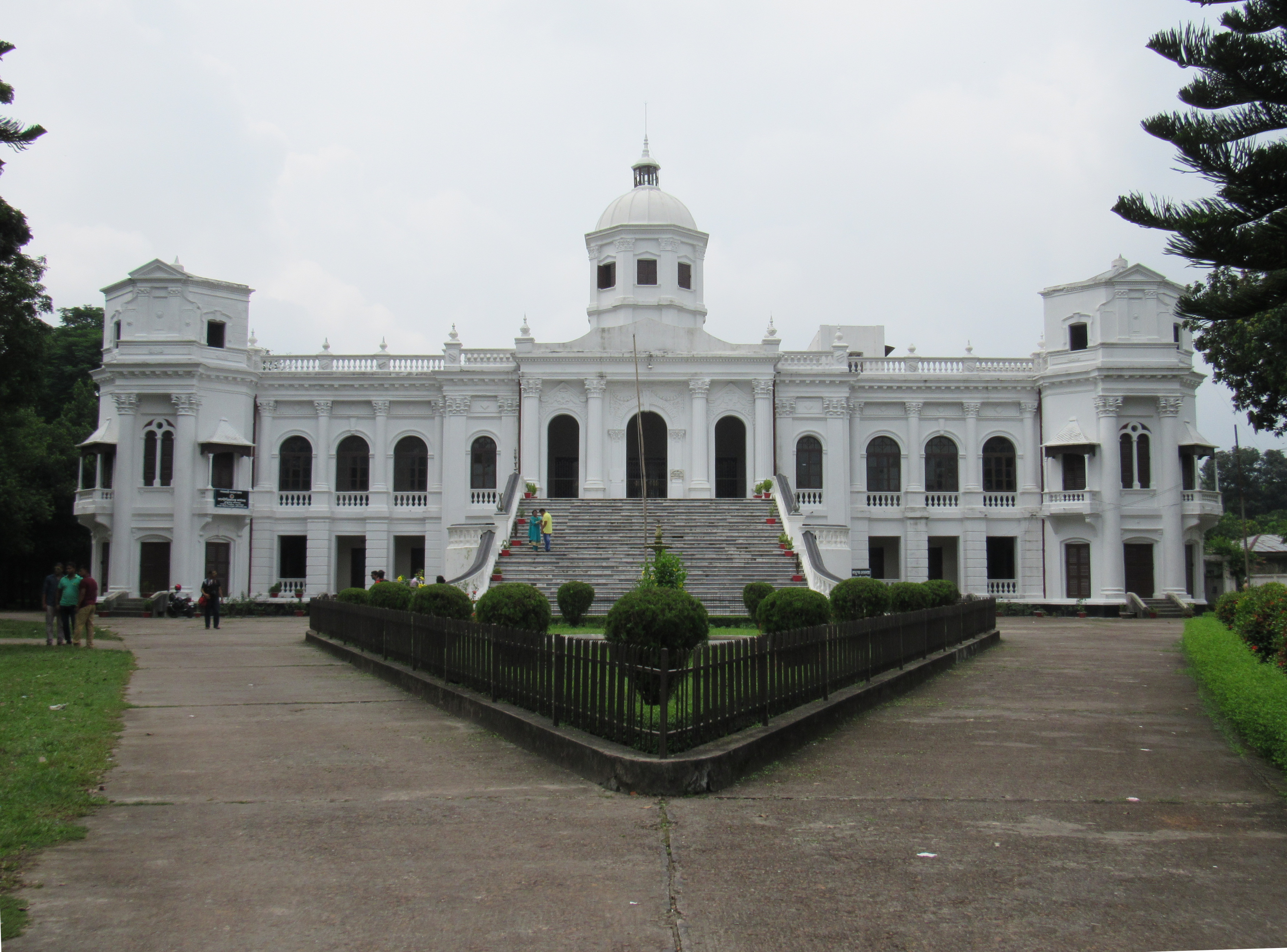
Tajhat Palace, late 19th century (Rangpur, Bangladesh)

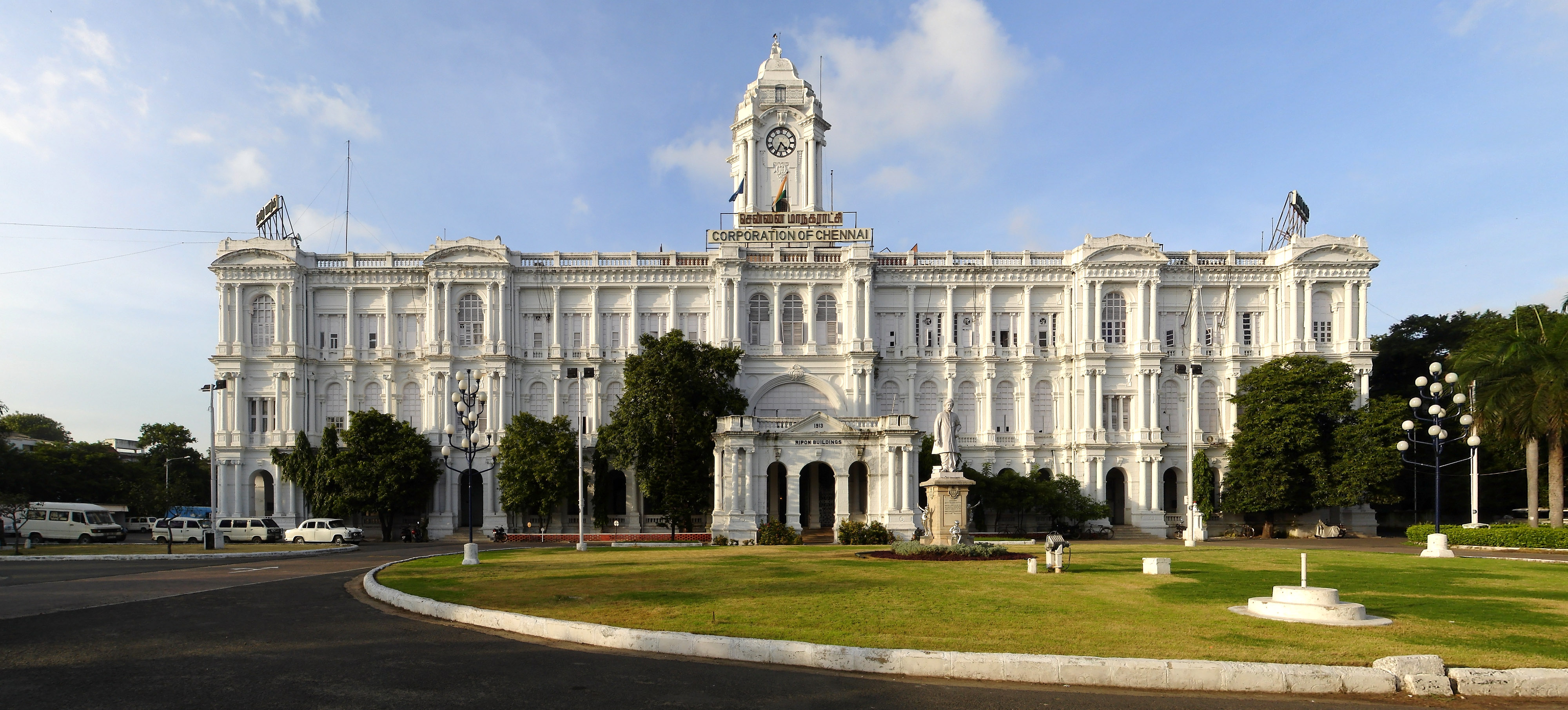
Ripon Building, 1909 (Chennai, India)

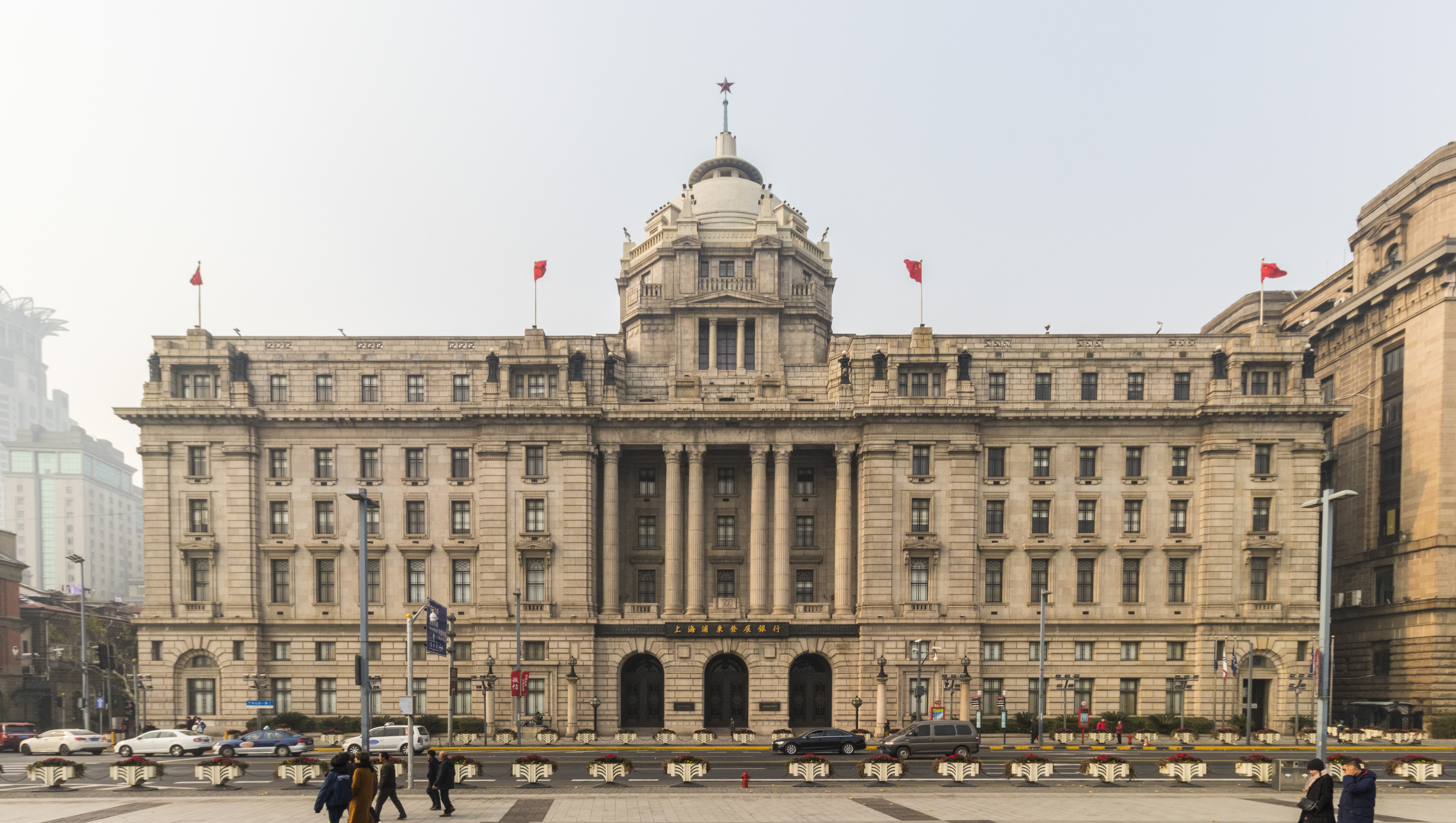
HSBC Building, 1923 (Shanghai, China)

=== Interior design ===
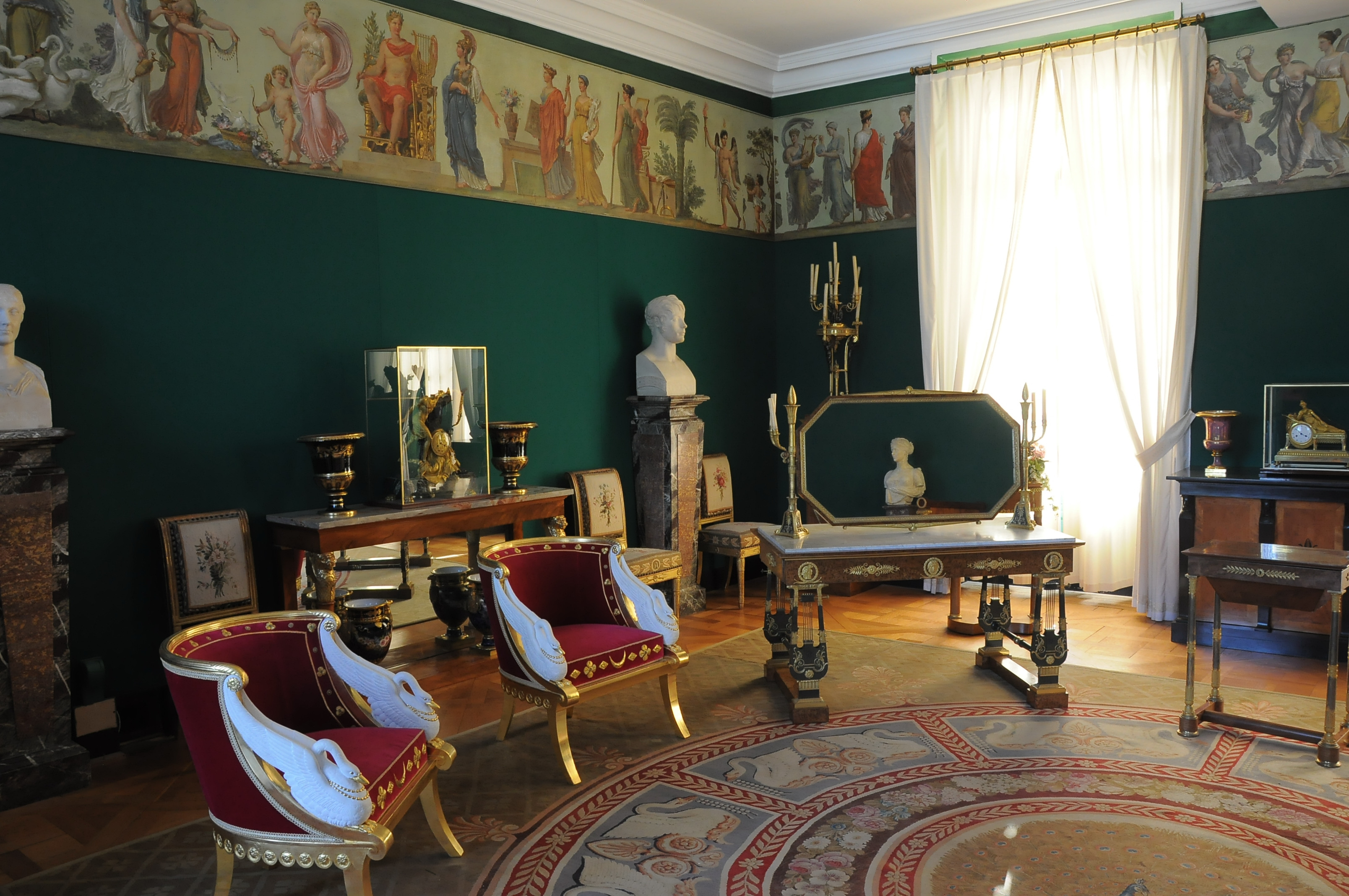
Château de Malmaison, 1800, room for the Empress Joséphine, on the cusp between Directoire and Empire style

Indoors, neoclassicism made a discovery of the genuine classic interior, inspired by the rediscoveries at Pompeii and Herculaneum. These had begun in the late 1740s, but only achieved a wide audience in the 1760s, with the first luxurious volumes of tightly controlled distribution of Le Antichità di Ercolano Esposte (The Antiquities of Herculaneum Exposed). The antiquities of Herculaneum showed that even the most classicizing interiors of the Baroque, or the most "Roman" rooms of William Kent were based on basilica and temple exterior architecture turned outside in, hence their often bombastic appearance to modern eyes: pedimented window frames turned into gilded mirrors, fireplaces topped with temple fronts.

The new interiors sought to recreate an authentically Roman and genuinely interior vocabulary. Techniques employed in the style included flatter, lighter motifs, sculpted in low frieze-like relief or painted in monotones en camaïeu ("like cameos"), isolated medallions or vases or busts or bucrania or other motifs, suspended on swags of laurel or ribbon, with slender arabesques against backgrounds, perhaps, of "Pompeiian red" or pale tints, or stone colours. The style in France was initially a Parisian style, the goût grec ("Greek taste"), not a court style; when Louis XVI acceded to the throne in 1774, Marie Antoinette, his fashion-loving Queen, brought the Louis XVI style to court. However, there was no real attempt to employ the basic forms of Roman furniture until around the turn of the century, and furniture-makers were more likely to borrow from ancient architecture, just as silversmiths were more likely to take from ancient pottery and stone-carving than metalwork: "Designers and craftsmen [...] seem to have taken an almost perverse pleasure in transferring motifs from one medium to another".

A new phase in neoclassical design was inaugurated by Robert and James Adam, who travelled in Italy and Dalmatia in the 1750s, observing the ruins of the classical world. On their return to Britain, they published a book entitled The Works in Architecture in installments between 1773 and 1779. This book of engraved designs made the Adam style available throughout Europe. The Adam brothers aimed to simplify the Rococo and Baroque styles which had been fashionable in the preceding decades, to bring what they felt to be a lighter and more elegant feel to Georgian houses. The Works in Architecture illustrated the main buildings the Adam brothers had worked on and crucially documented the interiors, furniture and fittings, designed by the Adams.

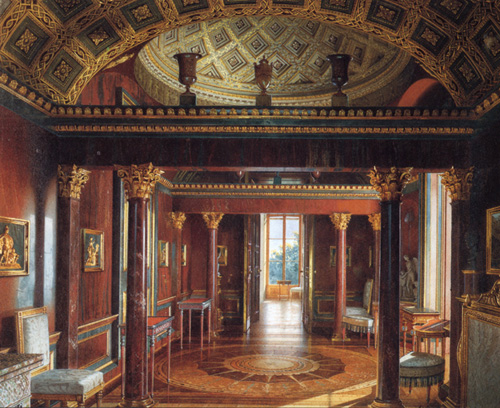
The Agate Pavilion, Tsarskoye Selo, designed by Charles Cameron in "Pompeian" style

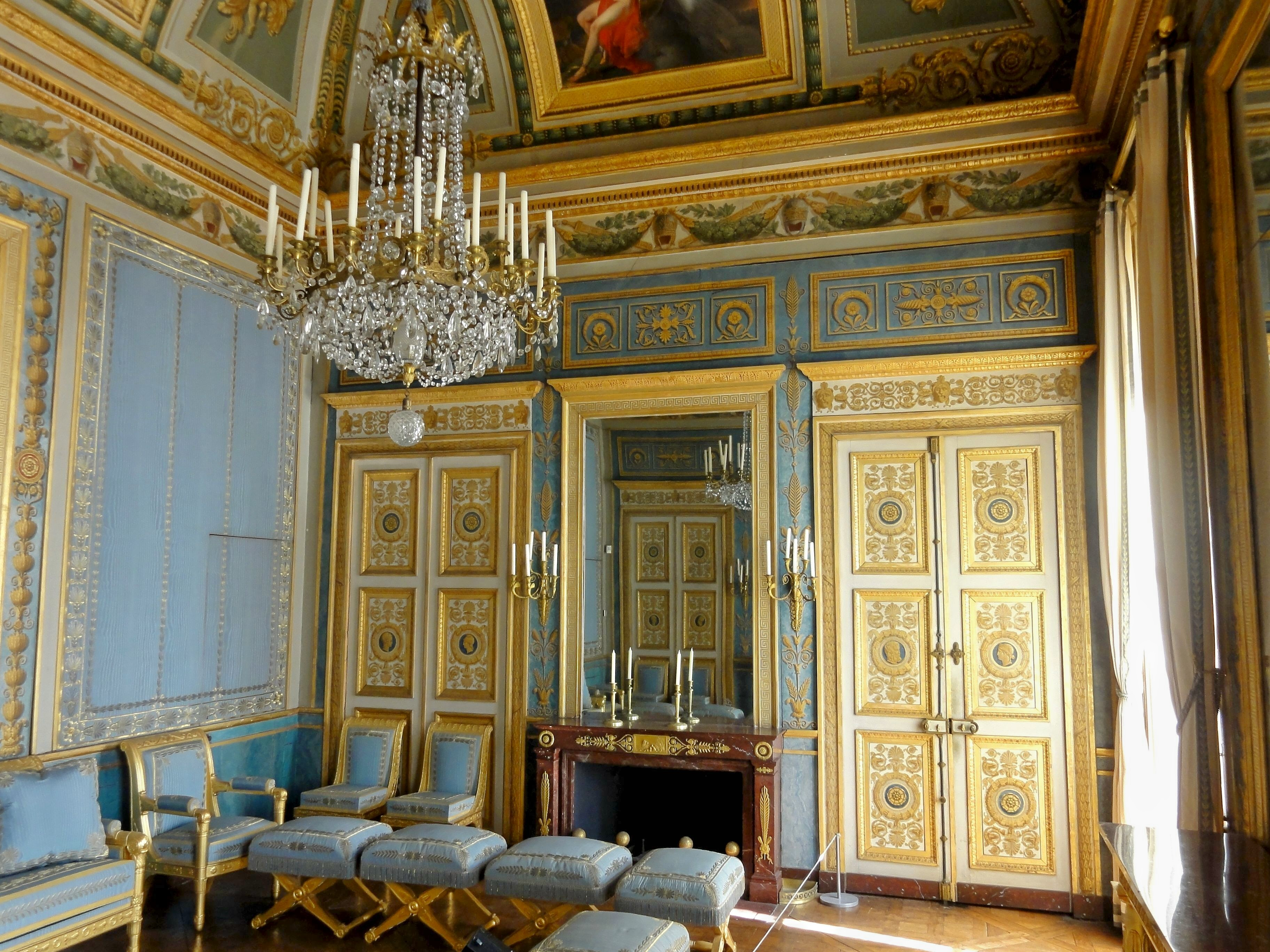
The Blue Salon of the Château de Compiègne (Compiègne, France), an example of an Empire interior

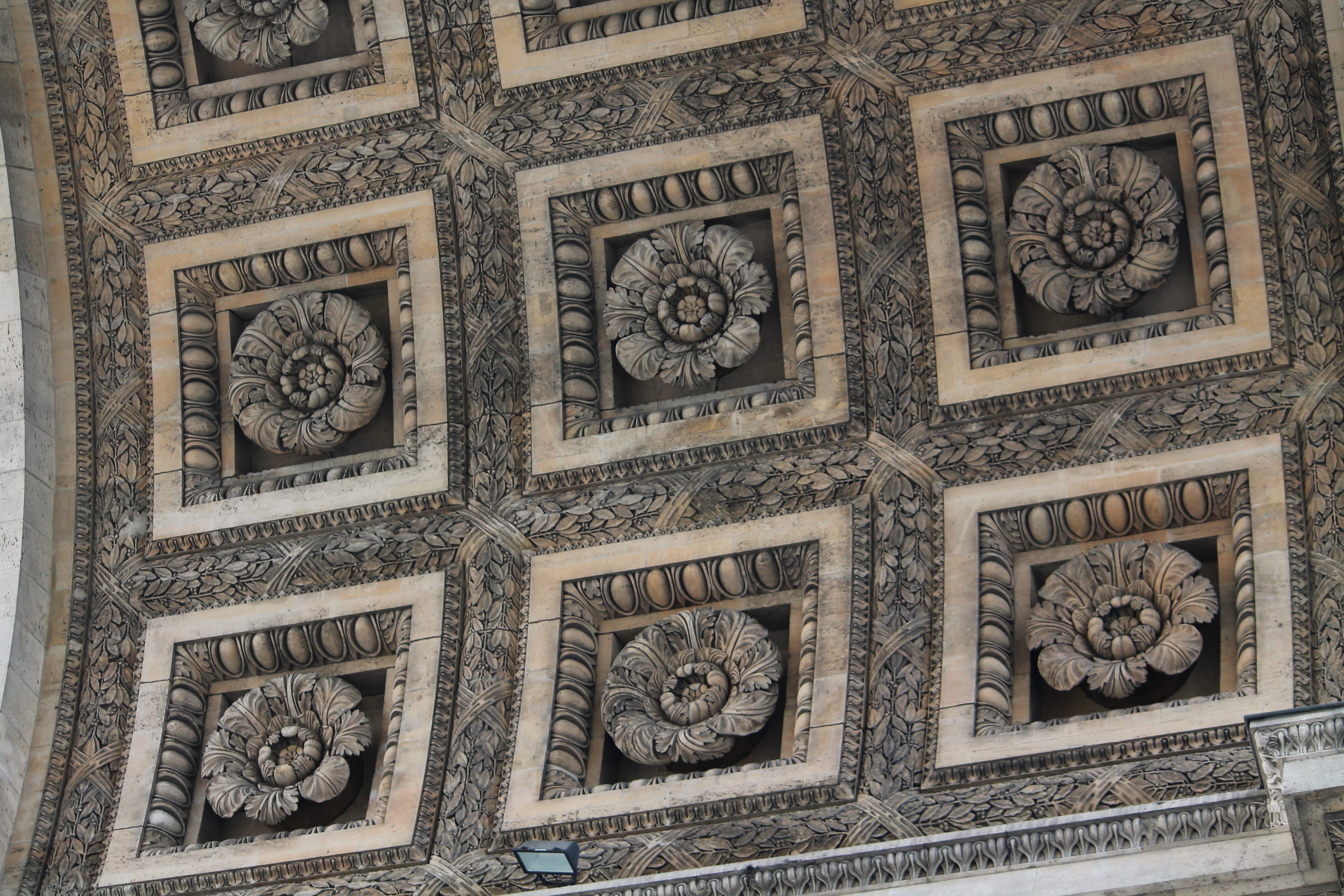
Detail of the ceiling of the Arc de Triomphe from Paris

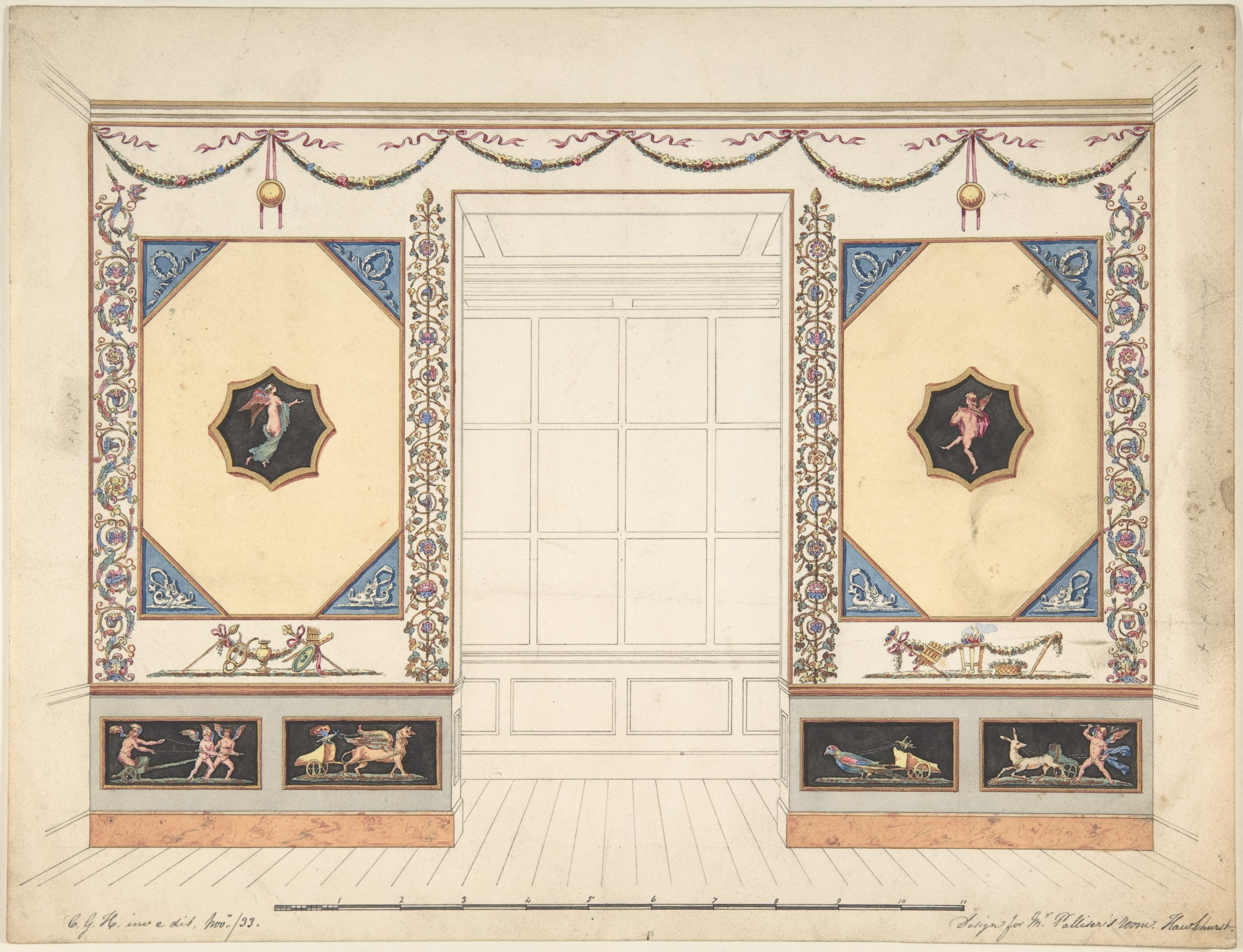
Design for a room in the Etruscan or Pompeian style, from 1833, in the Metropolitan Museum of Art (New York City)

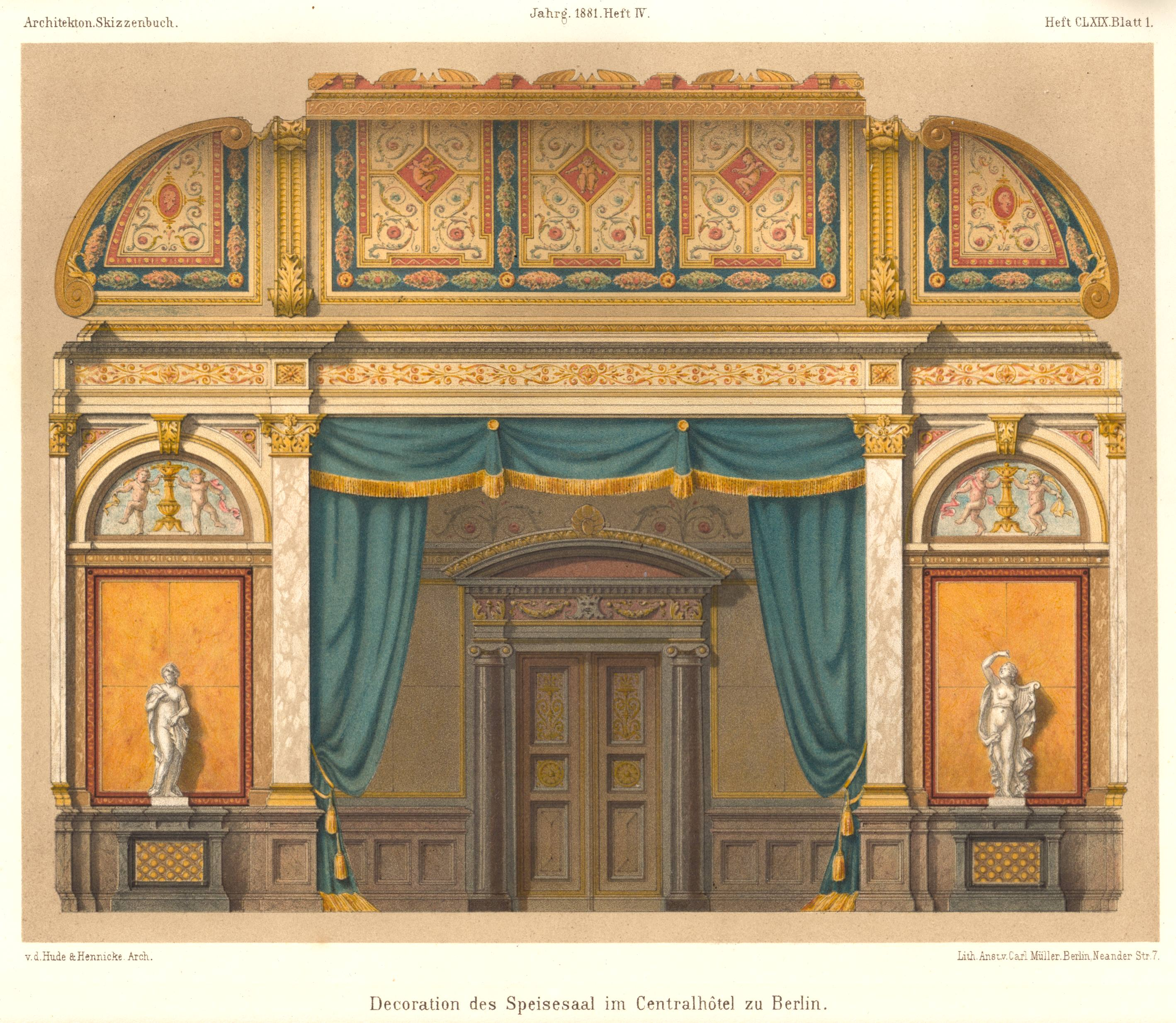
Dining room of the Centralhotel (Berlin), designed in 1881 by Hermann von der Hude & Julius Hennicke

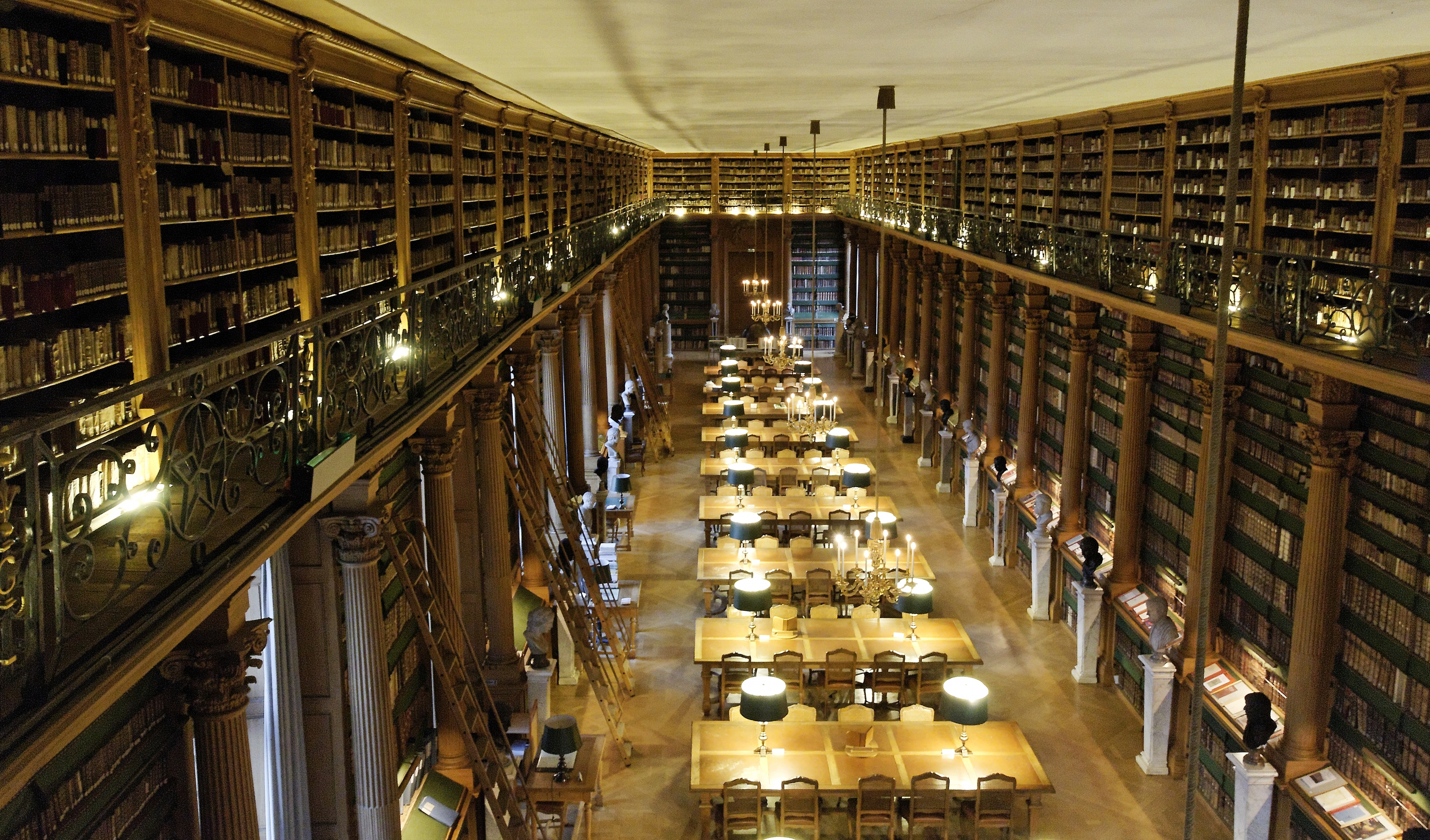
The Reading Room of the Bibliothèque Mazarine, Paris

=== Greek Revival ===
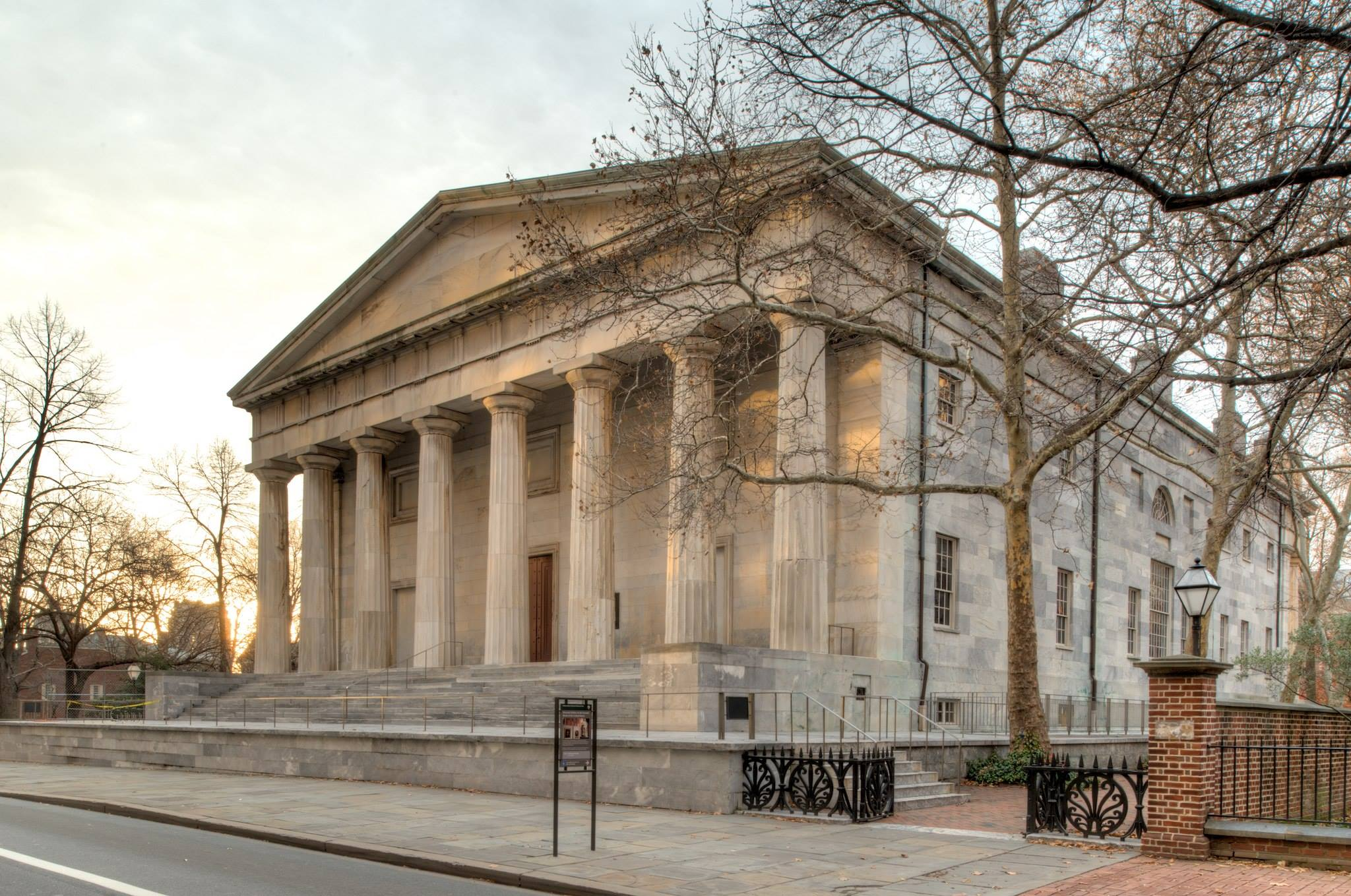
Second Bank of the United States, Philadelphia, 1818–1824, by William Strickland

From about 1800 a fresh influx of Greek architectural examples, seen through the medium of etchings and engravings, gave a new impetus to neoclassicism, the Greek Revival. There was little direct knowledge of surviving Greek buildings before the middle of the 18th century in Western Europe, when an expedition funded by the Society of Dilettanti in 1751 and led by James Stuart and Nicholas Revett began serious archaeological enquiry. Stuart was commissioned after his return from Greece by George Lyttelton to produce the first Greek building in England, the garden temple at Hagley Hall (1758–59). A number of British architects in the second half of the century took up the expressive challenge of the Doric from their aristocratic patrons, including Joseph Bonomi the Elder and John Soane, but it was to remain the private enthusiasm of connoisseurs up to the first decade of the 19th century.

Seen in its wider social context, Greek Revival architecture sounded a new note of sobriety and restraint in public buildings in Britain around 1800 as an assertion of nationalism attendant on the Act of Union, the Napoleonic Wars, and the clamour for political reform. It was to be William Wilkins's winning design for the public competition for Downing College, Cambridge, that announced the Greek style was to be the dominant idiom in architecture. Wilkins and Robert Smirke went on to build some of the most important buildings of the era, including the Theatre Royal, Covent Garden (1808–1809), the General Post Office (1824–1829) and the British Museum (1823–1848), Wilkins University College London (1826–1830) and the National Gallery (1832–1838). In Scotland, Thomas Hamilton (1784–1858), in collaboration with the artists Andrew Wilson (1780–1848) and Hugh William Williams (1773–1829) created monuments and buildings of international significance; the Burns Monument at Alloway (1818) and the Royal High School, Edinburgh (1823–1829).

At the same time the Empire style in France was a more grandiose wave of neoclassicism in architecture and the decorative arts. Mainly based on Imperial Roman styles, it originated in, and took its name from, the rule of Napoleon I in the First French Empire, where it was intended to idealize Napoleon's leadership and the French state. The style corresponds to the more bourgeois Biedermeier style in the German-speaking lands, Federal style in the United States, the Regency style in Britain, and the Napoleonstil in Sweden. According to the art historian Hugh Honour "so far from being, as is sometimes supposed, the culmination of the Neo-classical movement, the Empire marks its rapid decline and transformation back once more into a mere antique revival, drained of all the high-minded ideas and force of conviction that had inspired its masterpieces".

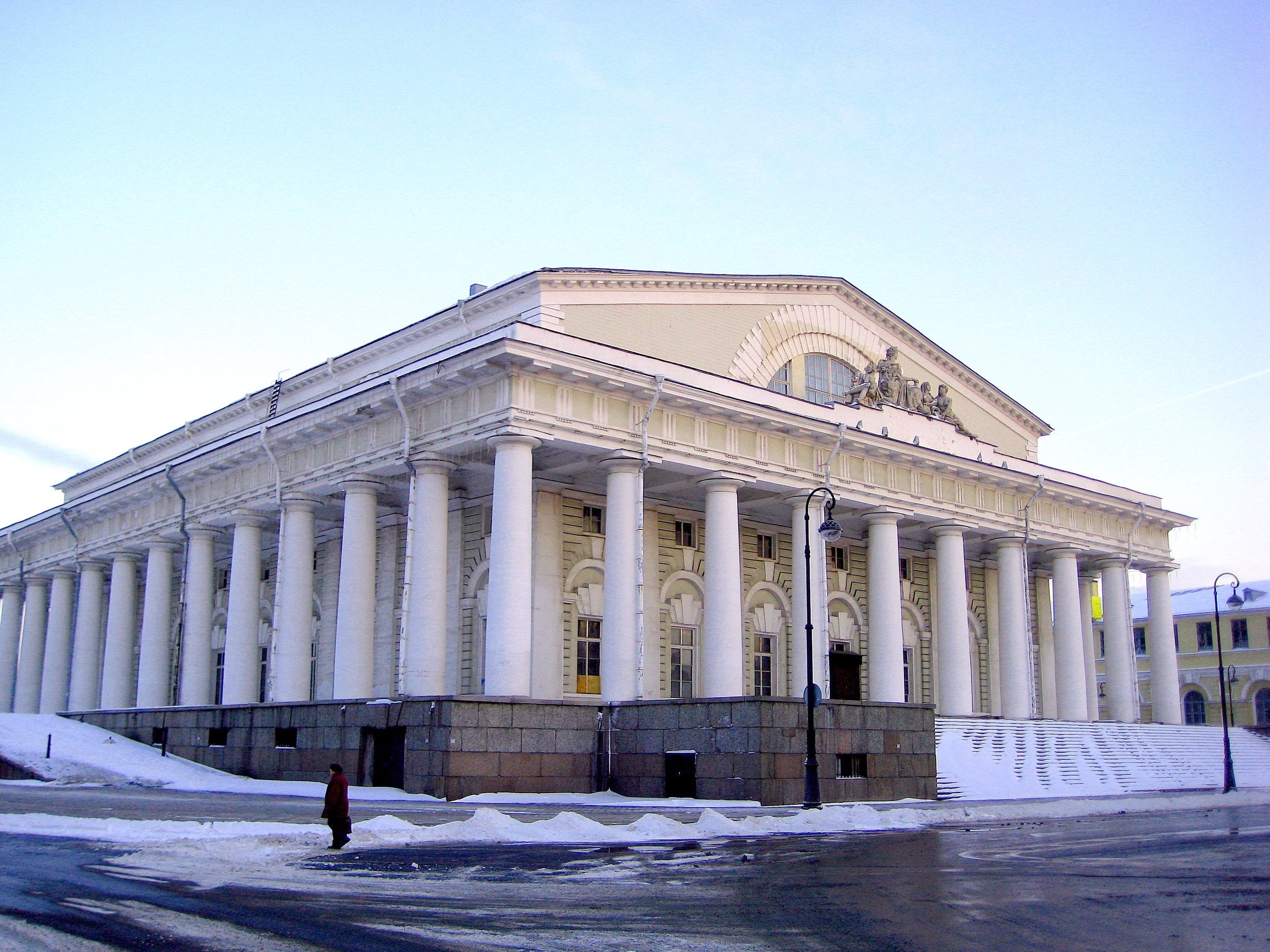
Old Saint Petersburg Stock Exchange, by Jean-François Thomas de Thomon, 1805–1810

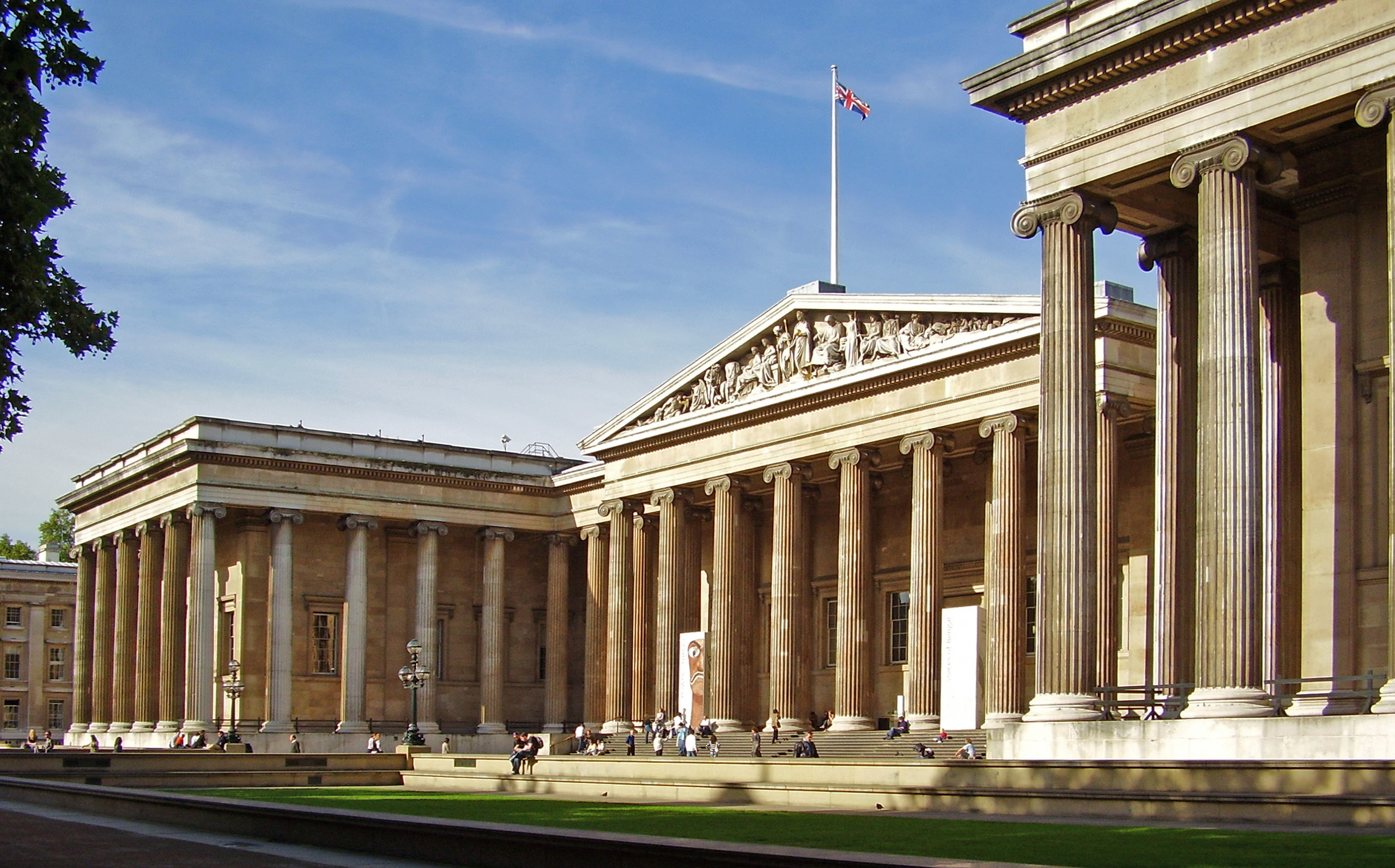
British Museum, London, by Robert Smirke, 1823–1847

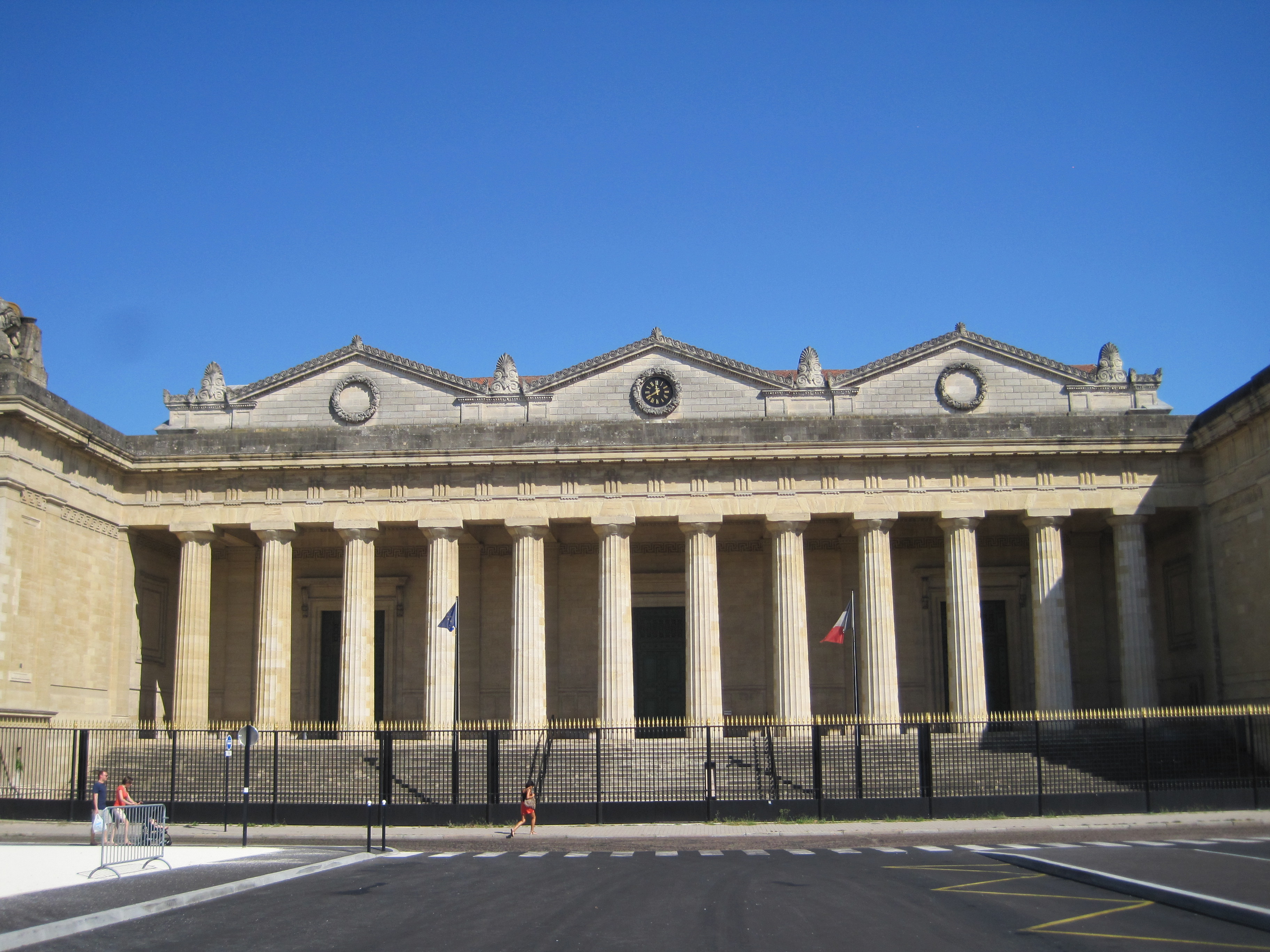
Bordeaux Courthouse, Bordeaux, France, unknown architect, 1839–1846

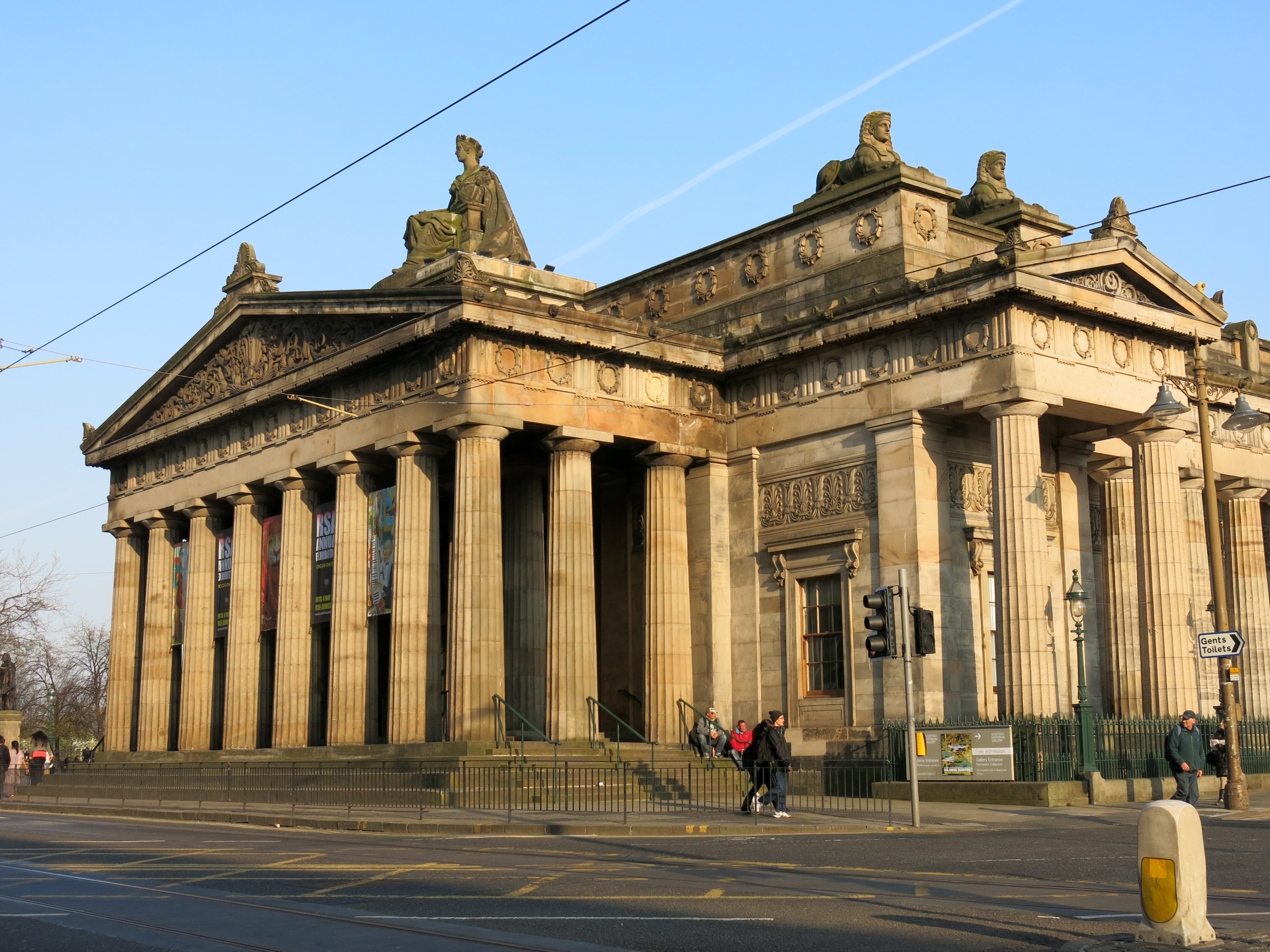
Royal Scottish Academy, Edinburgh, Scotland, by William Henry Playfair, 1822–1826

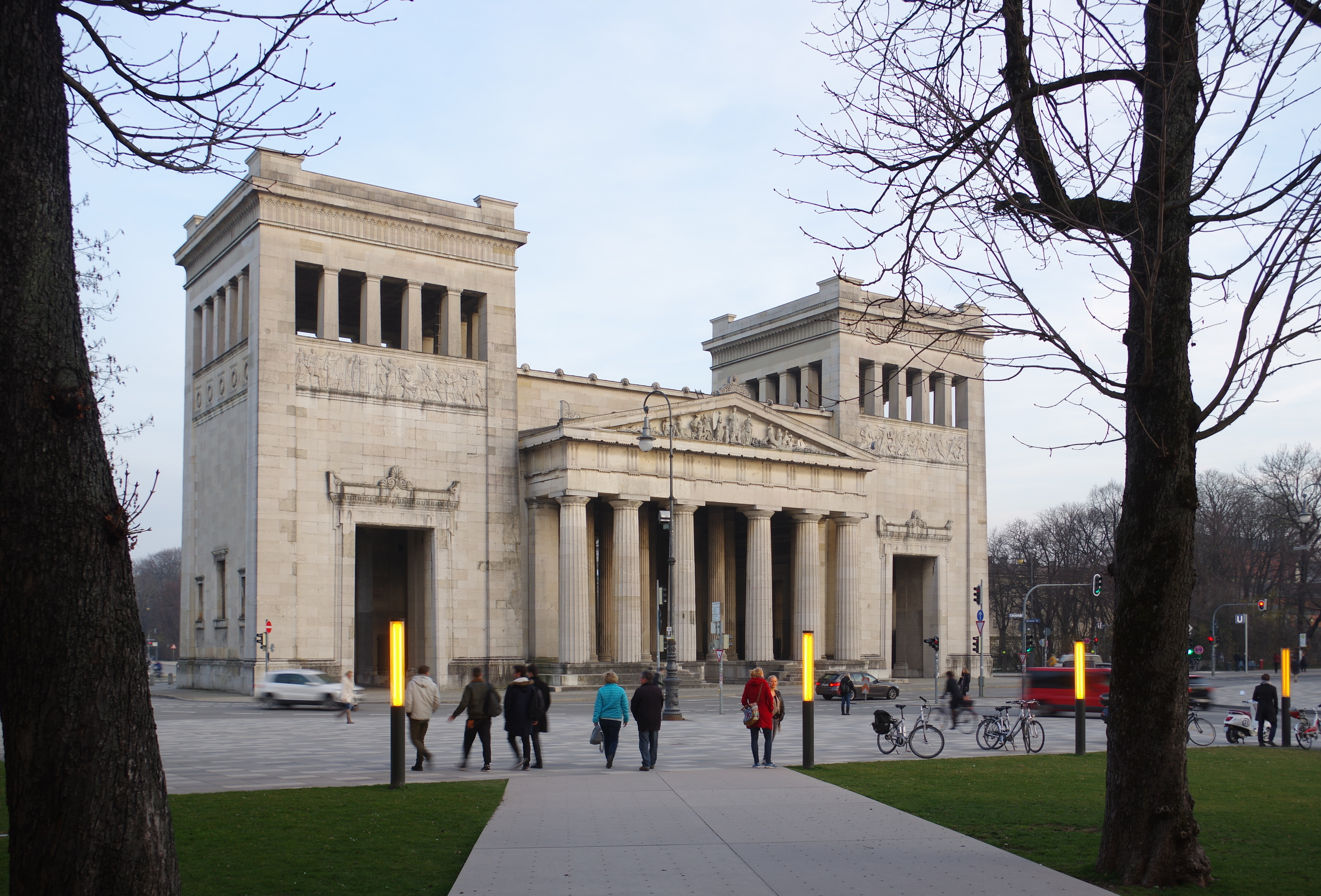
Propylaea (Munich), Germany, by Leo von Klenze, finished in 1862

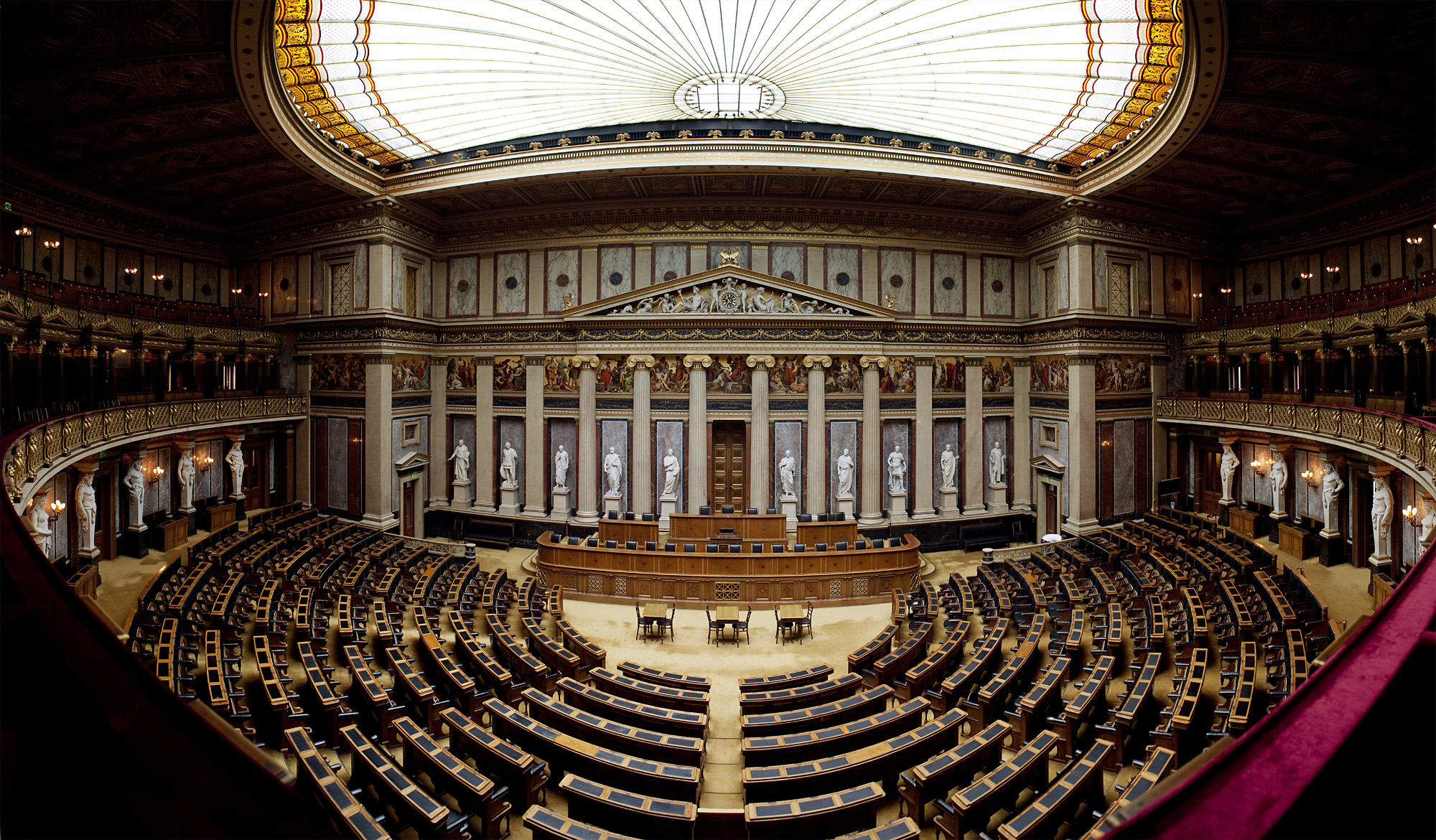
Austrian Parliament Building, Vienna, by Theophil Hansen, 1874–1883

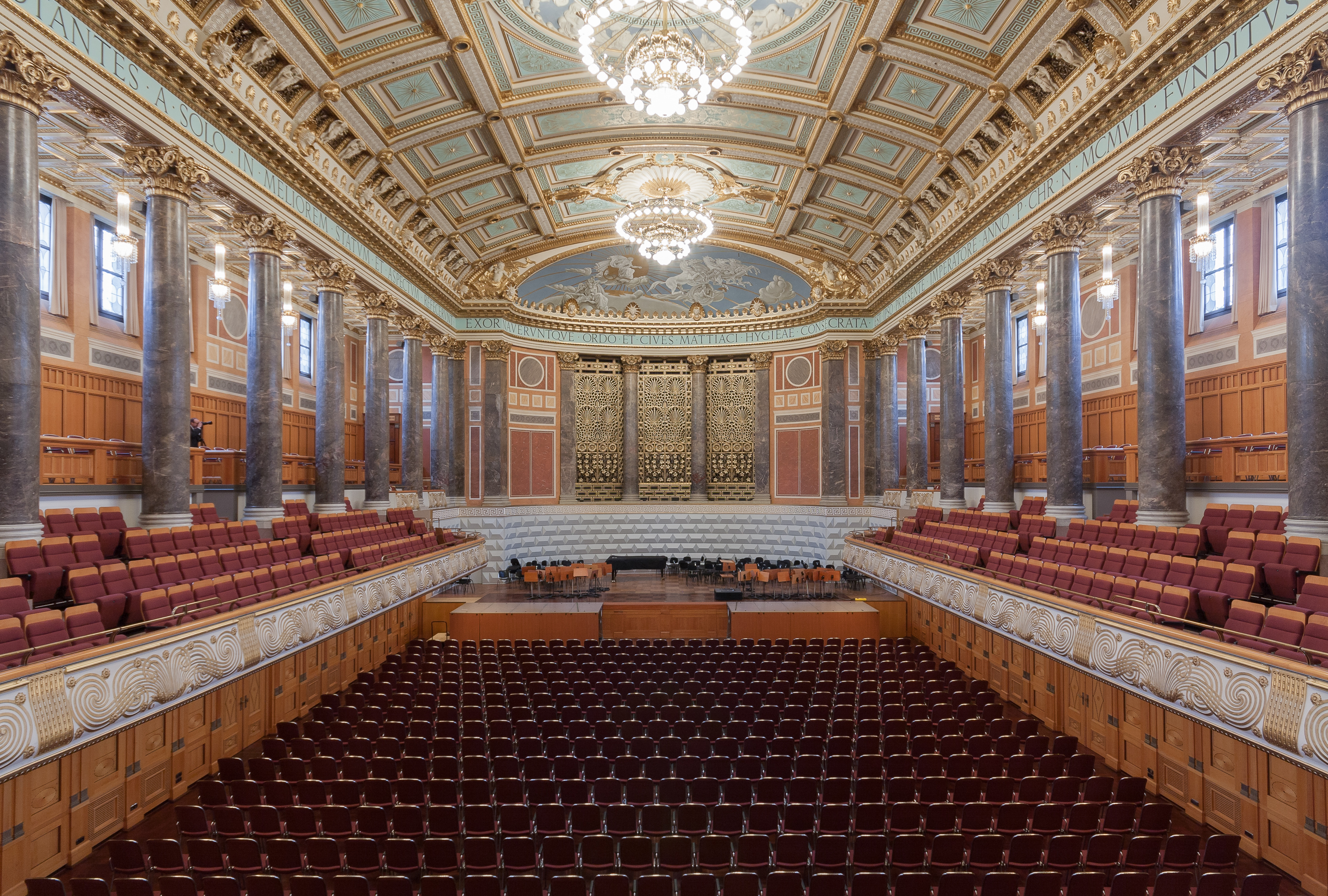
Friedrich-von-Thiersch hall of the Kurhaus, Wiesbaden, Germany, 1905–1907, by Friedrich von Thiersch

== Characteristics ==
The L'Enfant Plan for Washington, D.C., as revised by Andrew Ellicott in 1792.

High neoclassicism was an international movement. Architects reacted against the excesses and profuse ornament used in Late Baroque architecture. The new "classical" architecture emphasized planar qualities, rather than elaborate sculptural ornament in both the interior and the exterior. Projections and recessions and their effects of light and shade were more flat; sculptural bas-reliefs were flat and tended to be framed by friezes, tablets or panels. This was the first "stripped down" classical architecture, and appeared to be modern in the context of the Revolutionary period in Europe. At its most elemental, as in the work of Etienne-Louis Boullée, it was highly abstract and geometrically pure.

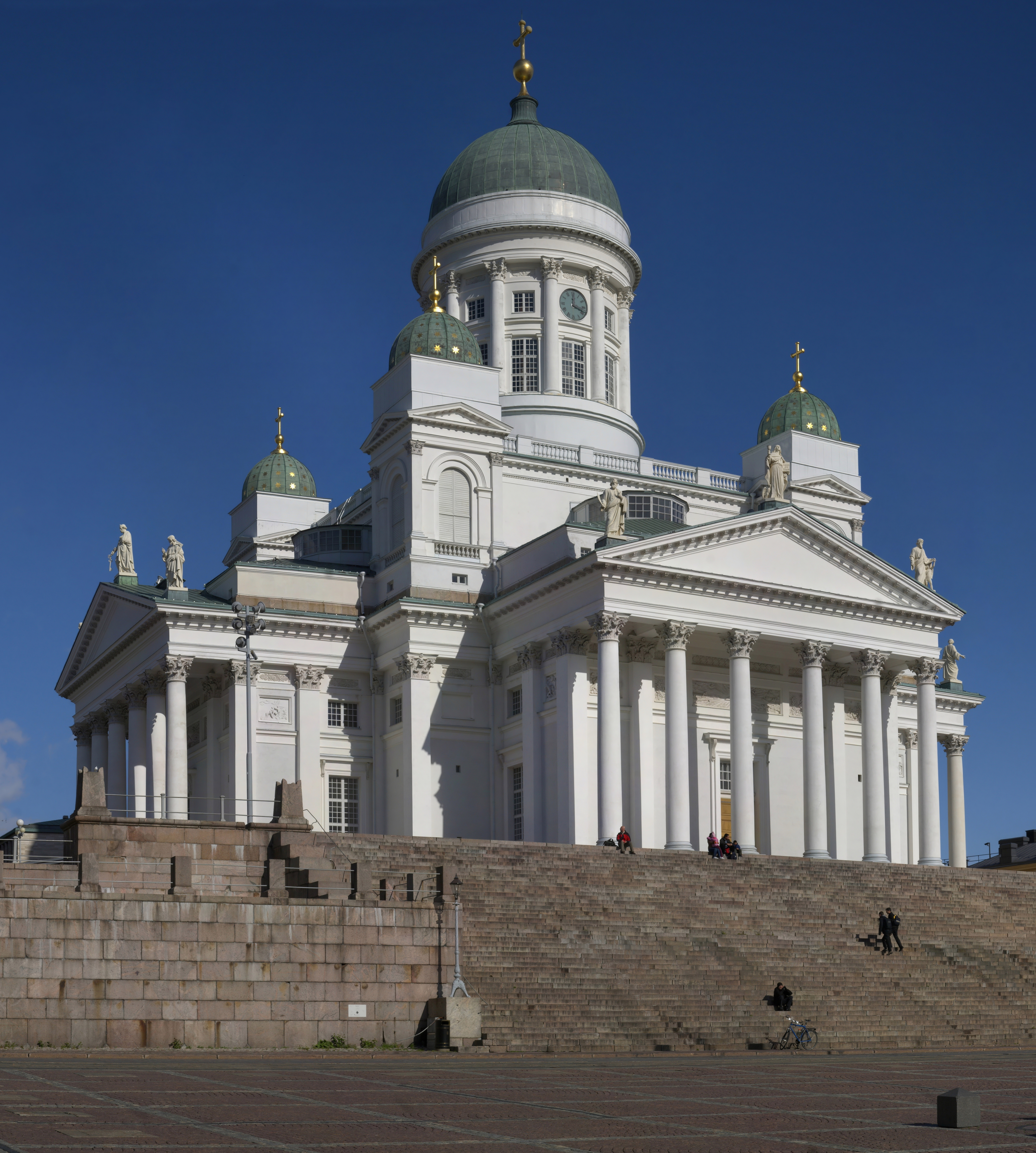
The neoclassical Helsinki Cathedral from the 19th century, near the Senate Square, Helsinki, Finland.

Neoclassicism also influenced city planning. The ancient Romans had used a consolidated scheme for city planning for both defence and civil convenience; however, the roots of this scheme go back to even older civilizations. At its most basic, the grid system of streets, a central forum with city services, two main slightly wider boulevards, and the occasional diagonal street were characteristic of the very logical and orderly Roman design. Ancient façades and building layouts were oriented to these city design patterns and they tended to work in proportion with the importance of public buildings.

Many of these urban planning patterns found their way into the first modern planned cities of the 18th century. Exceptional examples include Karlsruhe, Washington, D.C., Saint Petersburg, Buenos Aires, Havana, and Barcelona. Contrasting models may be found in Modernist designs exemplified by Brasília, the Garden city movement, and levittowns.

== Regional trends ==
=== France ===
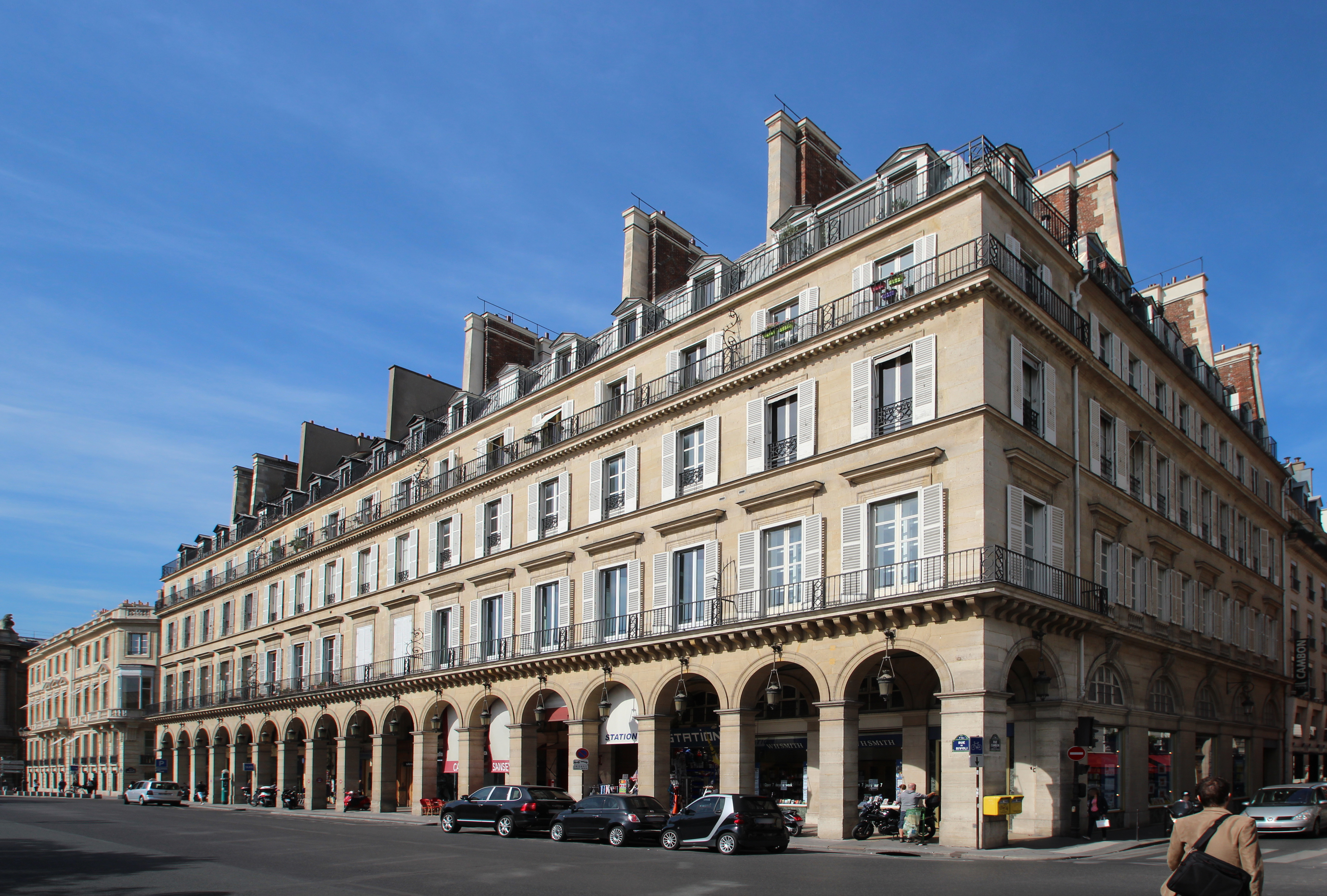
Parisian apartment building on Rue de Rivoli. The name of the street comes from Napoleon's victory over the Austrians at the Battle of Rivoli (1797)

The first phase of neoclassicism in France is expressed in the Louis XV style of architect Ange-Jacques Gabriel (Petit Trianon, 1762–1768); the second phase, in the styles called Directoire and Empire, might be characterized by Jean-François Chalgrin's severe astylar Arc de Triomphe (designed in 1806). In England the two phases might be characterized first by the structures of Robert Adam, the second by those of Sir John Soane. The interior style in France was initially a Parisian style, the "Goût grec" ("Greek style") not a court style. Only when the young King Louis XVI acceded to the throne in 1774 did Marie Antoinette, his fashion-loving Queen, bring the Louis XVI style to court.

Many early 19th-century neoclassical architects were influenced by the drawings and projects of Étienne-Louis Boullée and Claude Nicolas Ledoux. The many graphite drawings of Boullée and his students depict spare geometrical architecture that emulates the eternality of the universe. There are links between Boullée's ideas and Edmund Burke's conception of the sublime. Ledoux addressed the concept of architectural character, maintaining that a building should immediately communicate its function to the viewer: taken literally, such ideas give rise to architecture parlante ("speaking architecture").

From about 1800 a fresh influx of Greek architectural examples, seen through the medium of etchings and engravings, gave a new impetus to neoclassicism that is called the Greek Revival. Although several European cities – notably Saint Petersburg, Athens, Berlin and Munich – were transformed into veritable museums of Greek revival architecture, the Greek Revival in France was never popular with either the state or the public.

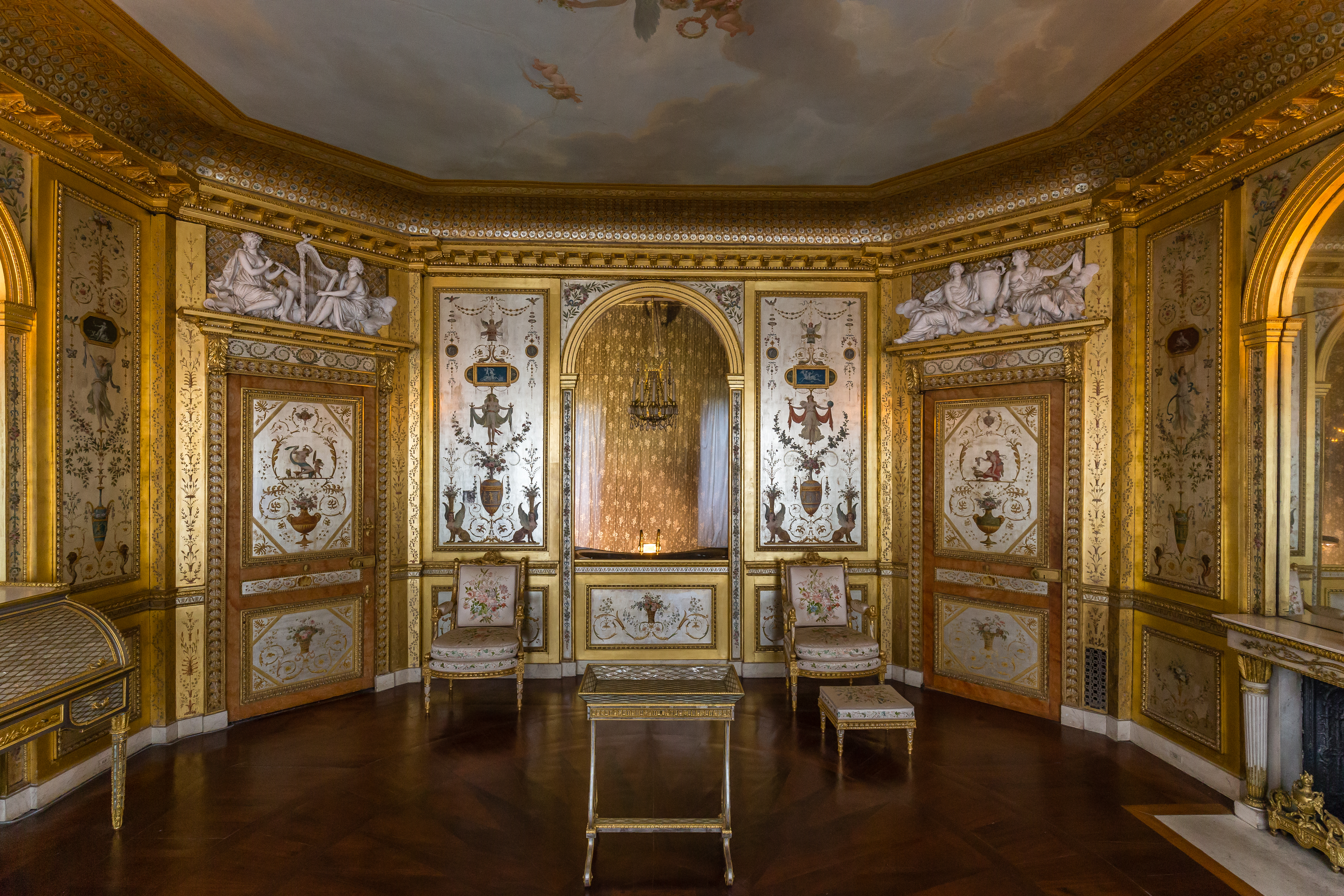
Boudoir de la Reine of the Palace of Fontainebleau (Fontainbleau)

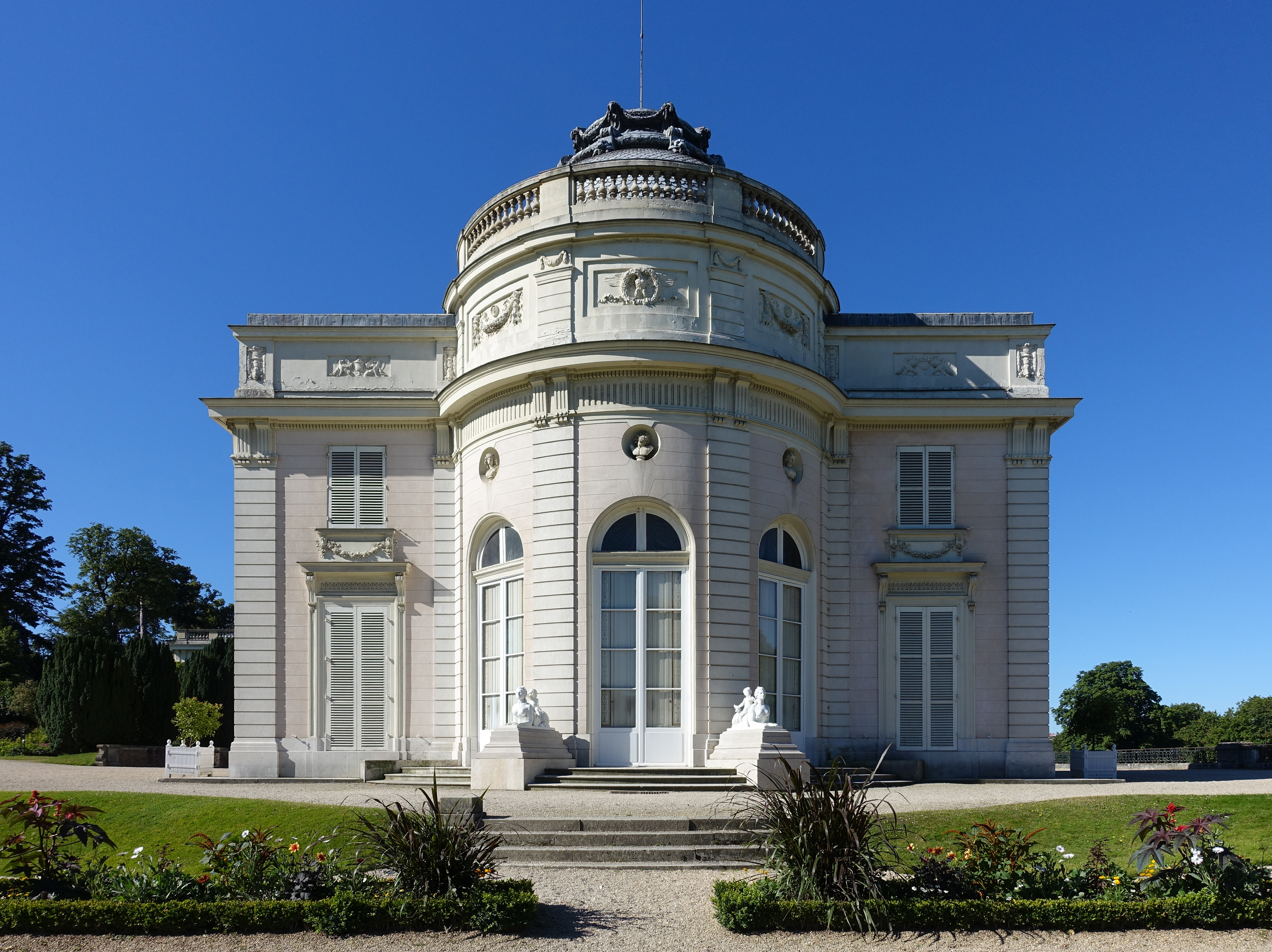
Château de Bagatelle (Paris), a small Neoclassical château, 1777, by François-Joseph Bélanger

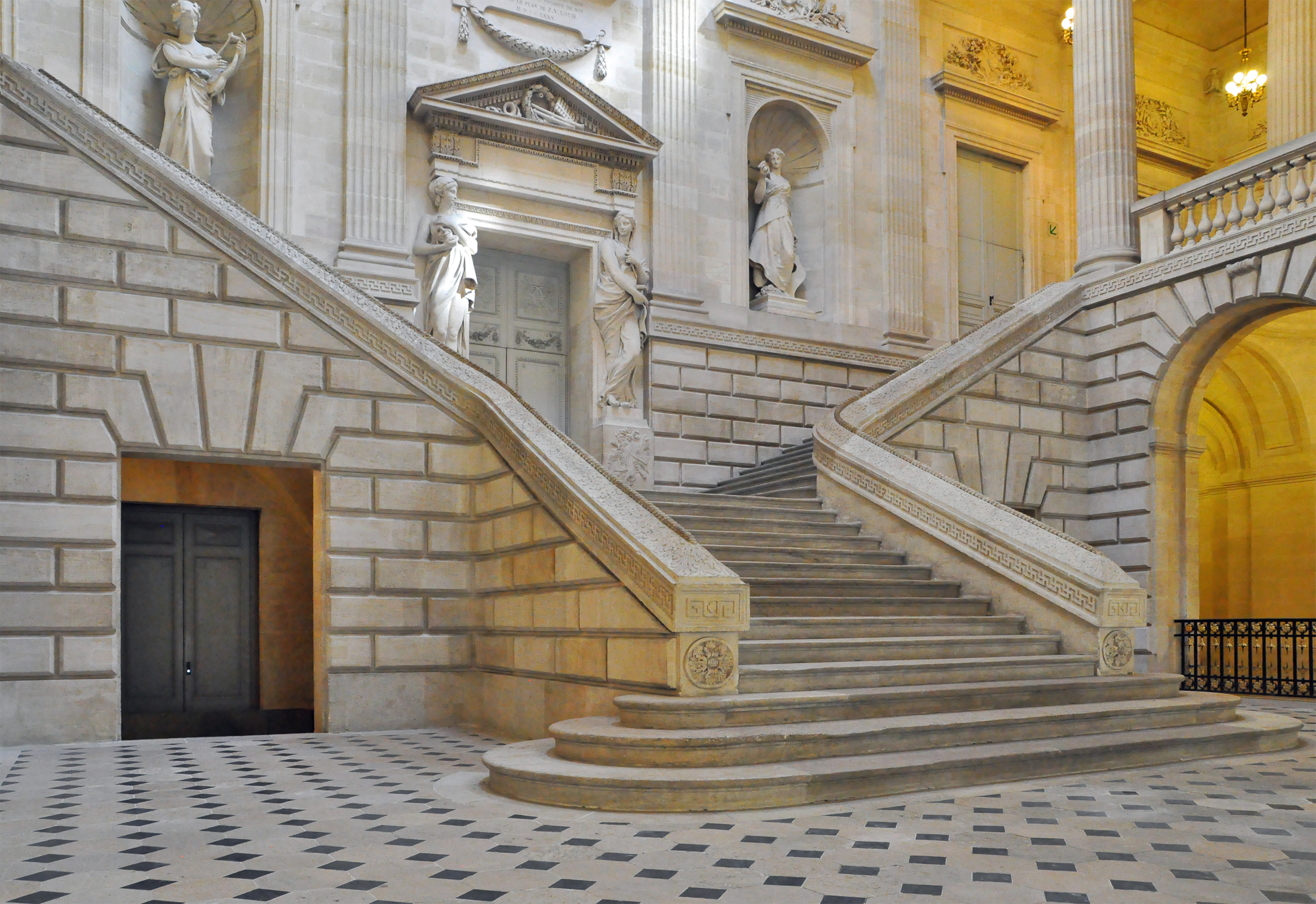
Stairway of the Grand Theater of Bordeaux, 1780, by Victor Louis

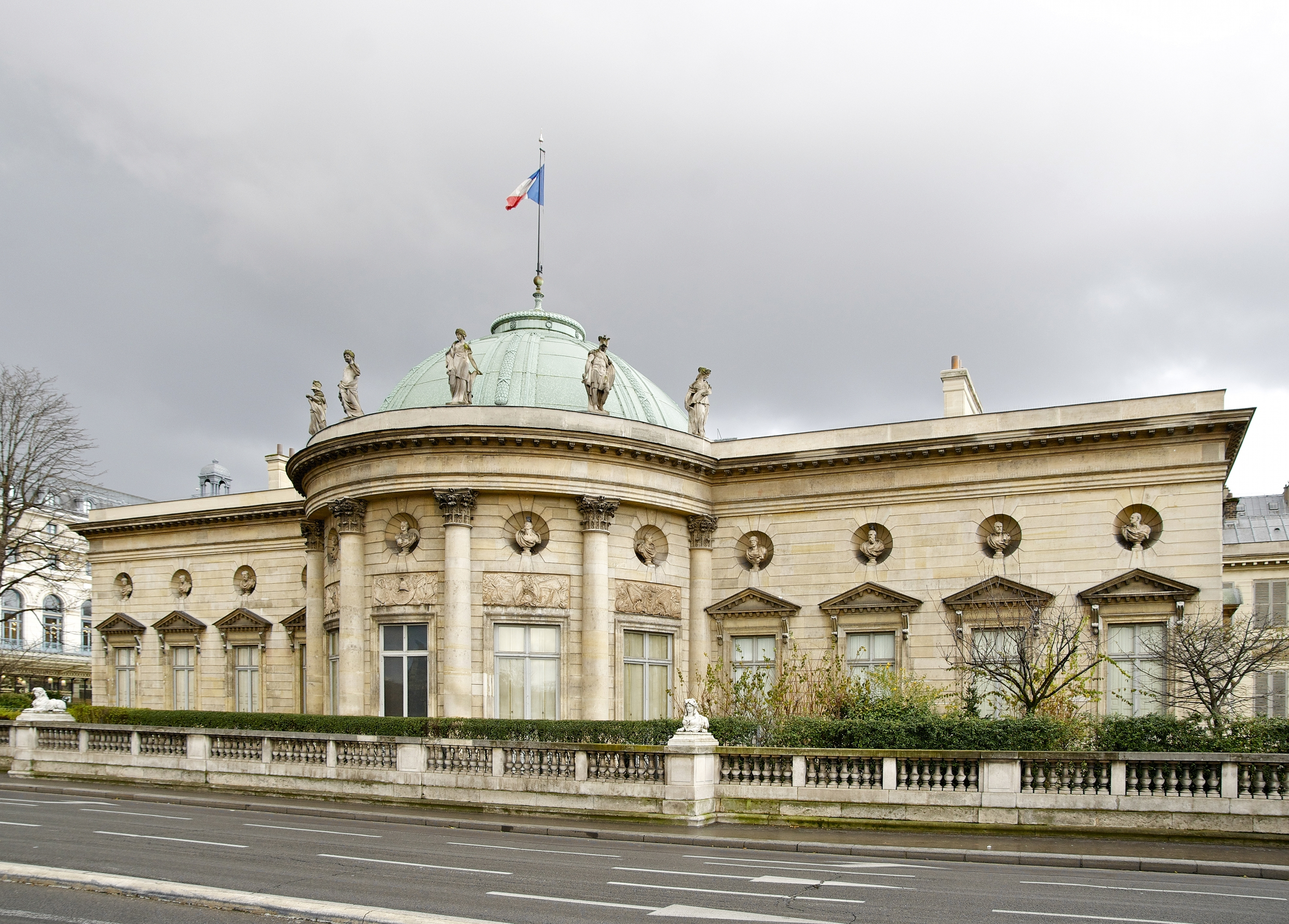
The Palais de la Légion d'Honneur (Paris), 1782–1787, by Pierre Rousseau

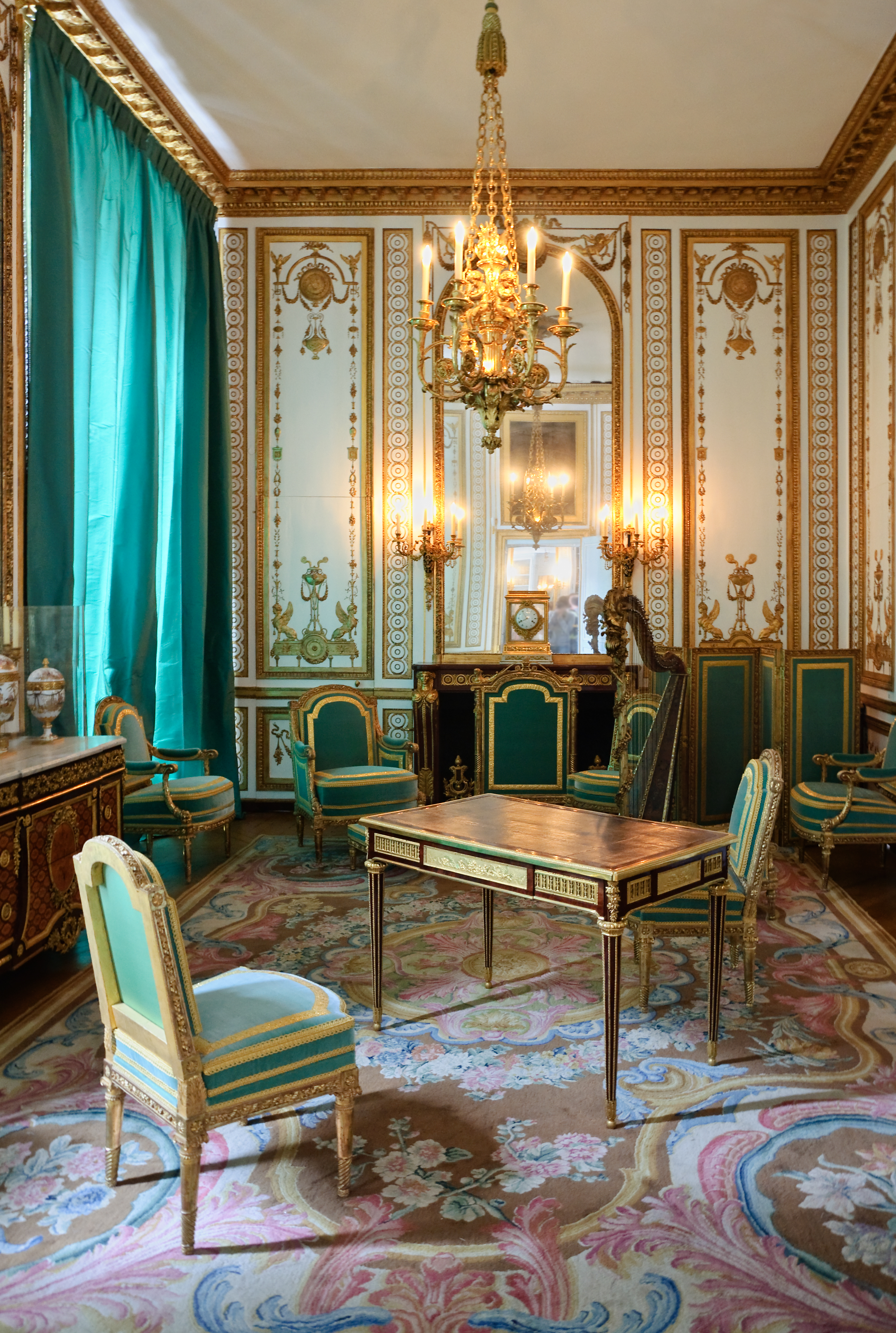
Cabinet doré of Marie Antoinette at the Palace of Versailles (1783)

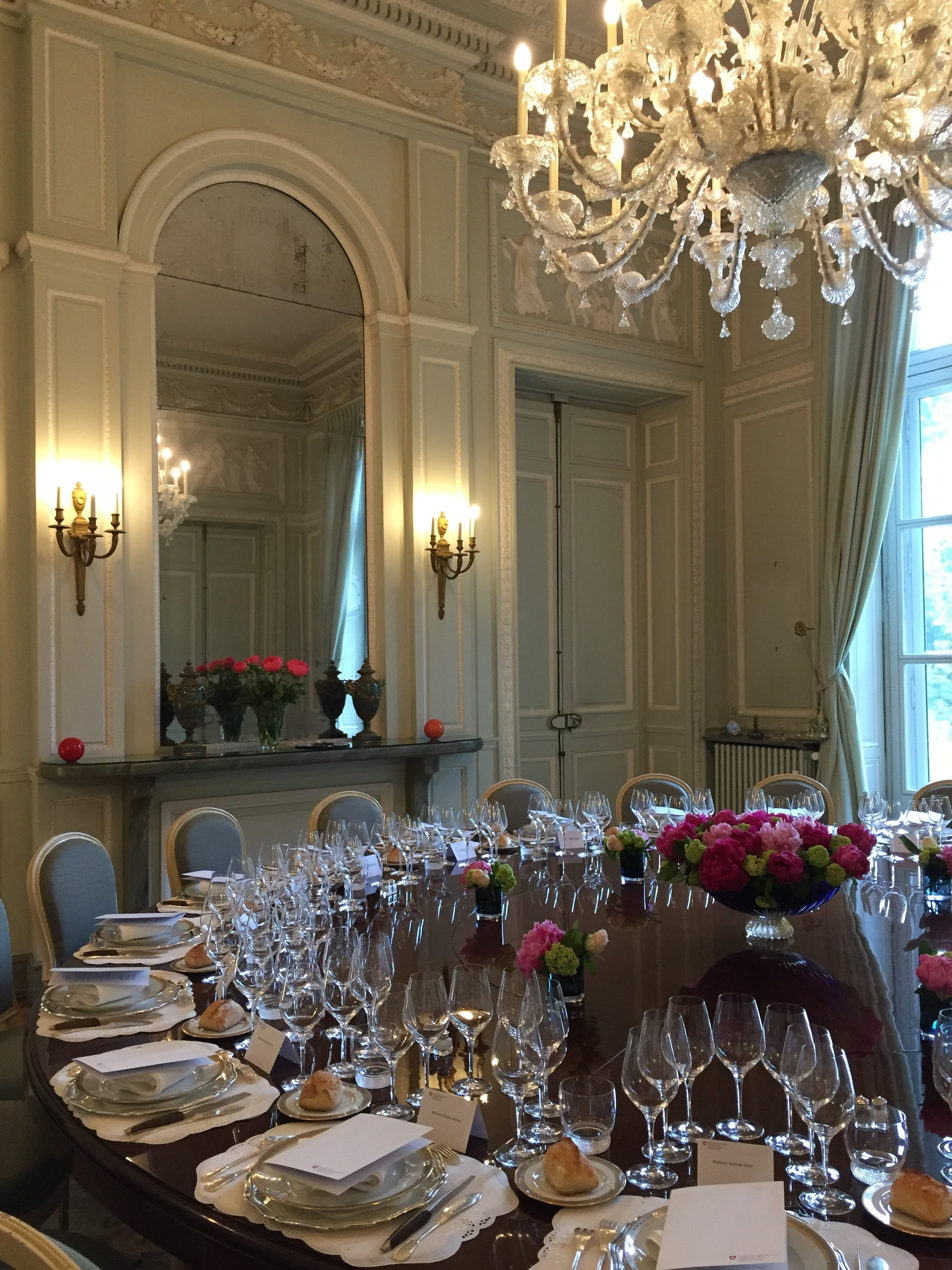
The neoclassical dining room at the Hôtel de Besenval, designed by the architect Alexandre-Théodore Brongniart in 1782

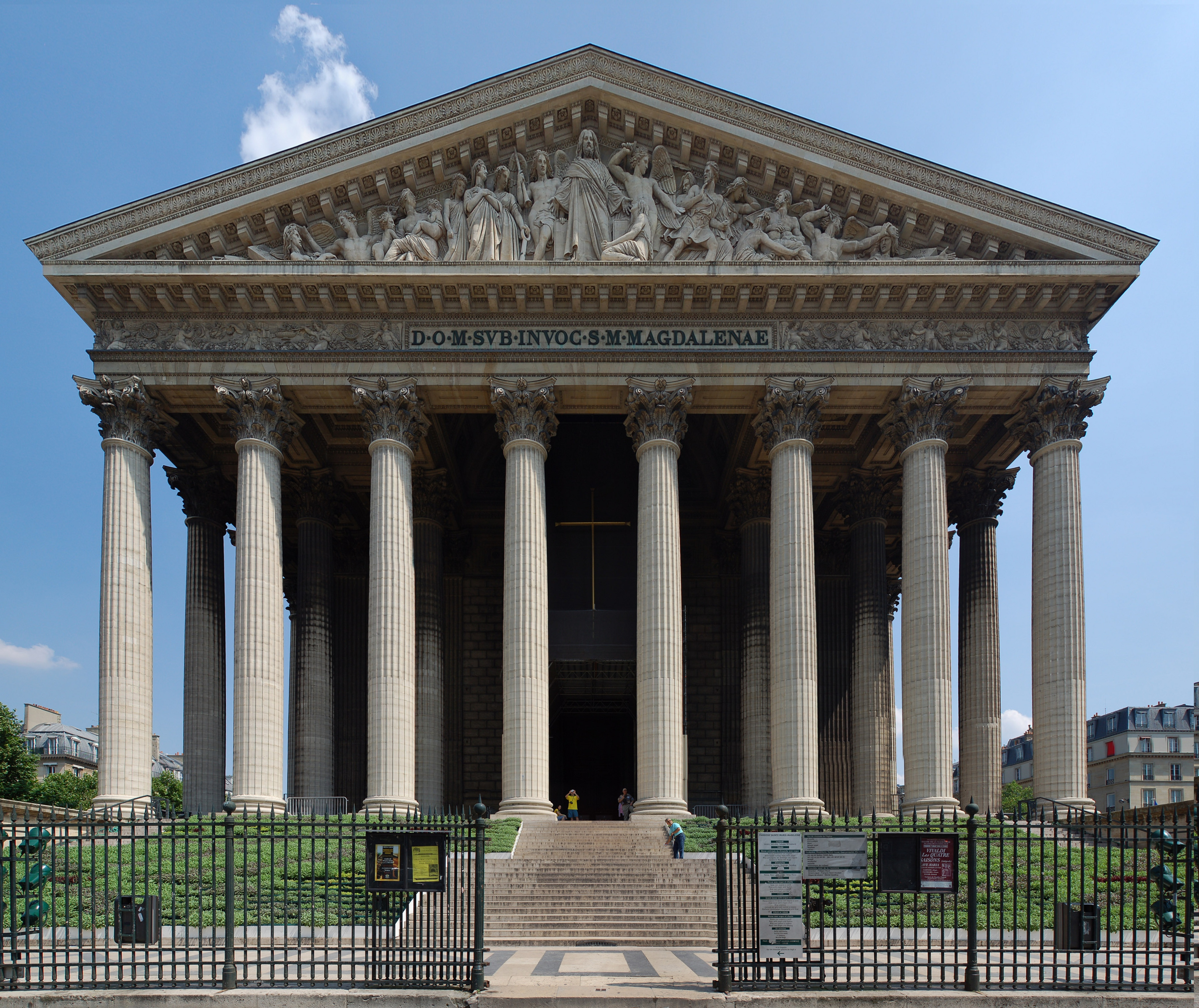
Église de la Madeleine (Paris), 1807–1828, by Pierre-Alexandre Vignon

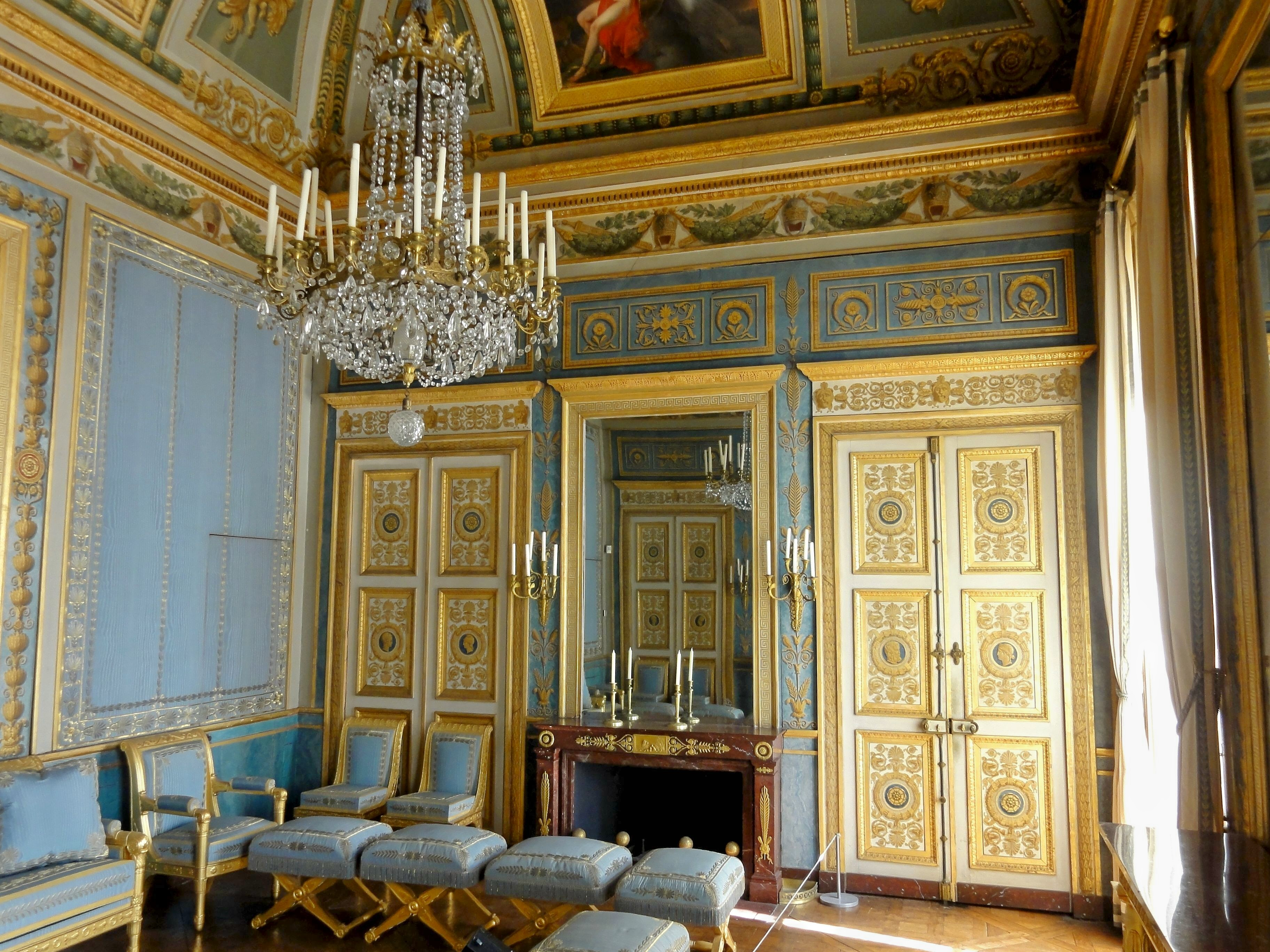
The Blue Salon of the Château de Compiègne (Compiègne), an example of an Empire interior

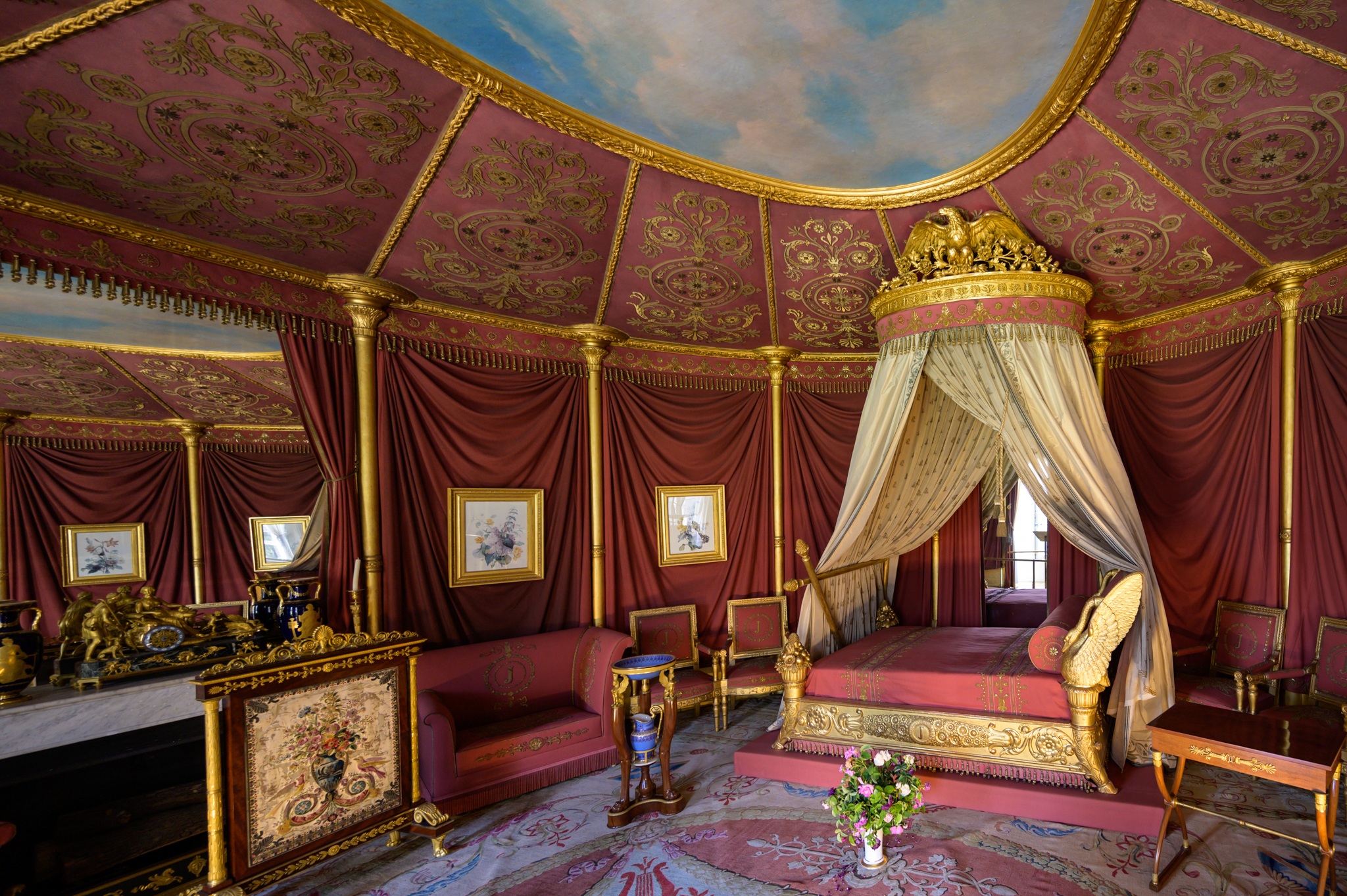
Empress's bedroom from the Château de Malmaison, another Empire interior

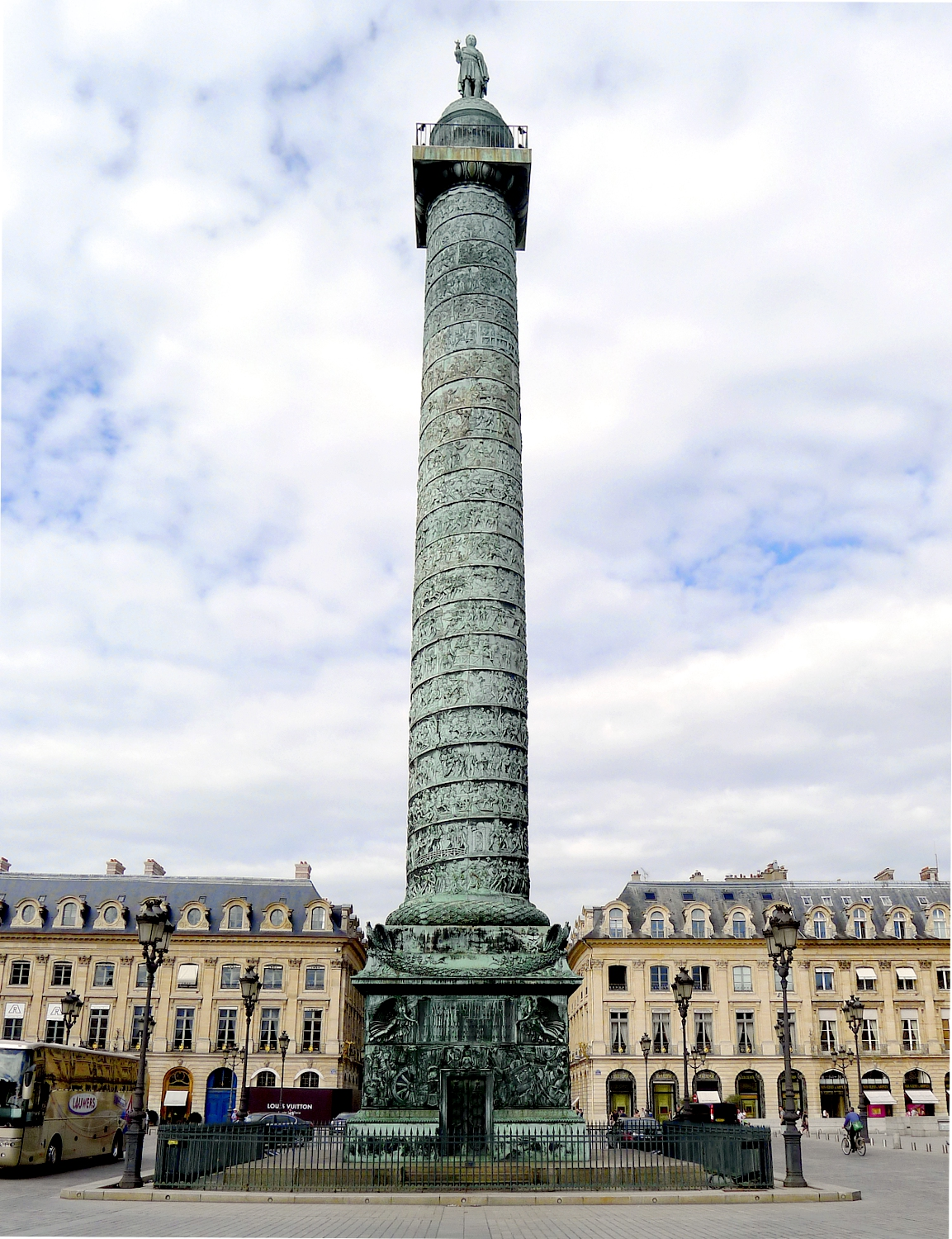
The Vendôme Column (Paris), modelled after Trajan's Column, 1810

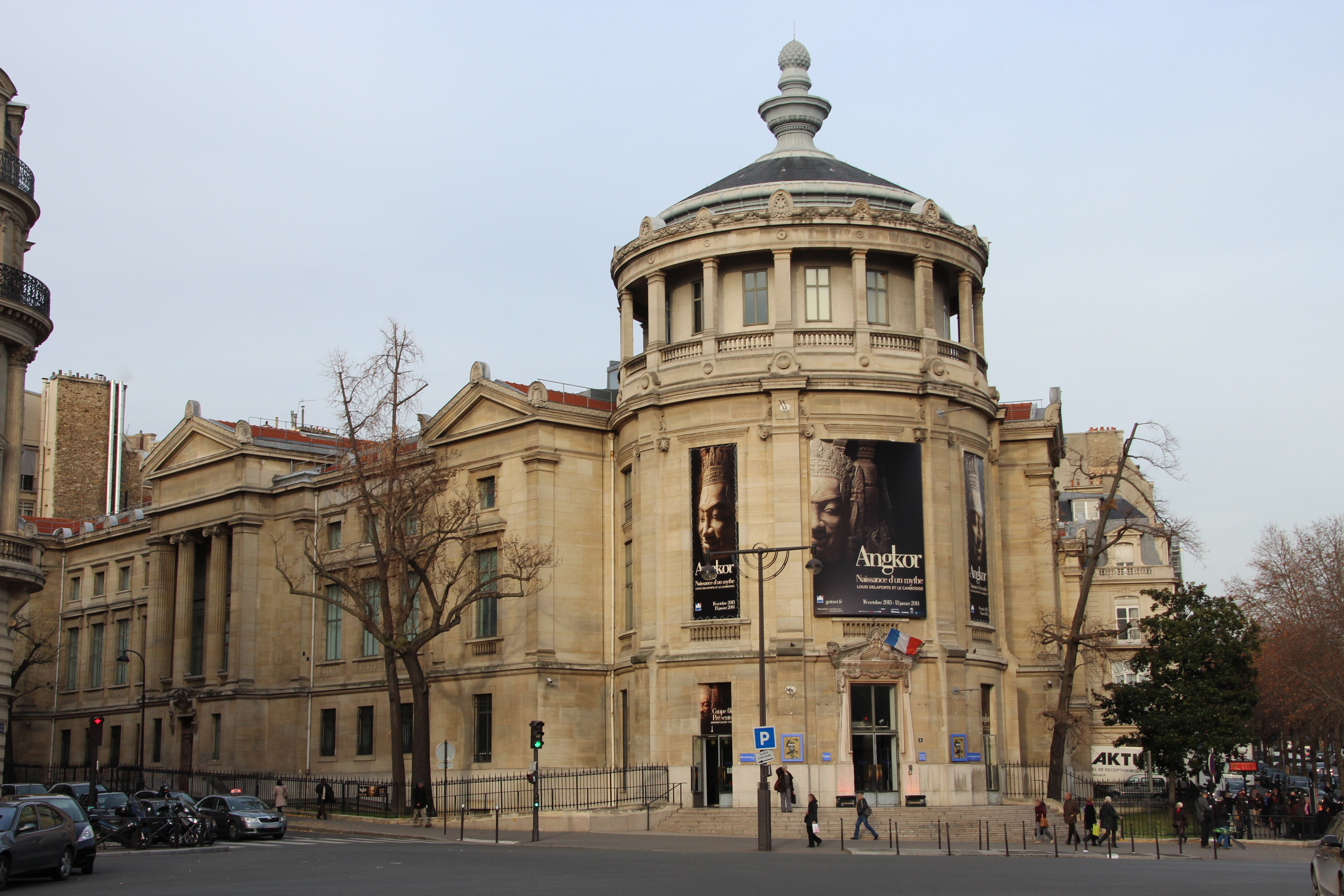
The Guimet Museum (Paris), by Jules Chatron

=== Germany ===
Neoclassical architecture became a symbol of national pride during the 18th century in Germany, in what was then Prussia. Karl Friedrich Schinkel built many notable buildings in this style, including the Altes Museum in Berlin. While the city remained dominated by Baroque city planning, his architecture and functional style provided the city with a distinctly neoclassical center.

Schinkel's work is very comparable to Neoclassical architecture in Britain since he drew much of his inspiration from that country. He made trips to observe the buildings and develop his functional style.

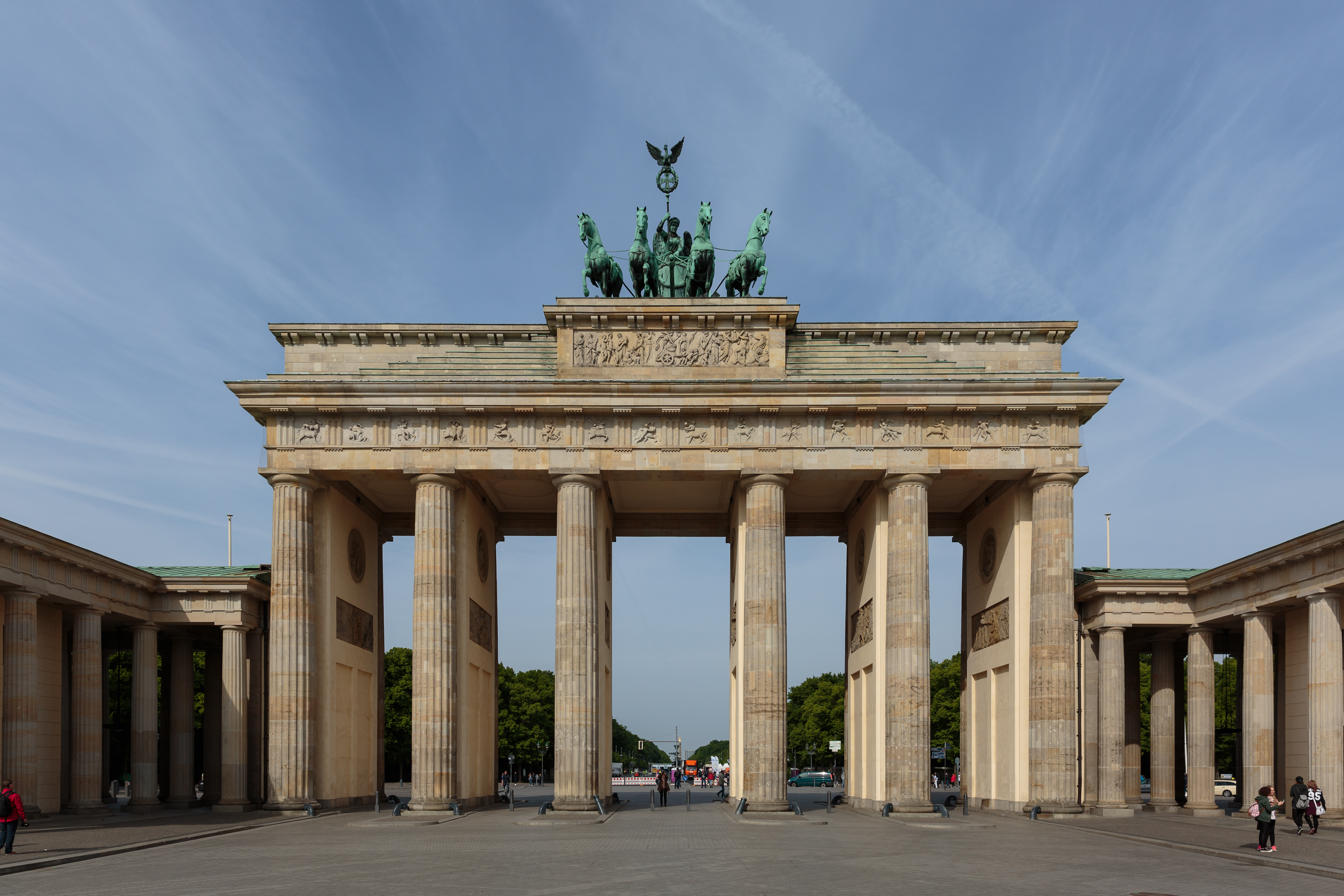
Brandenburg Gate in Berlin (1788–1791) by Carl Gotthard Langhans

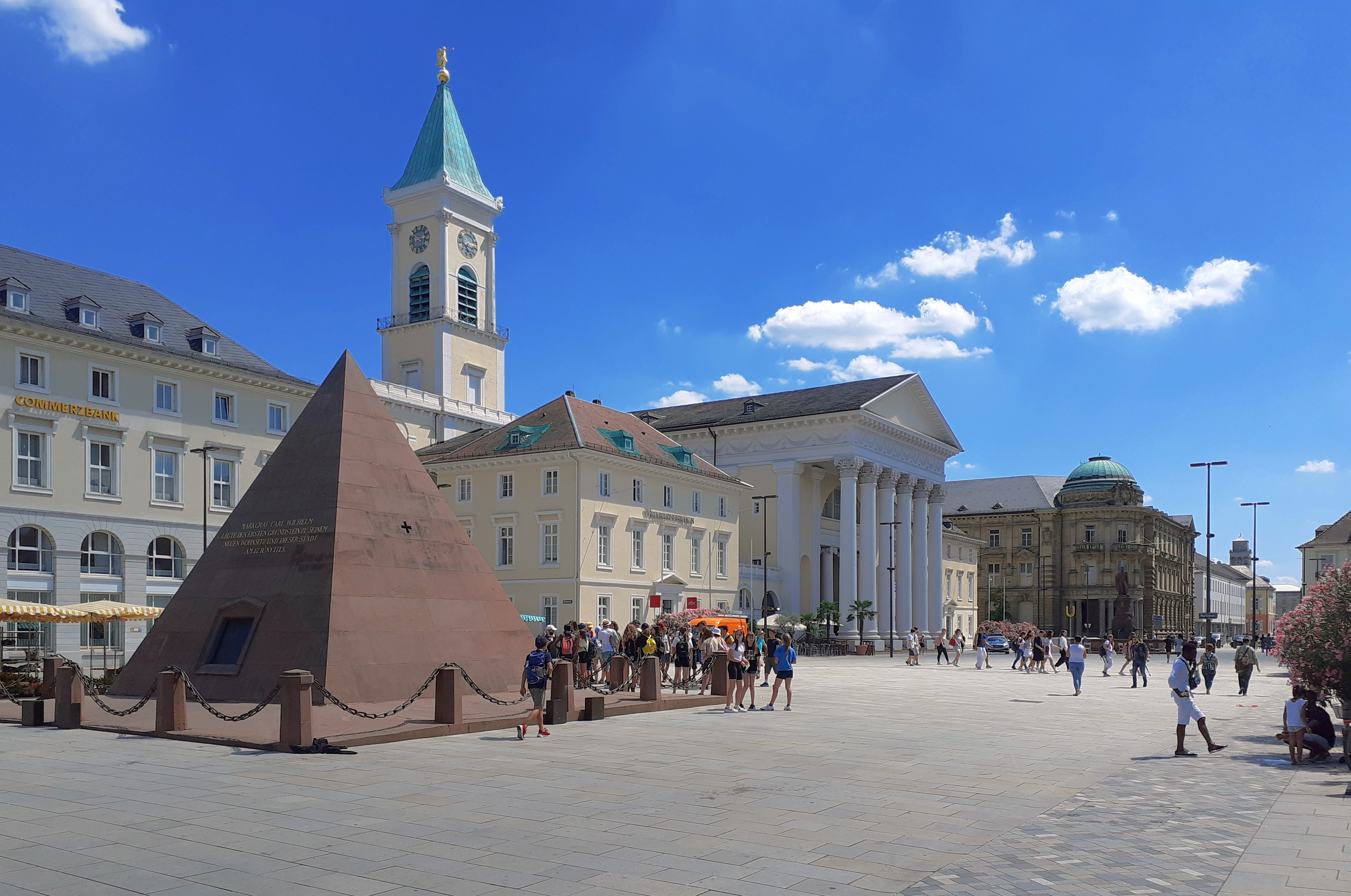
Karlsruhe Pyramid (1823–1825) and City Church (1807–1816) in Karlsruhe, by Friedrich Weinbrenner

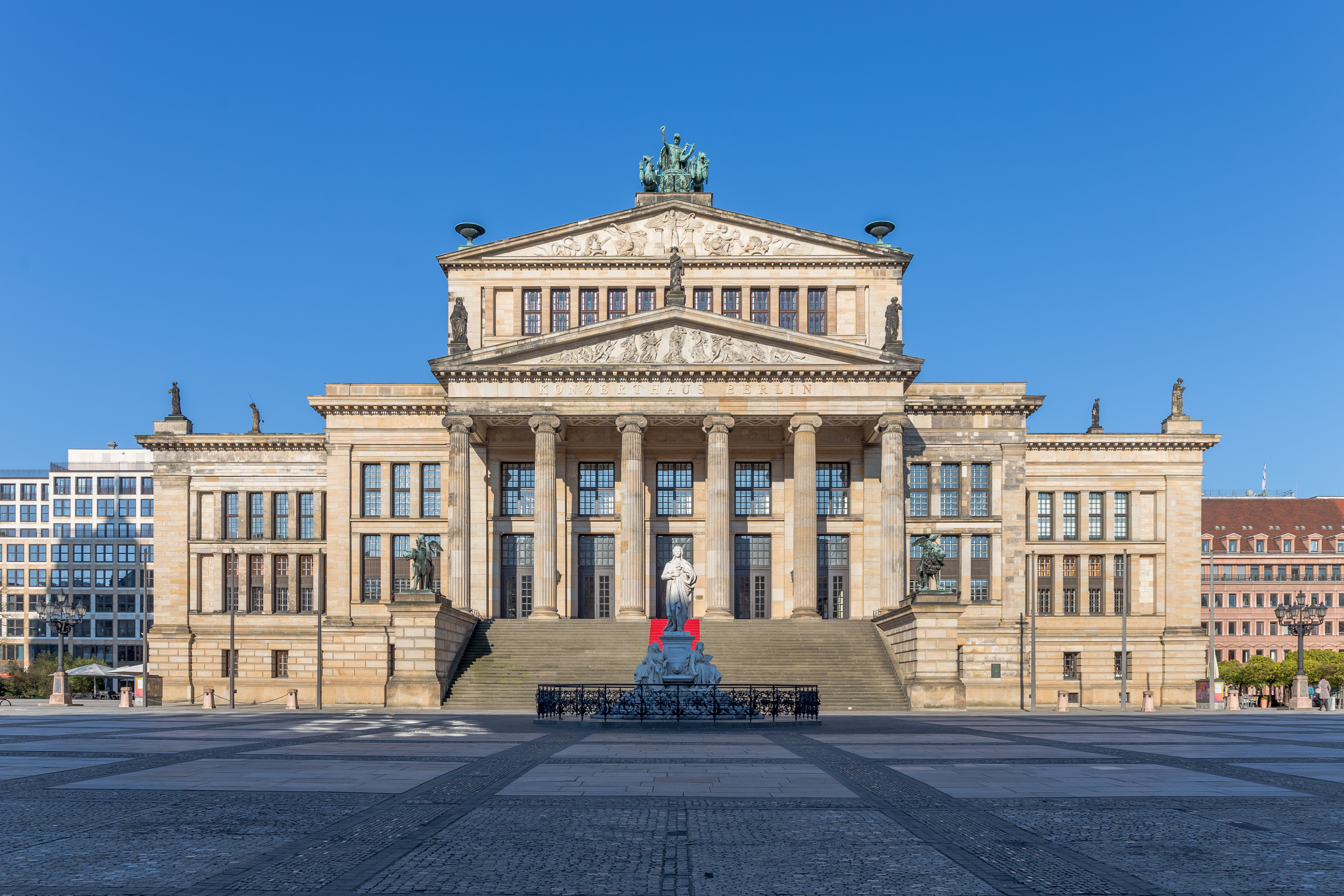
Konzerthaus Berlin in Berlin (1818–1821) by Karl Friedrich Schinkel

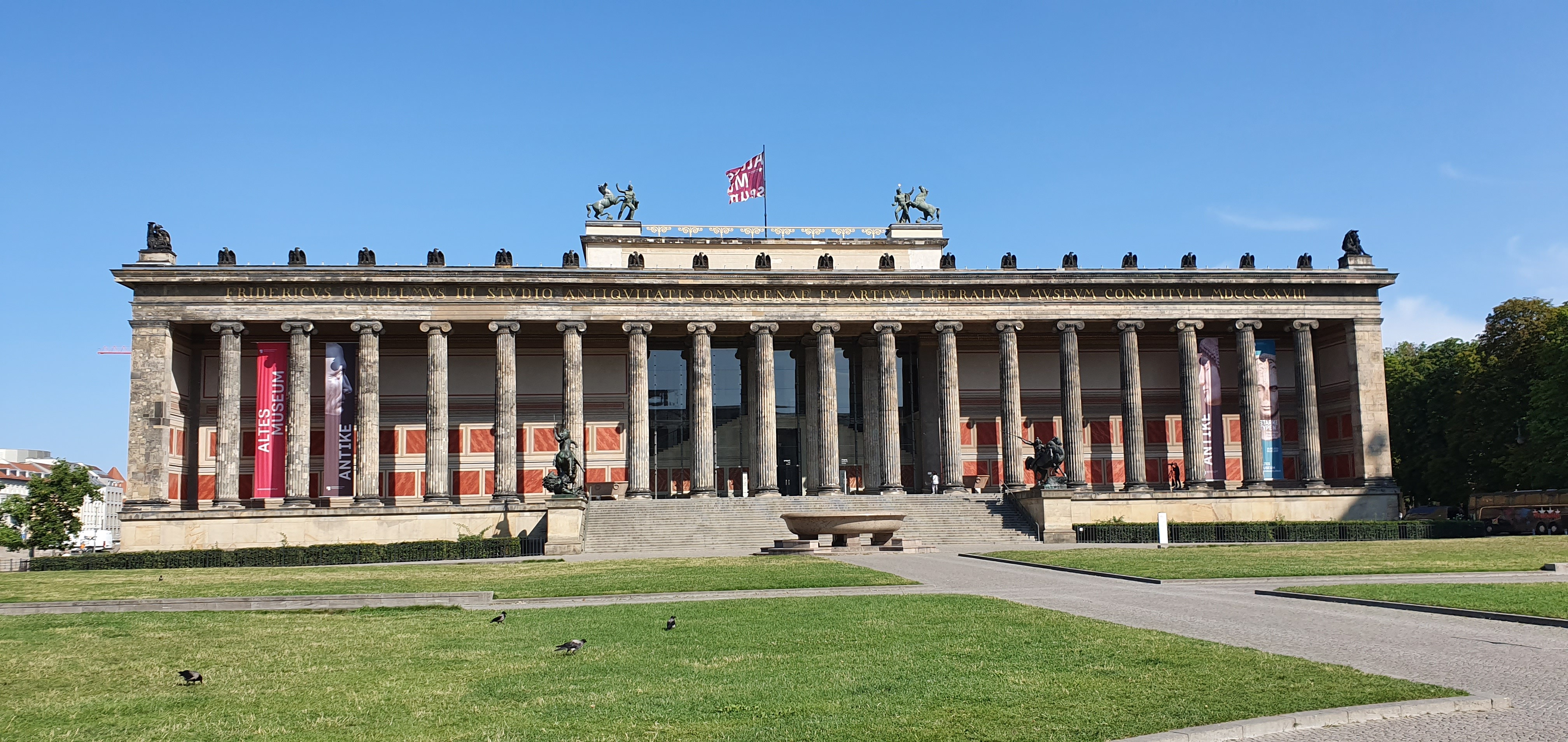
Altes Museum in Berlin (1825–1830) by Karl Friedrich Schinkel

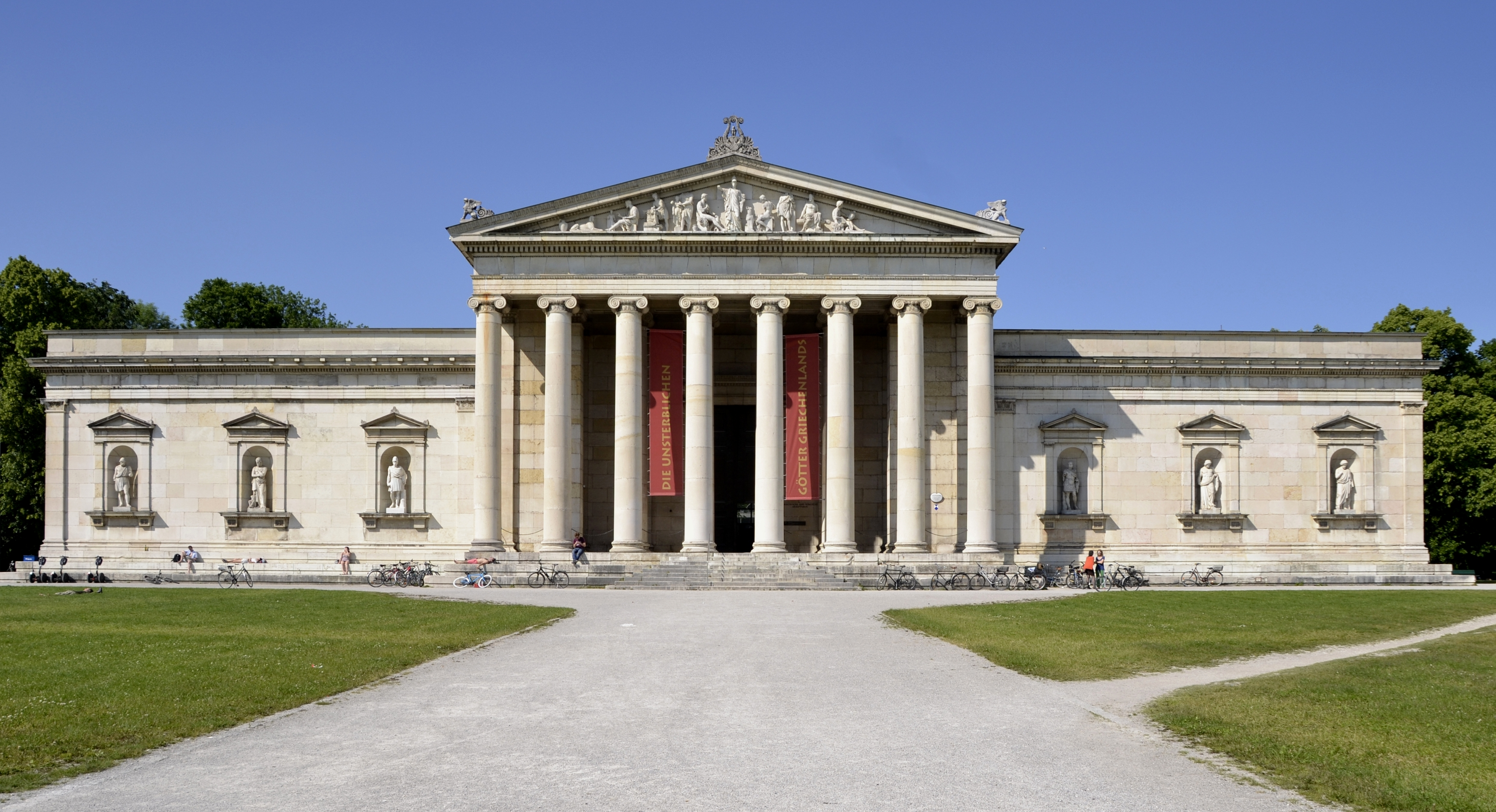
Glyptothek in Munich (1816–1830) by Leo von Klenze

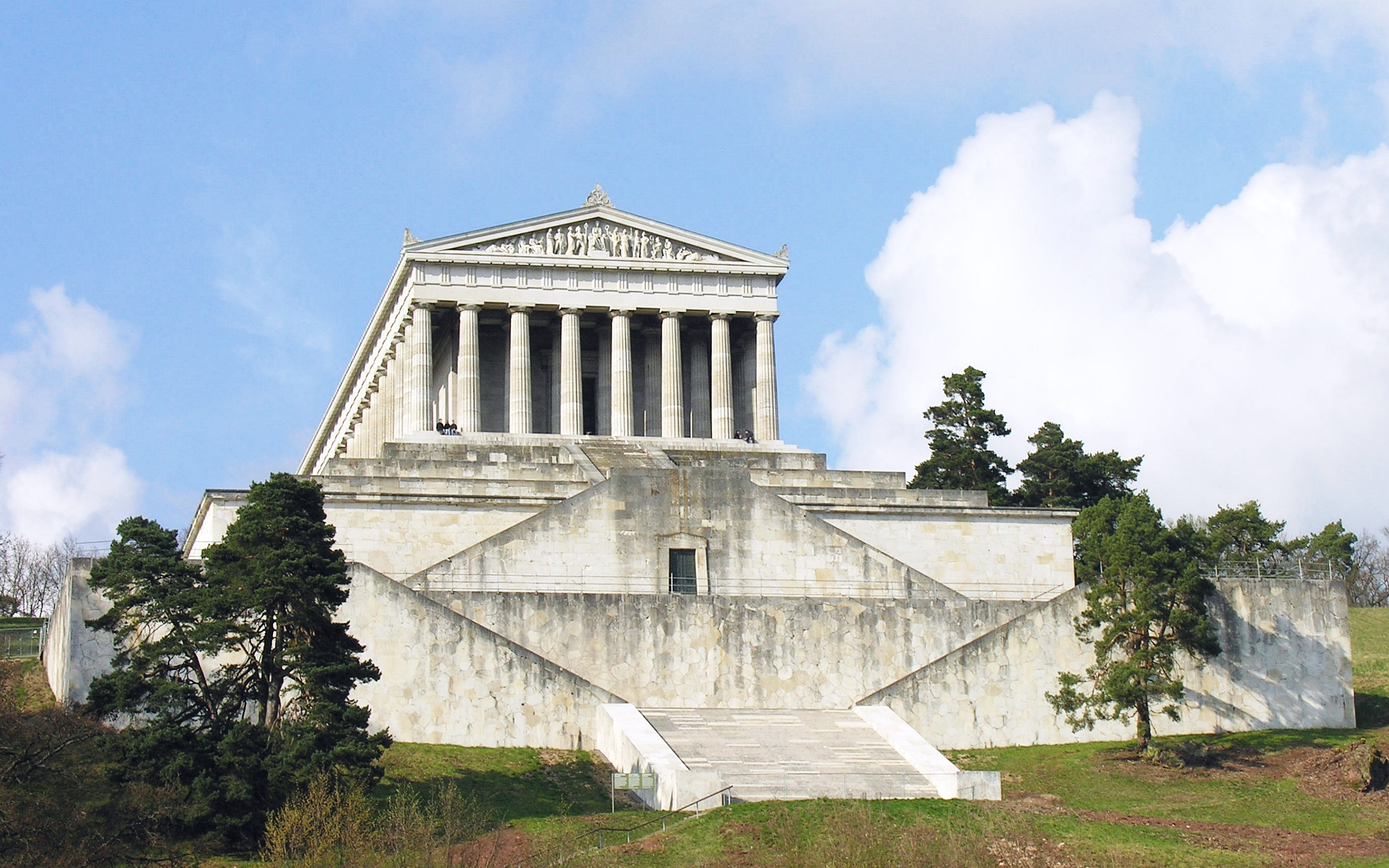
Walhalla (1830–1842) by Leo von Klenze

Staatliche Antikensammlungen (1848) by Georg Friedrich Ziebland

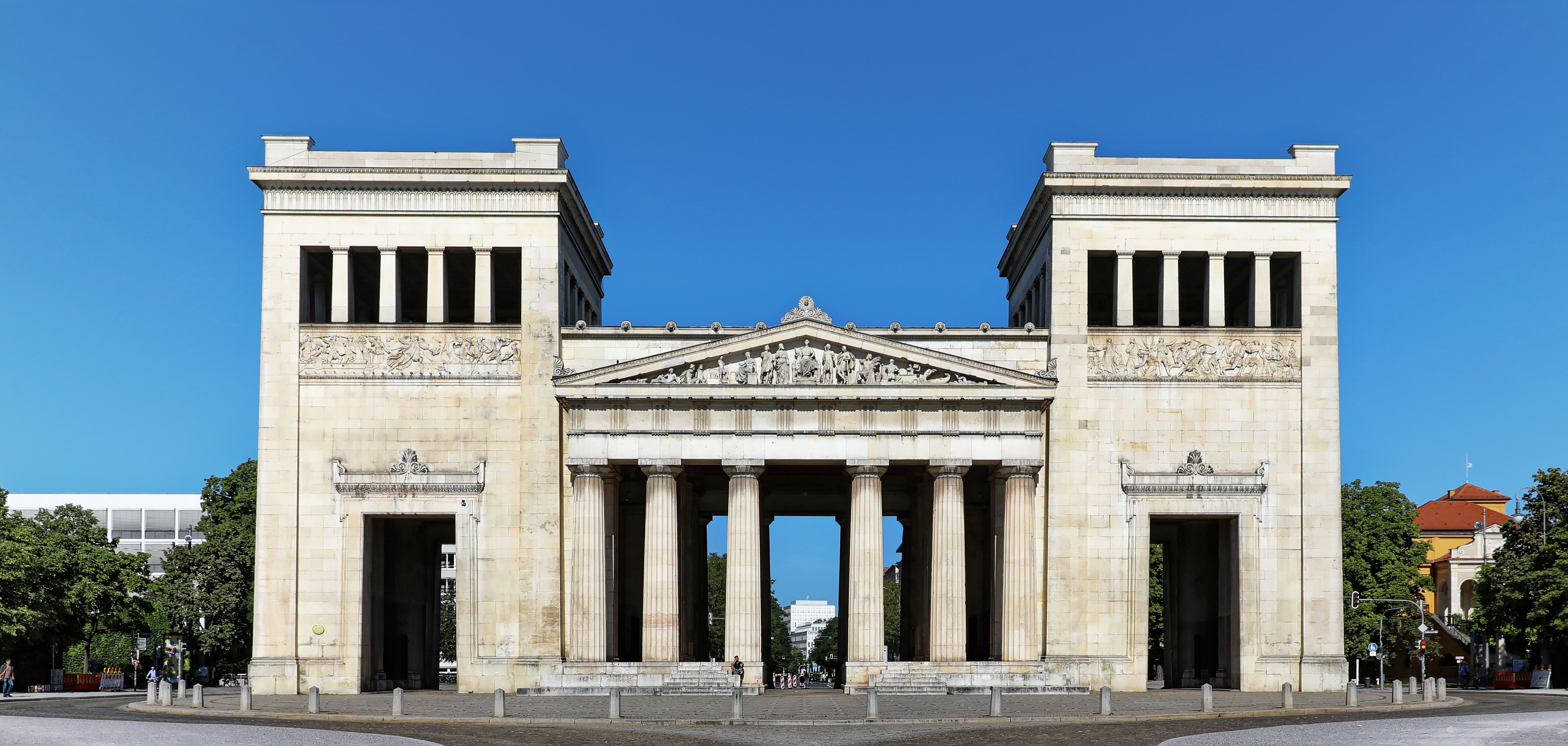
Propylaea in Munich (1854–1862) by Leo von Klenze

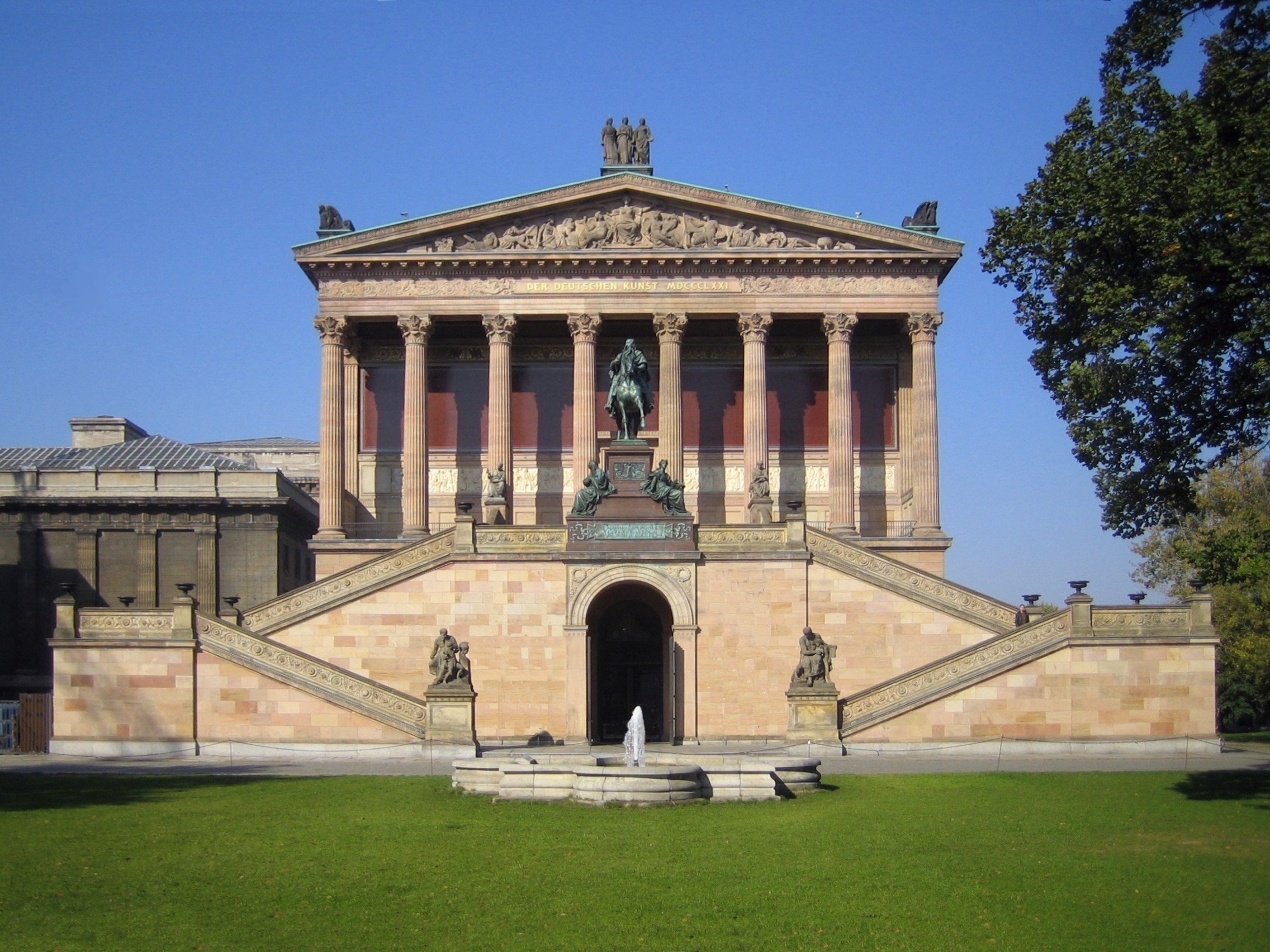
Alte Nationalgalerie in Berlin (1862–1876) by Friedrich August Stüler and Heinrich Strack

=== Great Britain and Ireland ===
From the middle of the 18th century, exploration and publication changed the course of British architecture from the Palladian architecture towards a purer vision of the Ancient Greco-Roman ideal. James 'Athenian' Stuart's work The Antiquities of Athens and Other Monuments of Greece was very influential in this regard, as were Robert Wood's Palmyra and Baalbec. A combination of simple forms and high levels of enrichment was adopted by the majority of contemporary British architects and designers. The revolution begun by Stuart was soon to be eclipsed by the work of the Adam brothers, James Wyatt, Sir William Chambers, George Dance the Younger, James Gandon, and provincially based architects such as John Carr and Thomas Harrison of Chester.

In Scotland and the north of England, where the Gothic Revival was less strong, architects continued to develop the neoclassical style of William Henry Playfair. The works of Cuthbert Brodrick and Alexander Thomson show that by the end of the 19th century the results could be powerful and eccentric.

In Ireland, where Gothic Revival was also less popular, a refined, restrained form of the neoclassical developed, and can be seen in the works of James Gandon and other architects working at the time. It is particularly evident in Dublin, which is a largely neoclassical and Georgian city.

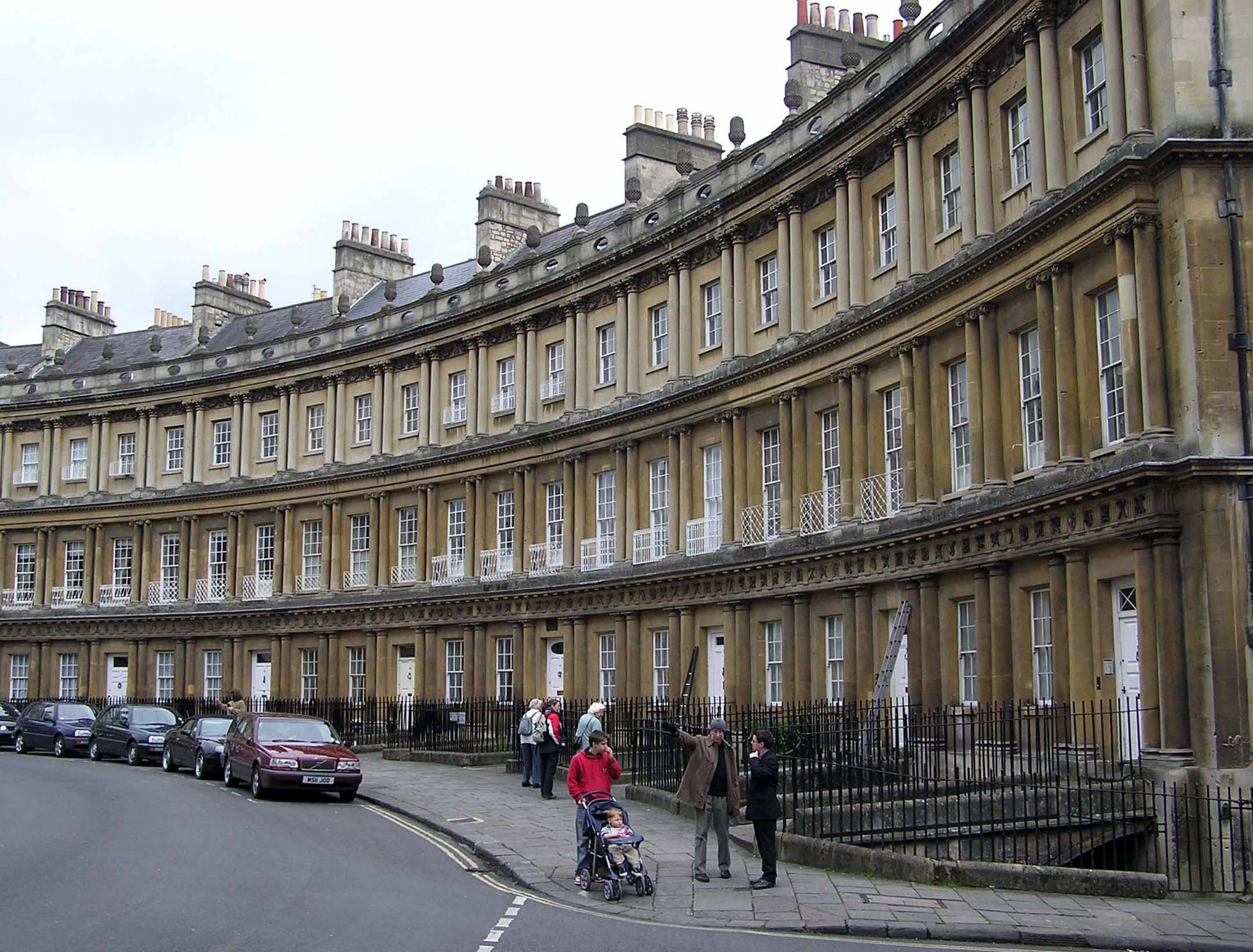
The Circus, Bath, Somerset, England, 1754–1768, by John Wood, the Elder

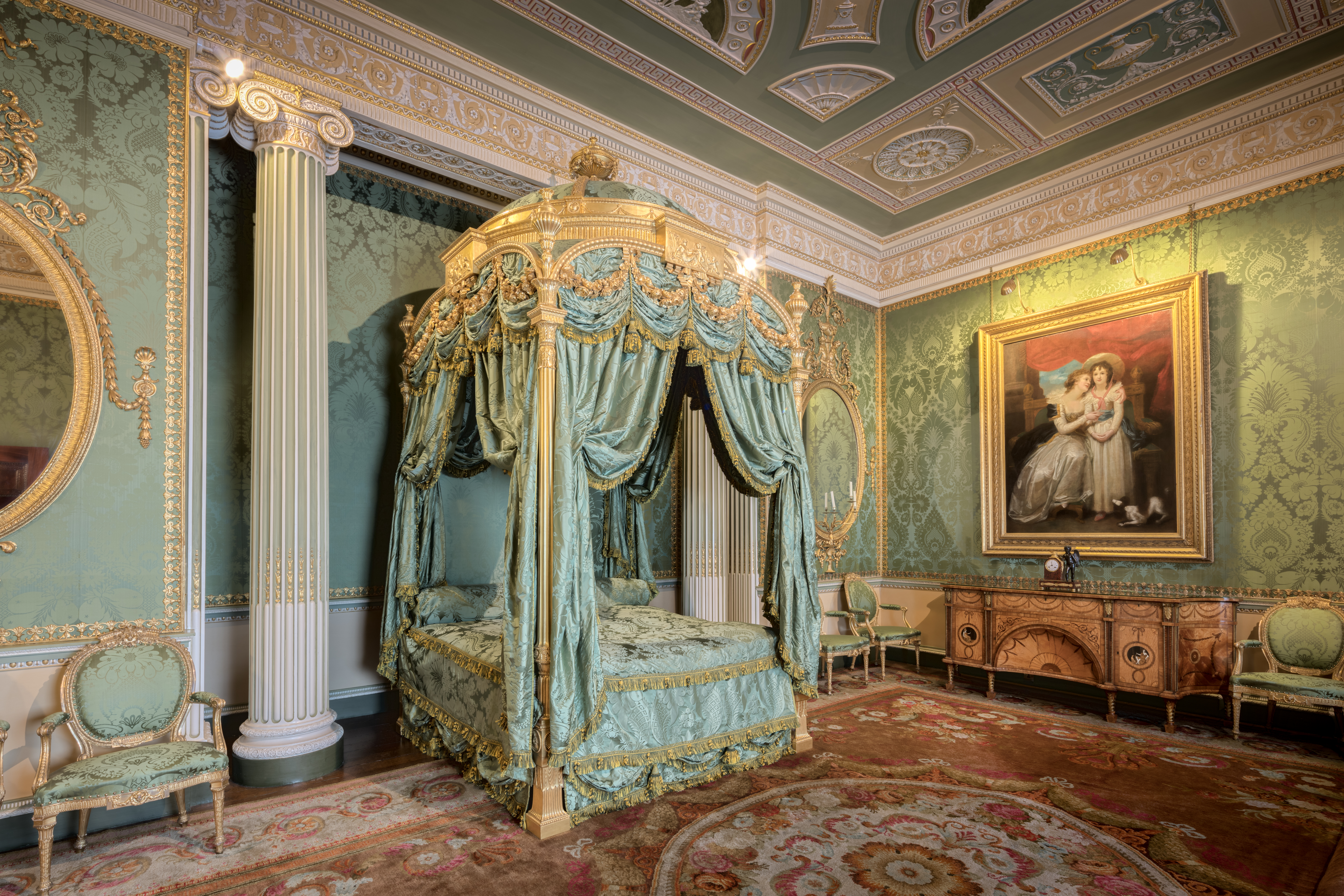
Bedroom in Harewood House, Harewood, West Yorkshire, England, 1759–1771, by Robert Adam

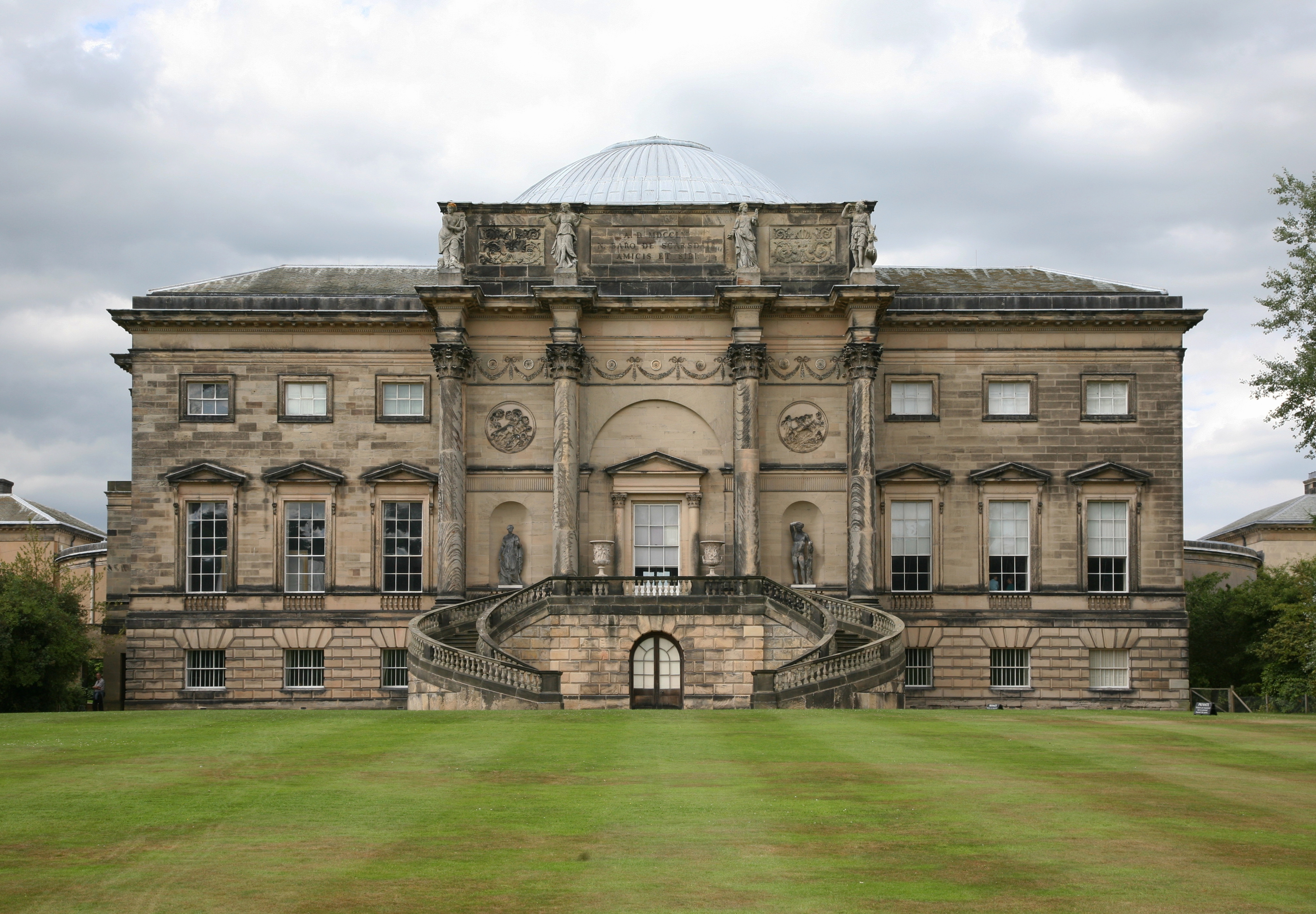
Kedleston Hall, Kedleston, Derbyshire, England based on the Arch of Constantine in Rome, the 1760s, by Robert Adam

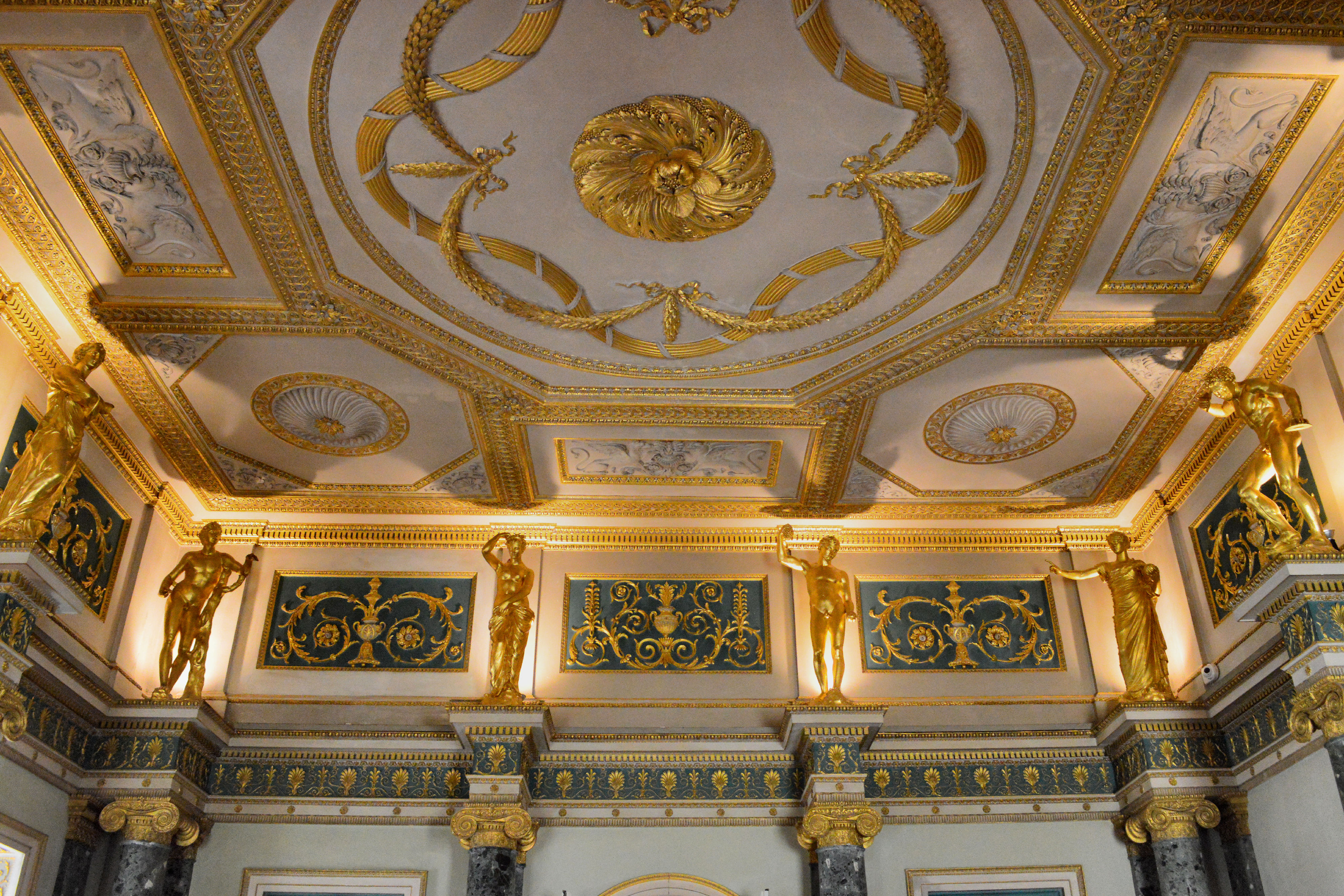
Interior of Syon House, London with Ionic columns and gilded statues, 1767–1775, by Robert Adam

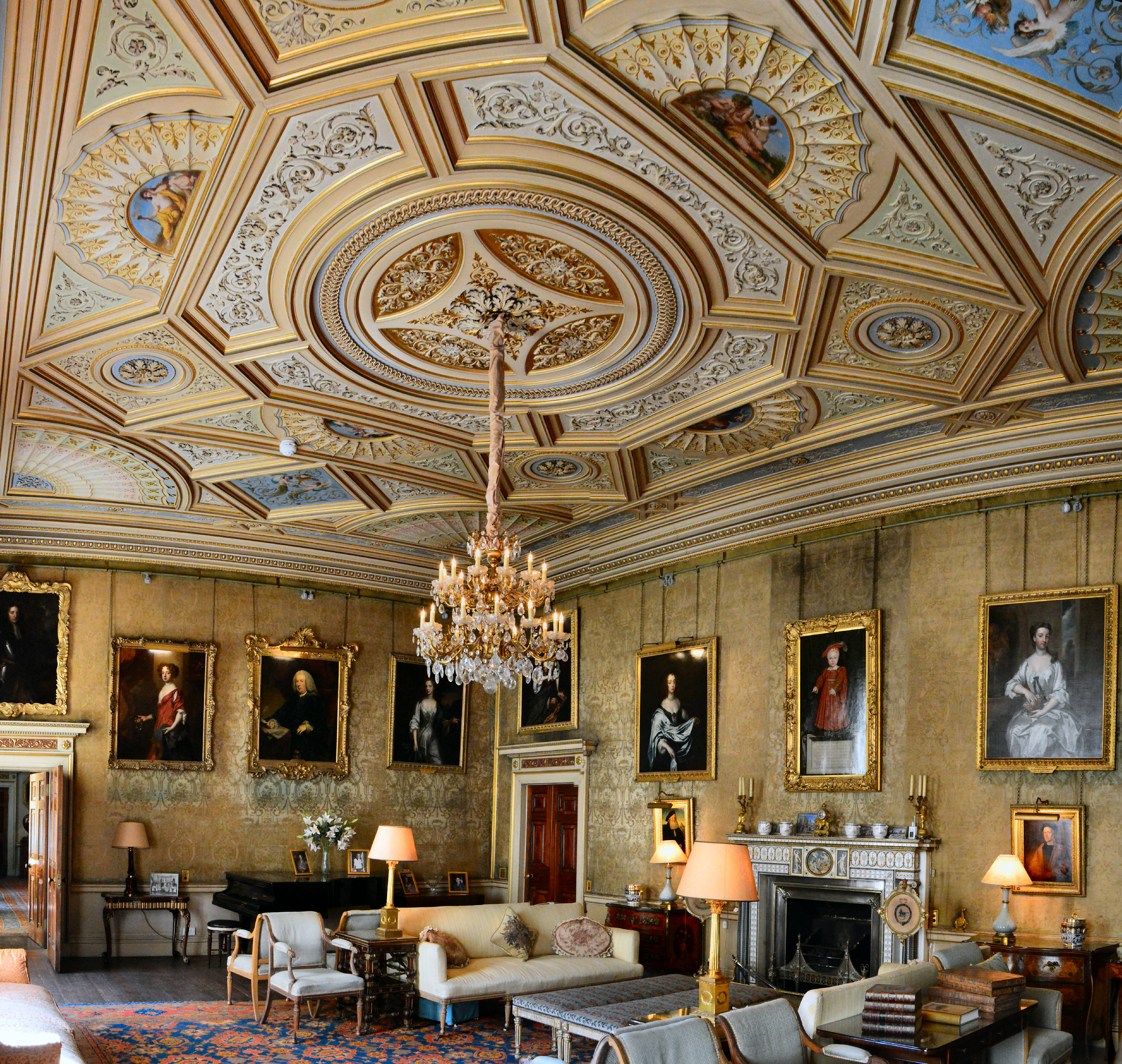
Dining room of Syon House, with a complex ceiling

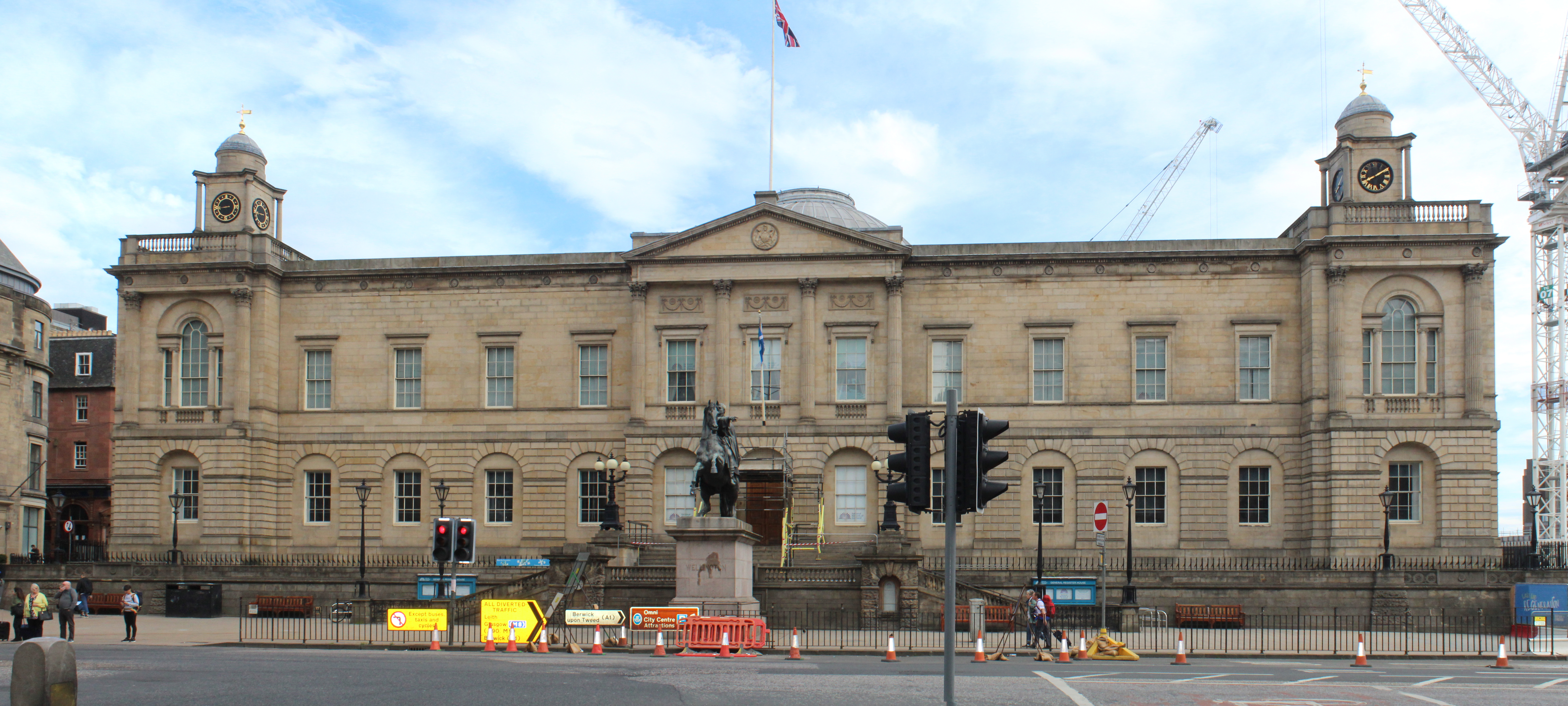
General Register House, Edinburgh, Scotland, 1774–1788, by Robert Adam

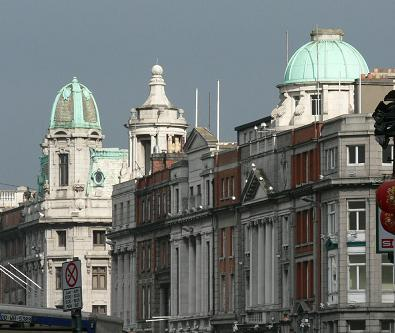
Buildings in Lower O'Connell Street, Dublin constructed between 1918 and 1923 in the highly refined and aesthetically restrained style typical of the Irish capital

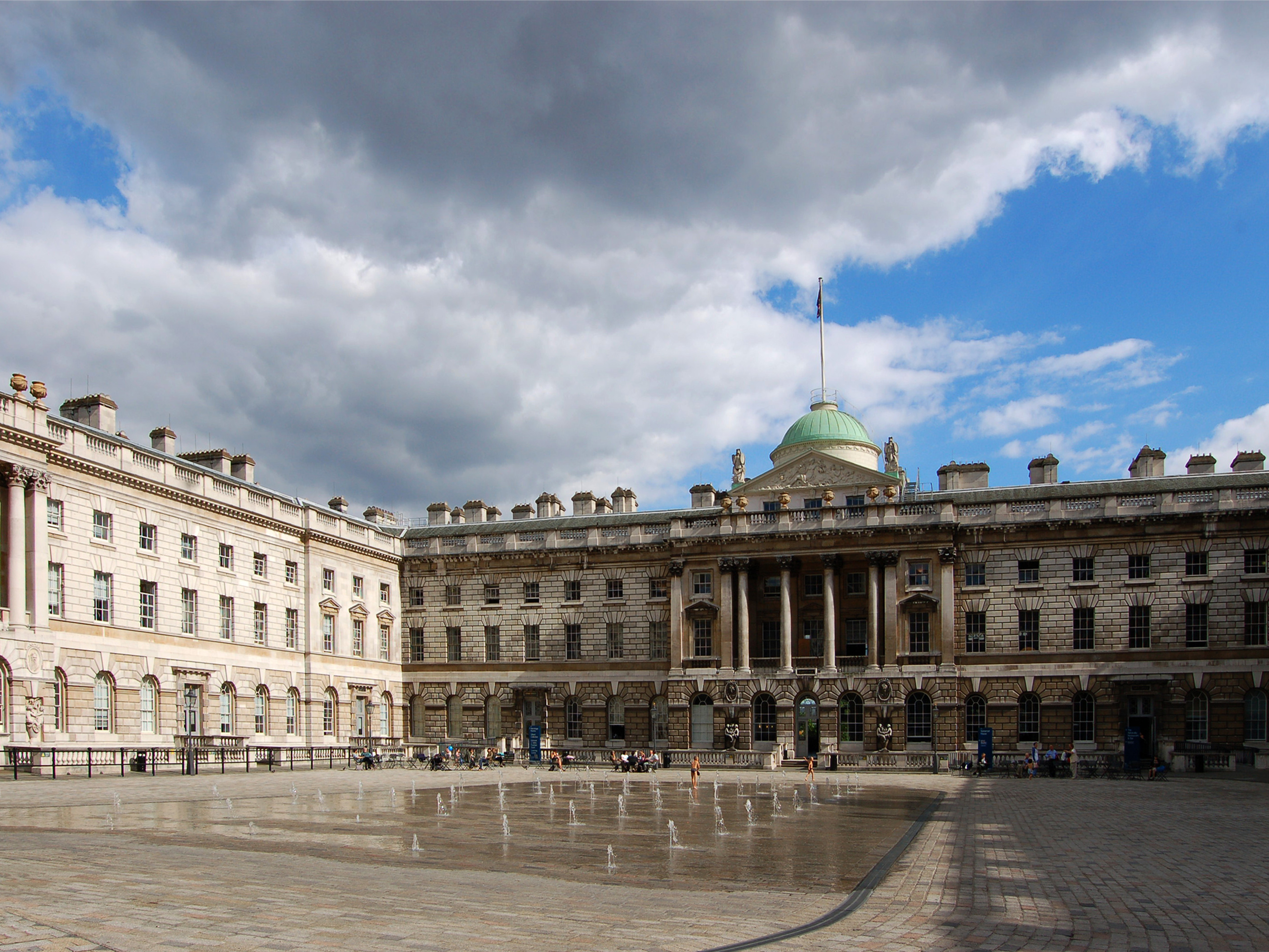
The central courtyard of Somerset House, London, 1776, by Sir William Chambers

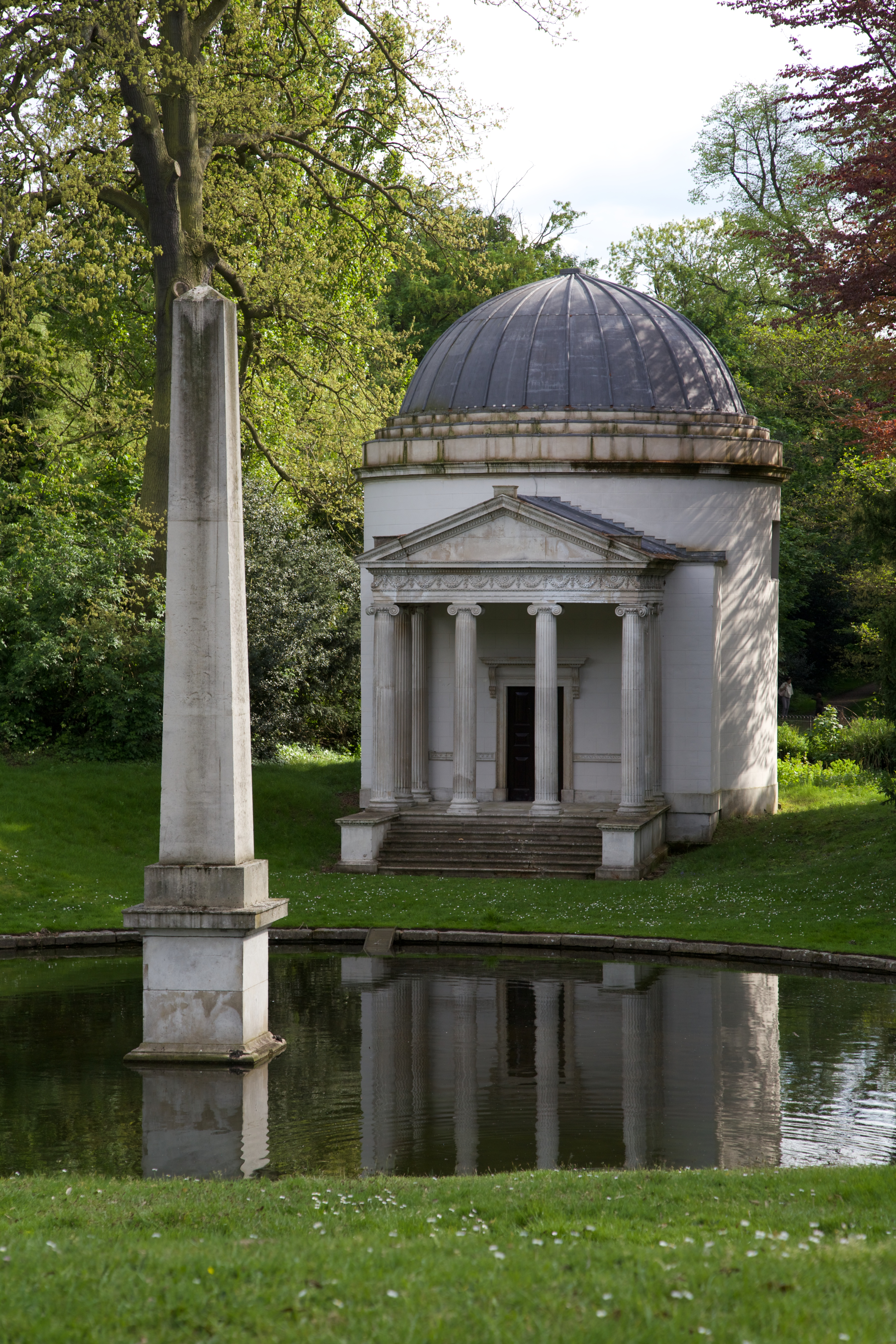
Ionic Temple at Chiswick House, London, an example of English landscape garden

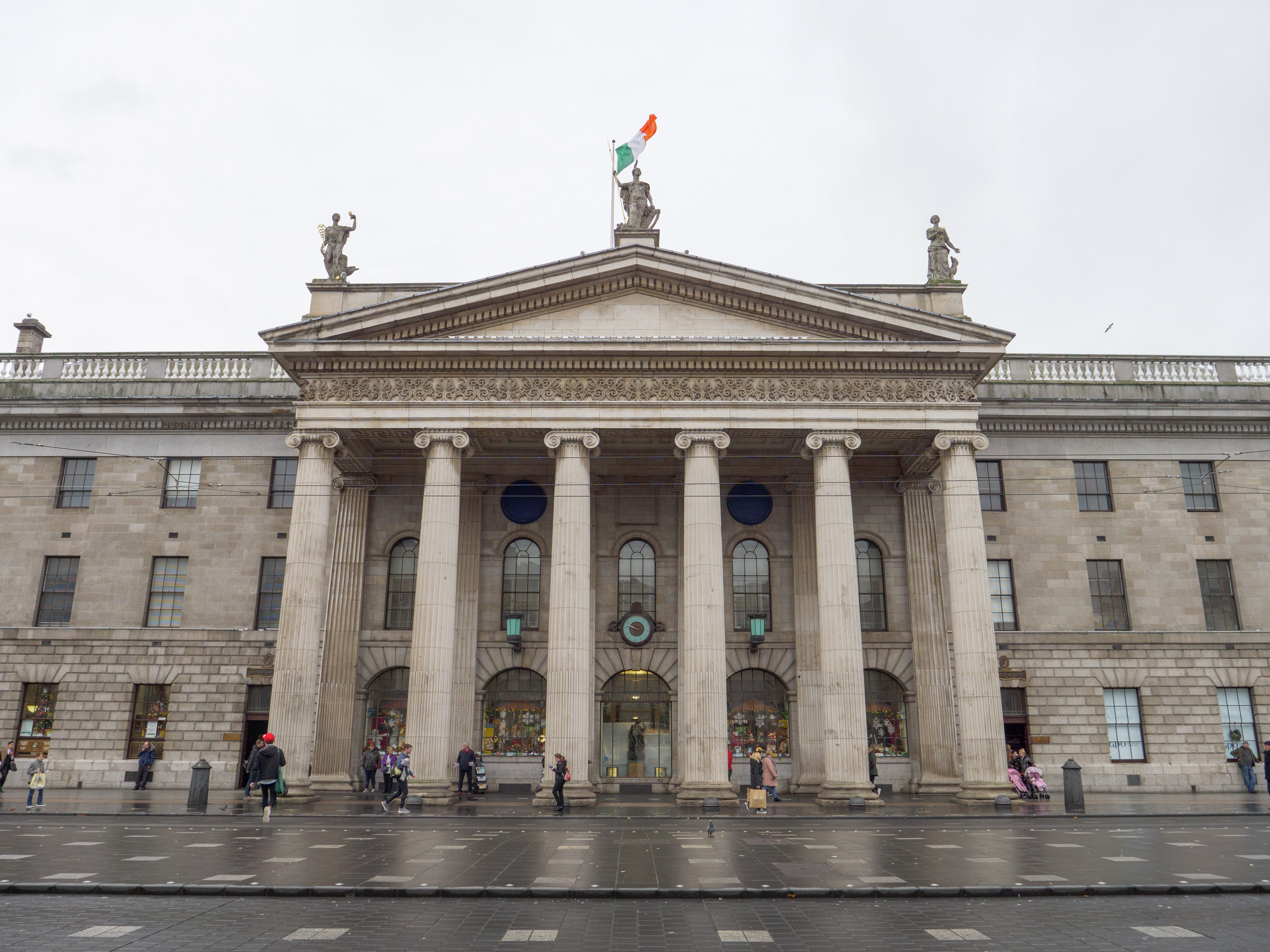
Greek hexastyle portico of the General Post Office, Dublin completed in 1818

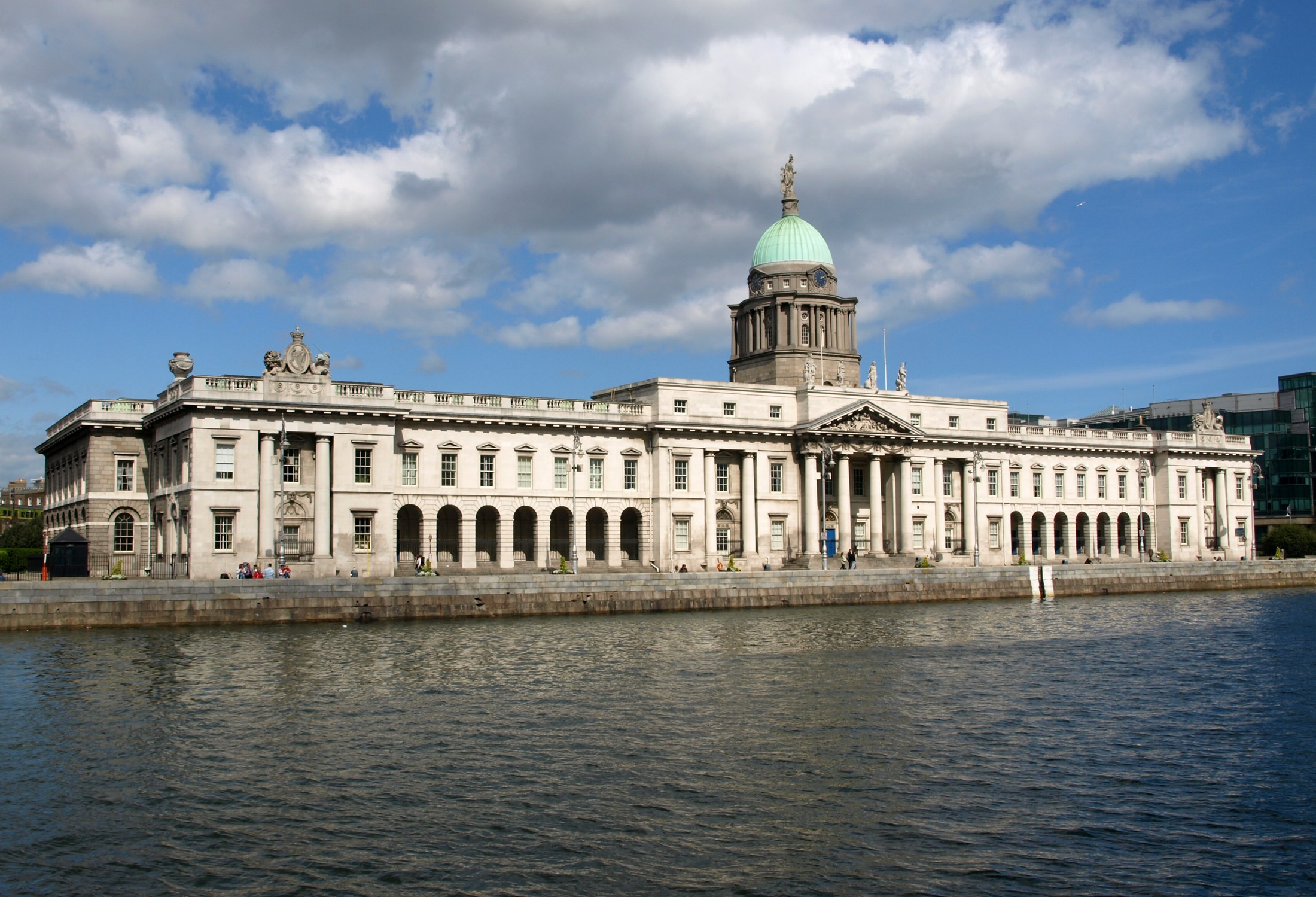
Custom House, Dublin

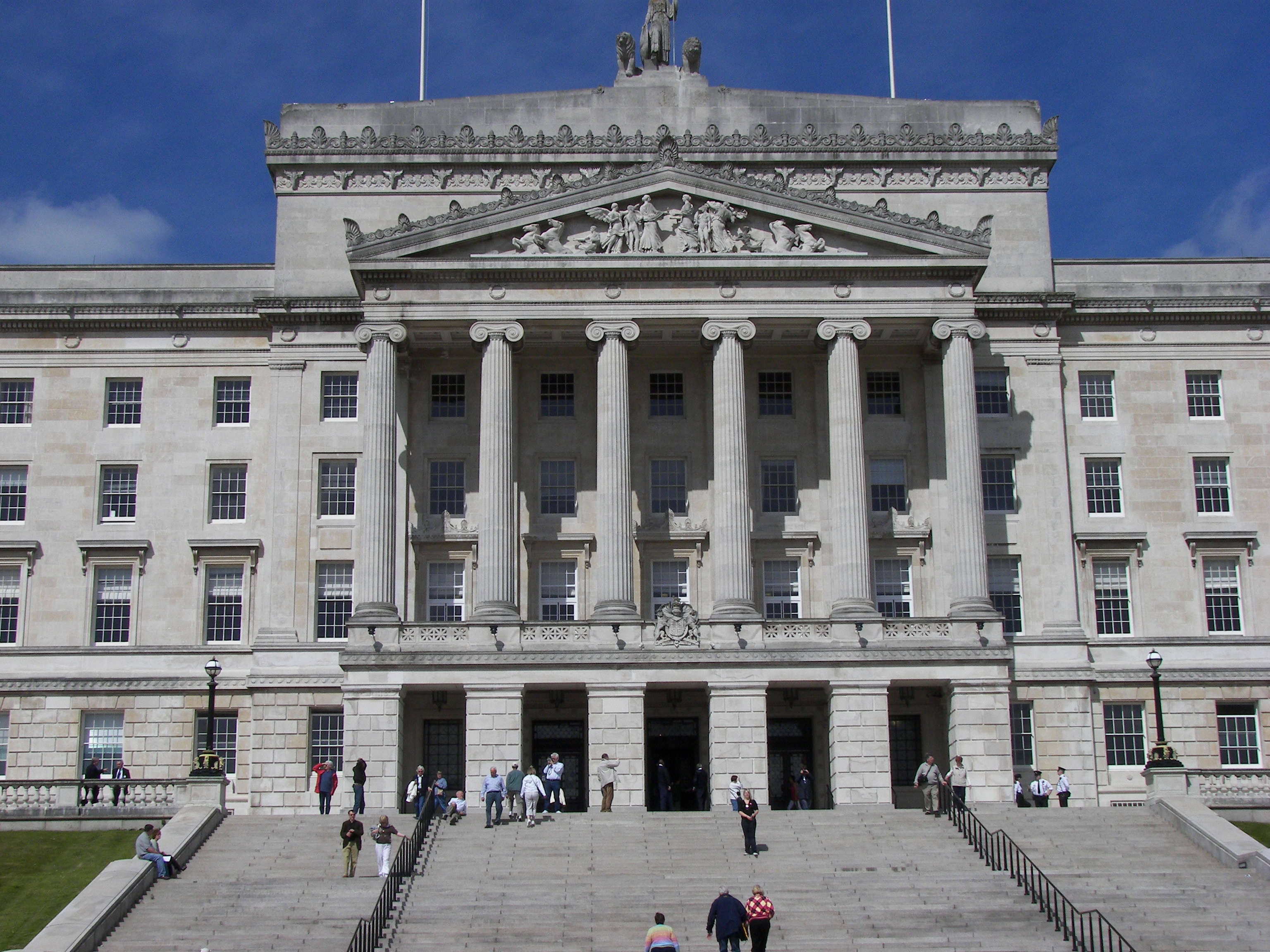
Parliament Buildings, Belfast (1933)

=== Greece ===
After the establishment of the Kingdom of Greece in 1832, the architecture of Greece was mostly influenced by the Neoclassical architecture. For Athens, the first King of Greece, Otto I, commissioned the architects Stamatios Kleanthis and Eduard Schaubert to design a modern city plan. The Old Royal Palace was the first important public building to be built, between 1836 and 1843. Later, in the mid- and late 19th century, Theophil Hansen and Ernst Ziller took part in the construction of many neoclassical buildings. Theophil Hansen designed his first building, the National Observatory of Athens, and two of the three contiguous buildings forming the so-called "Athens Classical Trilogy", namely the Academy of Athens (1859) and the National Library of Greece (1888), the third building of the trilogy being the National and Capodistrian University of Athens (1843), which was designed by his brother Christian Hansen. Also he designed the Zappeion Hall (1888). Ernst Ziller also designed many private mansions in the centre of Athens which gradually became public, usually through donations, such as the mansion of Heinrich Schliemann, Iliou Melathron (1880).

The city of Nafplio in the Peloponnese is also an important example of Neoclassical architecture along with the island towns of Poros, Syros (in the capital Ermoupoli) and Symi.

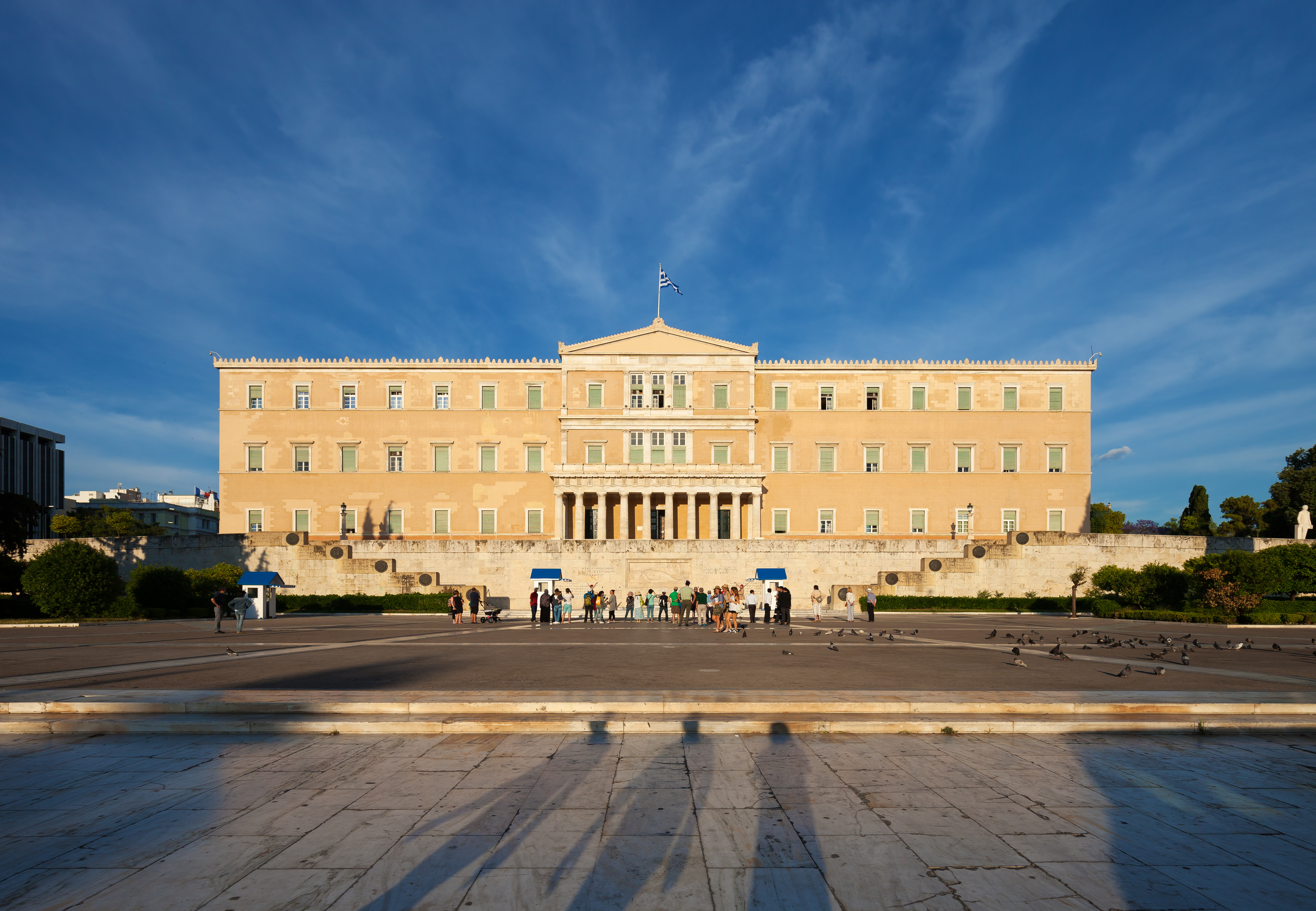
The Old Royal Palace, completed in 1843

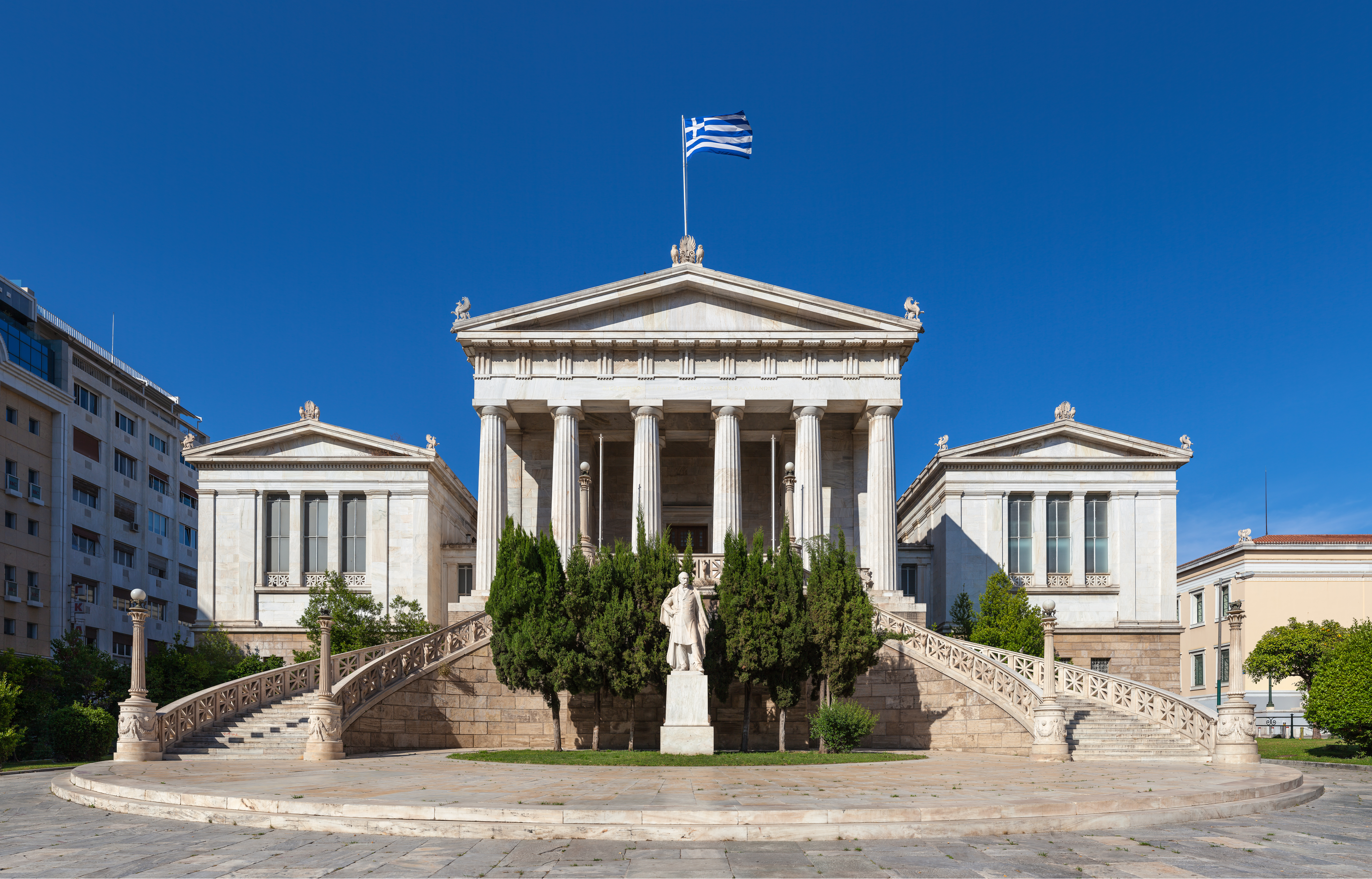
National Library of Greece designed by Theophil Hansen (1888)

The main building of the Academy of Athens, one of Theophil Hansen's "Trilogy" in central Athens (1859)

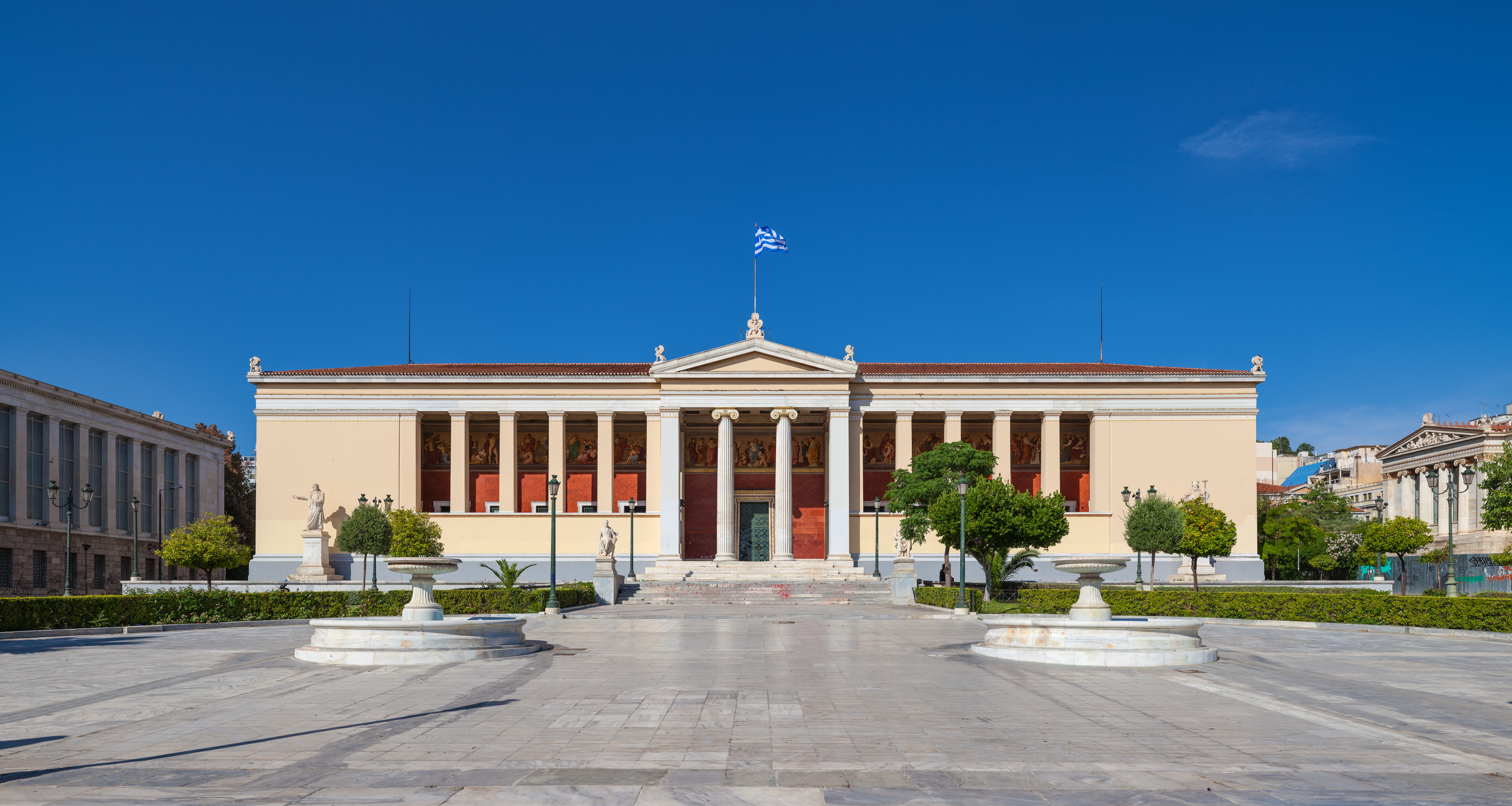
National and Capodistrian University of Athens (1843)

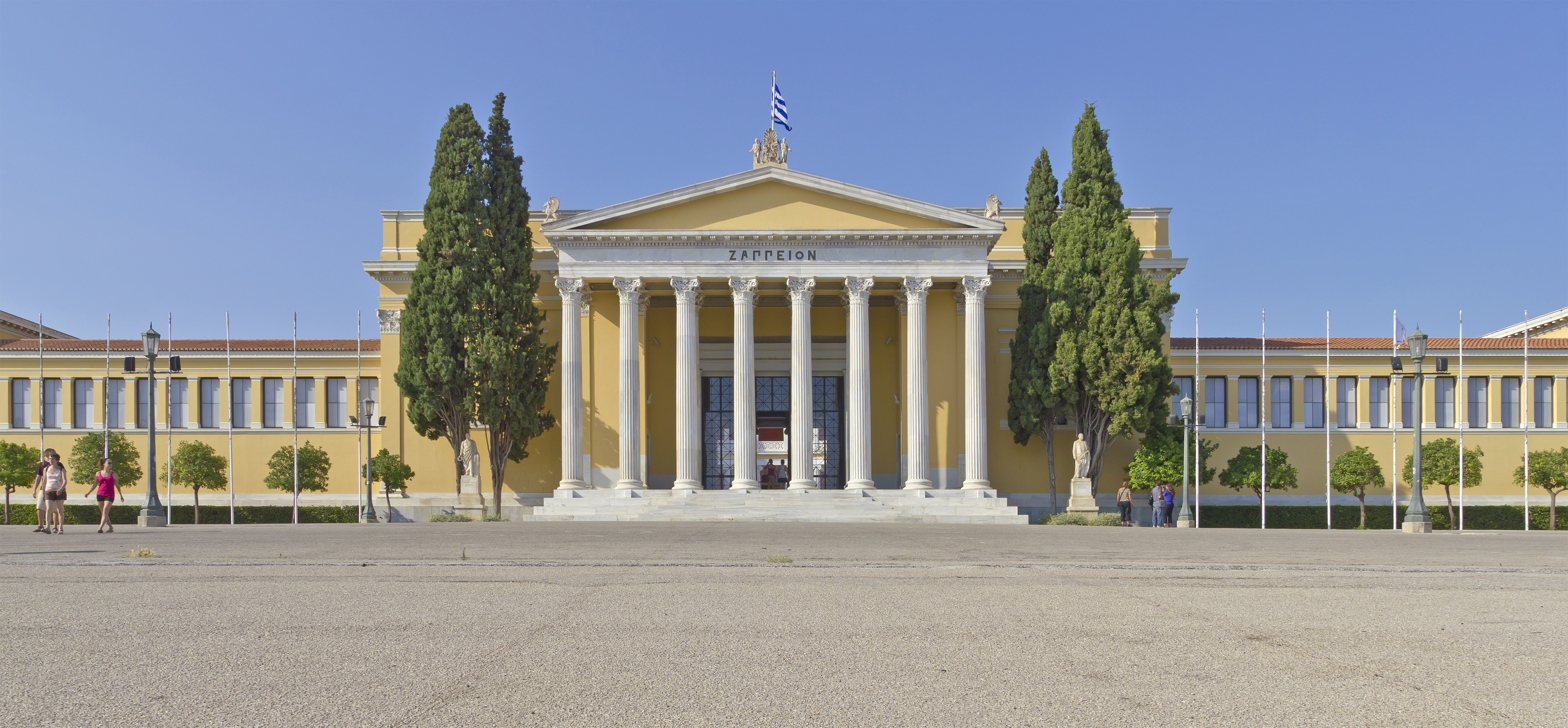
Zappeion (1888)

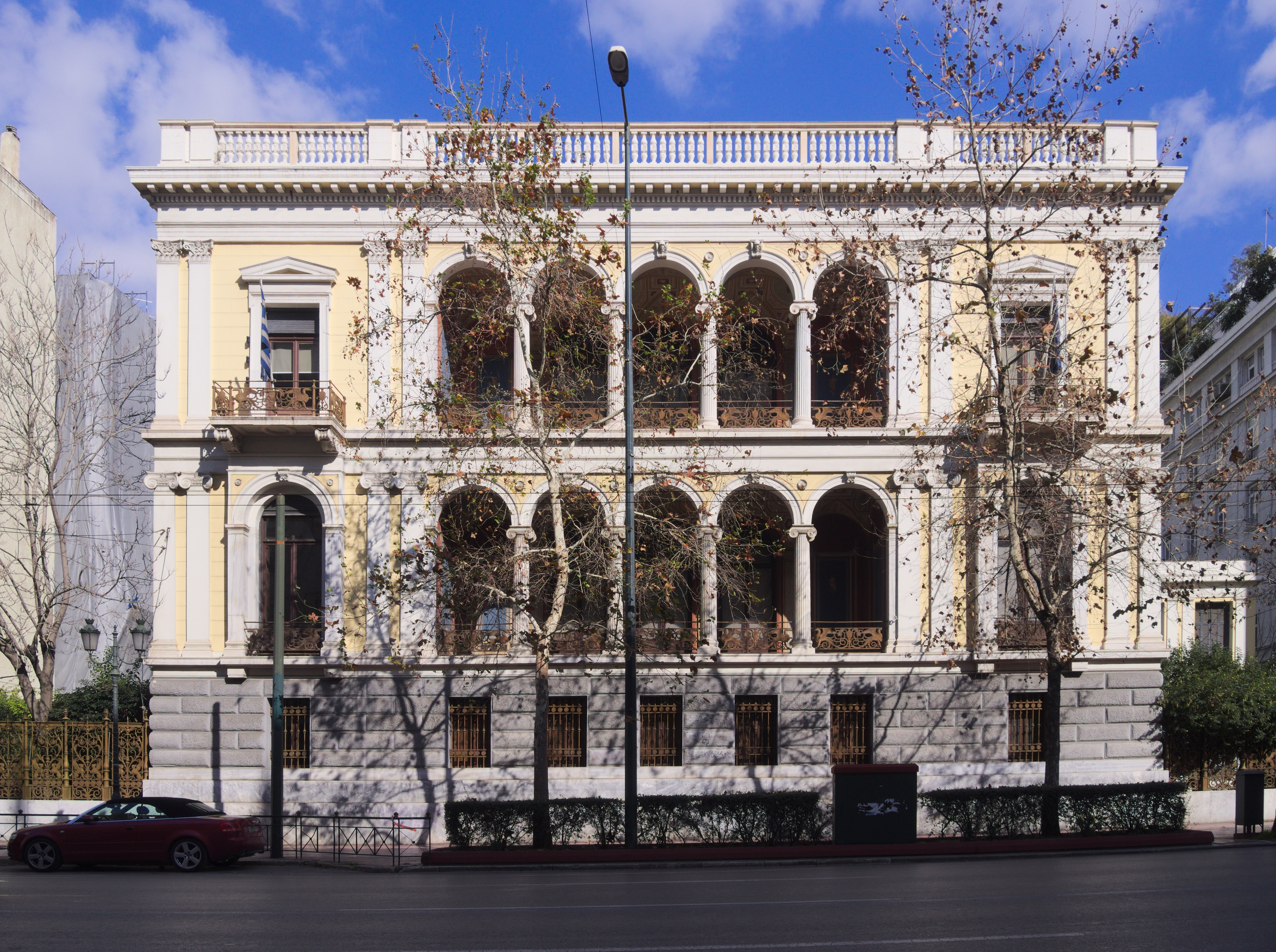
Numismatic Museum of Athens or Iliou Melathron built for Heinrich Schliemann by Ernst Ziller (1880)

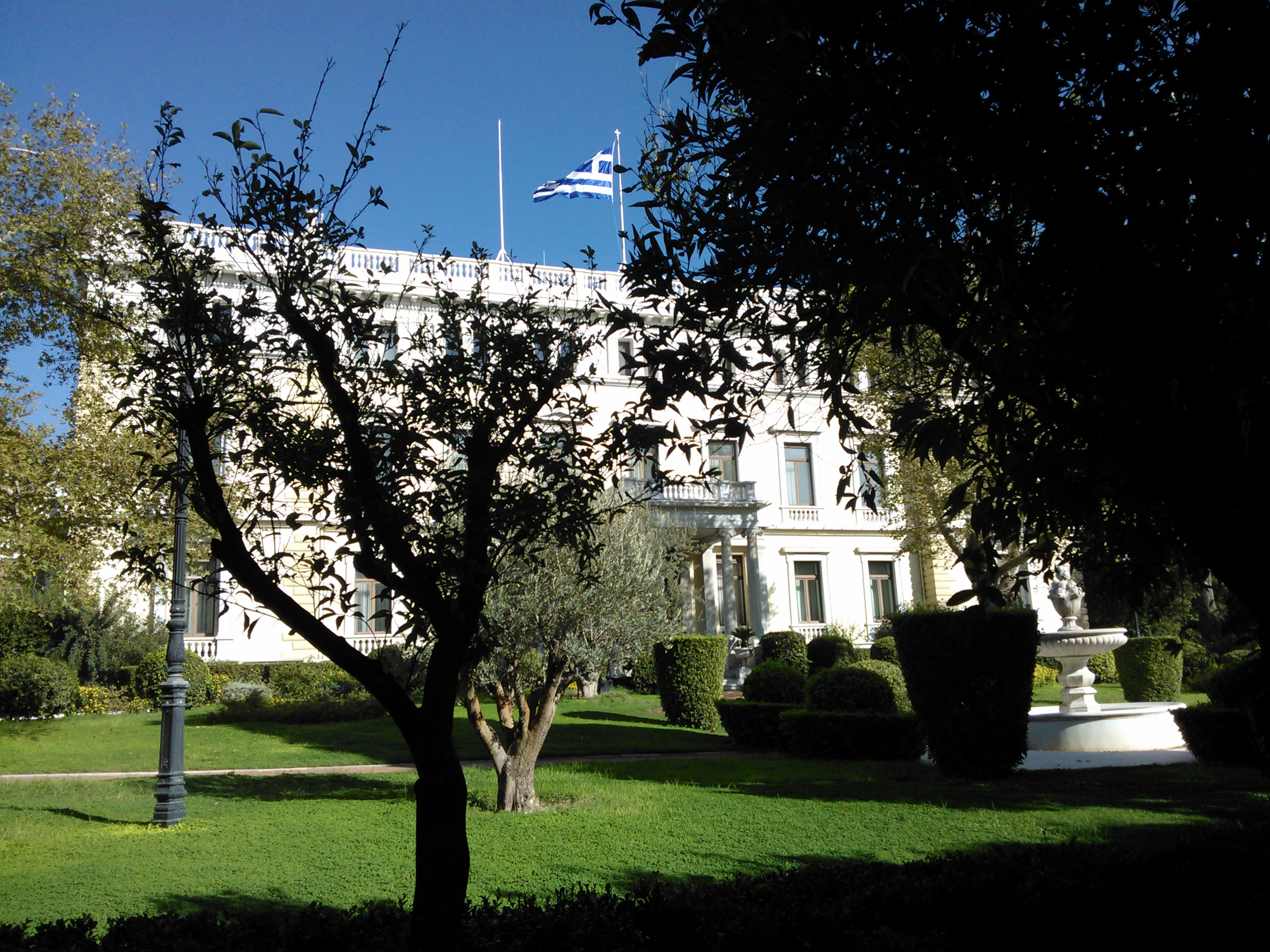
Presidential Mansion, Athens (formerly the Crown Prince's Palace) built by Ernst Ziller

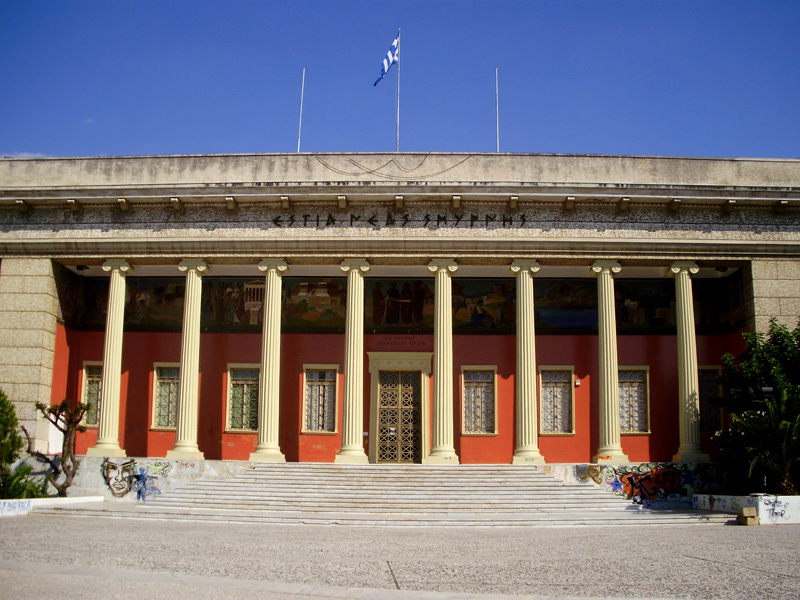
Estia Cultural Center in Nea Smirni, built by Ioannis Pavlidis, Vasilis Raftopoulos, Ioannis Meskouris and Emmanuel Lazaridis (1930–1975)

=== Hungary ===
The earliest examples of neoclassical architecture in Hungary may be found in Vác. In this town the triumphal arch and the neoclassical façade of the Baroque Cathedral were designed by the French architect Isidor Marcellus Amandus Ganneval (Isidore Canevale) in the 1760s. Also the work of a French architect, Jean-Charles-Alexandre Moreau, is the garden façade of the Esterházy Palace (1797–1805) in Kismarton (today Eisenstadt in Austria).

The two principal architects of Neoclassicism in Hungary were Mihály Pollack and József Hild. Pollack's major work is the Hungarian National Museum (1837–1844). Hild is famous for his designs for the Cathedral of Eger and Esztergom. The Reformed Great Church of Debrecen is an outstanding example of the many Protestant churches that were built in the first half of the 19th century. This was the time of the first iron structures in Hungarian architecture, the most important of which is the Széchenyi Chain Bridge by William Tierney Clark.

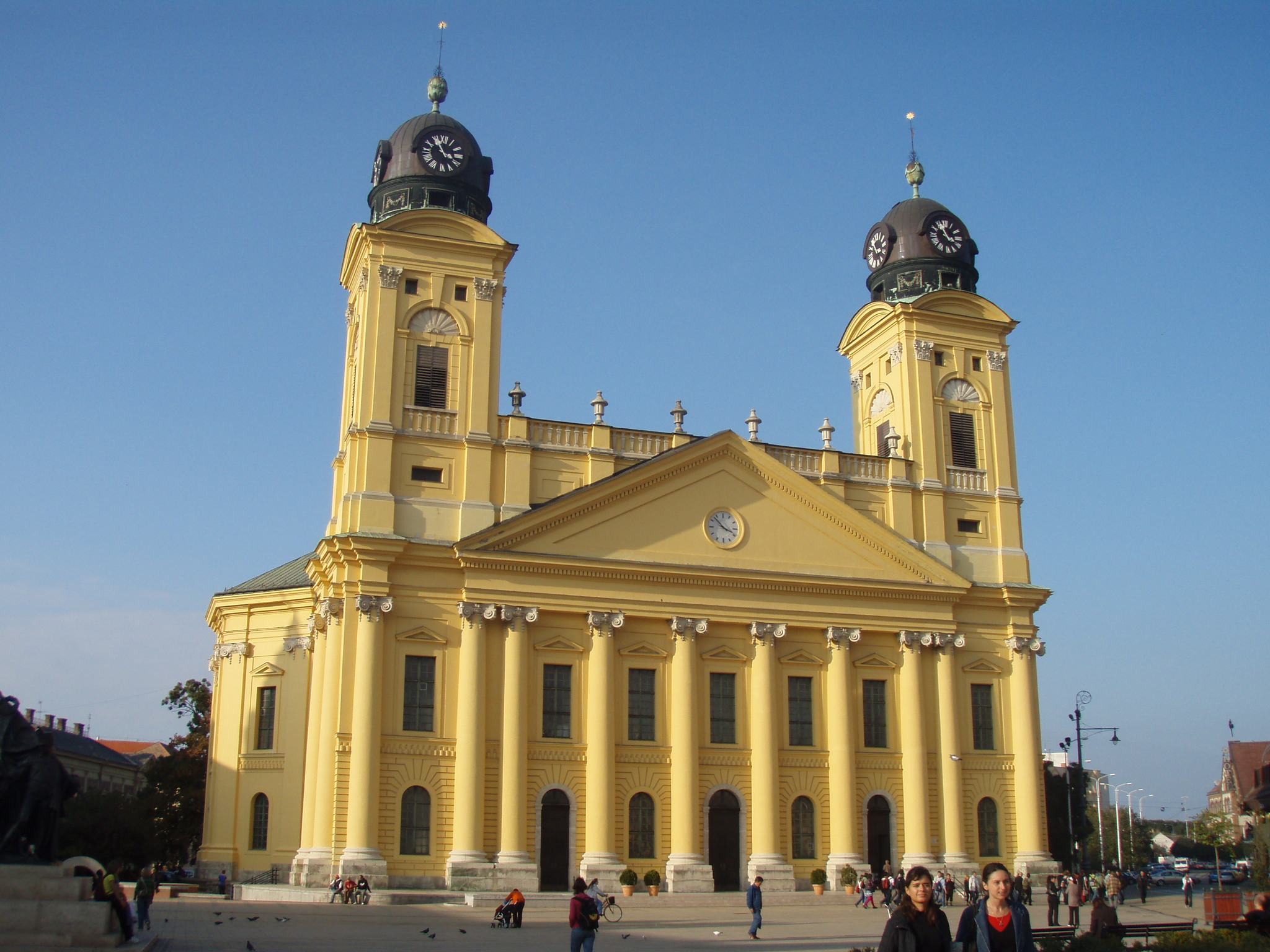
Reformed Great Church of Debrecen (1805–1824)

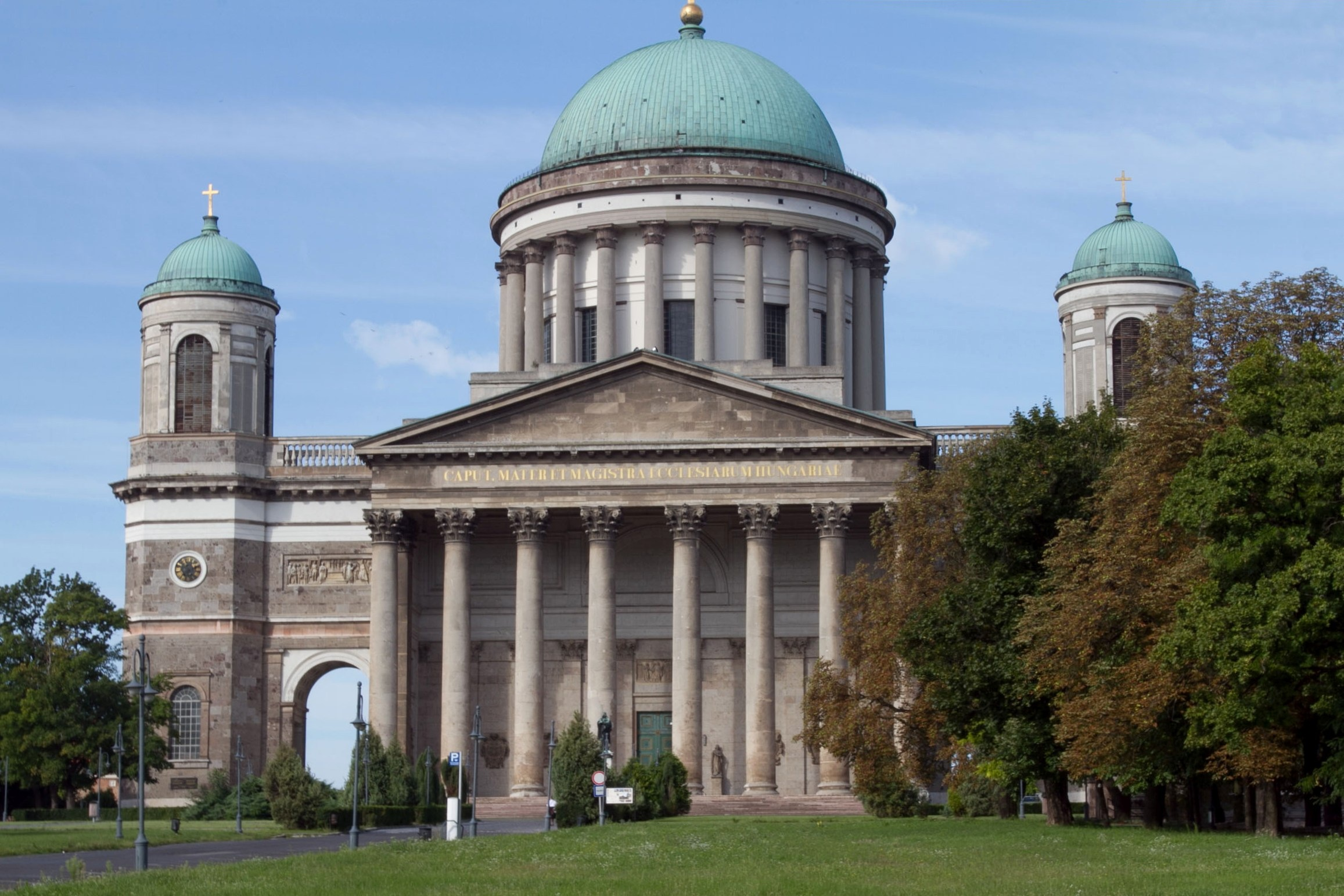
Esztergom Basilica (1822–1869)

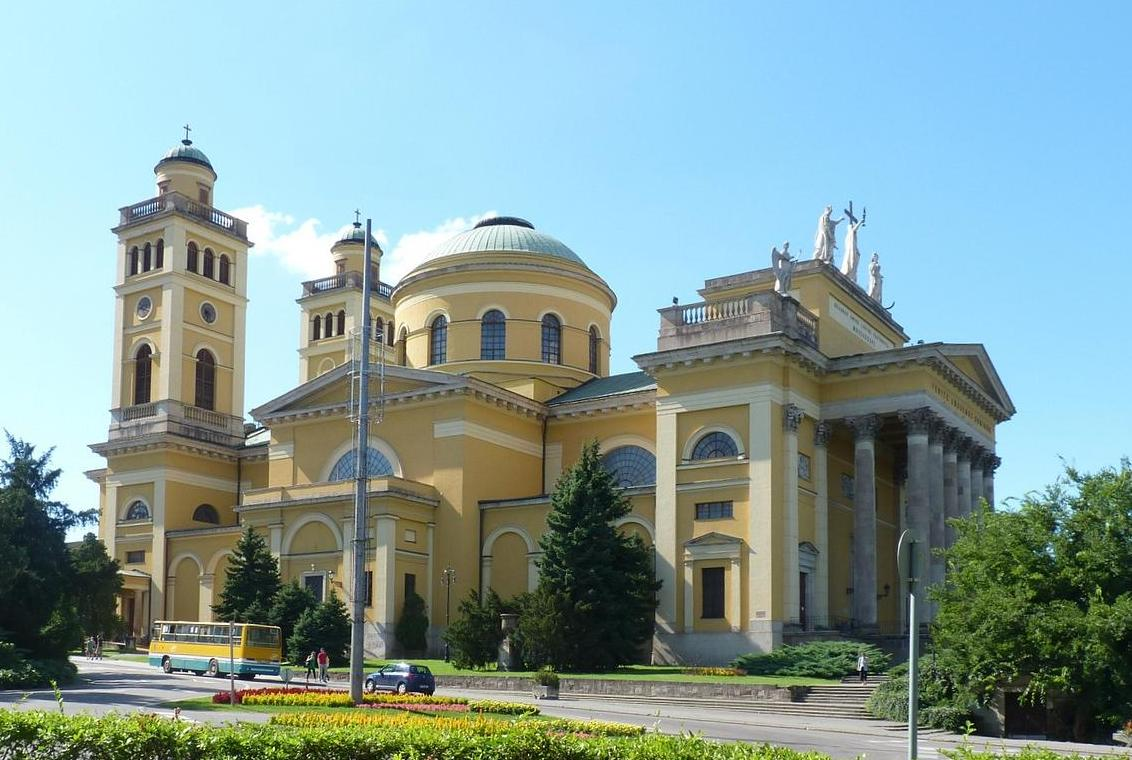
Cathedral Basilica of Eger (1831–1837)

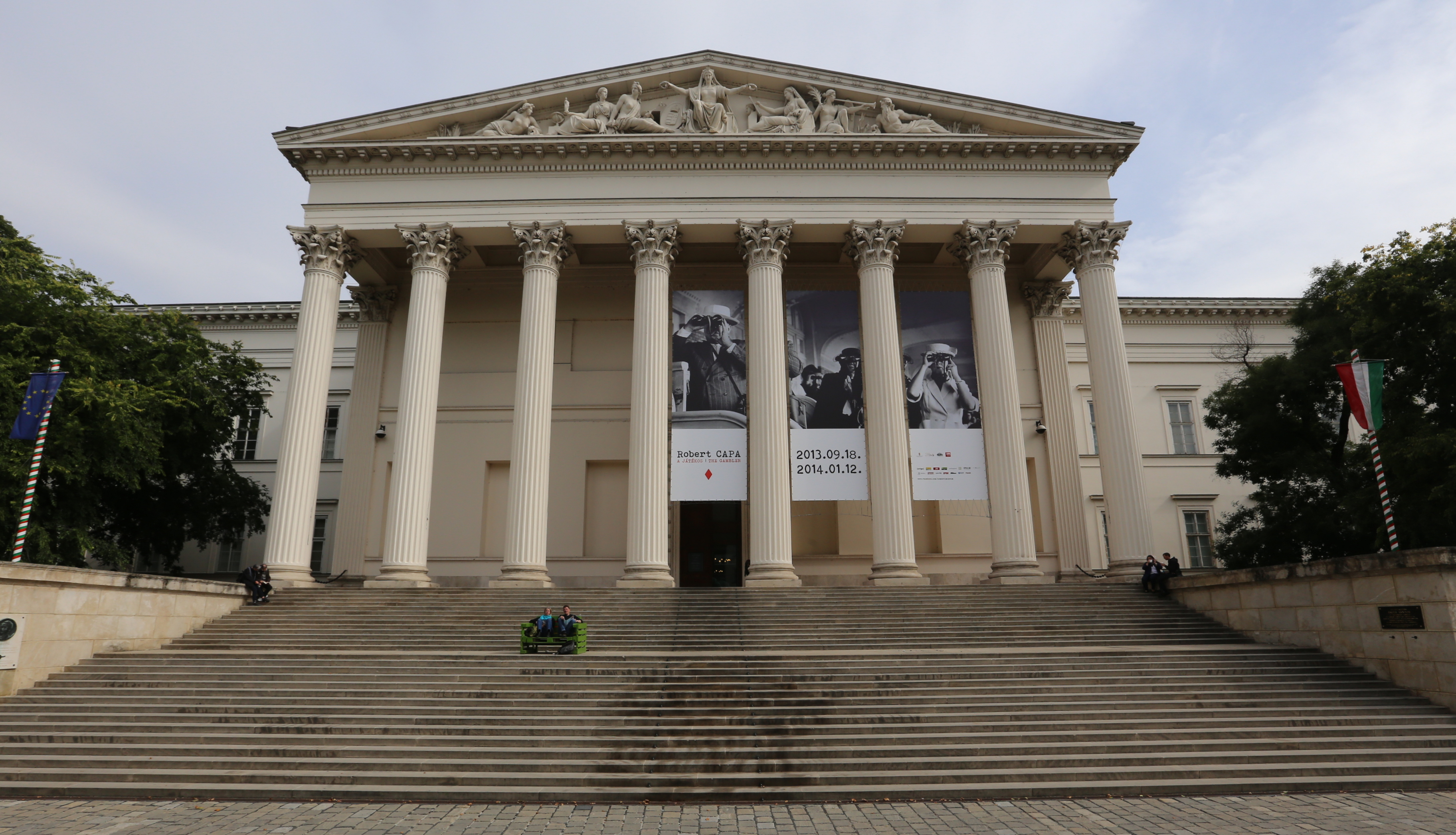
Hungarian National Museum (1837–1844)

=== Turkey ===
Neoclassical architecture started being introduced to the Ottoman Empire in the 19th century through multiple channels, including the work and presence of foreign Western European architects and the Balyan family (The personal architects of the Ottoman throne) adopting the style. While exposure happened before, construction and normalization of the style didn't accelerate until the Tanzimat and Constitutional periods of the late empire. Rather than strictly adopting just neoclassicism, the imperial architecture of this period mostly embraced structural eclecticism, layering neoclassical components over traditional Ottoman layouts and lavish Western Baroque ornamentations. The Sultans built lavish imperial palaces, mosques, governmental, and municipal buildings in this style. Notable examples from this period include the Nusretiye Clock Tower (1841), Dolmabahçe Palace (1856), Çırağan Palace (1867), and the Istanbul Archaeology Museum (1891).

The Greek communities of Anatolia and mainland Greece also had an influence in the exposure to neoclassicist architecture in the Ottoman Empire, especially after the Greek Enlightenment and independence of the Kingdom of Greece, Greek intellectuals, engineers, and architects began planning, constructing and financing buildings on Ottoman land, specifically to major cosmopolitan cities with a high Greek population like Izmir and Istanbul, the Greeks reserved these buildings for public institutions and academies, a significant chunk of buildings built during that era were lost during the Burning of Smyrna in 1922 with some surviving. Notable examples include Namık Kemal High School (circa 1800s), and the Izmir Atatürk High School (1912).

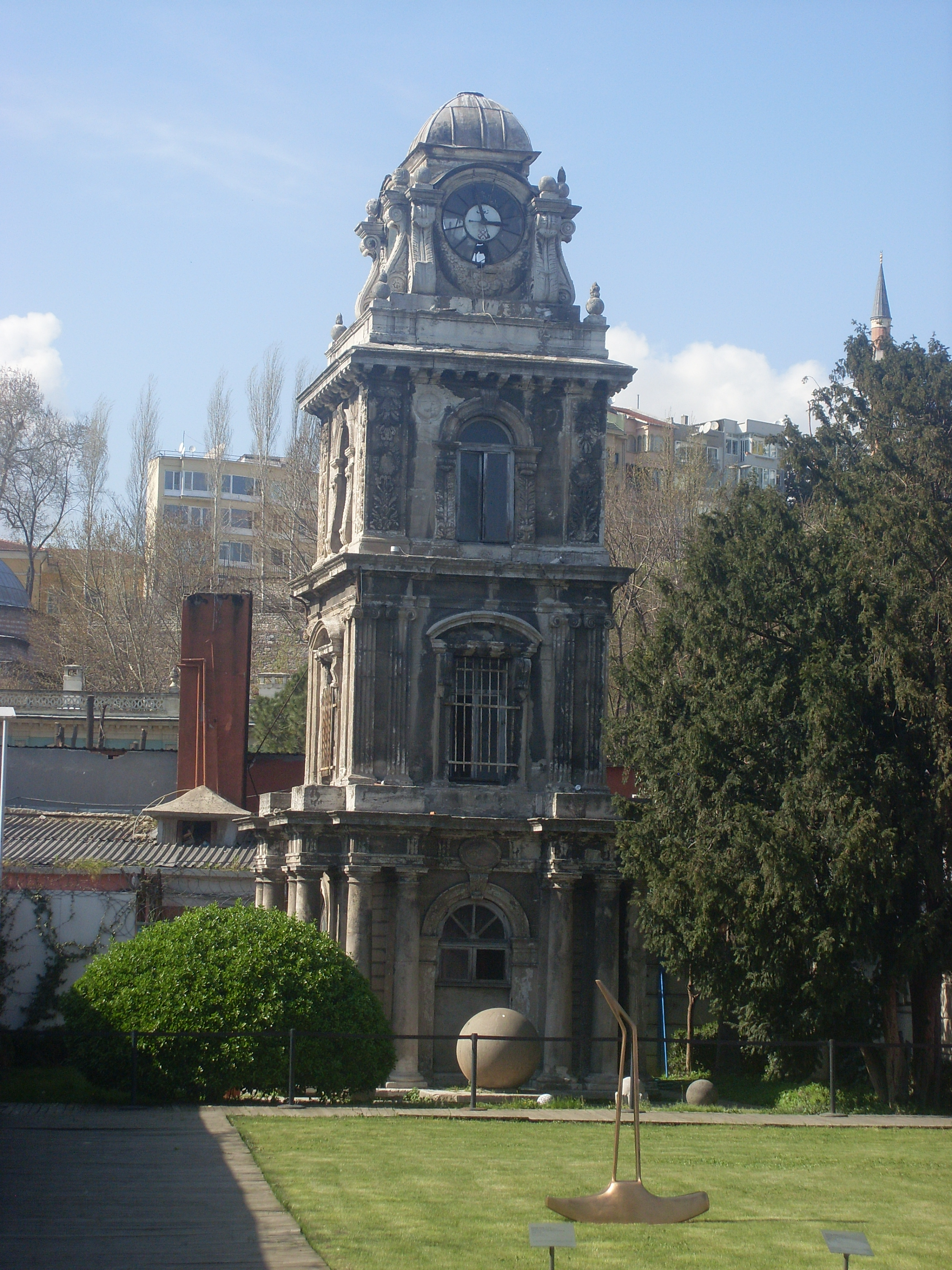
Nusretiye Clock Tower, designed by Garabet Amira Balyan (1841)

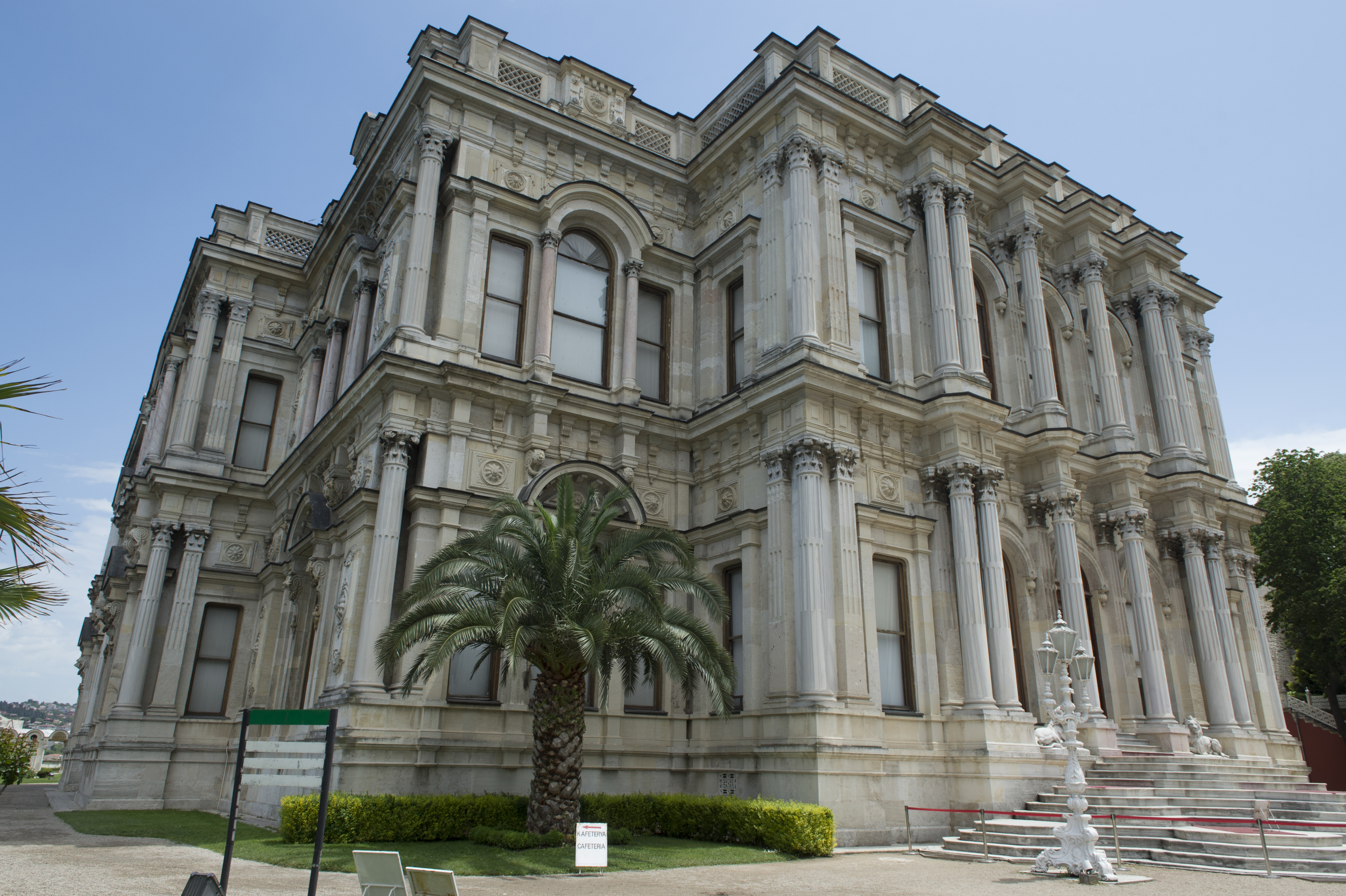
Beylerbeyi Palace, designed by Hagop Balyan, Sarkis Balyan (built between 1861–1865)

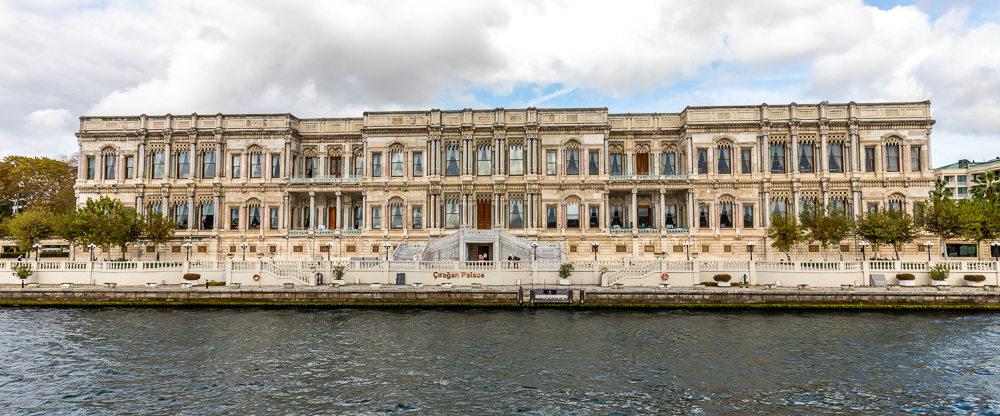
Çırağan Palace, designed by Nigoğayos, Sarkis and Hagop Balyan (built between 1863–1867)

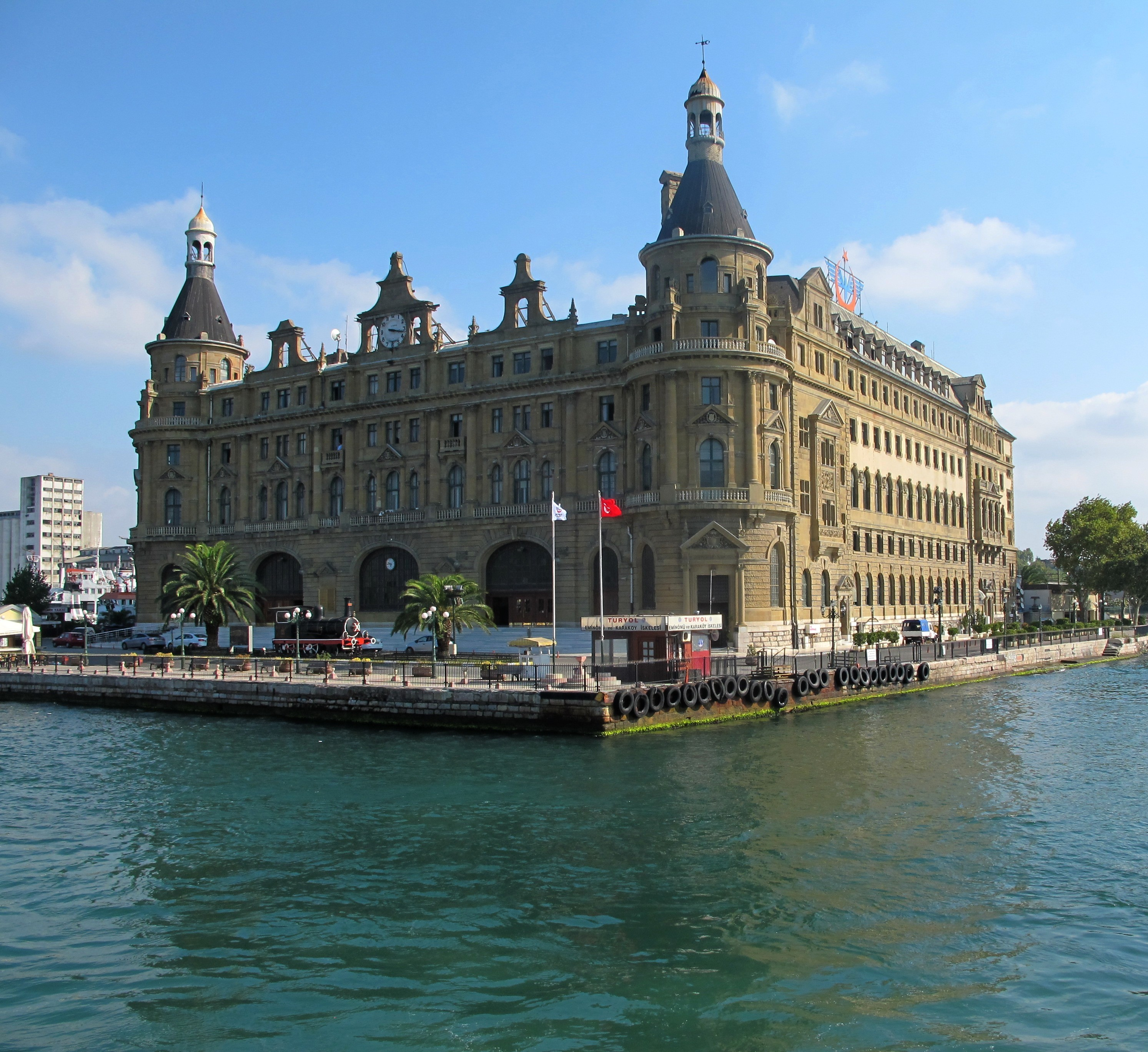
Haydarpaşa Terminal, designed by Otto Ritter and Helmut Conu (1906)

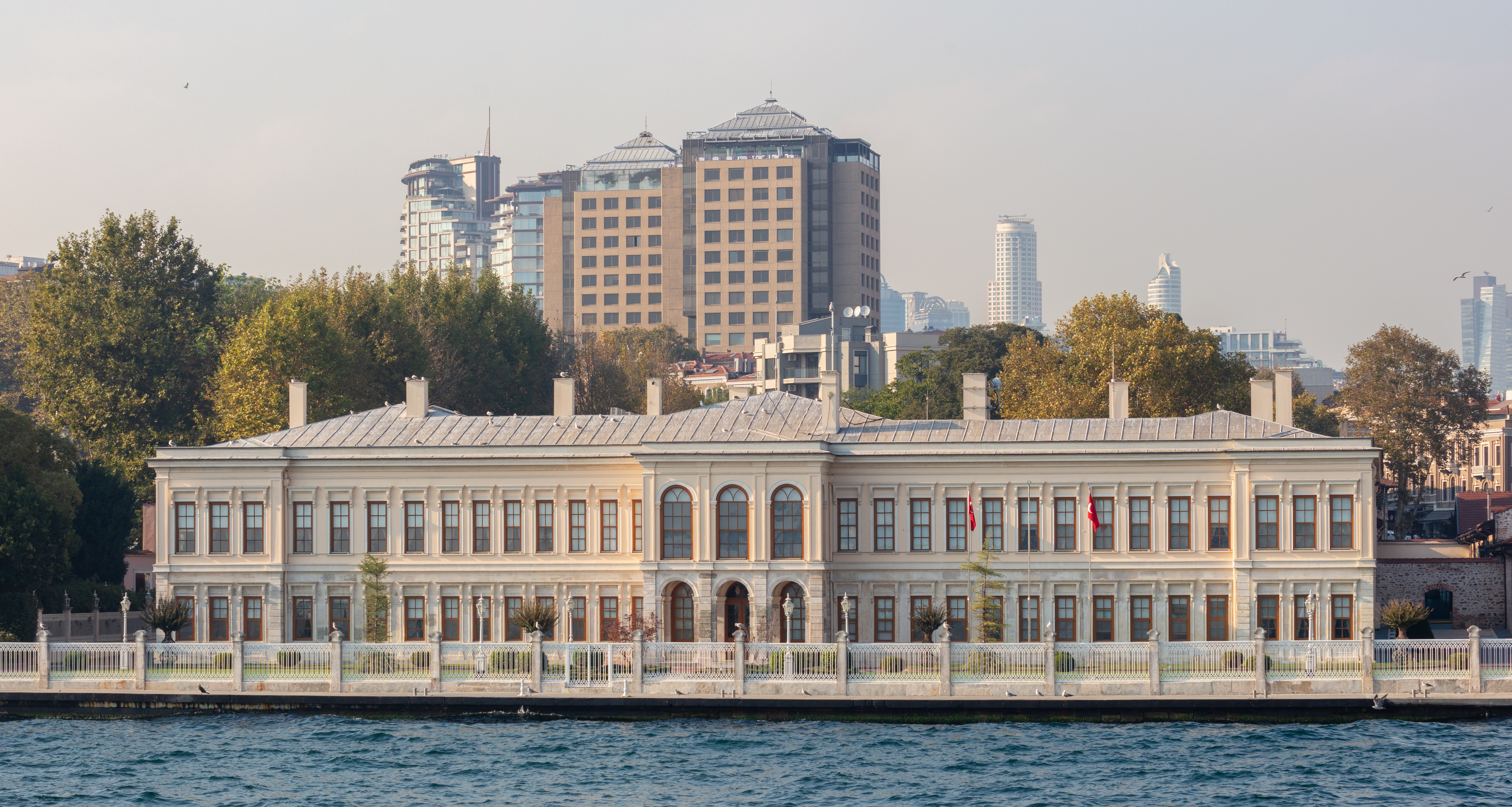
Dolmabahçe Palace, designed by Garabet and Nigoğayos Balyan (1843–1856)

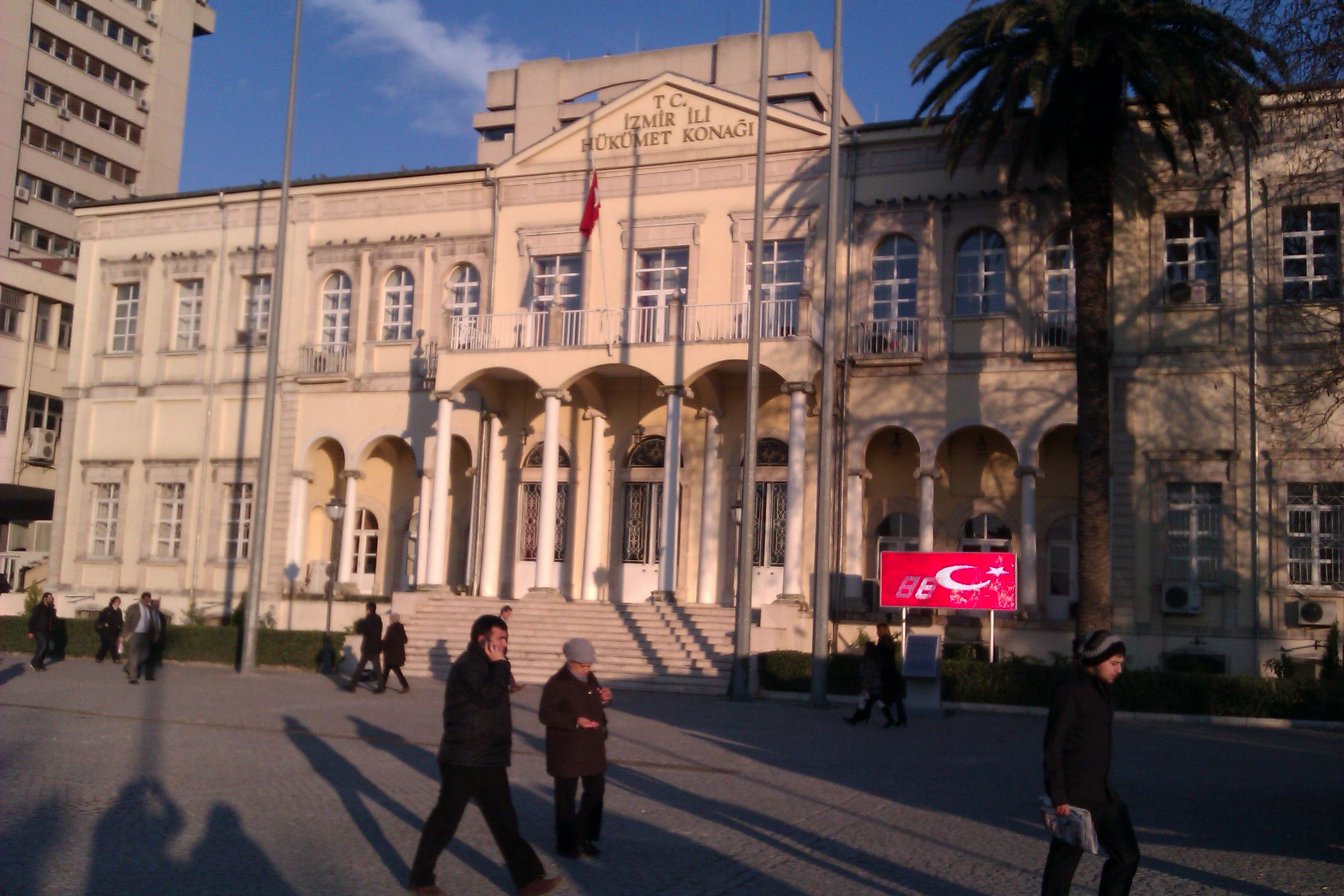
Izmir Governor's Office, designed by Roch Vitali (built between 1867–1876)

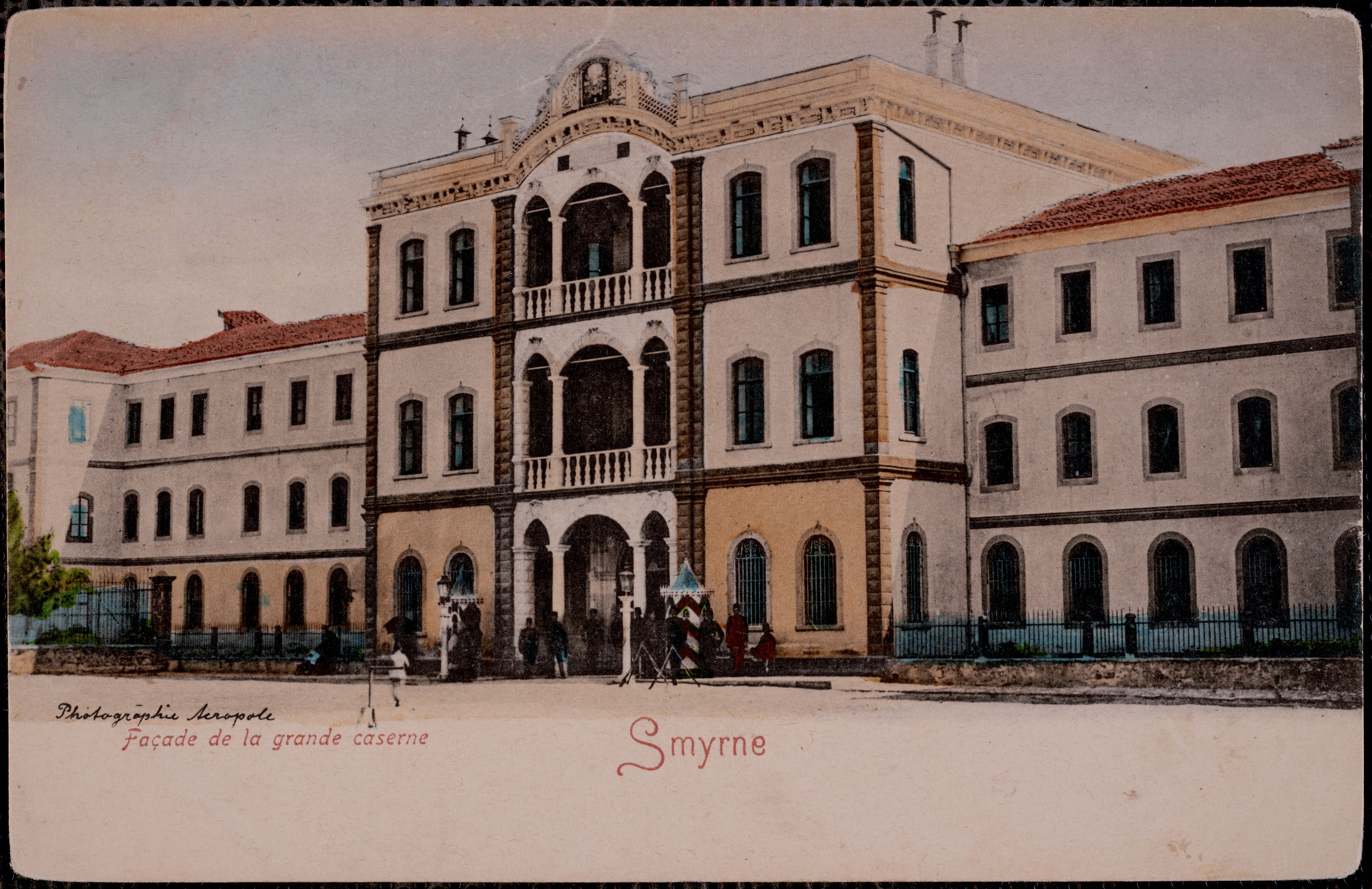
Sarıkışla (Kışla-i Humayun), designed by Mustafa Saib (1830), demolished in 1955

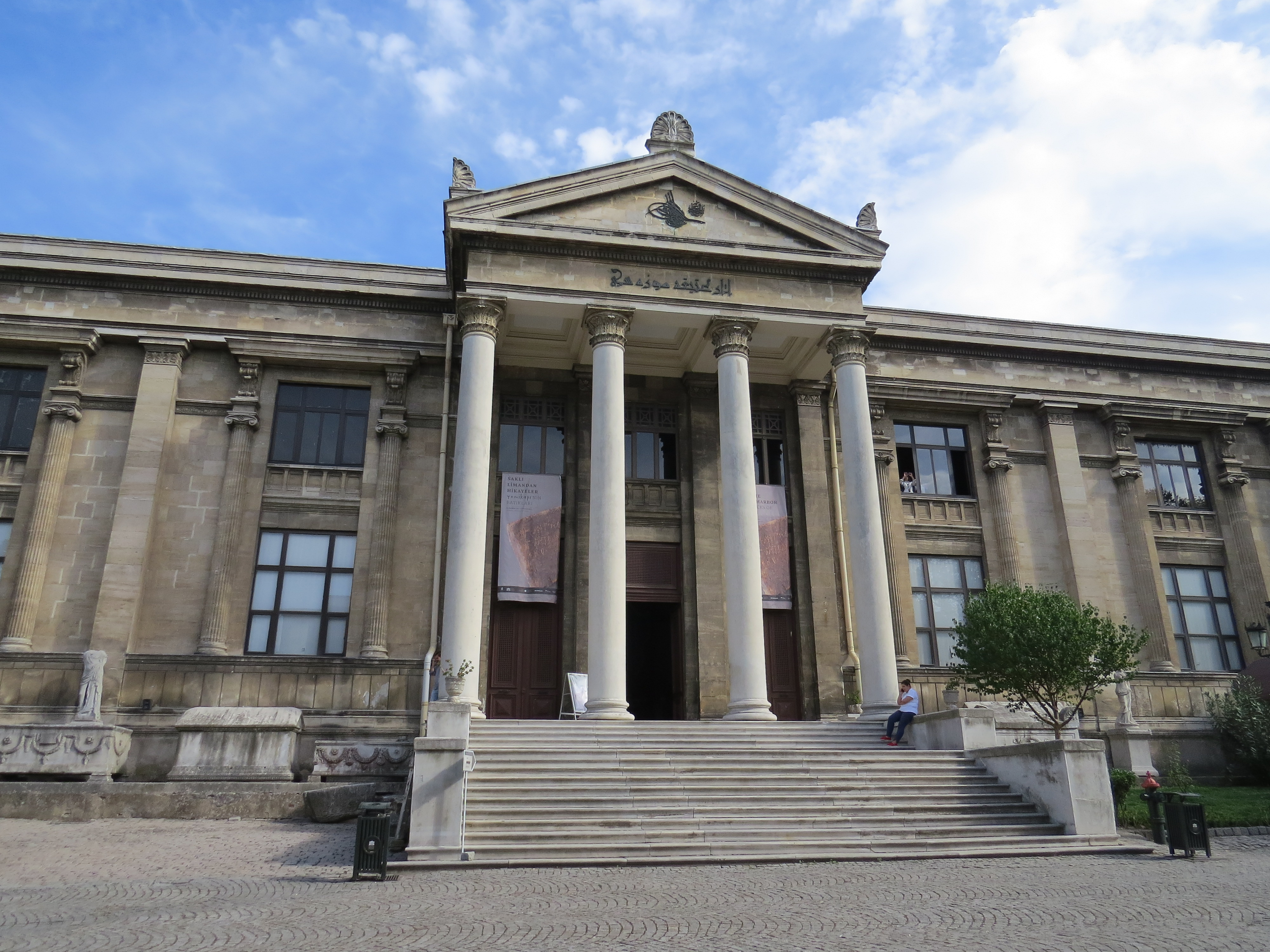
Istanbul Archaeology Museum main building, designed by Alexandre Vallaury (built between 1881–1891)

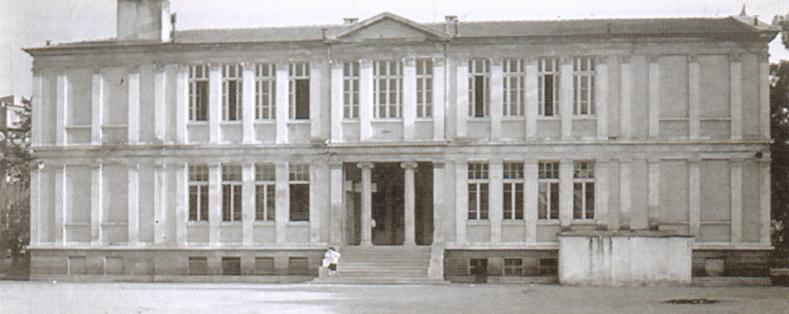
Namık Kemal High School (formerly the Evangelical School) (circa 1800s)

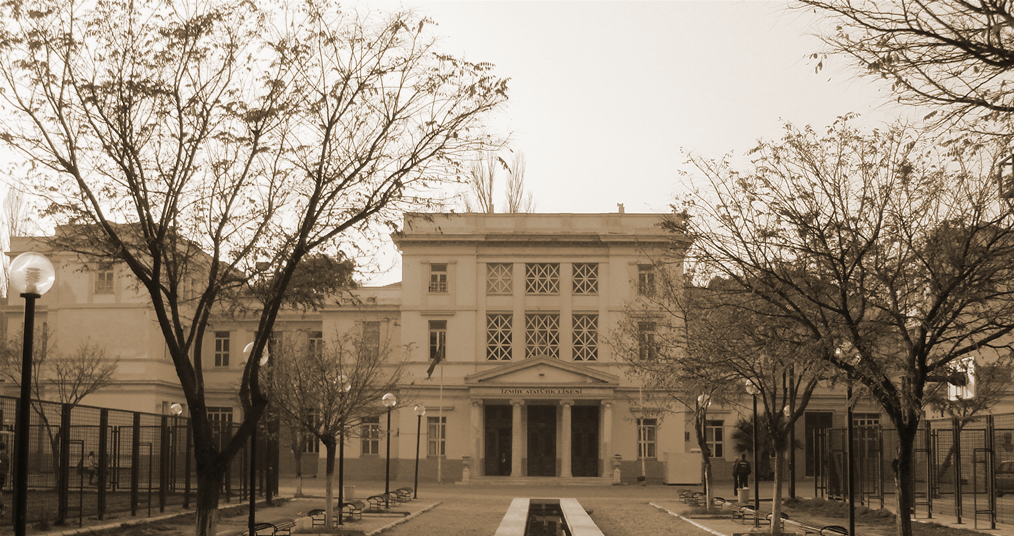
Izmir Atatürk High School (formerly the Central School for Girls), built by P. Karathanasopoulos (1909–1912)

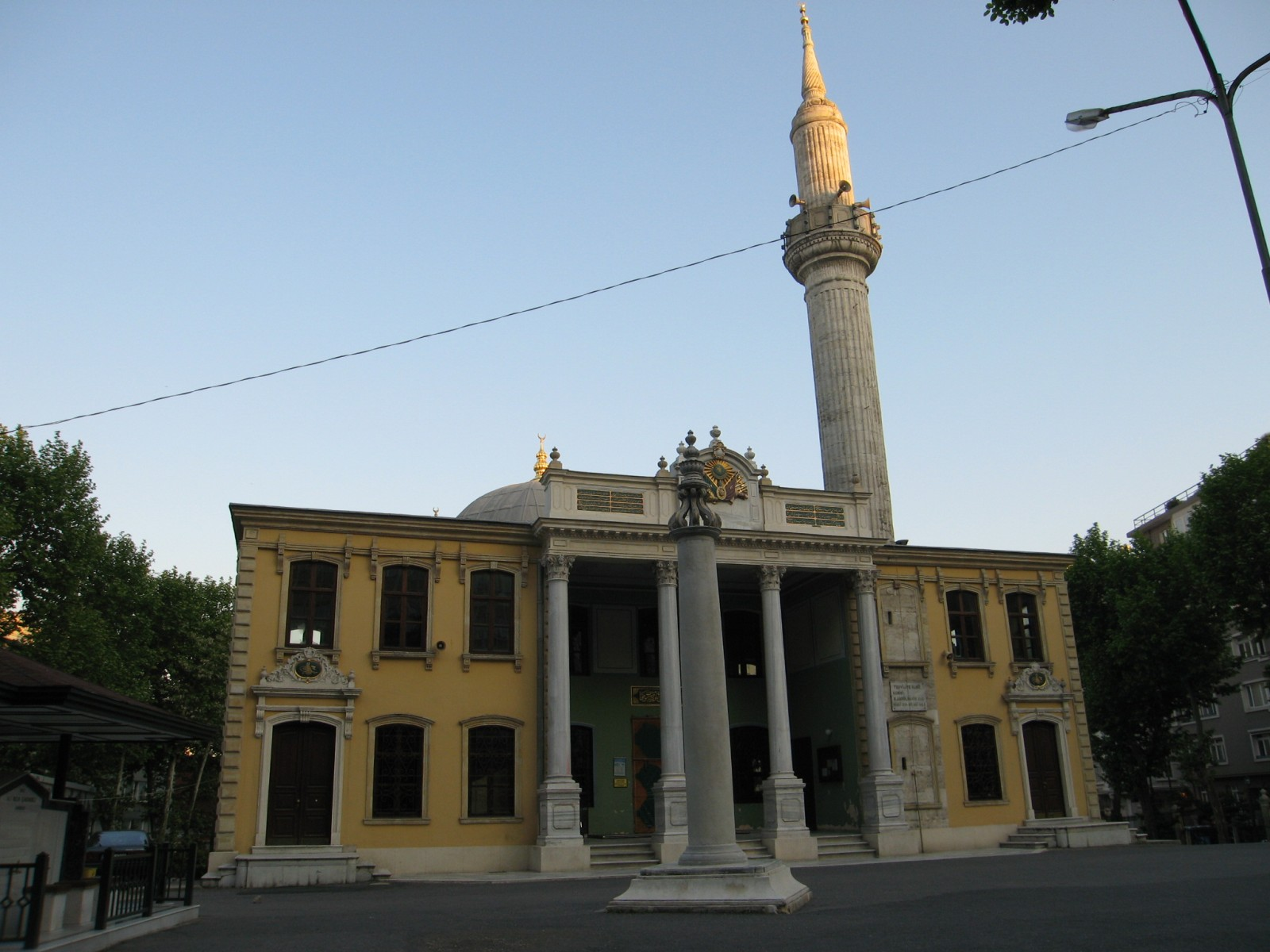
Teşvikiye Mosque, designed by Krikor Balyan (1854).

By the start of the early 20th century, rising nationalism, a growing sense of cultural identity and political reform led to the development of the First national architectural movement (Turkish: Birinci Ulusal Mimarlık Akımı). This movement, also known as the National architecture renaissance (Turkish: Millî Mimari Rönesansı), Turkish neoclassical architecture (Turkish: Neoklasik Türk Üslûbu), or Neo-Ottoman architecture represented a shift away from European Neoclassicism, and lean more toward architectural forms inspired by the Ottoman and Seljuk styles that preceded it, it was promoted by architects such as Mimar Kemaleddin Bey, Vedat Tek and Turkish Levantine architect Giulio Mongeri. Examples include the Istanbul Grand Post Office (1908), Bulgur Palas (1912), and the Ankara State Art and Sculpture Museum (1930). The First National Architectural Movement continued after the Turkish War of Independence (1919–1922) and establishment of the Republic of Turkey, remaining influential until the early 1930s. It gradually declined as modernist styles such as Art Deco, Bauhaus and Stripped Classicism started being adopted, eventually giving rise to the Second national architectural movement (Turkish: İkinci Ulusal Mimarlık Akımı).

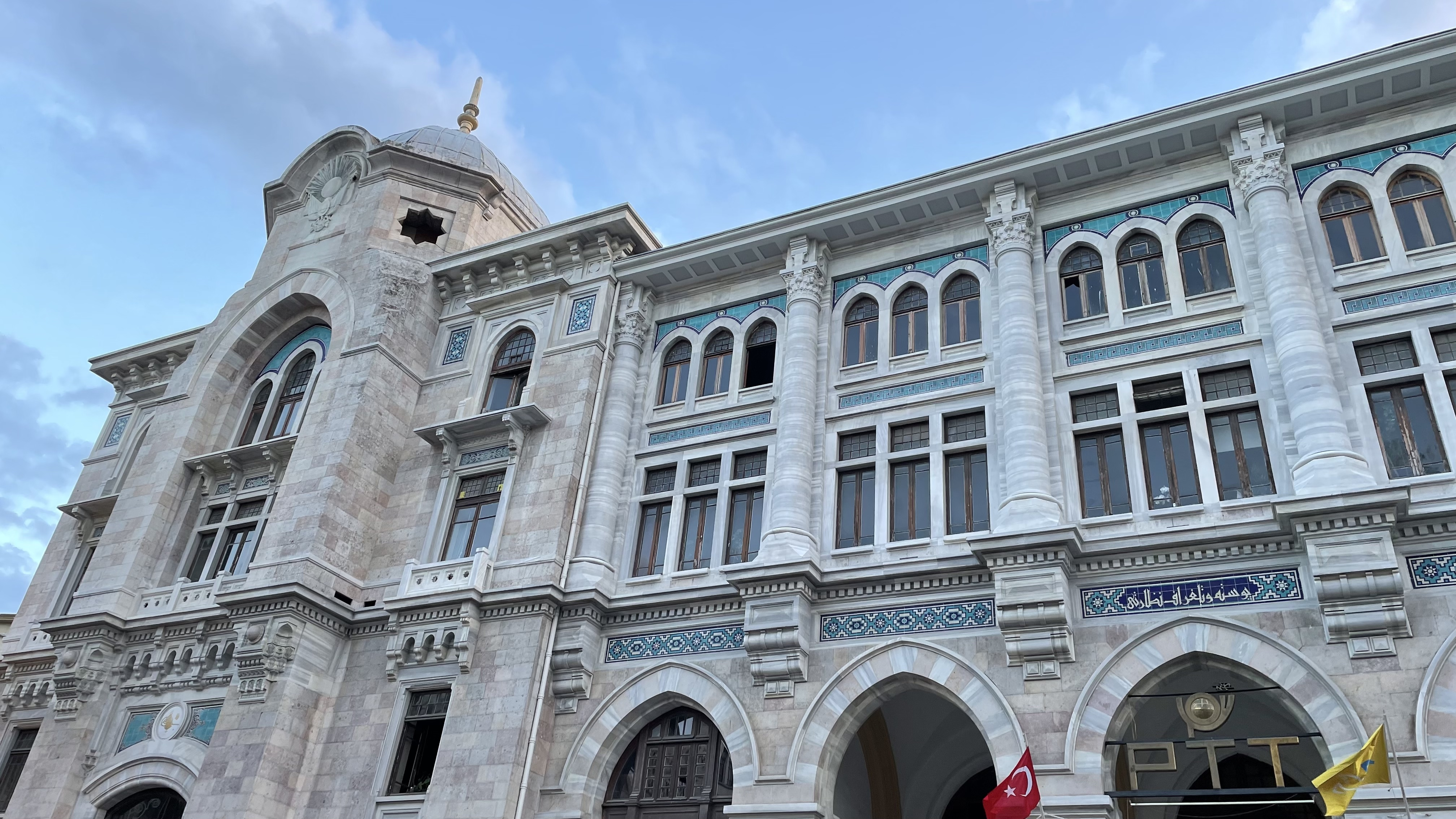
Istanbul Grand Post Office, designed by Vedat Tek (built between 1905–1908)

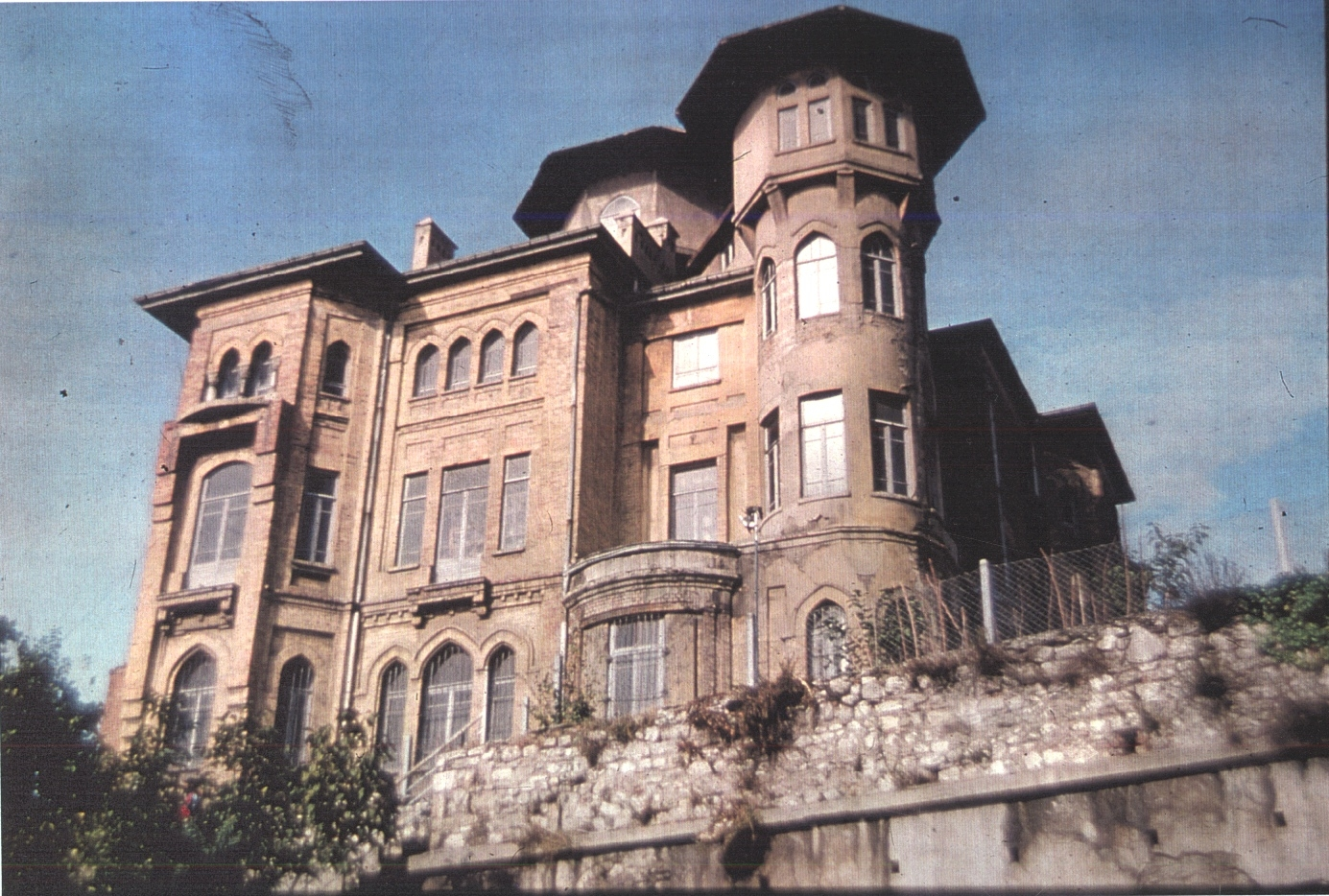
Bulgur Palas, designed by Alessandro Valeri (1912)

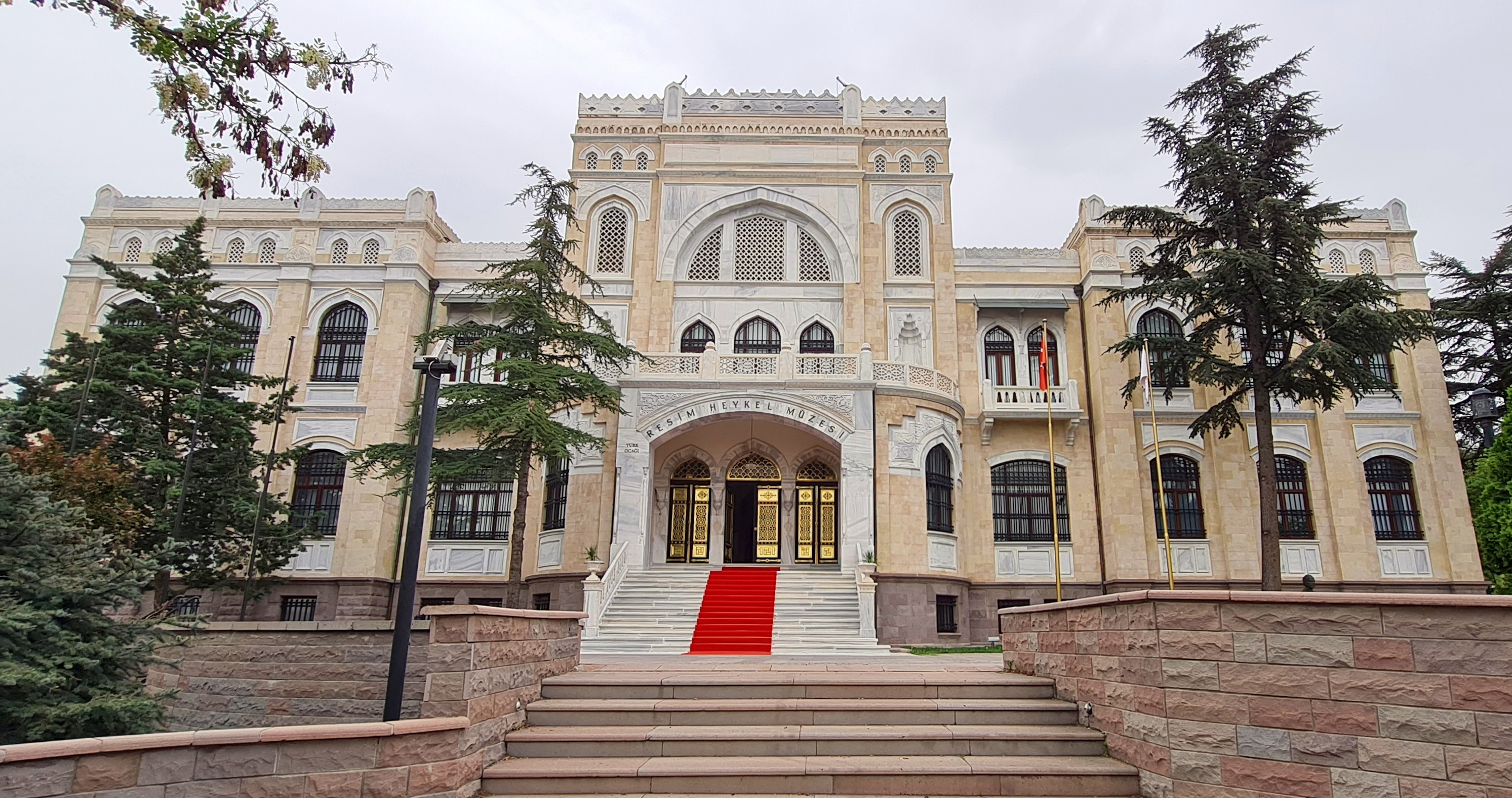
Ankara State Art and Sculpture Museum, designed by Arif Hikmet Koyunoğlu (1927)

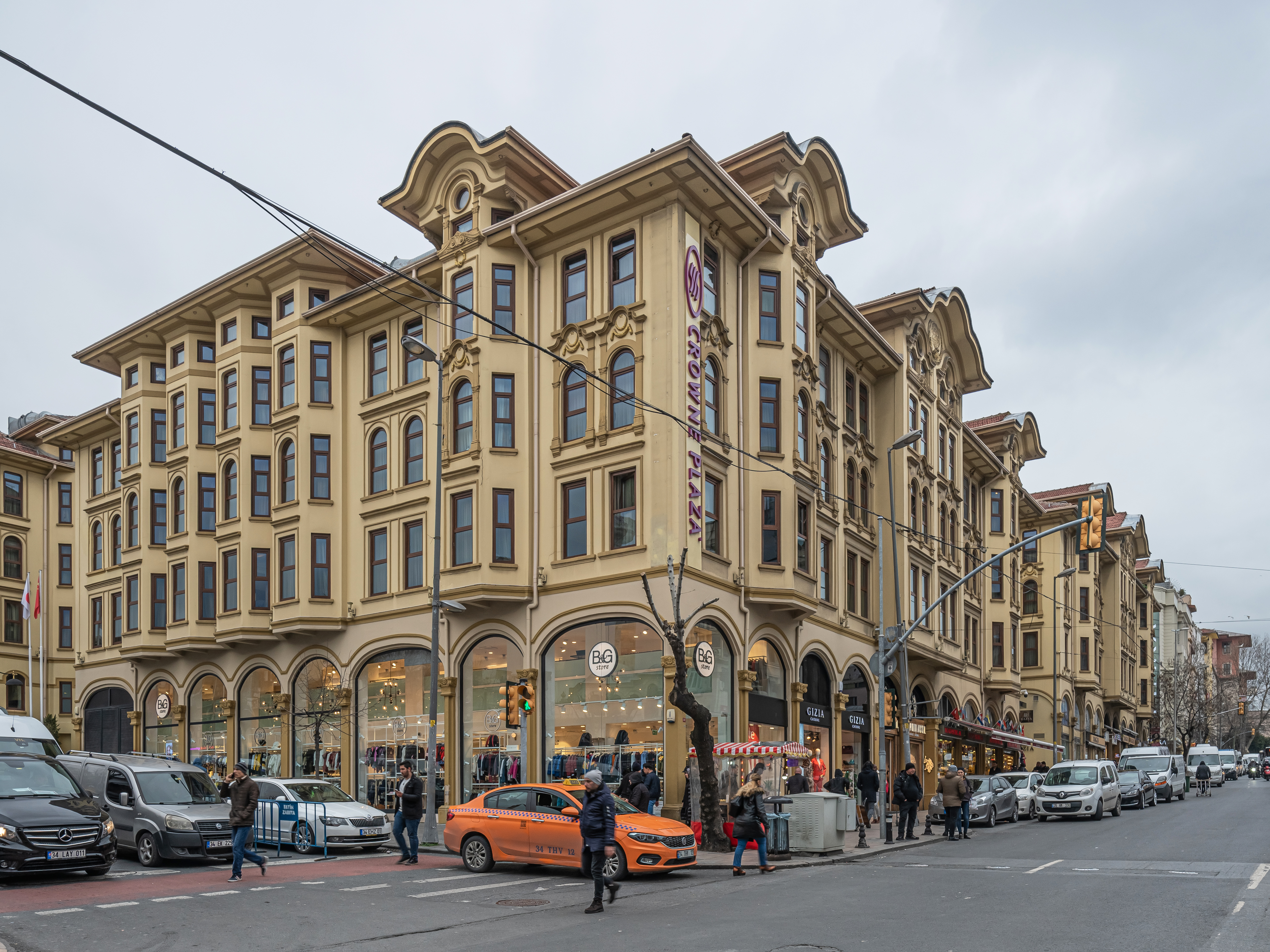
Tayyare Apartments, designed by Mimar Kemaleddin Bey (1922)

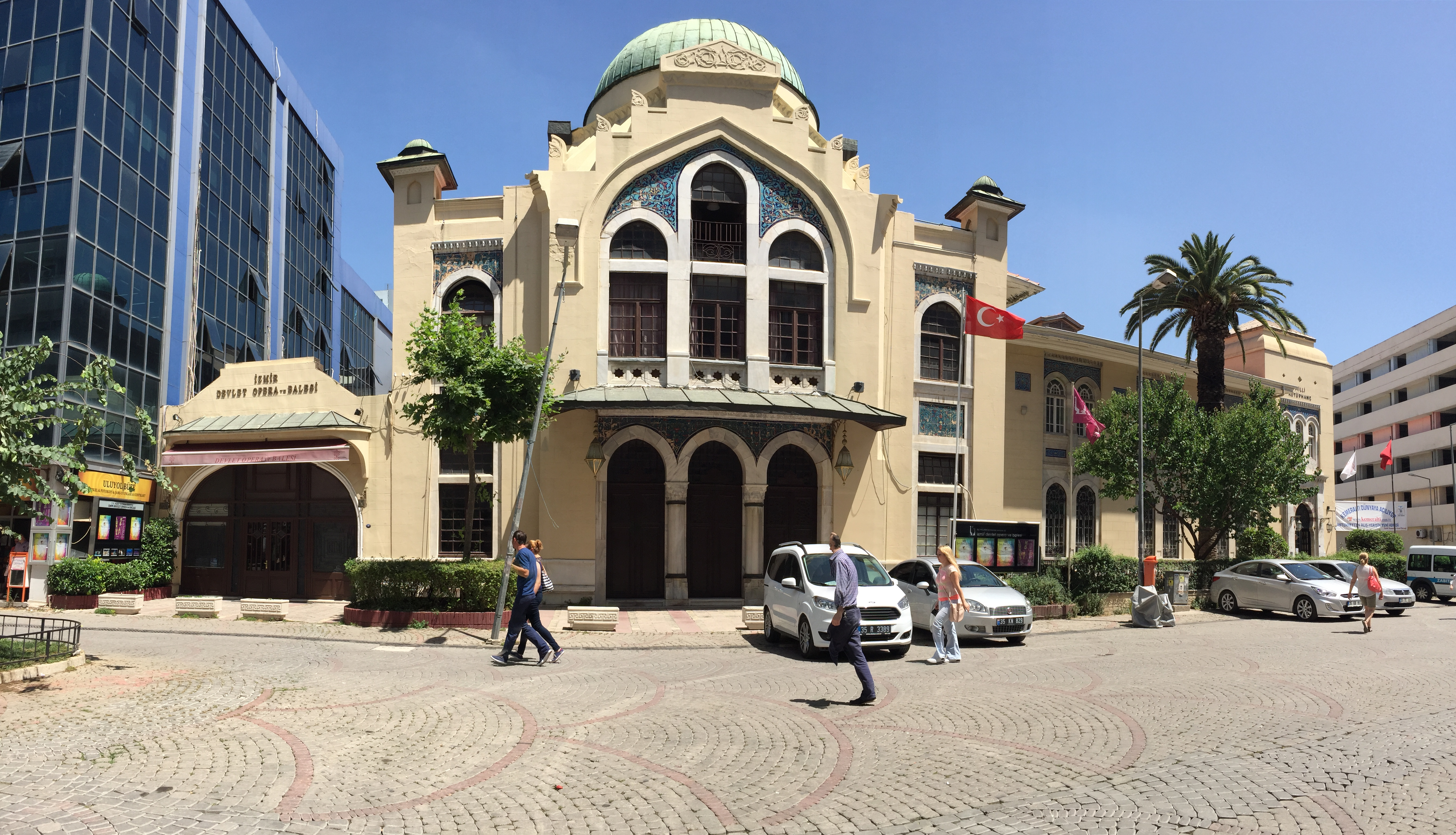
Elhamra Theater, designed by Tahsin Sermet (1912)

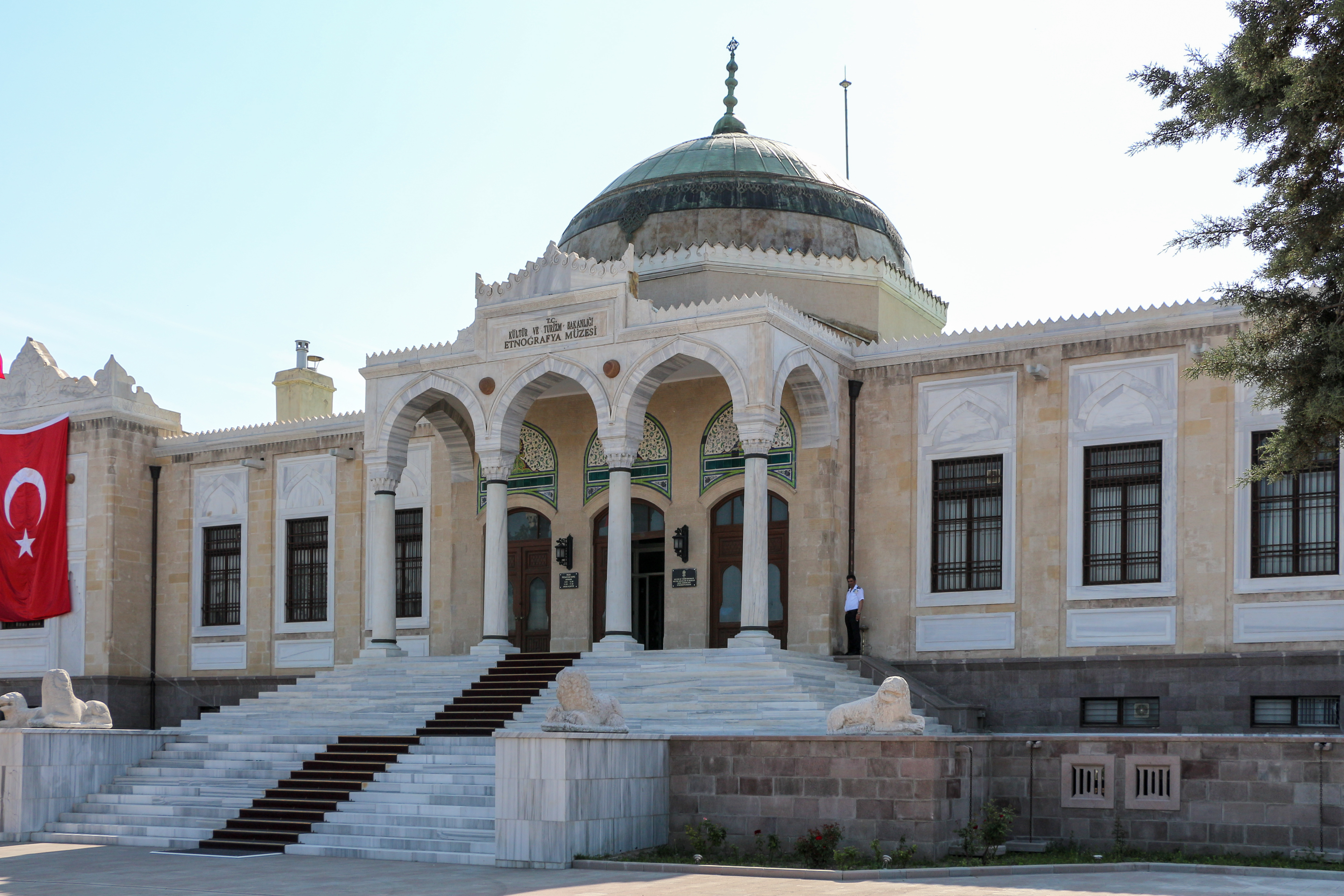
Ankara Ethnography Museum, designed by Arif Hikmet Koyunoğlu (built between 1925–1928)

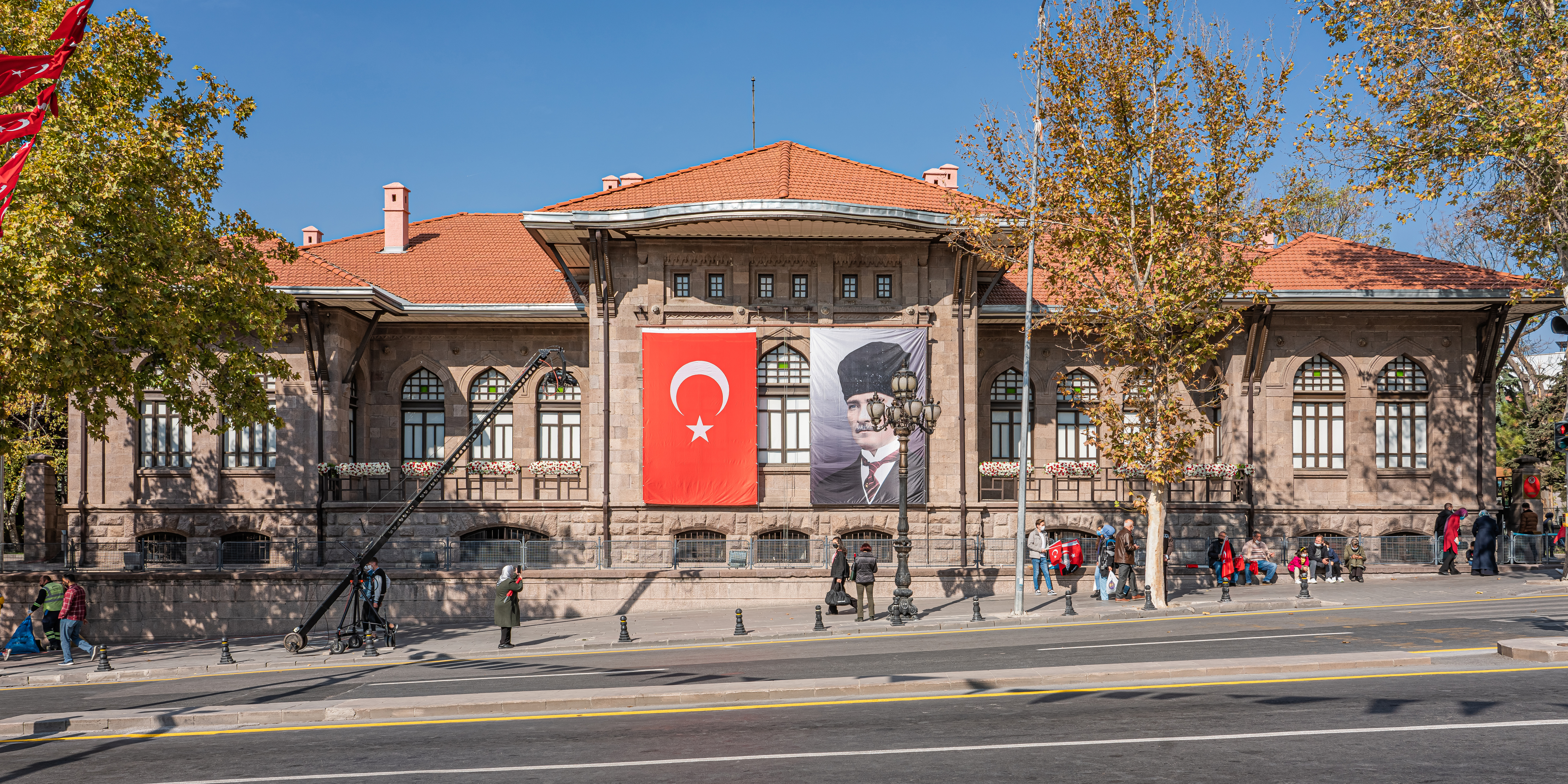
I. Grand National Assembly Building (also known as the War of Independence Museum), designed by Salim Bey (1920)

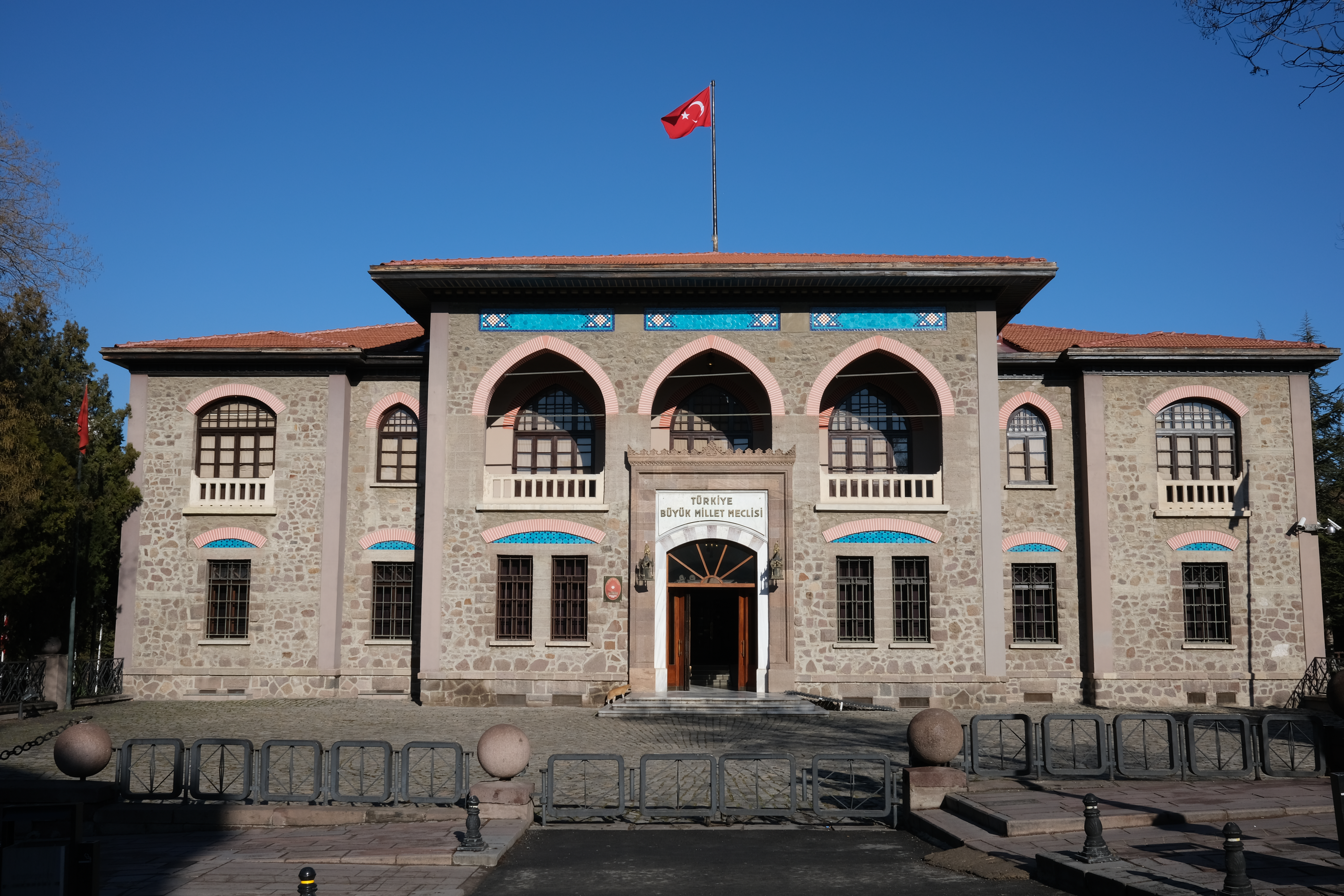
II. Grand National Assembly Building (also known as the Republic Museum), designed by Vedat Tek (1924)

=== Japan ===
Although not a western country, due to Western influence Japan has had neoclassical architecture produced in it. This includes the unique Hiko Shrine, which is a Shinto shrine modelled Greek temples. It later developed into the Imperial Crown Style, which contains elements of both Eastern and Western design. Roofs are notably distinctly Asian in this style, and it was used heavily by the Japanese Empire in its colonies.

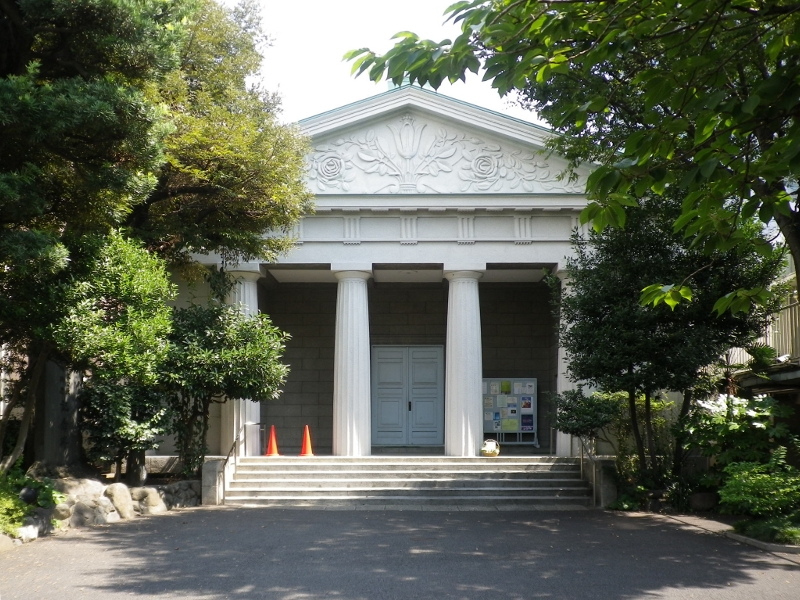
Old Cathedral of St. Joseph, Tokyo (1878)

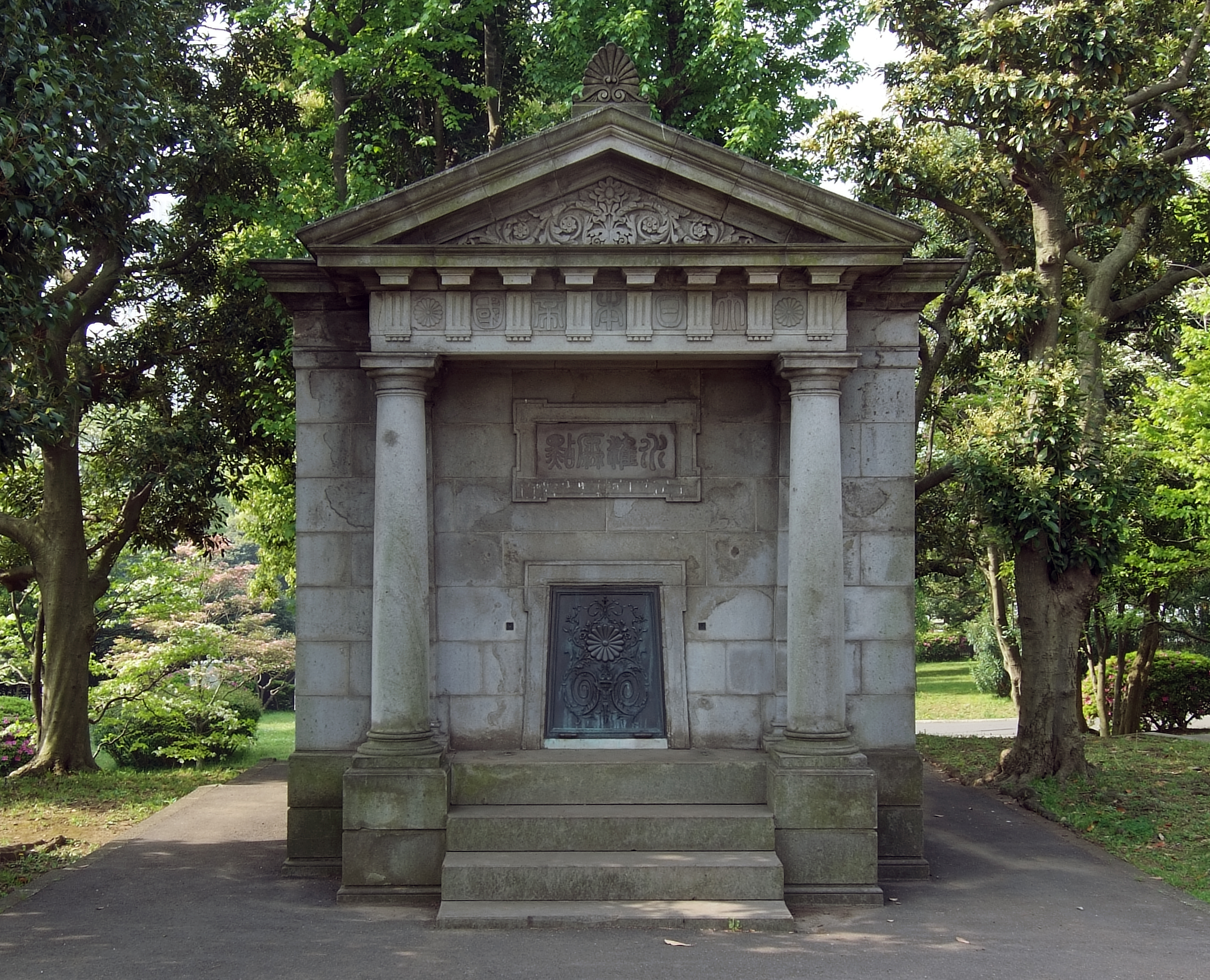
Japanese water height reference point (1891)

Nara National Museum (1894)

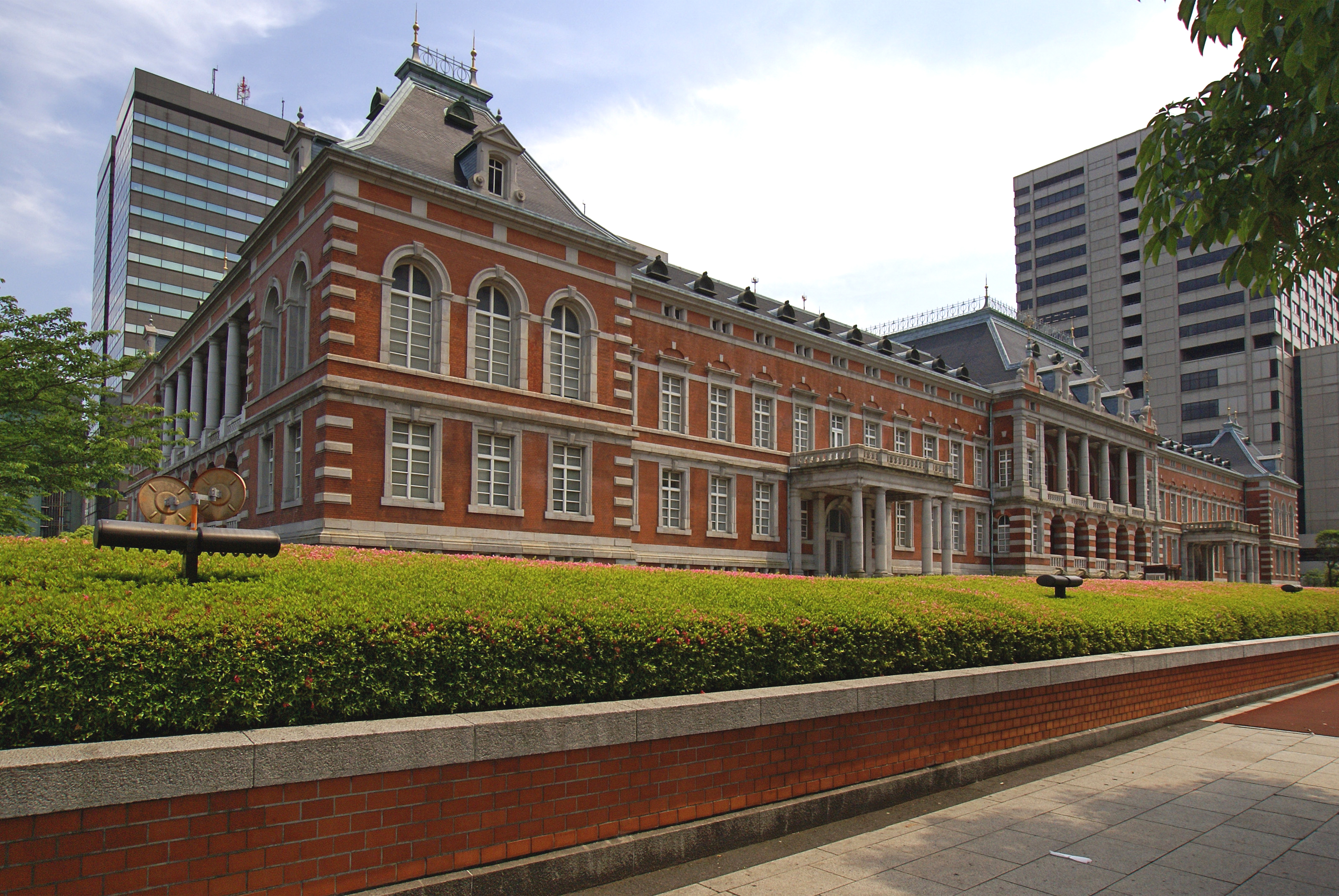
Ministry of Justice of Japan (1895)

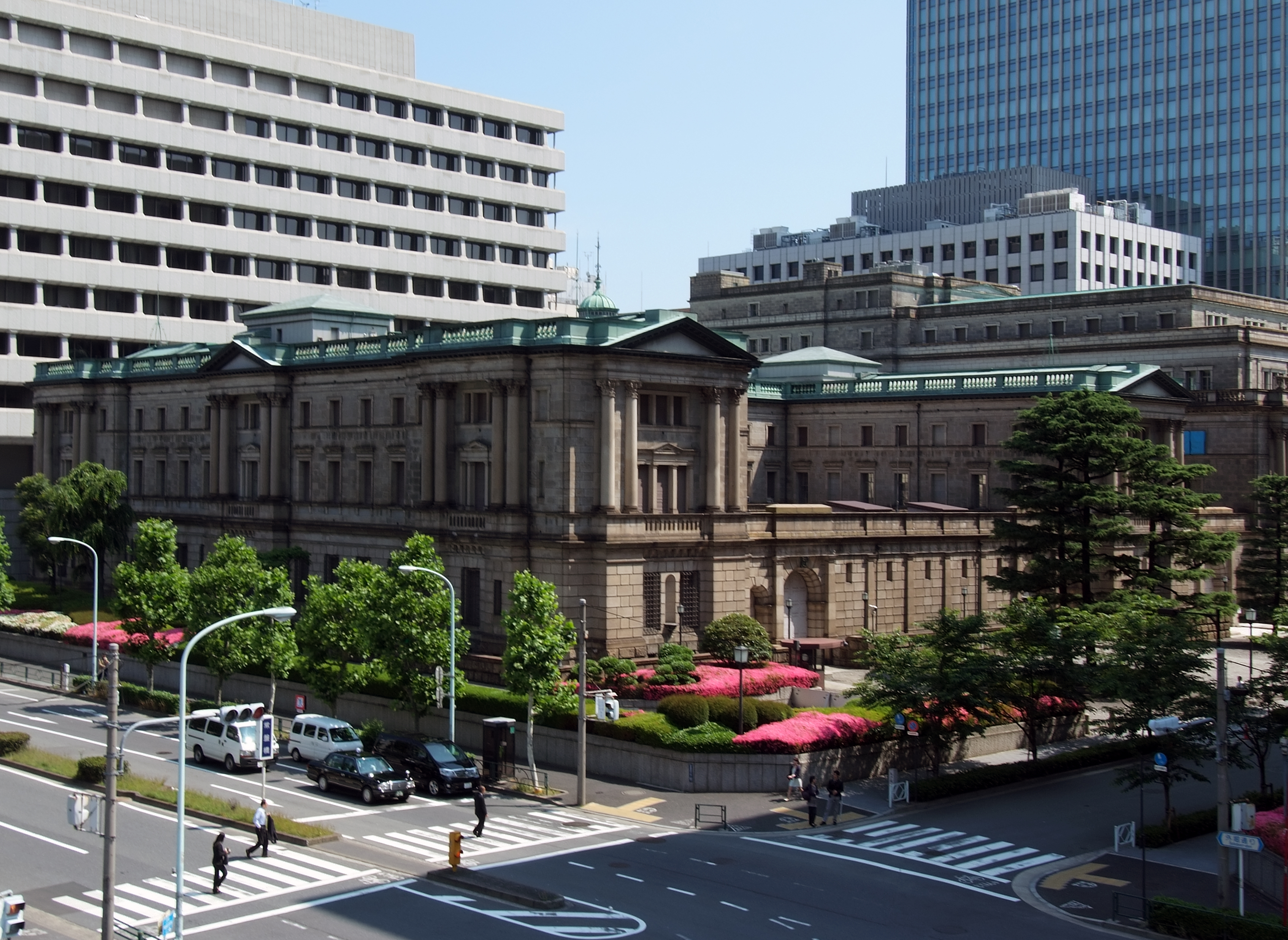
Bank of Japan (1896)

Kyoto National Museum (1897)

Osaka Prefectural Nakanoshima Library (1904)

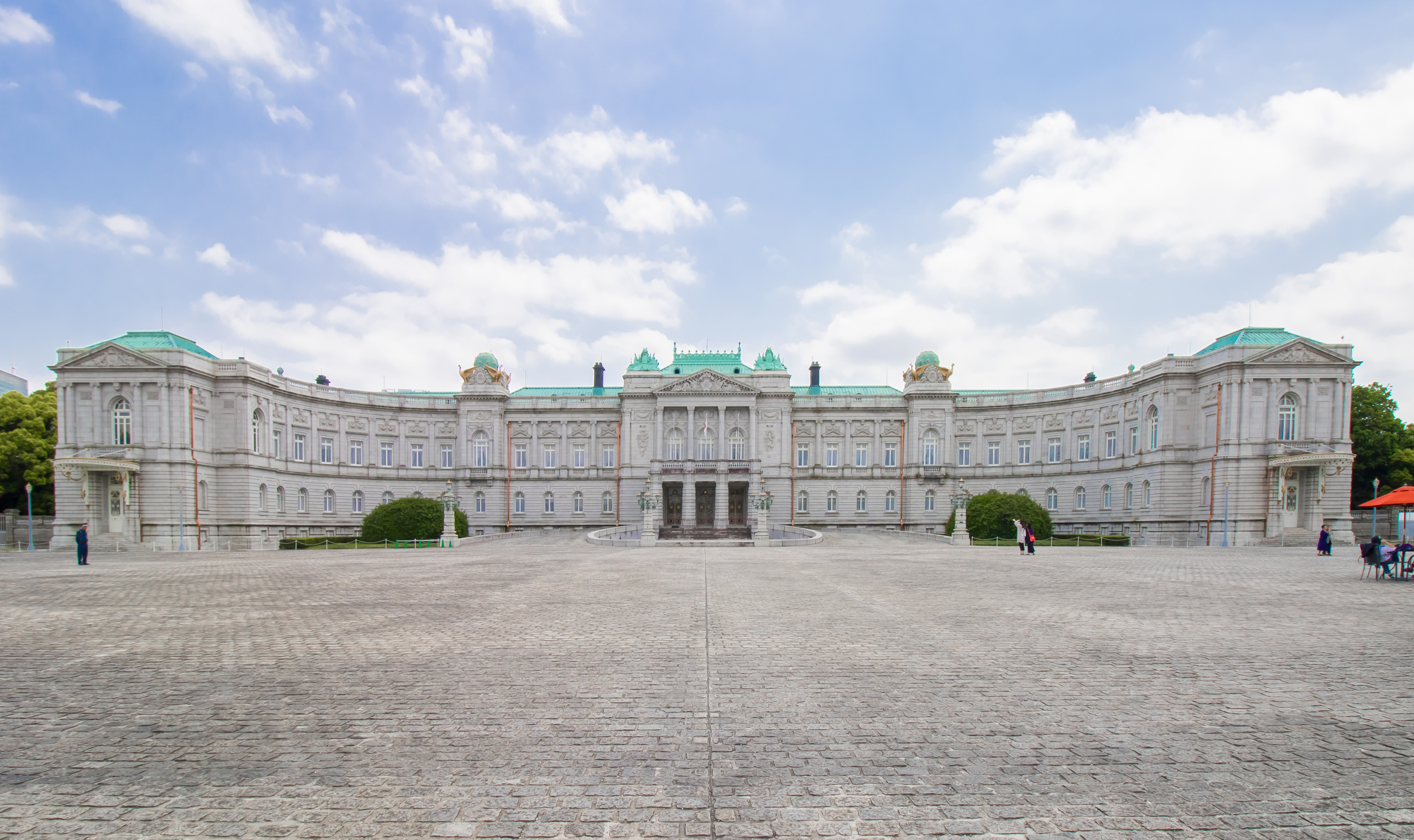
Akasaka Palace (1909)

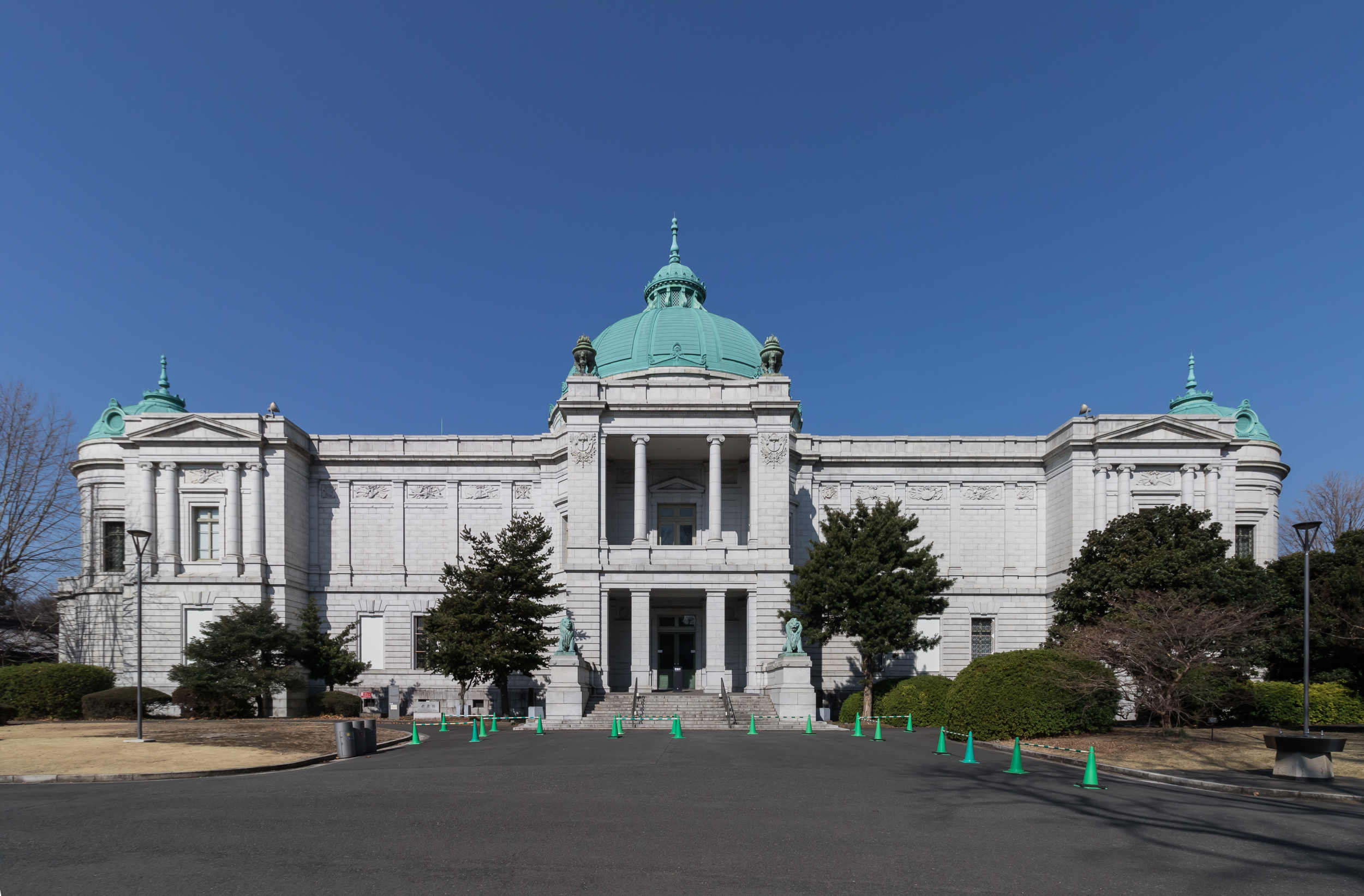
Tokyo National Museum Hyokeikan wing (1909)

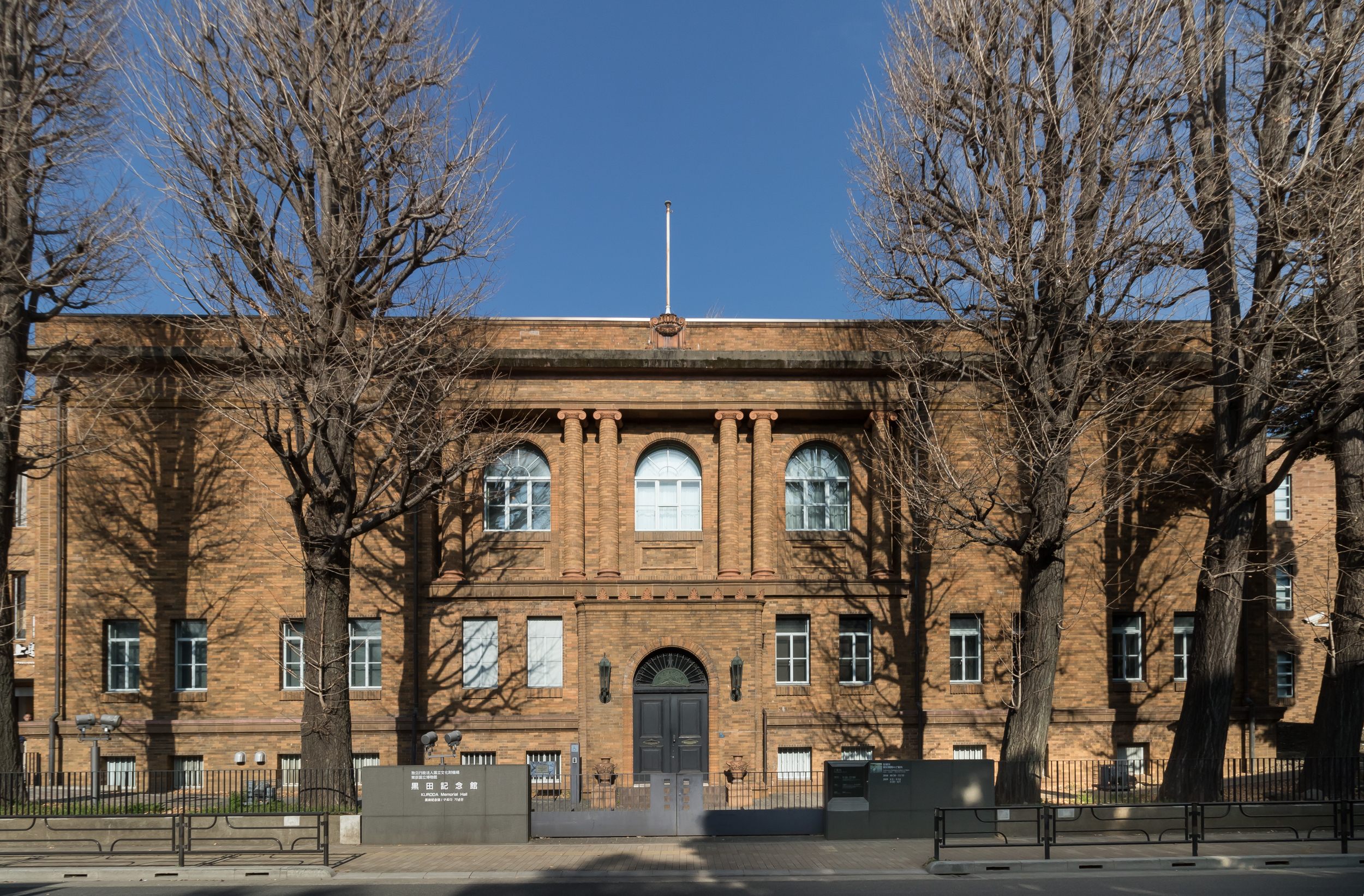
Tokyo National Museum Kuroda Memorial Hall (1928)

Tokyo Station (1914)

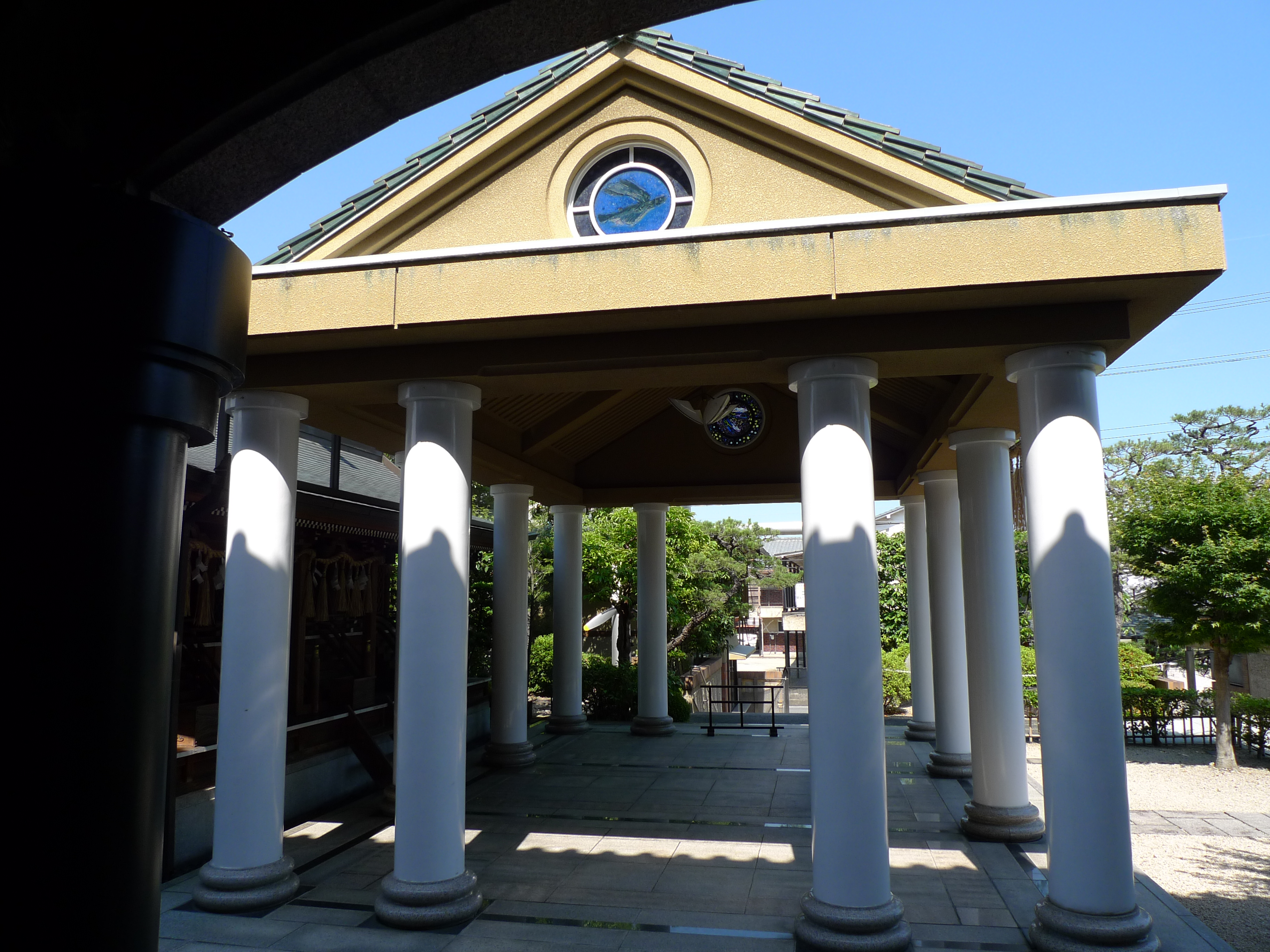
Hiko Shrine (1915)

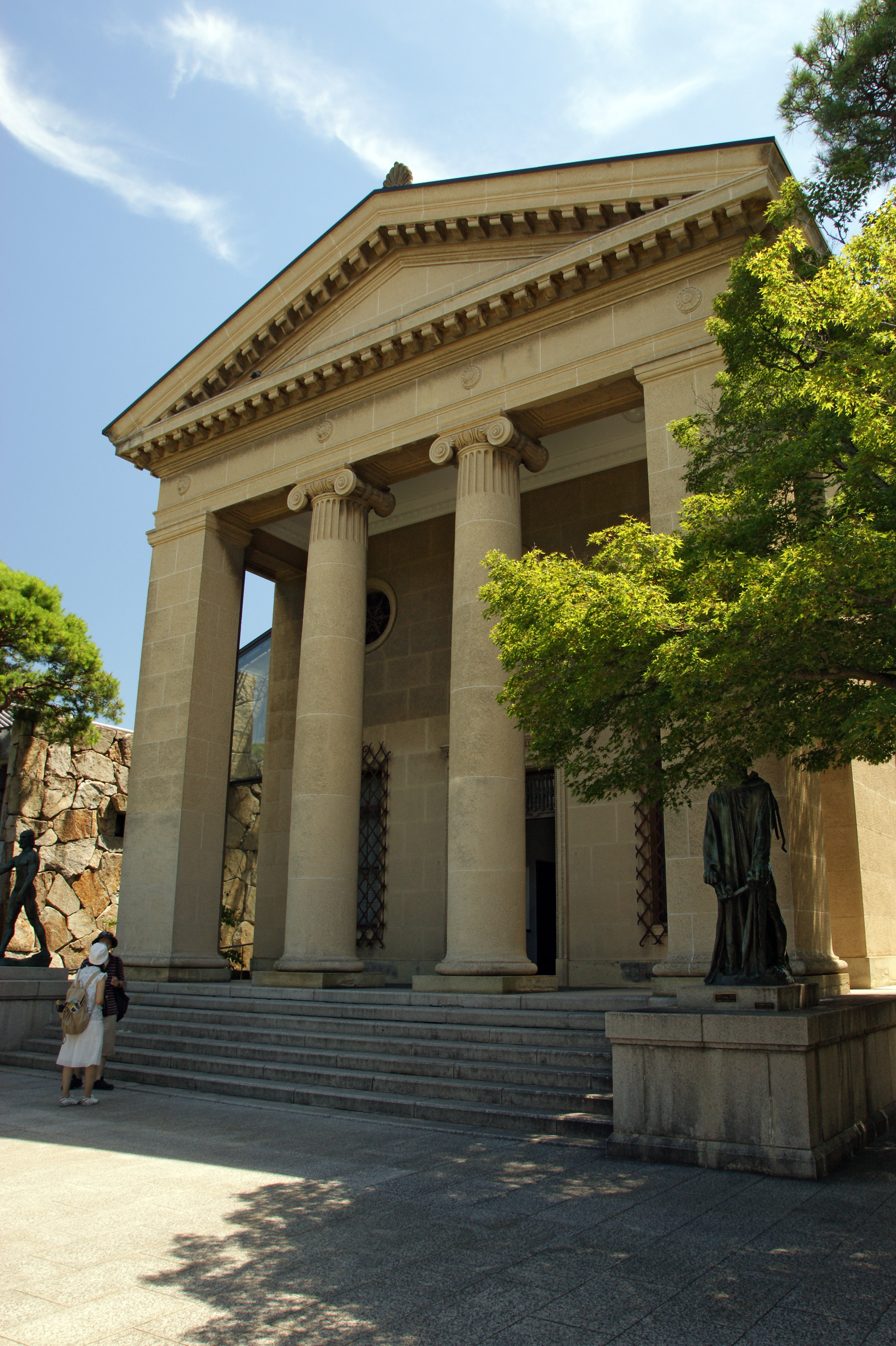
Ohara Museum of Art (1930)

Kodansha (1933)

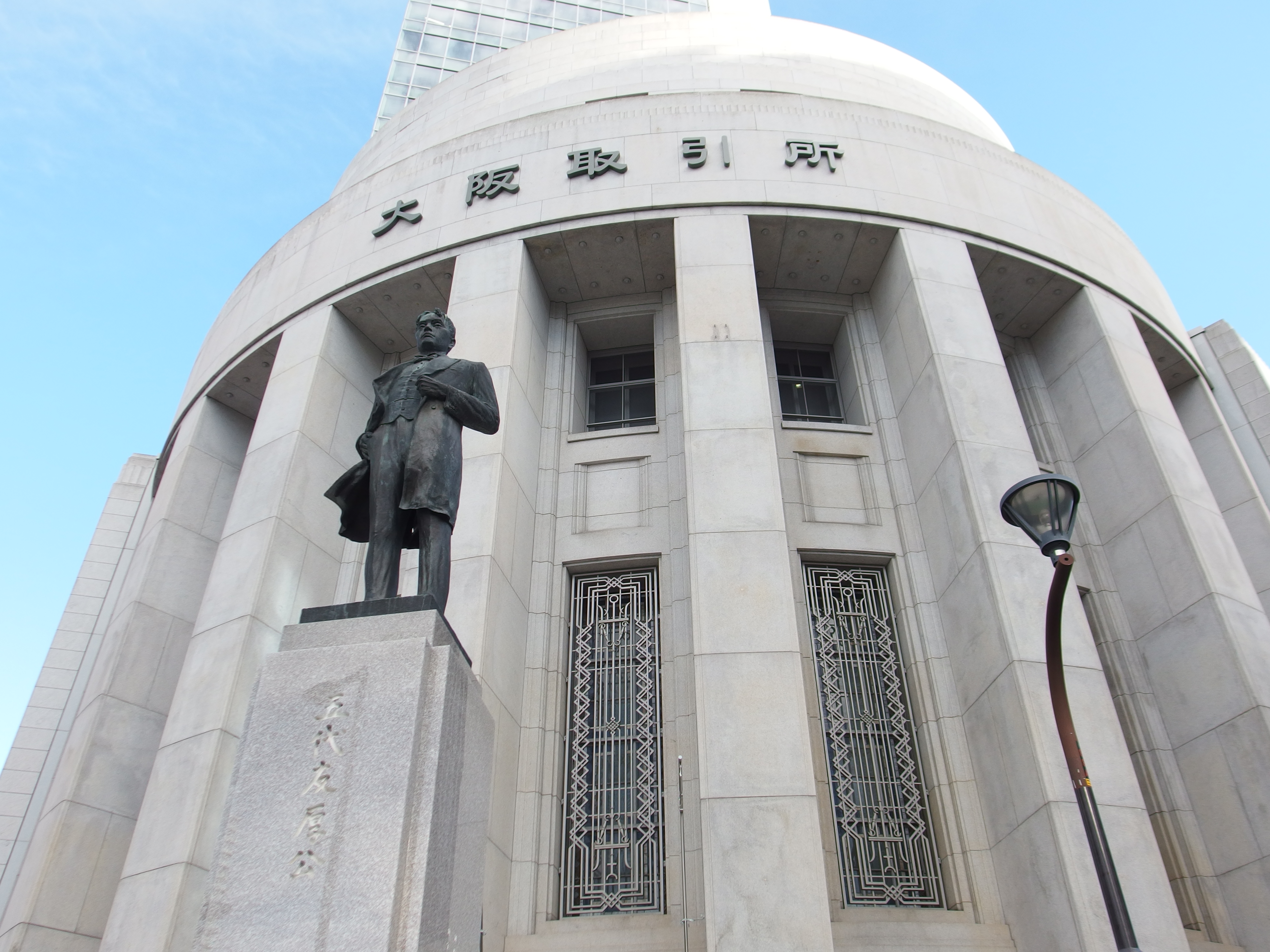
Osaka Exchange (1949)

=== Malta ===
Neoclassical architecture was introduced in Malta in the late 18th century, during the final years of Hospitaller rule. Early examples include the Bibliotheca (1786), the De Rohan Arch (1798) and the Hompesch Gate (1801). However, neoclassical architecture only became popular in Malta following the establishment of British rule in the early 19th century. In 1814, a neoclassical portico decorated with the British coat of arms was added to the Main Guard building so as to serve as a symbol of British Malta. Other 19th-century neoclassical buildings include the Monument to Sir Alexander Ball (1810), RNH Bighi (1832), St Paul's Pro-Cathedral (1844), the Rotunda of Mosta (1860) and the now-destroyed Royal Opera House, Valletta (1866).

Neoclassicism gave way to other architectural styles by the late 19th century. Few buildings were built in the neoclassical style during the 20th century, such as the Domvs Romana museum (1922), and the Courts of Justice building (Valletta) (1965–1971).

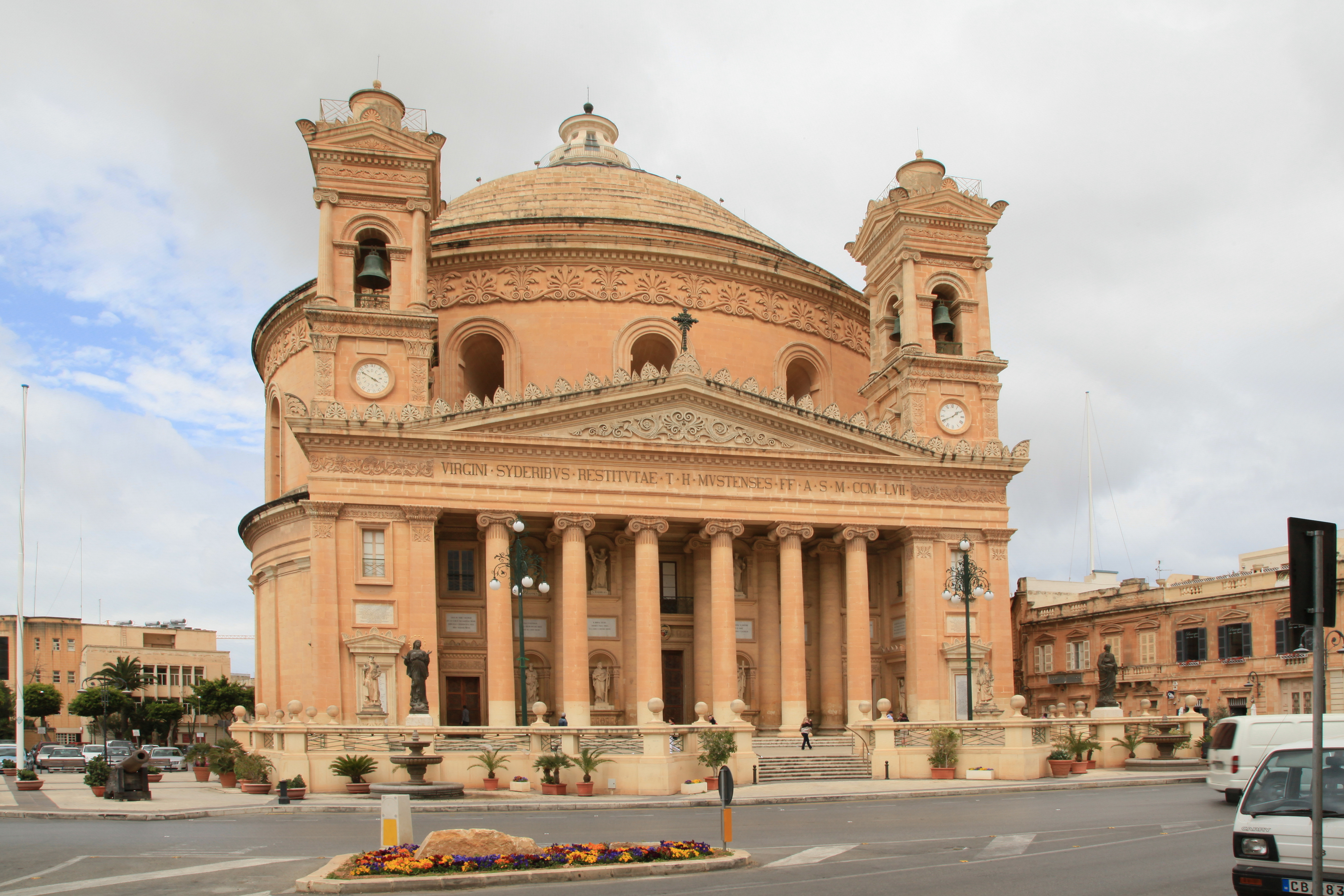
Rotunda of Mosta, built between 1833 and 1860

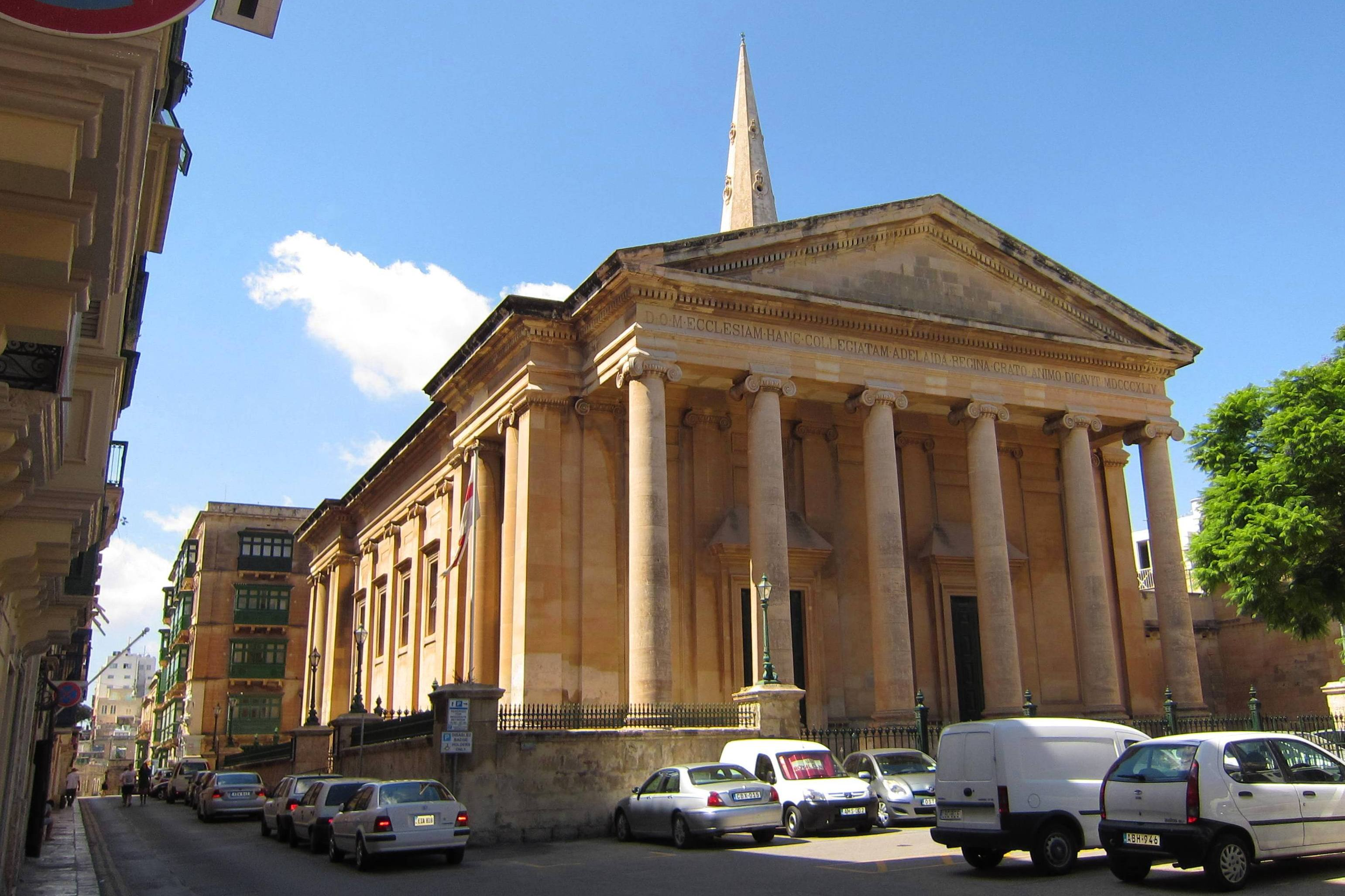
St Paul's Pro-Cathedral, Valletta, built between 1839 and 1844

=== Mexico ===
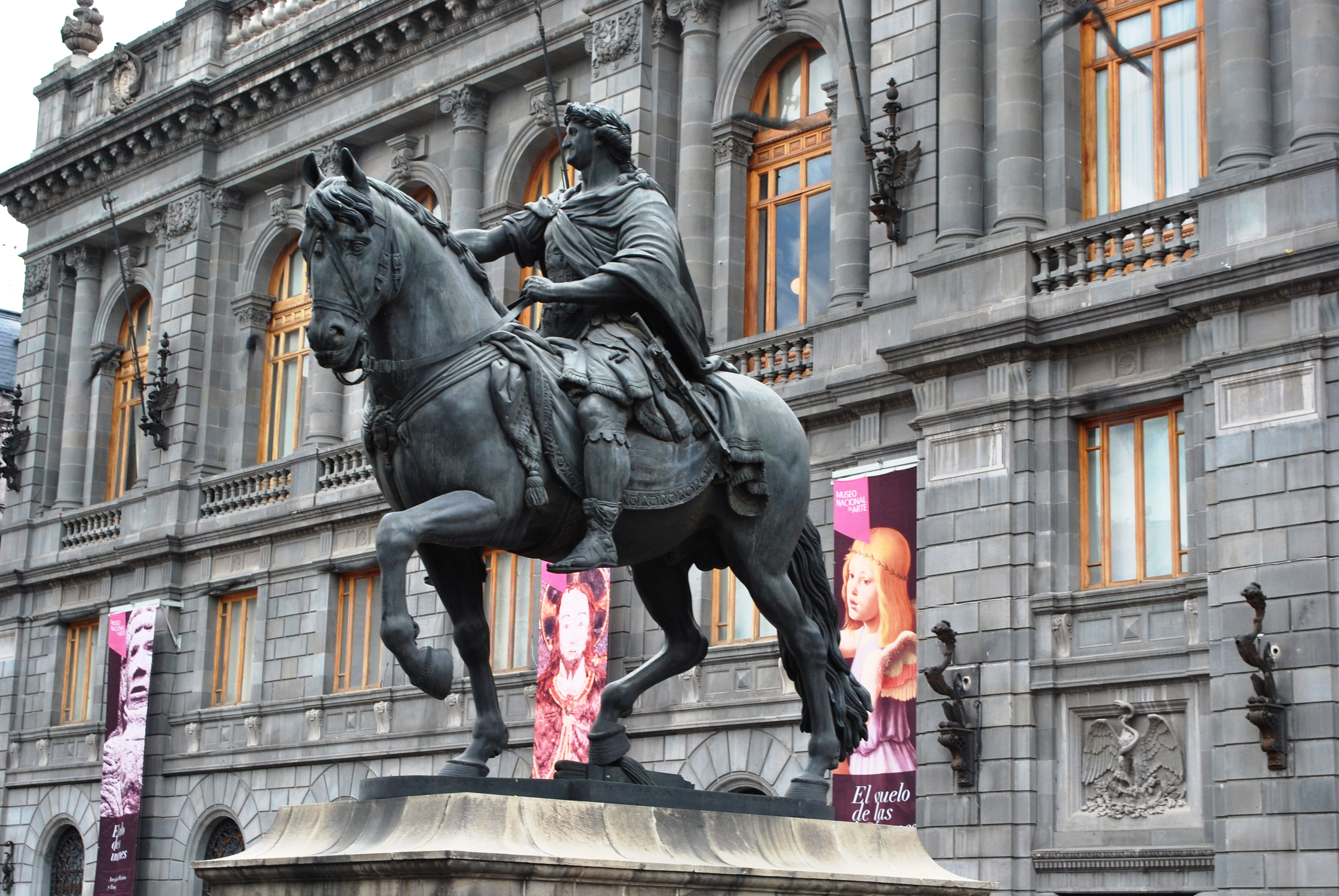
An equestrian statue by Manuel Tolsá in the Plaza Manuel Tolsá, Historic Center of Mexico City.

Neoclassical architecture in Mexico had two main eras, the first was toward the end of Spanish viceregal era and the second phase was during independent Mexico beginning in the mid-19th century.

==== Viceregal Mexico ====
As part of the Spanish Enlightenment's cultural impact on the Kingdom of New Spain (Mexico), the crown established the Academy of San Carlos in 1785 to train painters, sculptors, and architects in New Spain, under the direction of the peninsular Gerónimo Antonio Gil. The academy emphasized neoclassicism, which drew on the inspiration of the clean lines of Greek and Roman architecture, but also, for some monuments, from the Aztec and Maya architectural traditions. The preeminent Neoclassical architect in Mexico was Manuel Tolsá.

Neoclassicism in Mexican architecture was directly linked to crown policies that sought to rein in the exuberance of the New Spanish Baroque, and to create public buildings of "good taste" funded by the crown, such as the Palacio de Minería in Mexico City, the Hospicio Cabañas in Guadalajara, and the Alhóndiga de Granaditas in Guanajuato, all built in the late colonial era.

The Mexico City Metropolitan Cathedral, begun in the 16th century, incorporates Neoclassical style primarily in its upper portions, particularly the bell towers and façade, which were completed in the late 18th and early 19th centuries by architects like Manuel Tolsá. While the lower sections are predominantly Baroque, the Neoclassical elements introduced by architects like Tolsá added a more restrained aesthetic and height with the incorporation of new domes and sculptures.

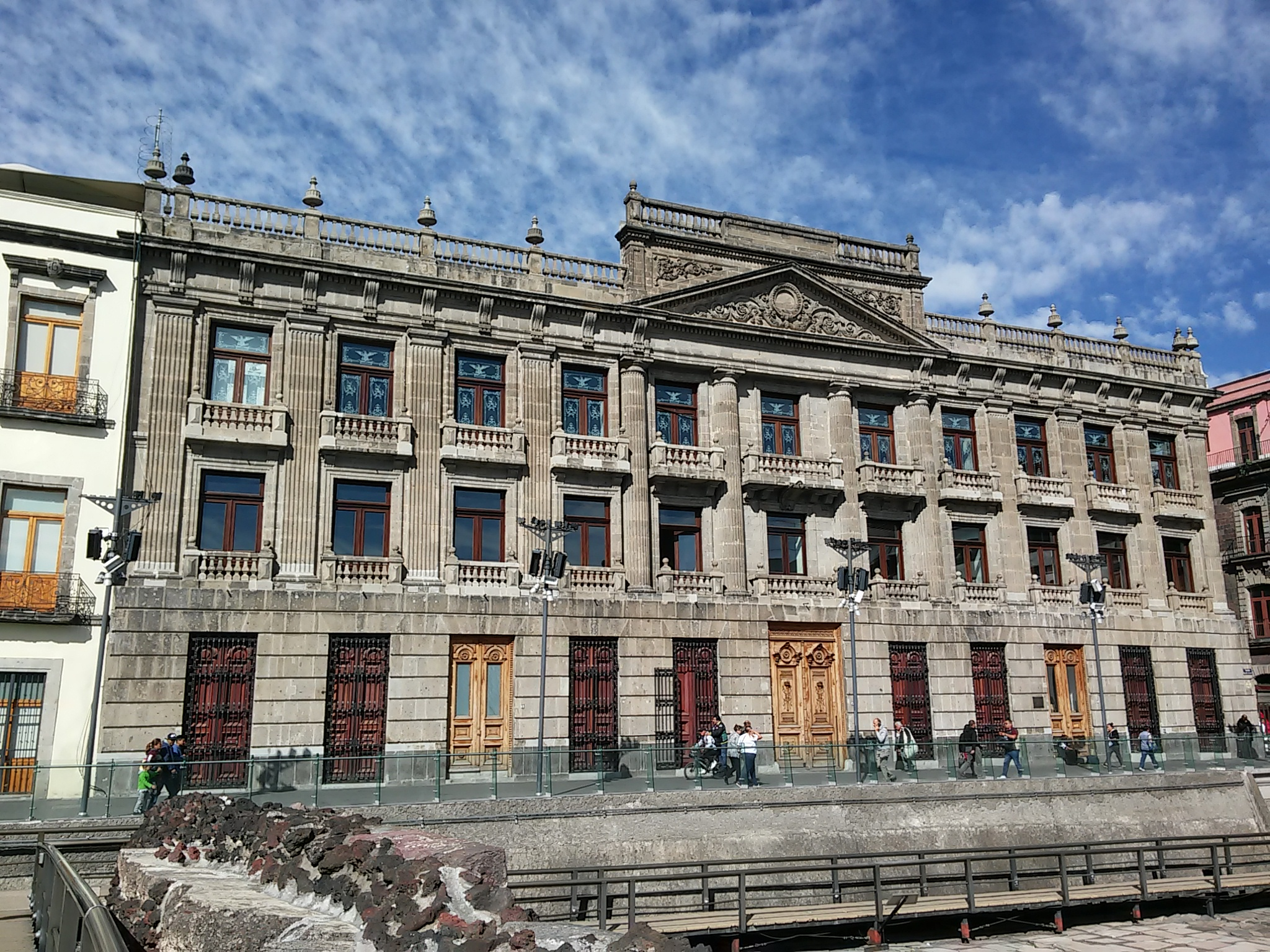
Palacio del Marqués del Apartado, Mexico City, by Manuel Tolsá (1795–1805)

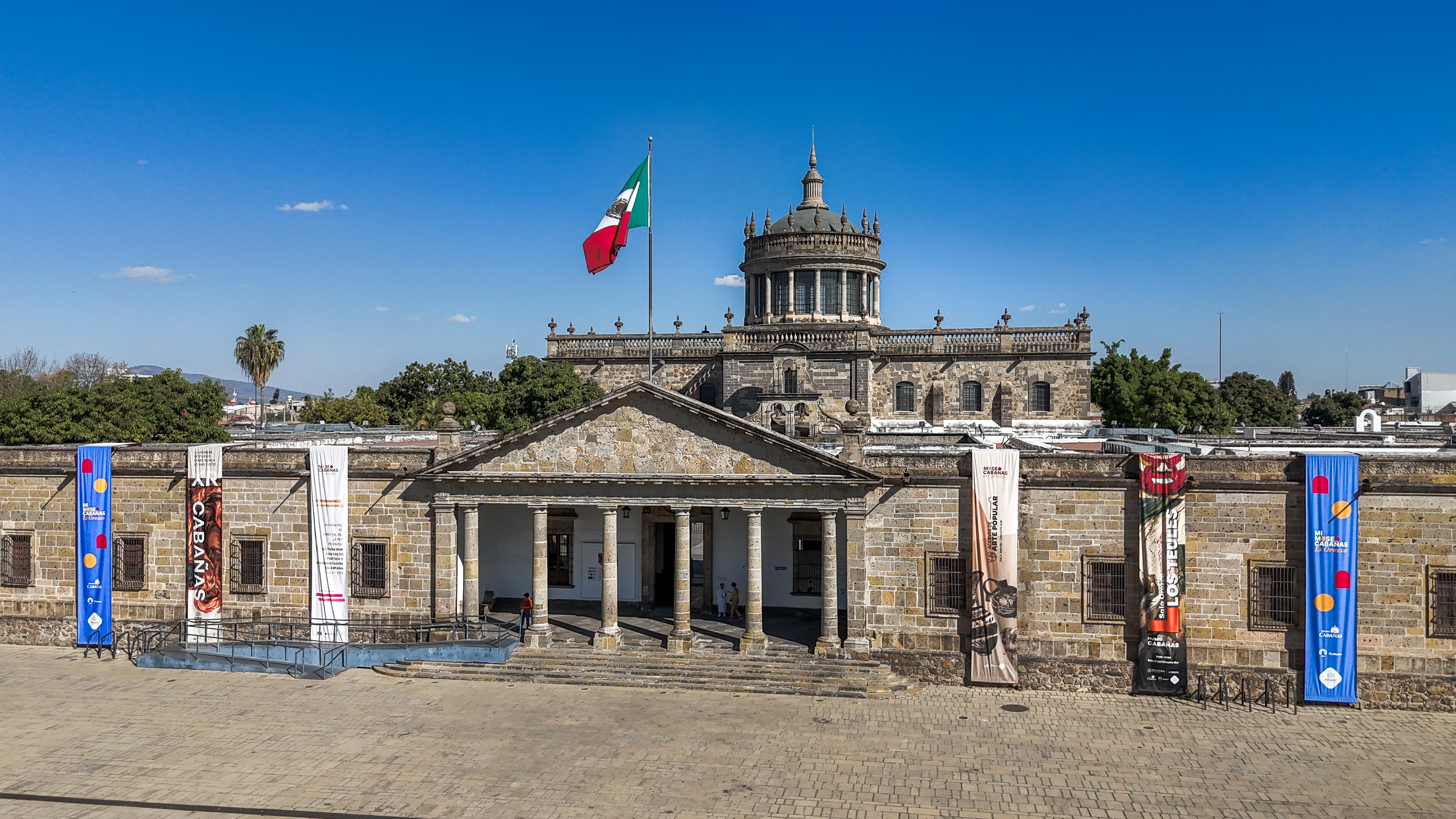
Hospicio Cabañas, Guadalajara, by Manuel Tolsá (1796–1810), one of the oldest and largest hospital complexes in the Americas

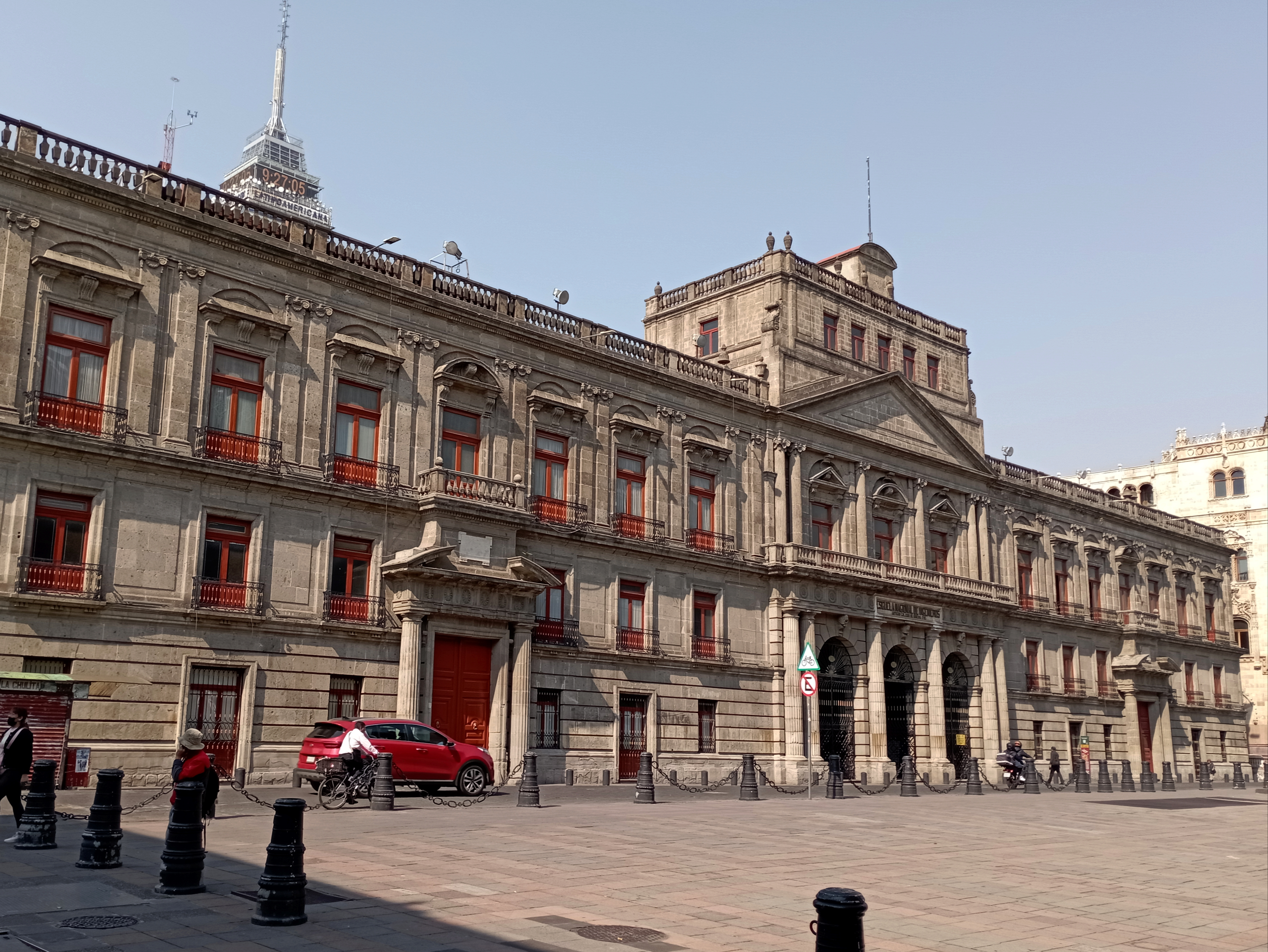
Palacio de Minería, Mexico City, by Manuel Tolsá (1797–1813)

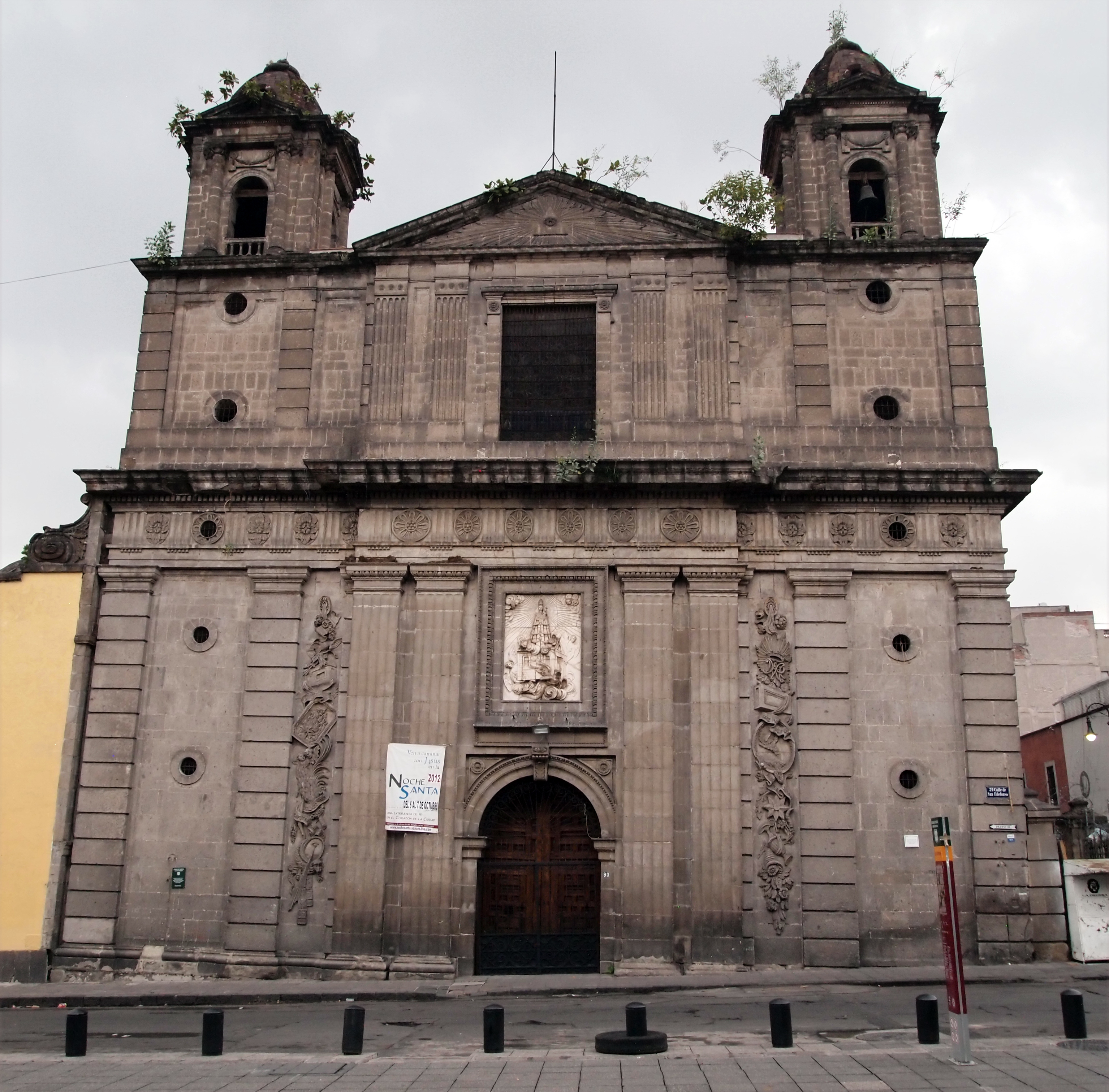
Nuestra Señora de Loreto Church, Mexico City, by Ignacio Castera y Agustín Paz (1806–1819), last church finished before consummation of Independence

==== Independent Mexico ====
Following Independence, the construction of major neoclassical buildings came to an end as a result of interruptions to the operation of the Academy of San Carlos and economic turmoil caused by the War of Independence. The economic slump was worsened by a succession of wars, including the Spanish reconquest attempts, First French Intervention, First American Intervention, Reform War, followed by the subsequent Second Mexican Empire. It was not until the late 1860s, with the restoration of the Republic and the subsequent stability of the Pax Porfiriana that Mexico saw a significant number of new neoclassical buildings. The Academy of San Carlos saw a renewal of neoclassicism ideals under director Francesco Saverio Cavallari.

During the Porfiriato, the predominant architectural taste favored Eclecticism. Buildings and monuments such as the Teatro Juárez, Museo Nacional de Arte, Palacio de Bellas Artes, and the Monument to Cuauhtémoc are 19th century eclectic buildings that combine different architectural styles, such as the Neoindigenismo, and are not solely neoclassical, especially in the European sense.

An important unfinished neoclassical building was the planned Palacio Legislativo Federal by Émile Bénard. Construction was halted by the Mexican Revolution and it was eventually turned into the Monumento a la Revolución.

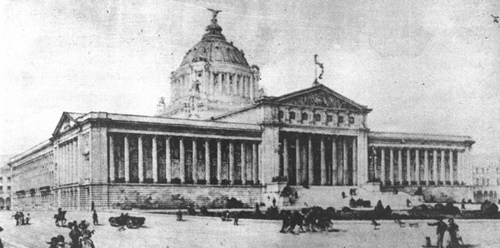
The drawings for the unfinished Palacio Legislativo Federal by Émile Bénard

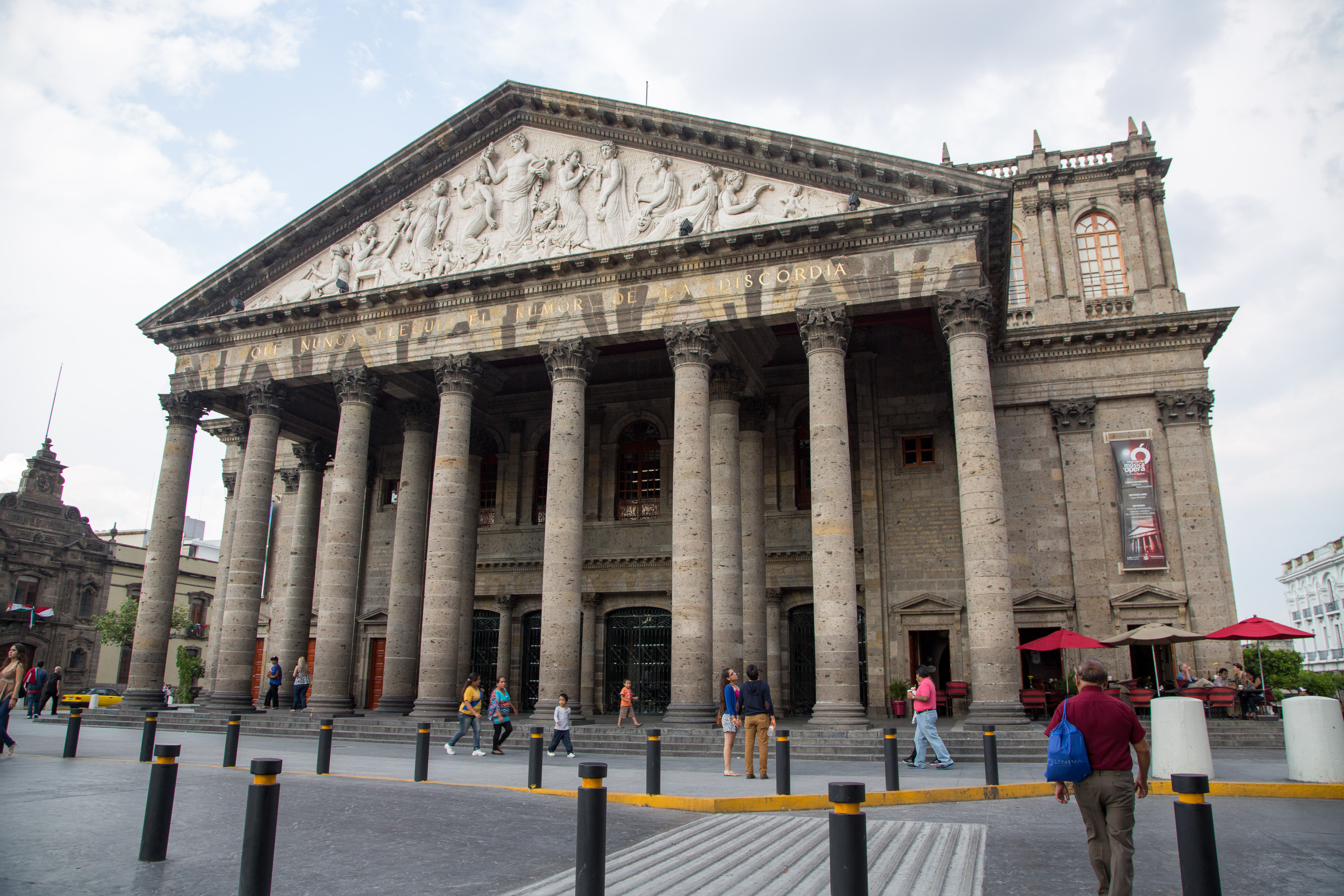
Degollado Theater, Guadalajara, by Jacobo Gálvez, (1856–1866)

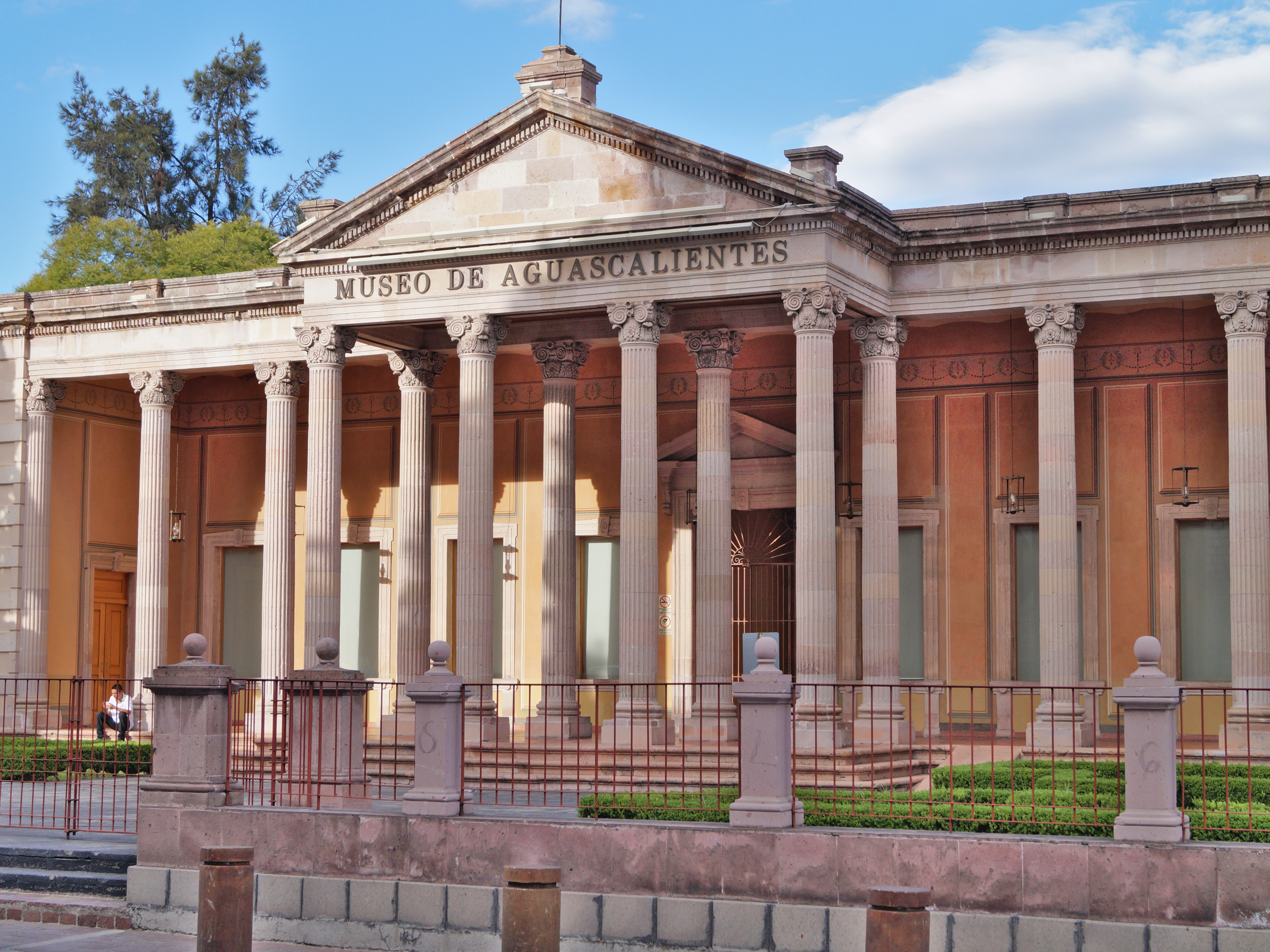
Aguascalientes Museum, Aguascalientes City, by Refugio Reyes Rivas (1903)

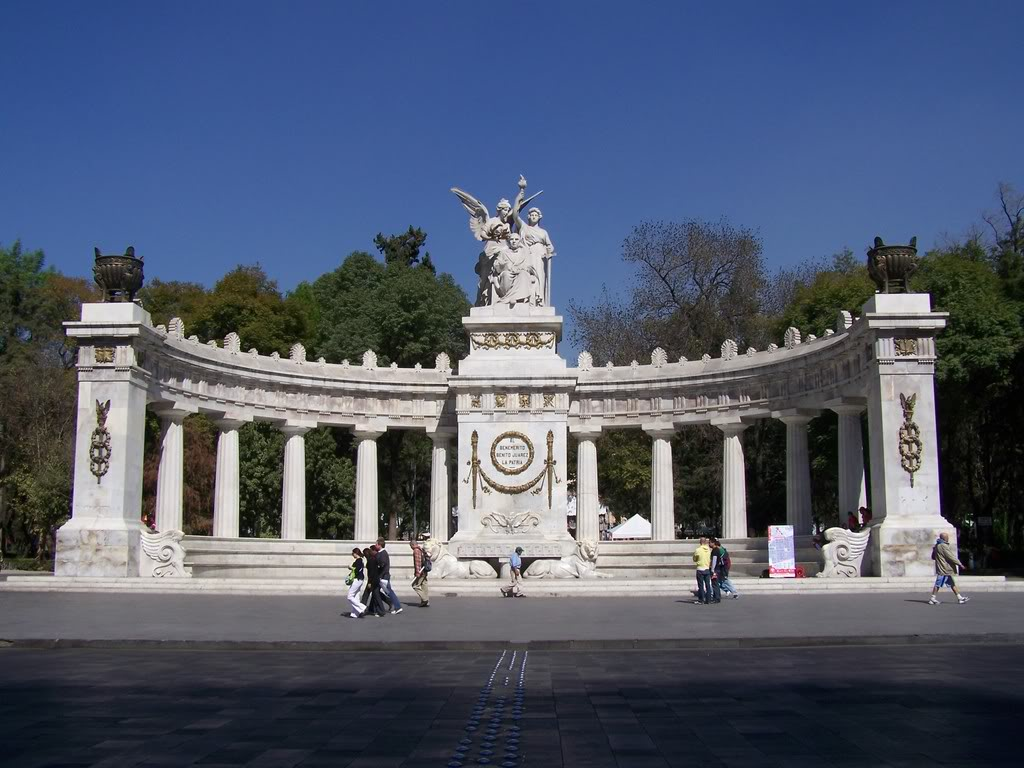
Benito Juárez Hemicycle, Mexico City, by Guillermo Heredia (1906–1910)

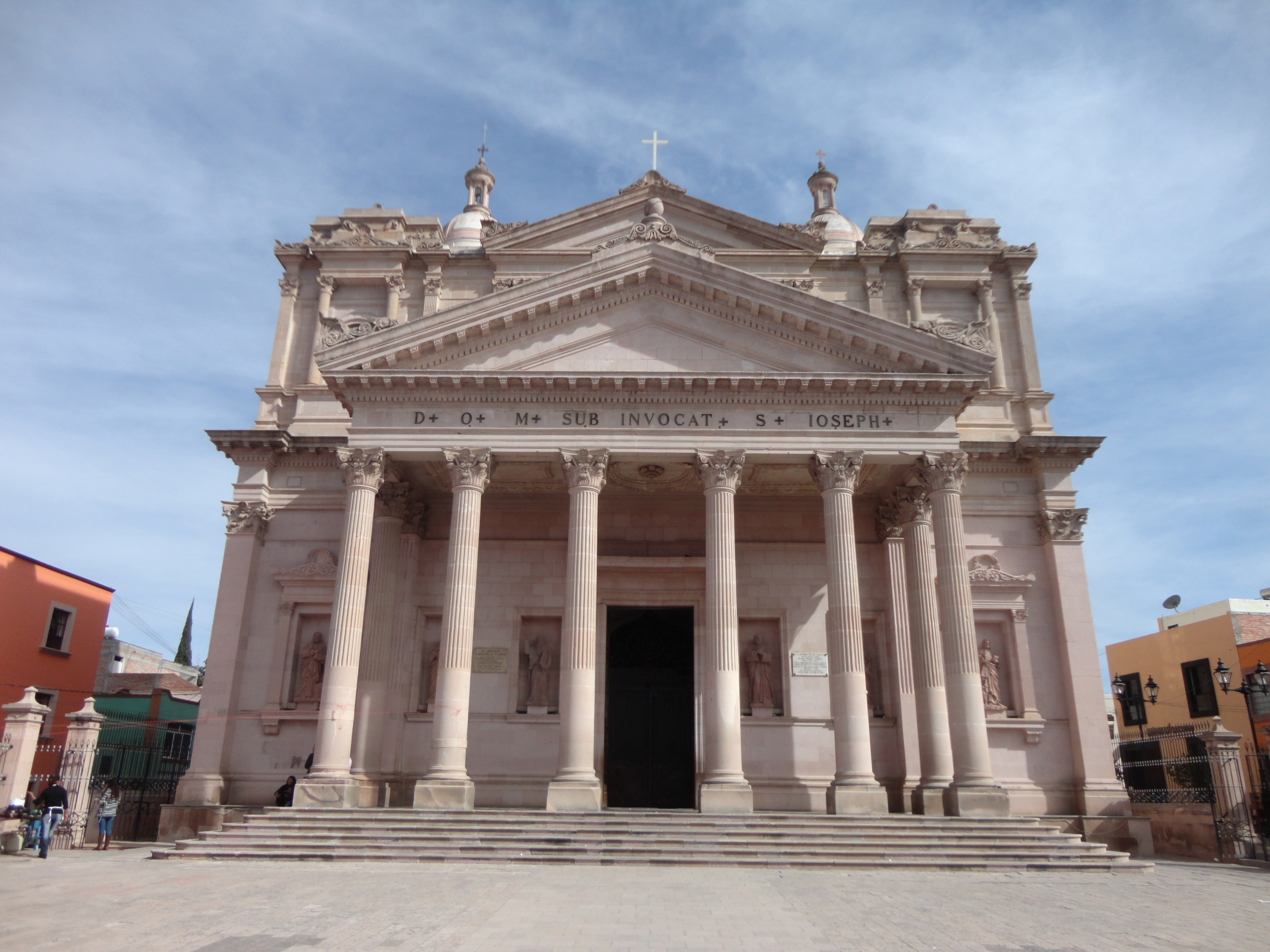
St. Joseph Parish, San José Iturbide, by Ramón Ramírez y Arangoiti (1866–1995)

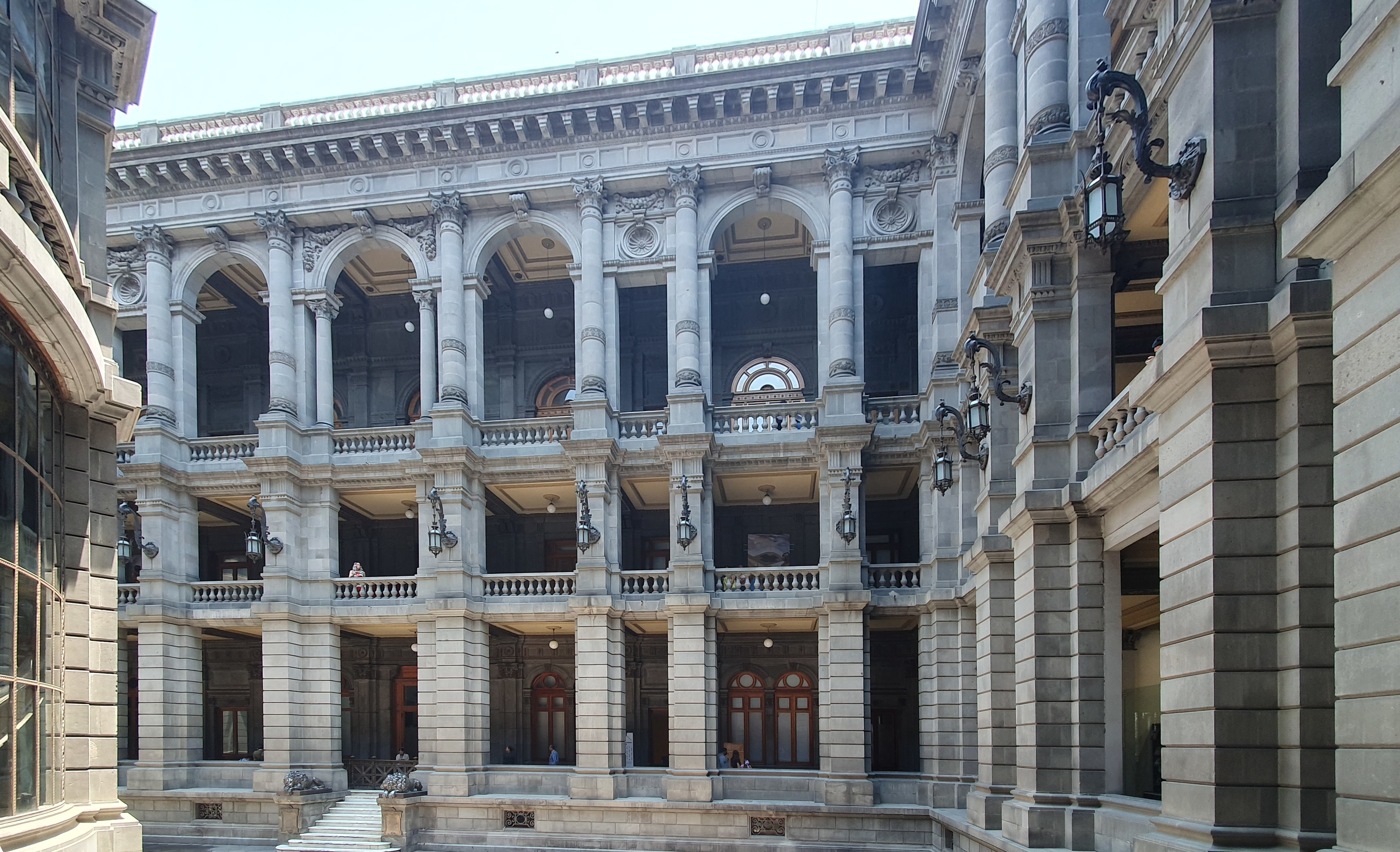
The courtyard of the Museo Nacional de Arte.

=== Rest of Latin America ===
The Neoclassical style arrived in the American empires of Spain and Portugal through projects designed in Europe or carried out locally by European or Criollo architects trained in the academies of the metropolis. There are also examples of the adaptation to the local architectural language, which during previous centuries had made a synthesis or syncretism of European and pre-Columbian elements in the so-called Colonial Baroque.

Two more Classical criteria belong, in Chile, the La Moneda Palace (1784–1805) and the Santiago Metropolitan Cathedral (1748–1899), both works by the Italian architect Joaquín Toesca. In Ecuador, the Quito's Palacio de Carondelet (Ecuador's Government Palace) built between 1611 and 1801 by Antonio García. At the dawn of the independence of Hispanic America, constructive programs were developed in the new republics. Neoclassicism was introduced in New Granada by Marcelino Pérez de Arroyo. Later, in Colombia, the Capitolio Nacional was built in Bogotá between 1848 and 1926 by Thomas Reed, trained at the Berlin Bauakademie; the Primatial Cathedral of Bogotá (1807–1823), designed by Friar Domingo de Petrés; and in Peru the Basilica Cathedral of Arequipa built between 1540 and 1844 by Lucas Poblete.

Brazil, which became the seat of the court of the Portuguese monarchy, gaining independence from its metropolis as the Empire of Brazil, also used the resources of architecture for the glorification of political power, and it was decided to resort to architects trained in the Académie royale d'architecture. To this period belong the portal of the Imperial Academy of Fine Arts in Rio de Janeiro made in 1826 and the Imperial Palace of Petrópolis built between 1845 and 1862.

Argentina is another of the countries that seeks to shed its colonial past, but in the context of the reorganization of the country after independence in 1810, an aspect of power was sought that transmitted the presence of the State, inspiring respect and devotion, including of course the architecture. However, a style of its own was not conceived, but the Classical canon was introduced, not in the form of a replica of buildings from Antiquity, but with a classical predominance and a lot of influence from French Classicism; which lasted until the 20th century.

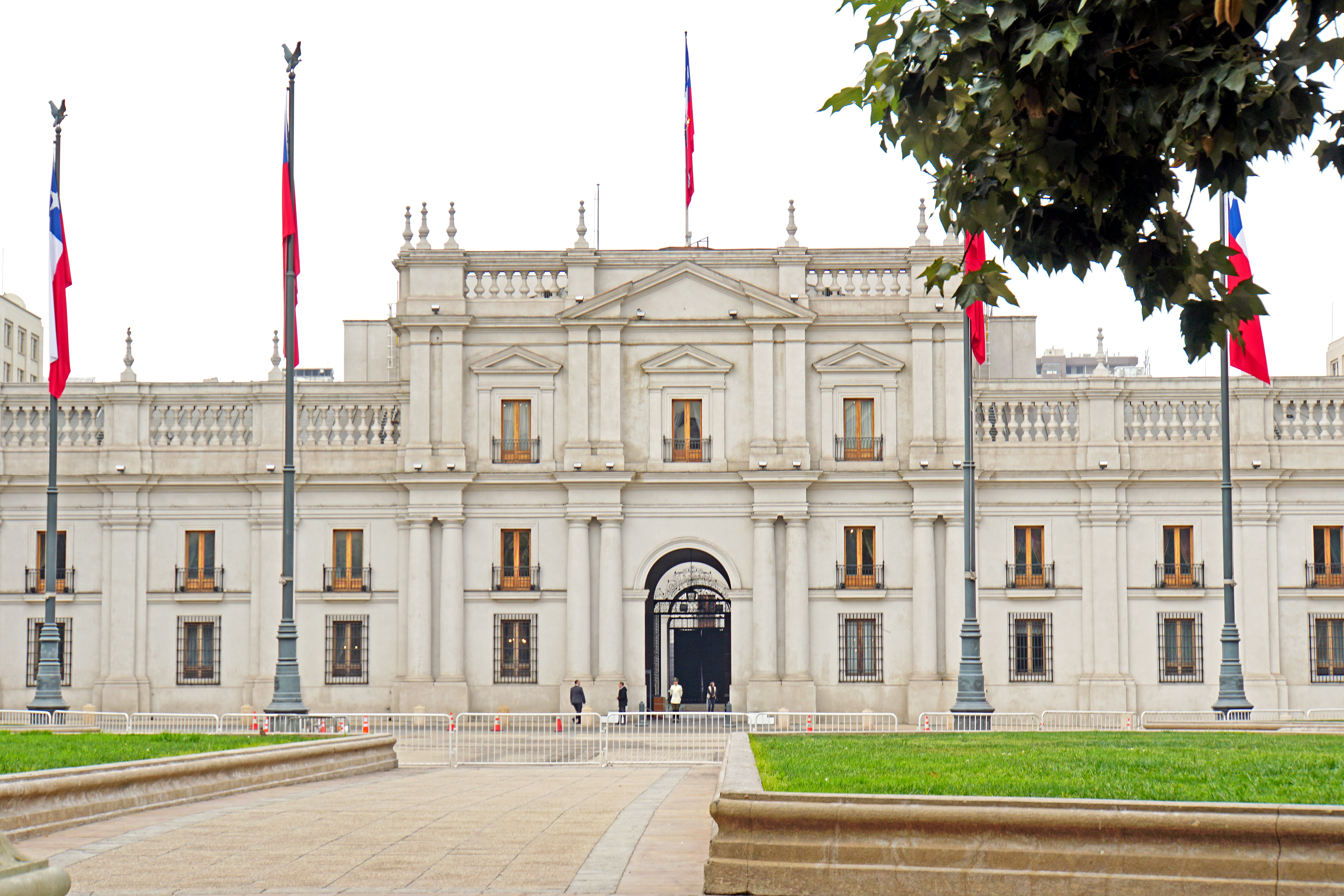
La Moneda Palace from Santiago de Chile (1784–1805) by Joaquín Toesca

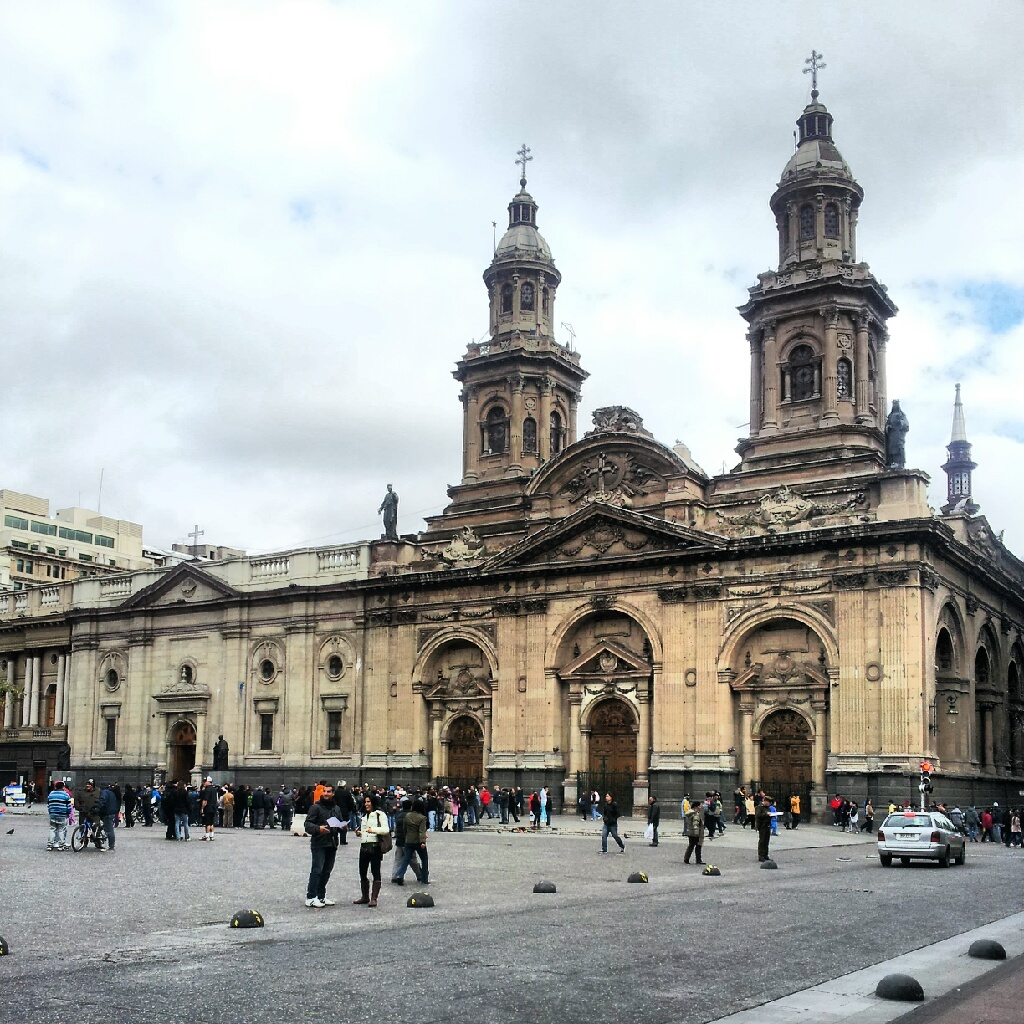
Santiago Metropolitan Cathedral, Chile (1748–1906) by Joaquín Toesca and Ignacio Cremonesi

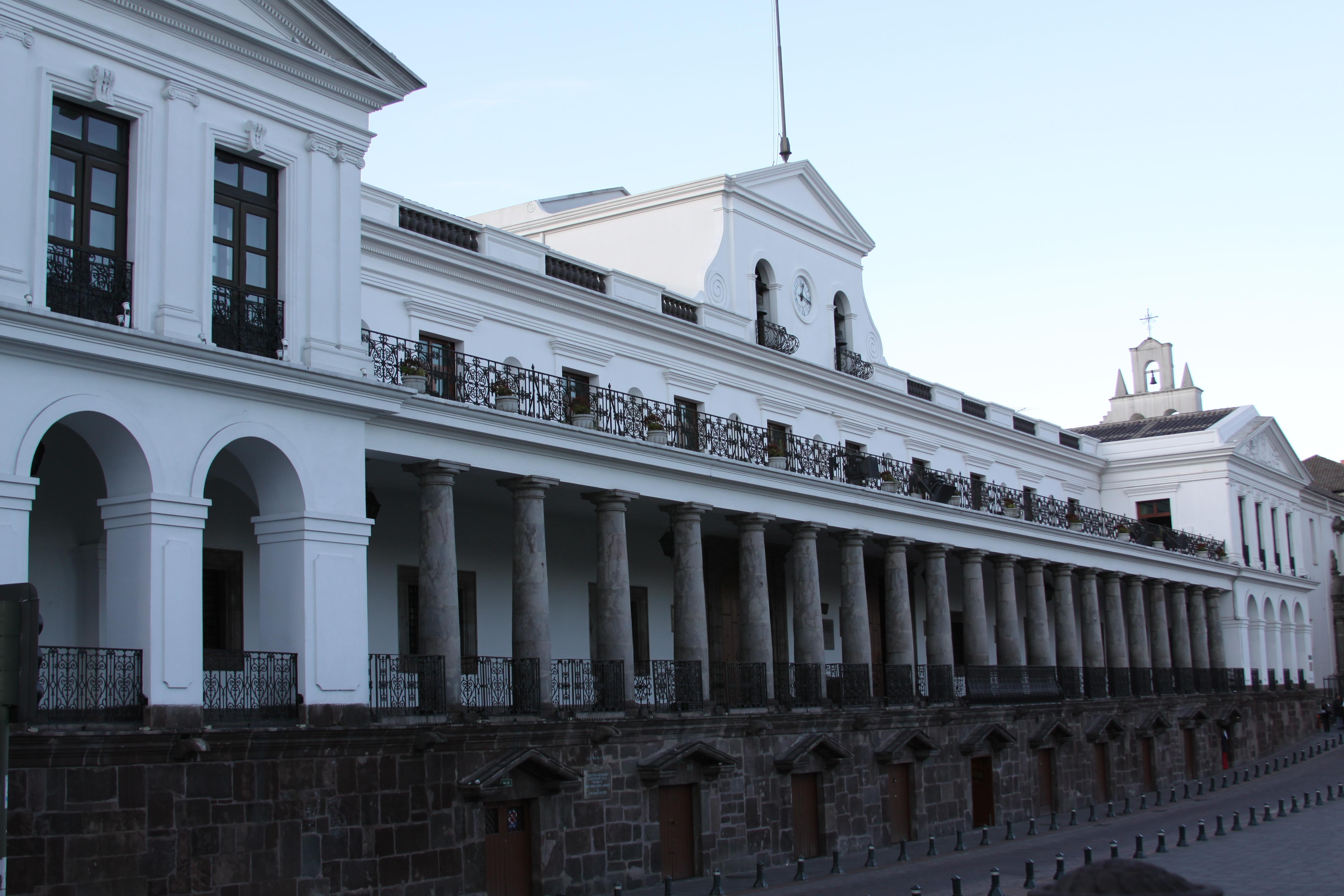
Palacio de Carondelet Quito, Ecuador built between (1611–1801) by Antonio García

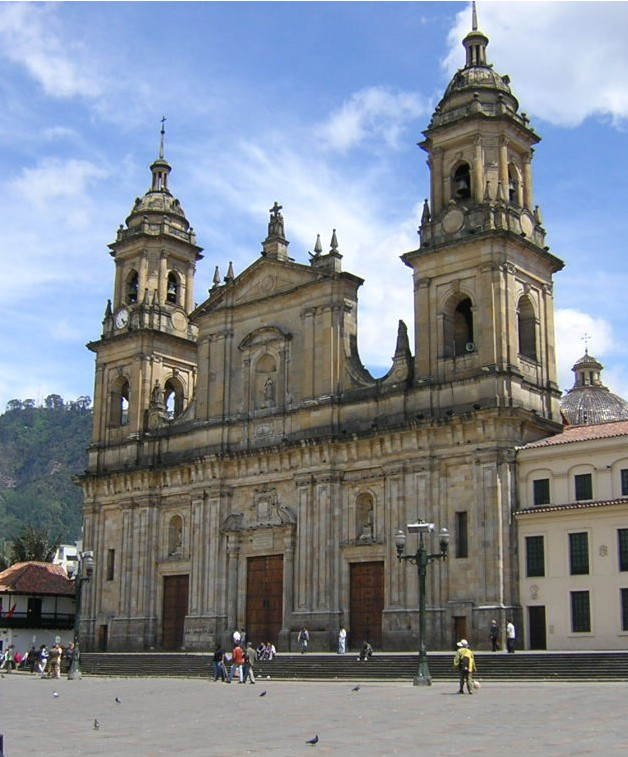
Primatial Cathedral of Bogotá, Bogotá, Colombia (1807–1823) by Friar Domingo de Petrés

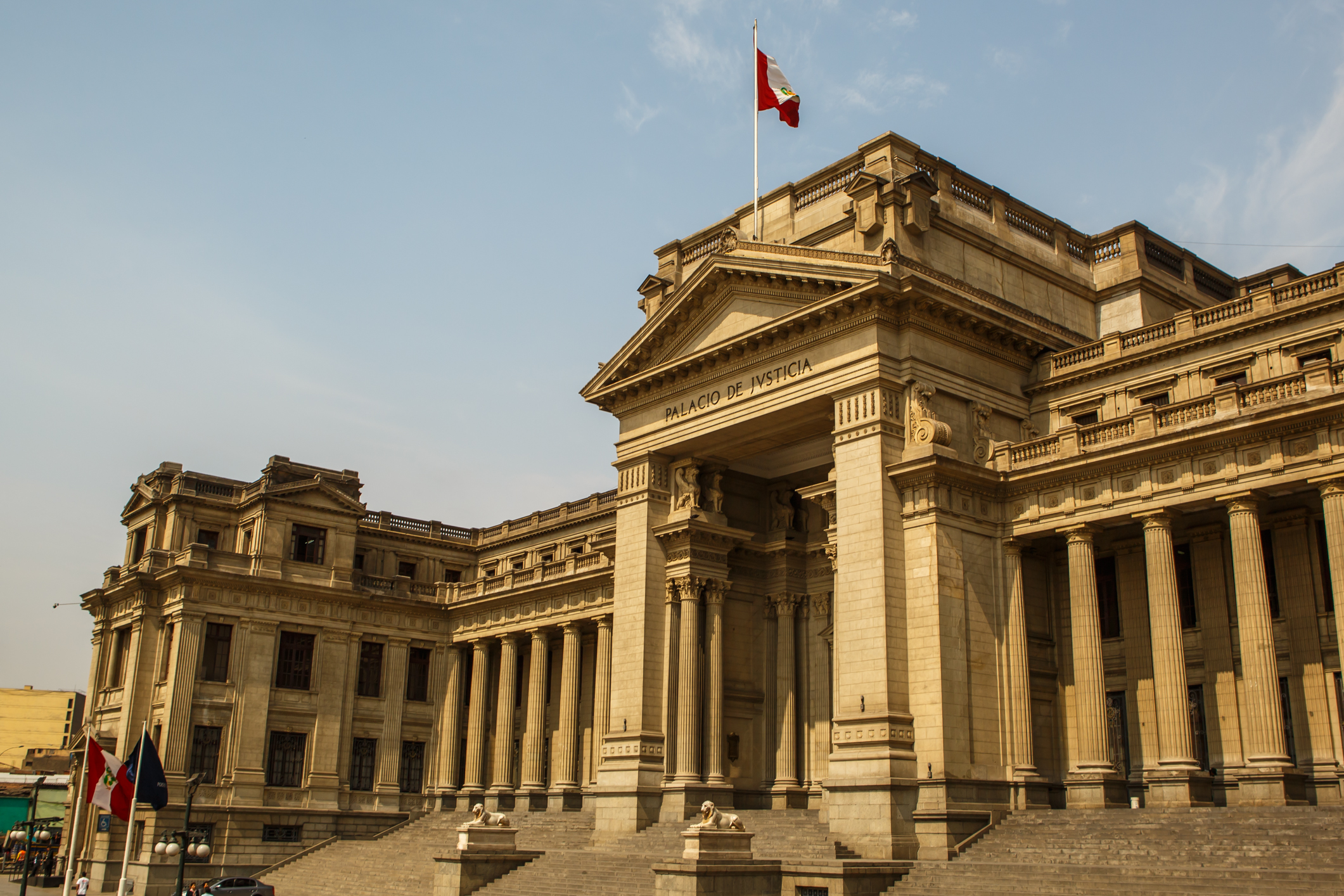
Palace of Justice, Lima, Peru (1939) by Bruno Paprowsky

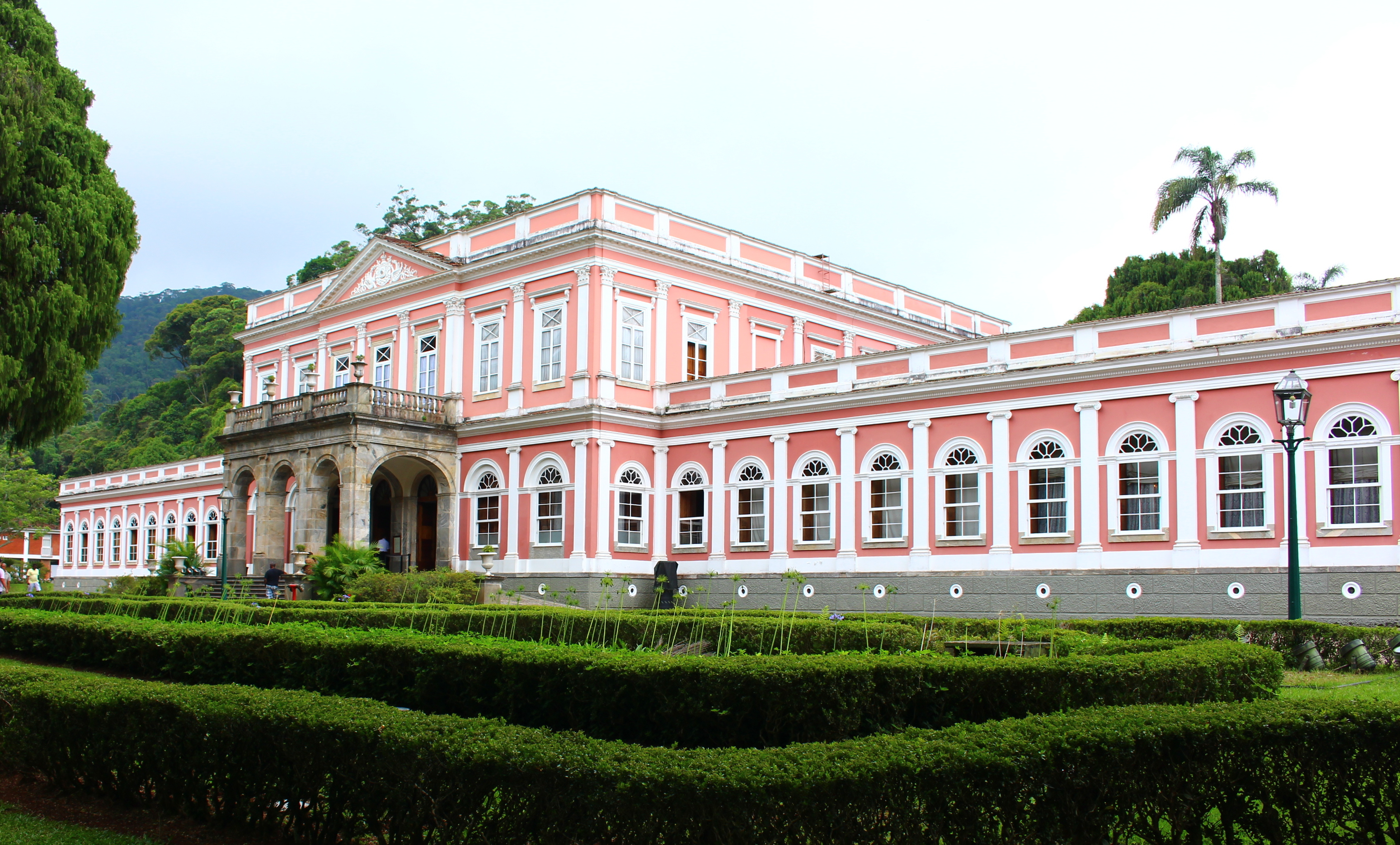
Imperial Palace of Petrópolis, Petrópolis, Brazil (1845–1862) by Julius Friedrich Koeler

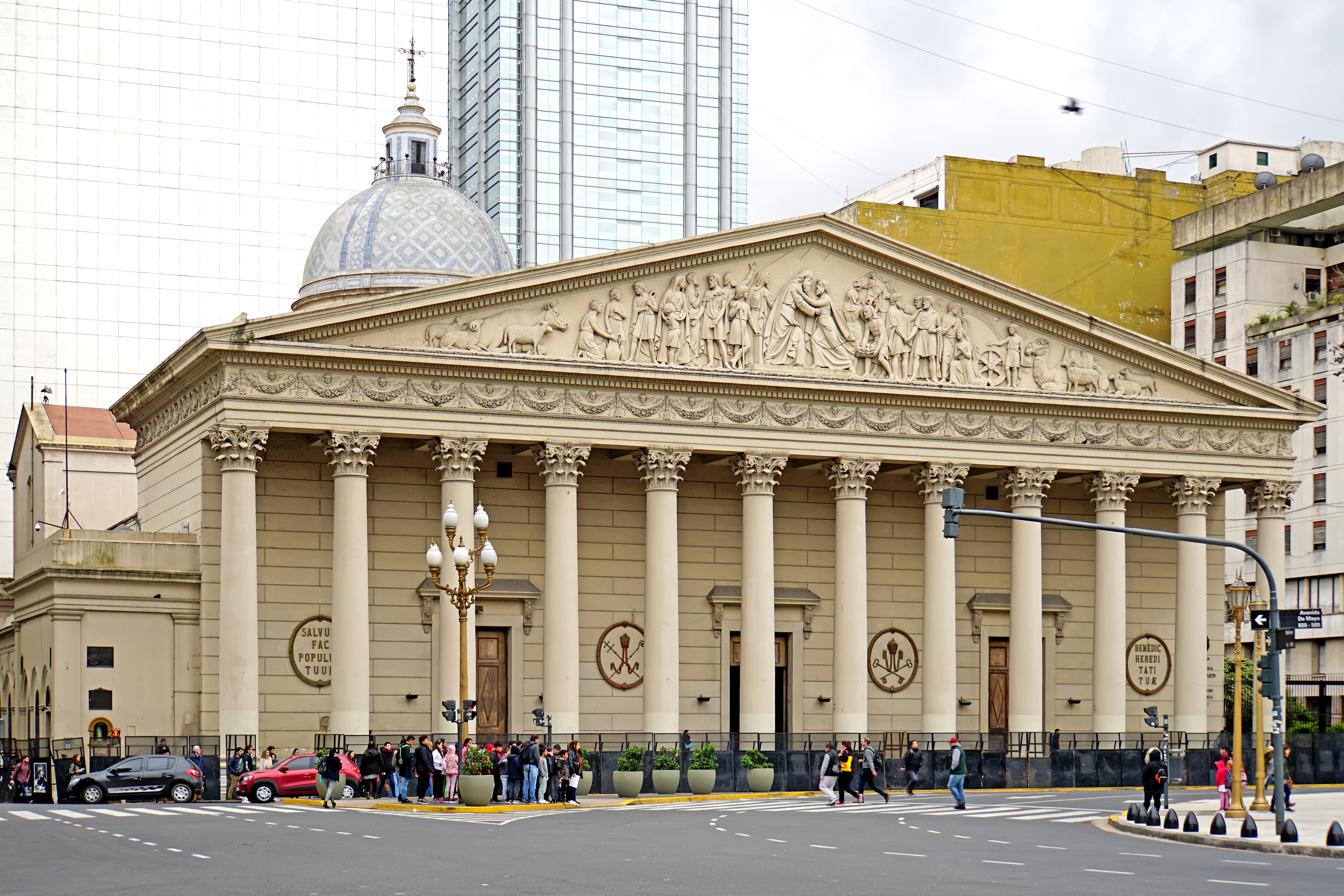
Buenos Aires Metropolitan Cathedral, (Buenos Aires, Argentina) (1754–1823) by Antonio Masella and Prosper Catelin

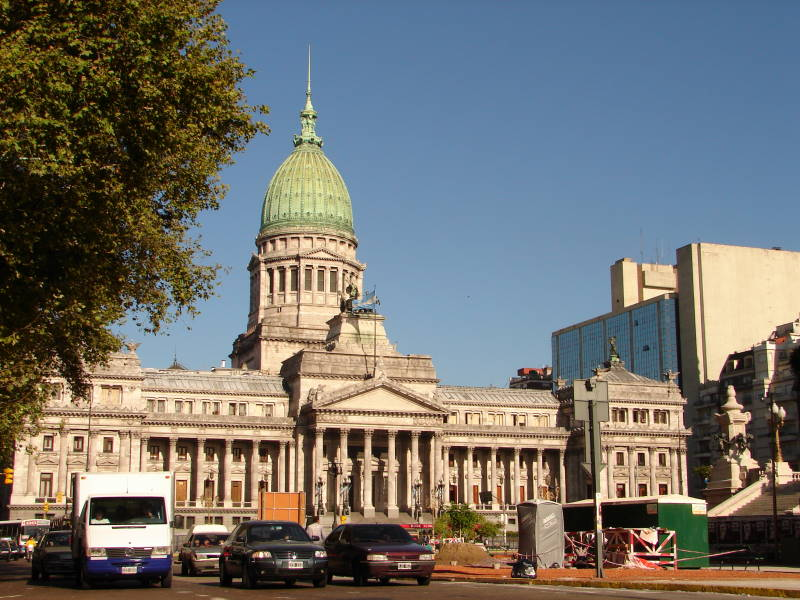
Palace of the Argentine National Congress (1896–1906) by Vittorio Meano

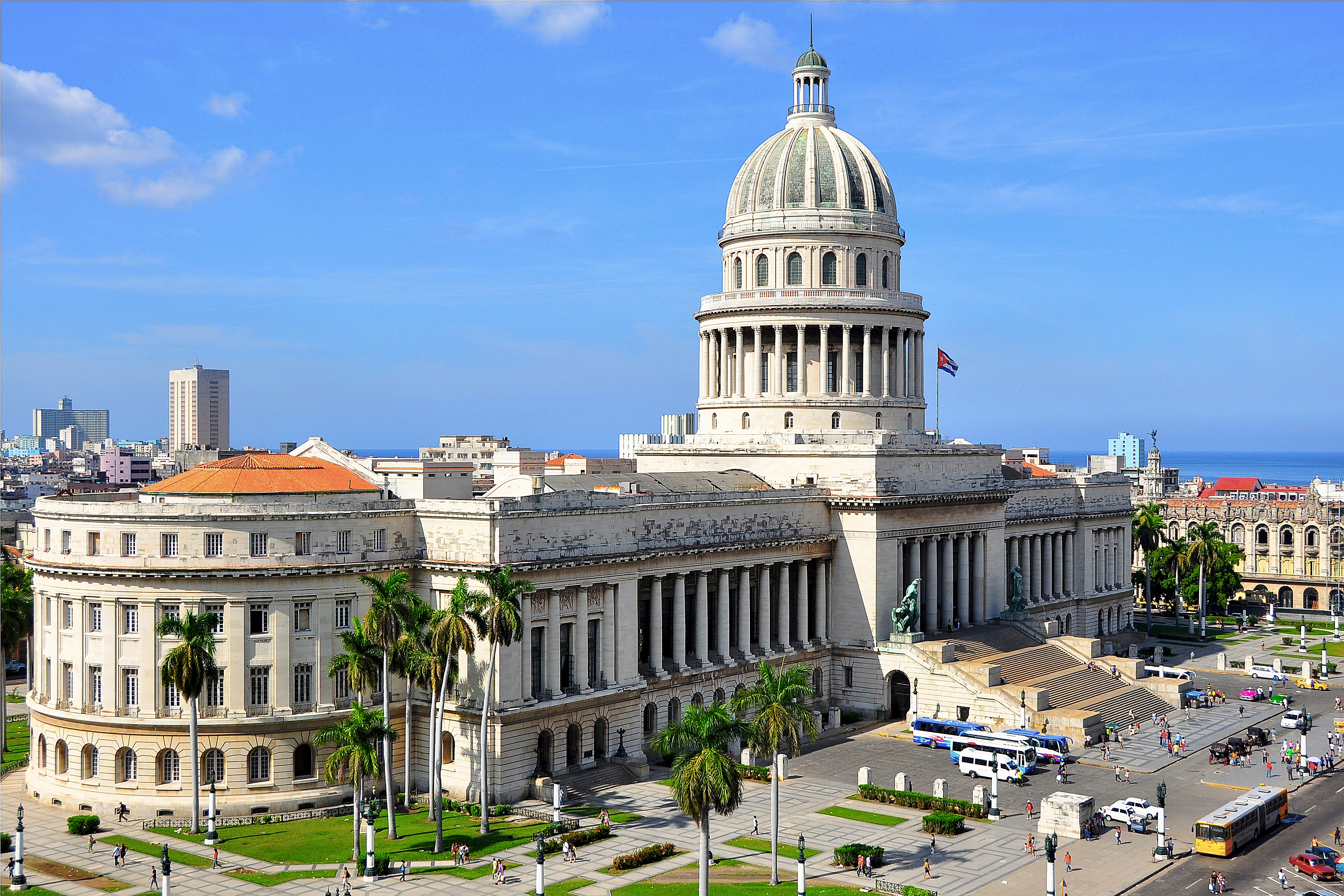
El Capitolio, Havana, Cuba (1926–1929) by Eugenio Rayneri Piedra

=== Netherlands ===
Neoclassicism in the Netherlands became popular in the late 18th and early 19th centuries. It was inspired by the architecture of ancient Greece and Rome and is known for its symmetry, elegant proportions, columns, and decorative pediments. Dutch neoclassical buildings were often used as town halls, palaces, villas, and public institutions. Famous examples include Villa Welgelegen in Haarlem, which shows the grandeur and balance of the style. In the Netherlands, neoclassicism reflected ideals of order, progress, and refinement during a time of political and cultural change.

Villa Welgelegen

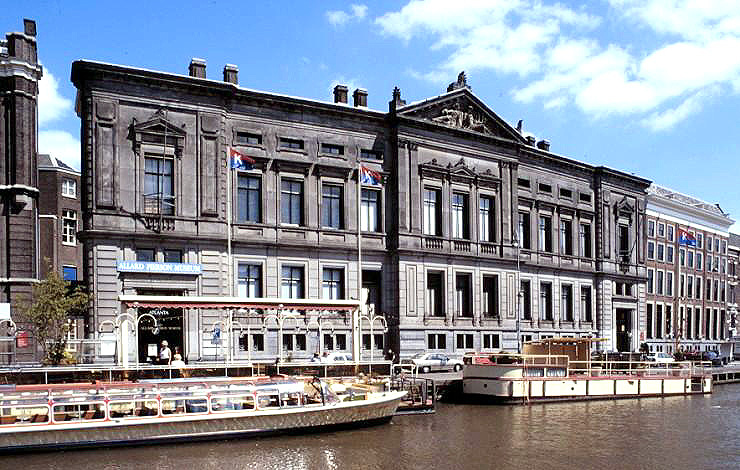
Allard Pierson Museum

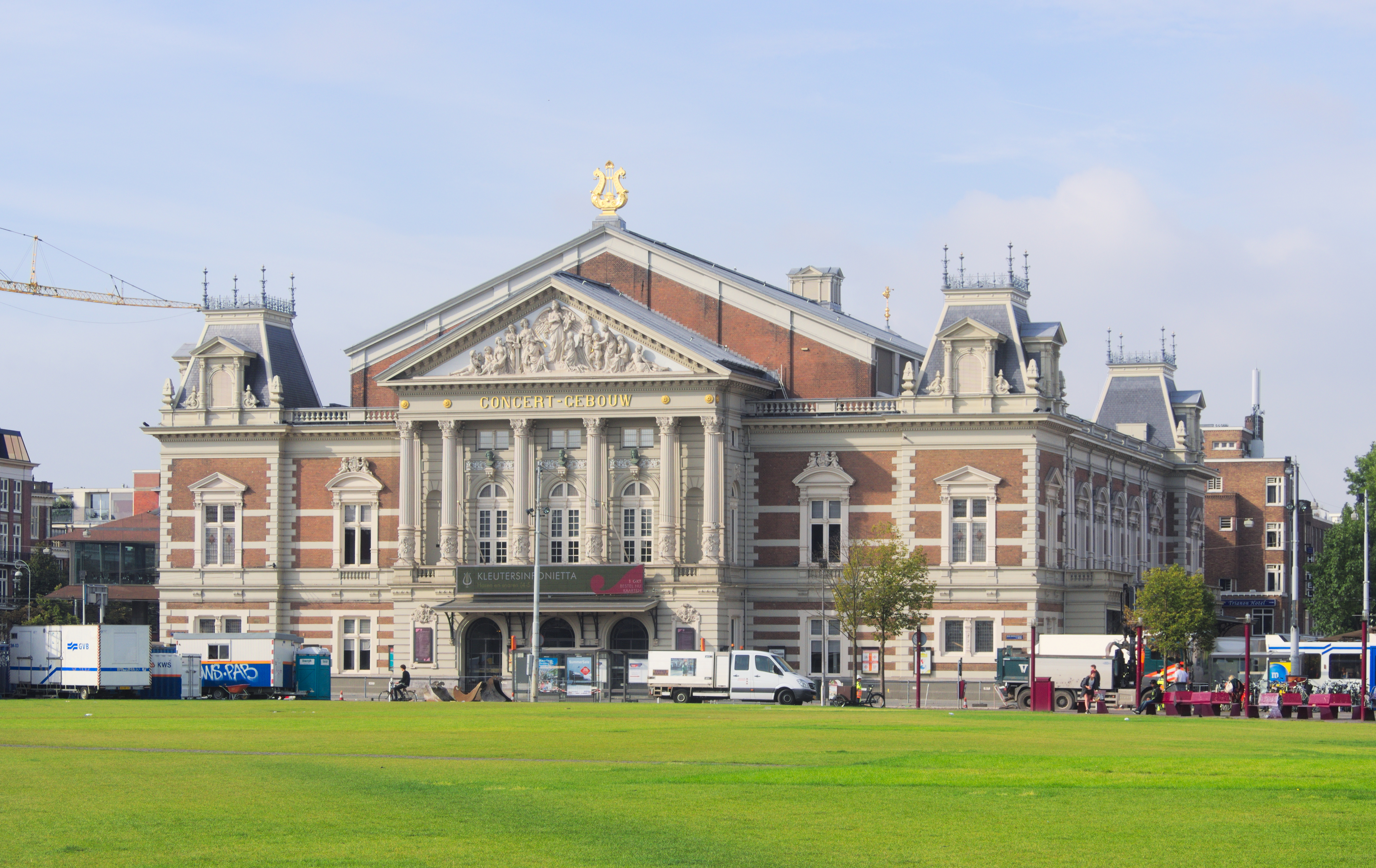
Concertgebouw, Amsterdam

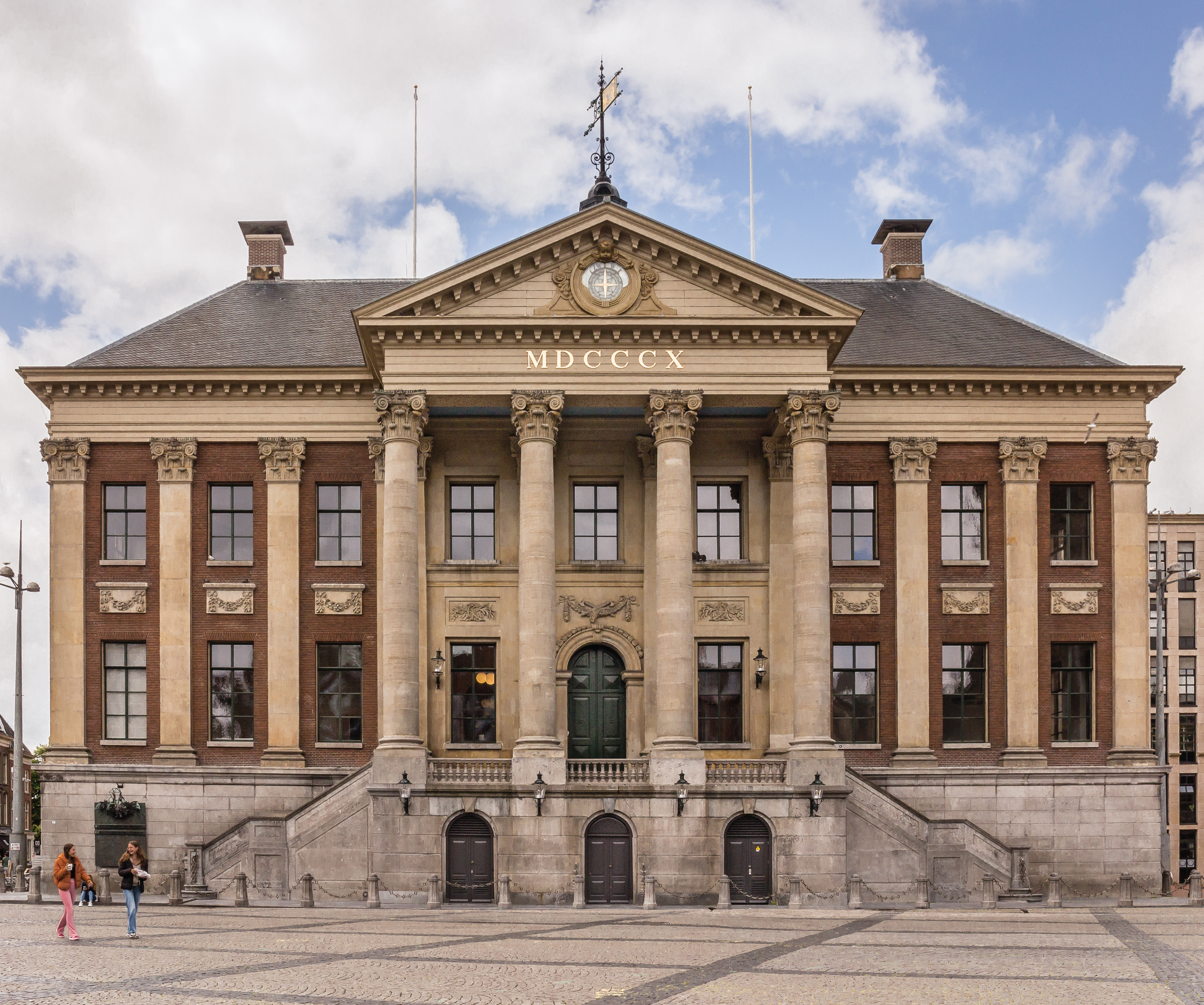
Groningen City Hall

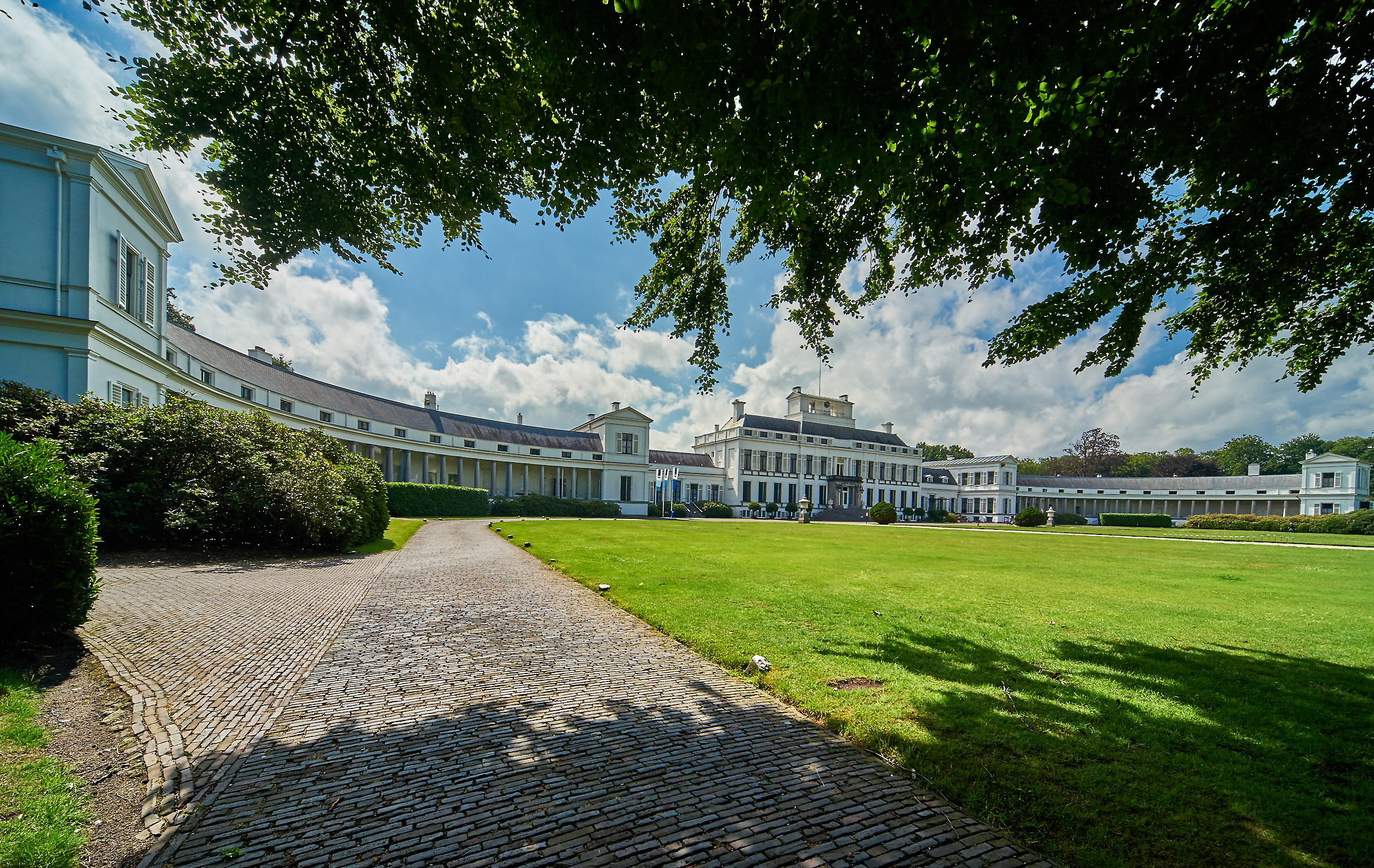
Soestdijk Palace

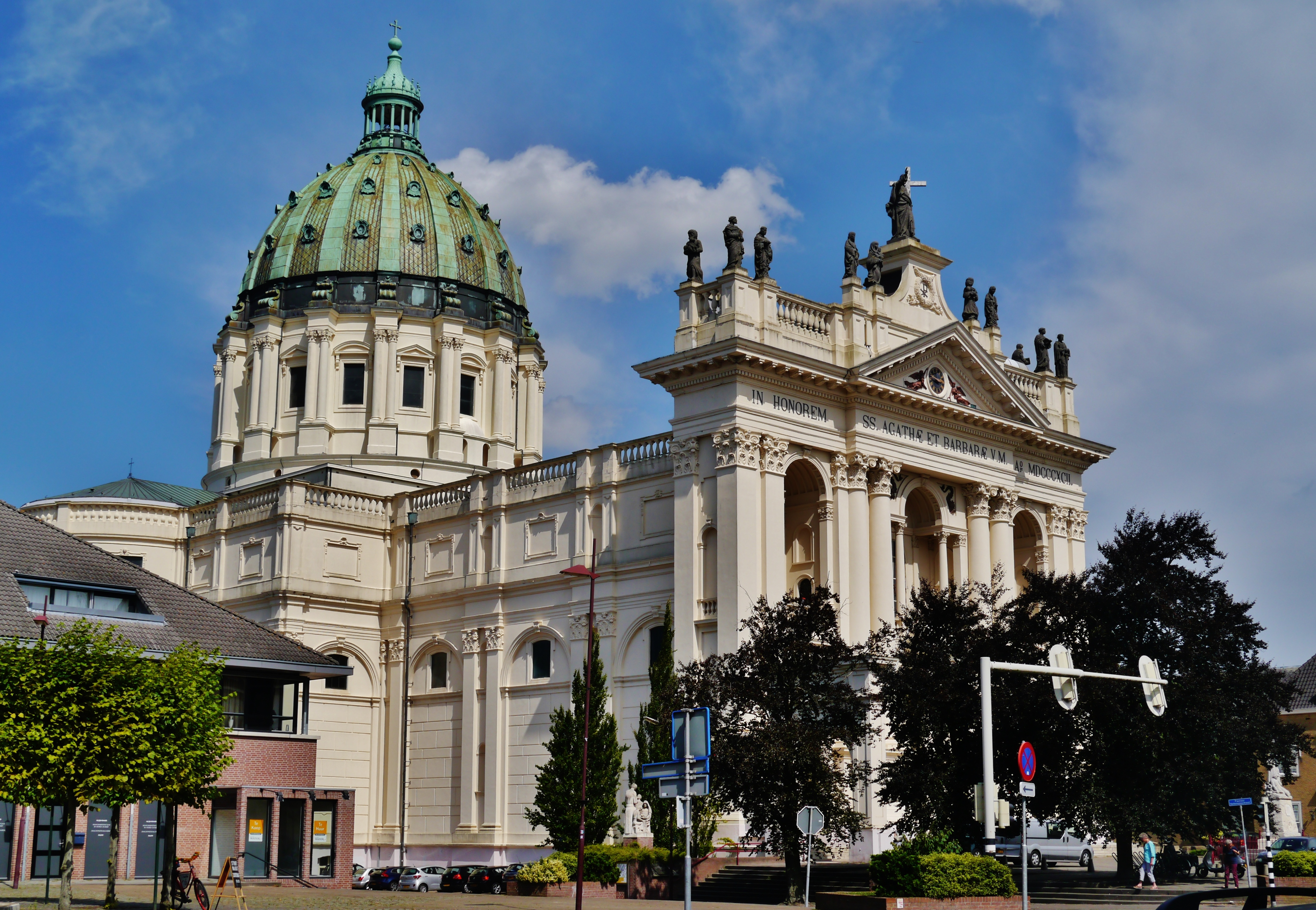
Oudenbosch Basilica

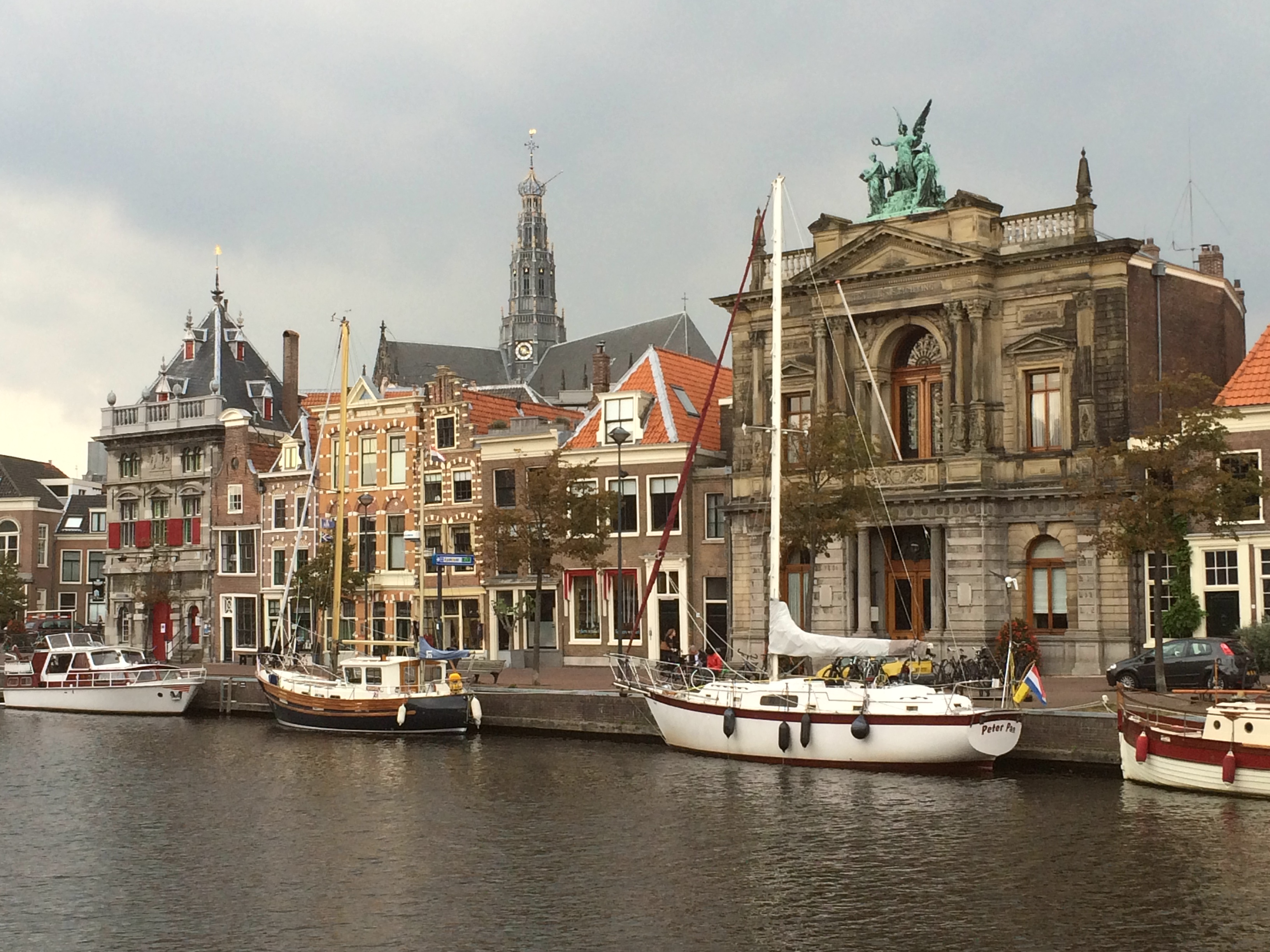
Teylers Museum

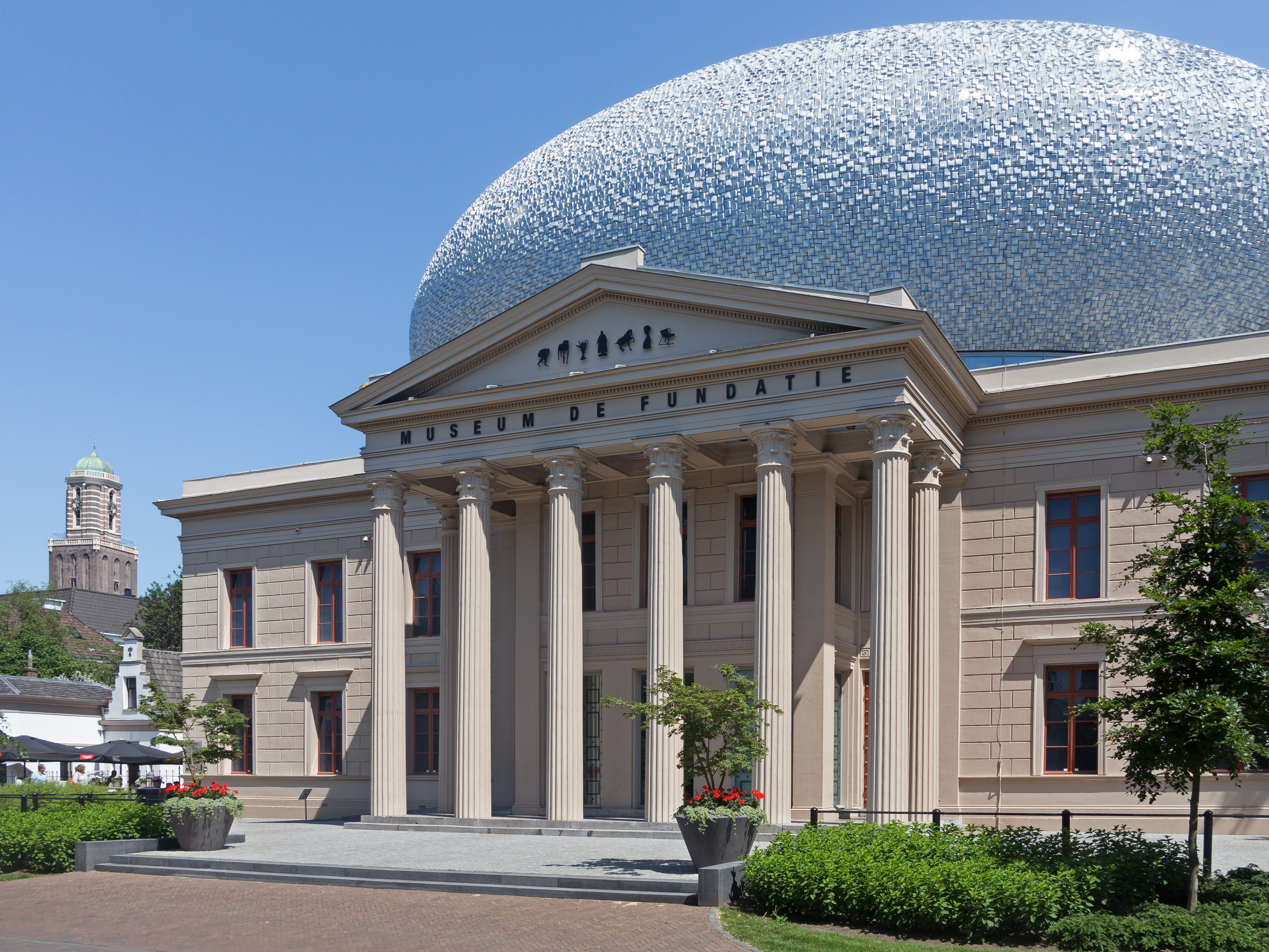
Museum de Fundatie

=== Norway ===
Norway has many examples of Neoclassical architecture, notably in Oslo, exemplified by the Royal Palace, Oslo University, and the Vigeland Museum, which showcases elegant proportions and classical details. This style was a significant architectural phase in the 19th century and the early 20th century, with a transition into Functionalism after the period of Nordic Classicism between 1910 and 1930.

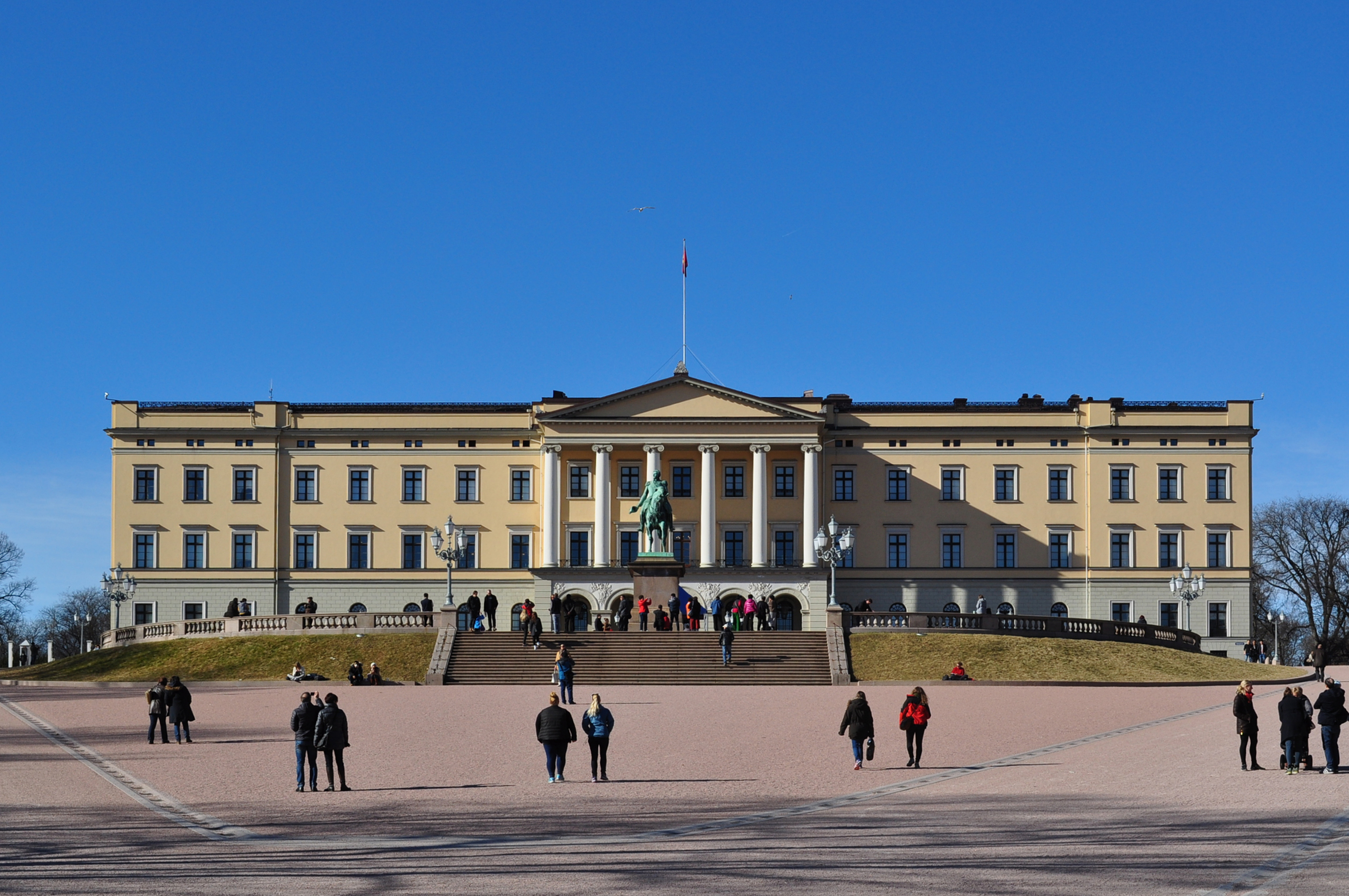
The Royal Palace of Norway

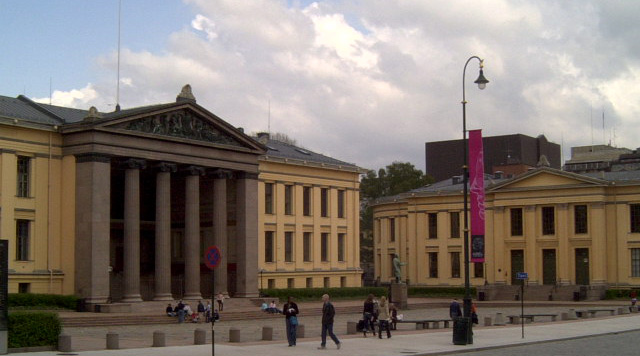
The University of Oslo

=== Philippines ===
Like most western traditions in the former Spanish East Indies, neoclassicism arrived in the Pacific Archipelagos via rule from New Spain (Mexico) during the period of governance by Mexico City as an architecture manifested in churches and civic buildings. When the power over the archipelago was transferred from the Spanish Crown to the United States of America, the style became more popular and developed from slightly simple approach during the Spanish era, to a more ornamented style of the Beaux-Arts architecture sparked by the return of massive number of architectural students to the islands from the western schools. It also became a symbol of American-style democracy and the approaching republic during the commonwealth.

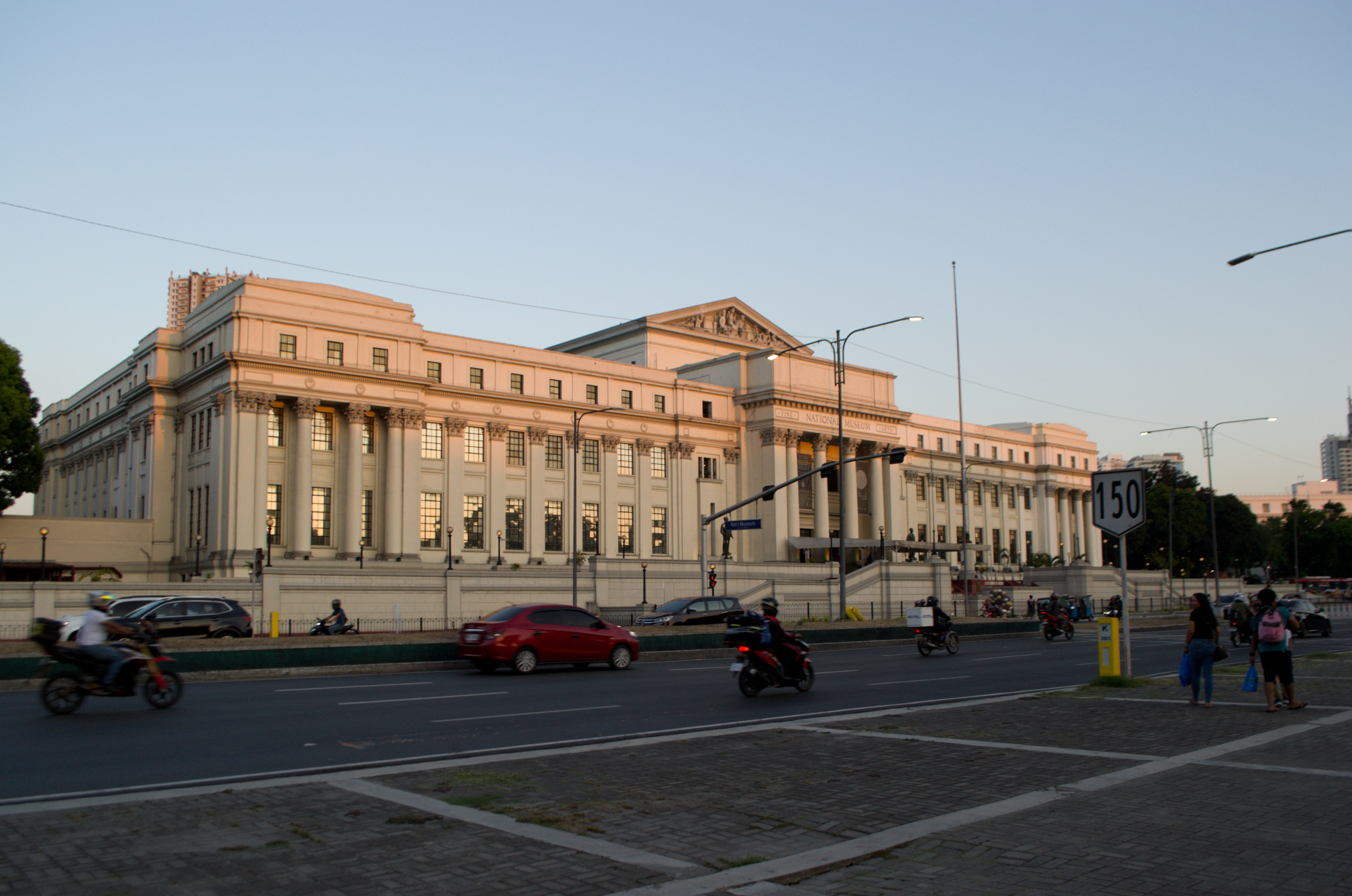
National Museum of Fine Arts (Manila)

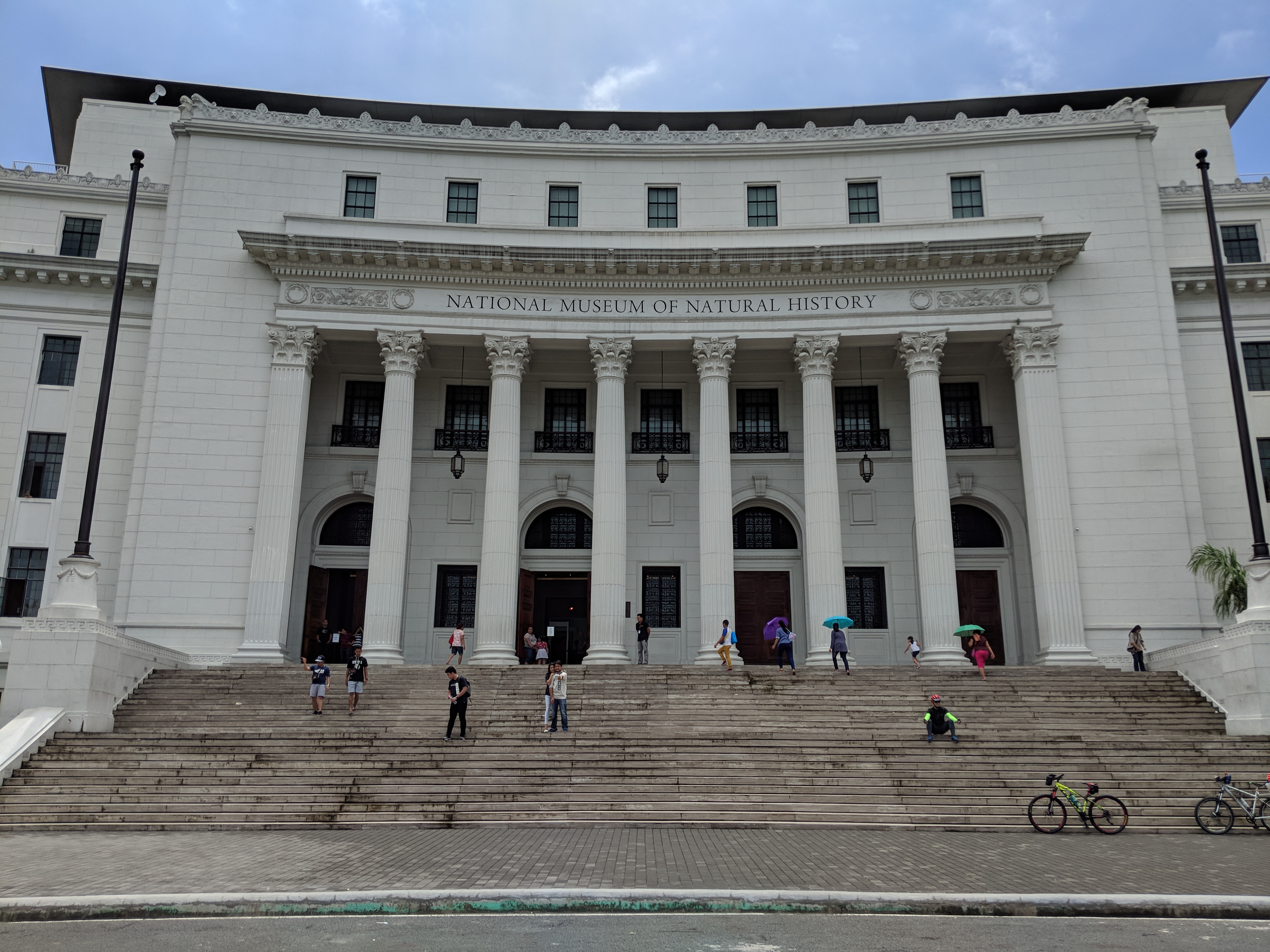
National Museum of Natural History (Manila)

National Museum of Anthropology (Manila)

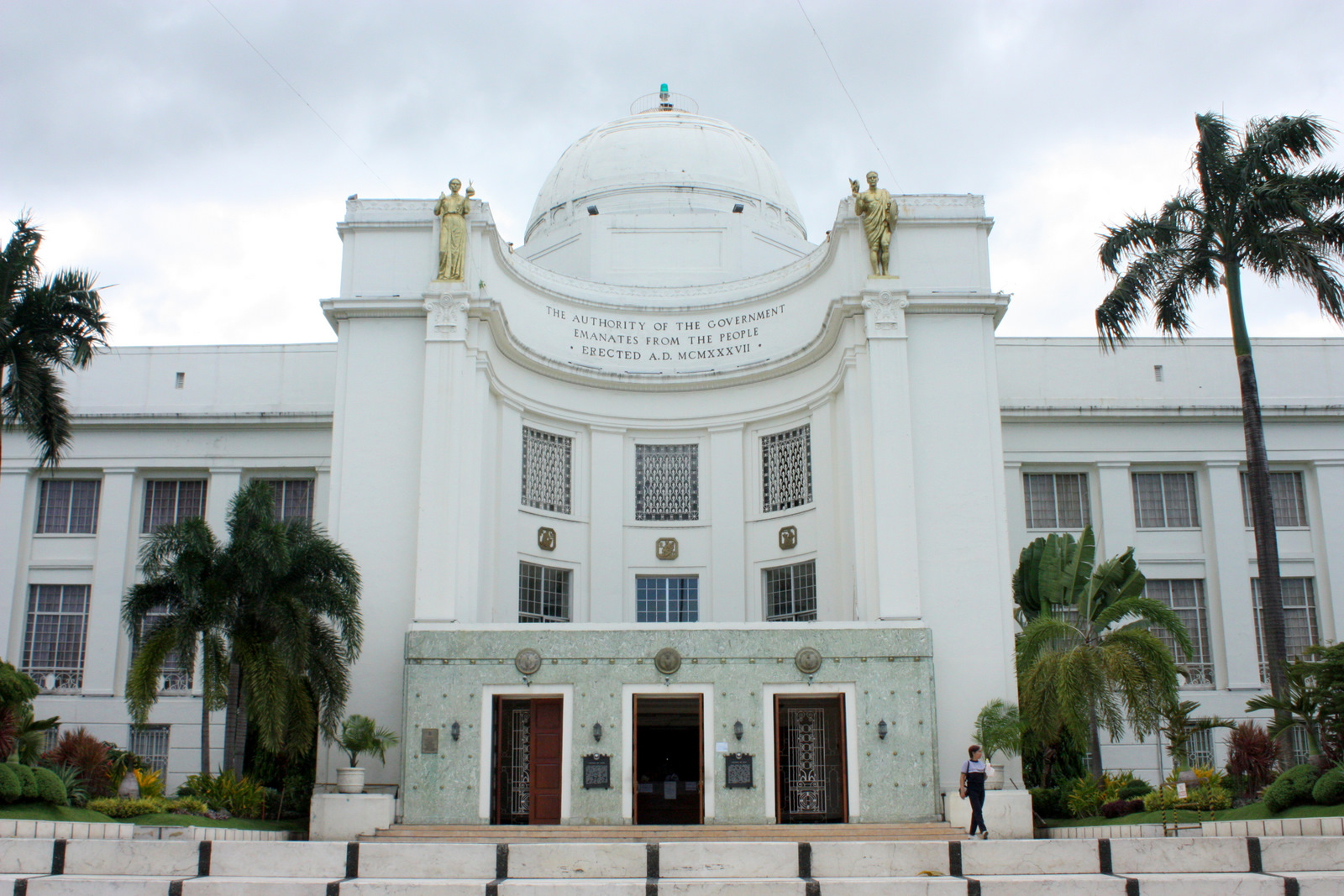
Cebu Provincial Capitol

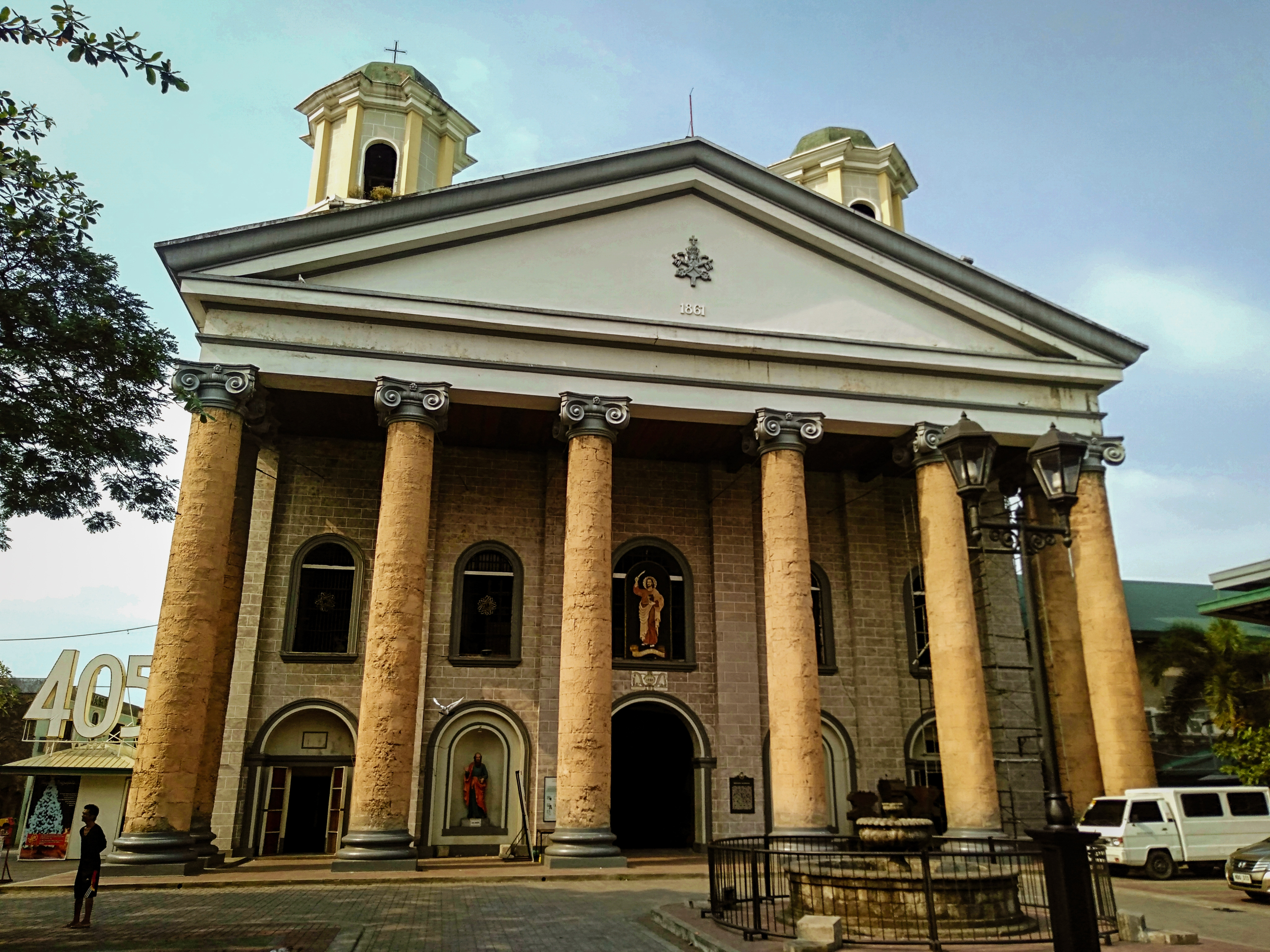
San Bartolome Church (Malabon)

=== Polish–Lithuanian Commonwealth ===
The centre of Polish-Lithuanian Neoclassicism was Warsaw and Vilnius under the rule of the last Polish king and Lithuanian grand duke, Stanisław August Poniatowski. Vilnius University was another important centre of Neoclassical architecture in Europe, led by the notable professors of architecture Marcin Knackfus, Laurynas Gucevičius and Karol Podczaszyński. The style was expressed in the shape of main public buildings, such as the Vilnius University Astronomical Observatory, Vilnius Cathedral and the town hall.

The best-known architects and artists, who worked in the Polish–Lithuanian Commonwealth were Dominik Merlini, Jan Chrystian Kamsetzer, Szymon Bogumił Zug, Jakub Kubicki, Antonio Corazzi, Efraim Szreger, Chrystian Piotr Aigner and Bertel Thorvaldsen.

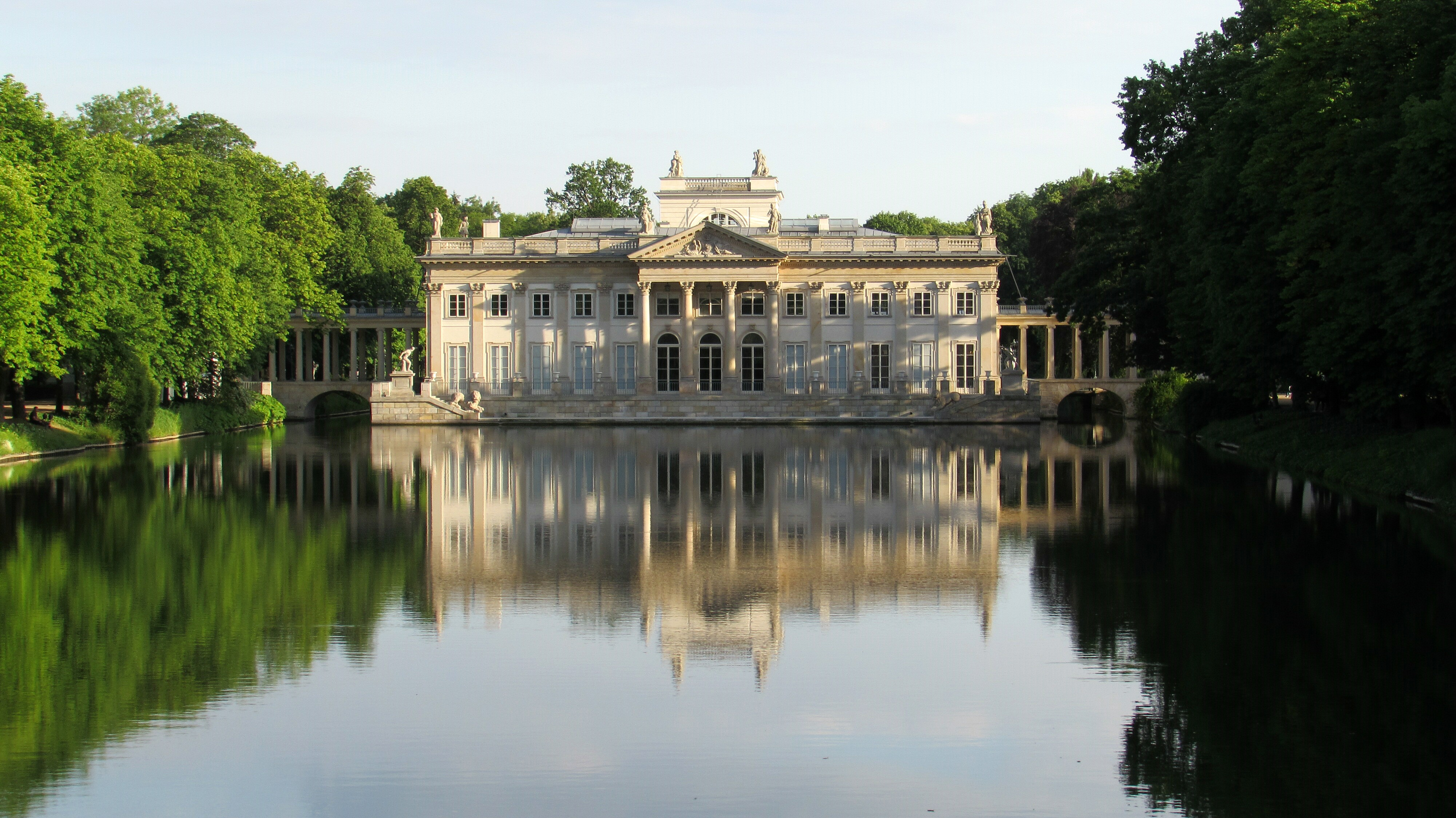
Palace on the Isle in Warsaw by Domenico Merlini and Johann Christian Kammsetzer, (1773–93)

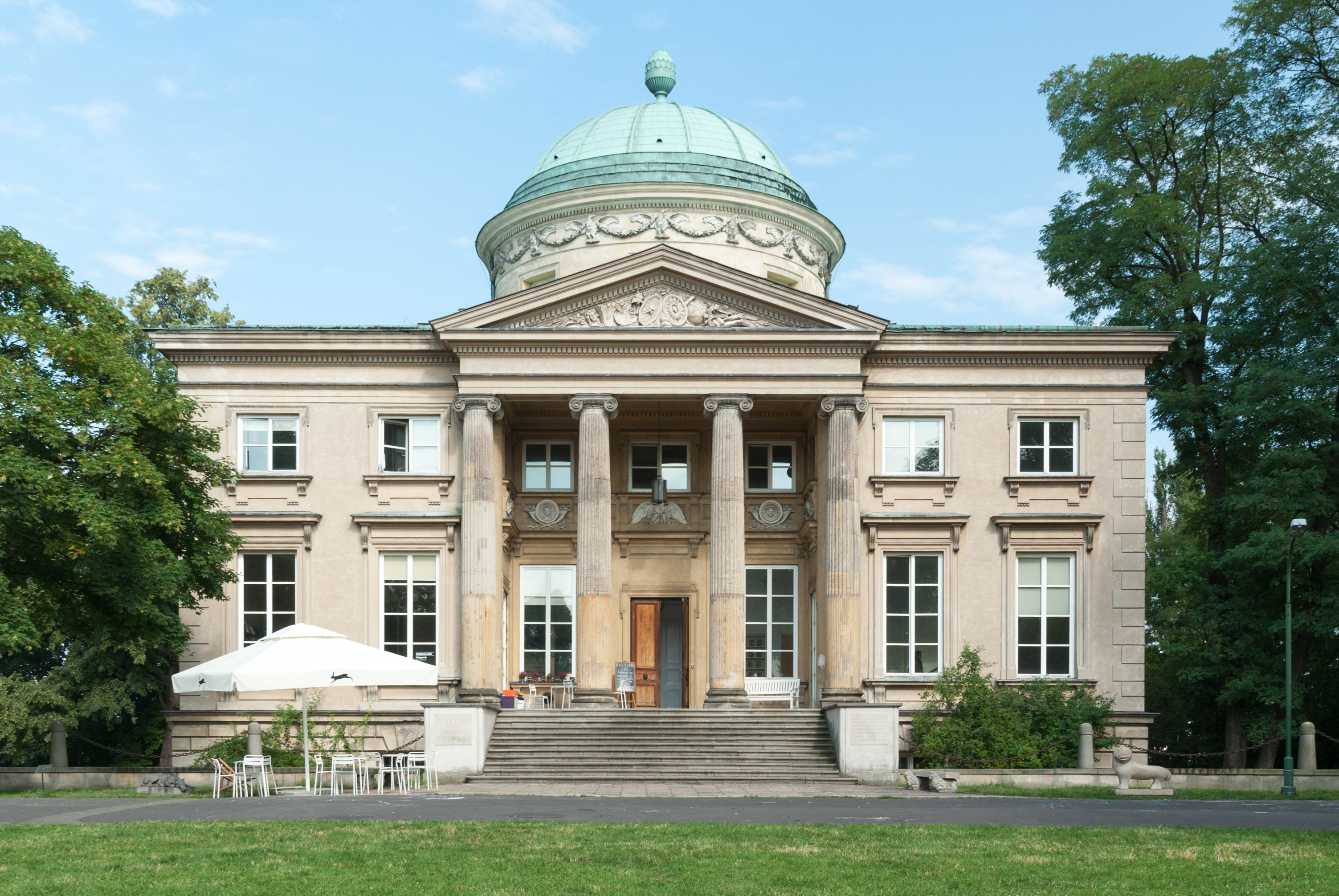
Królikarnia in Warsaw by Domenico Merlini, (1782–86)

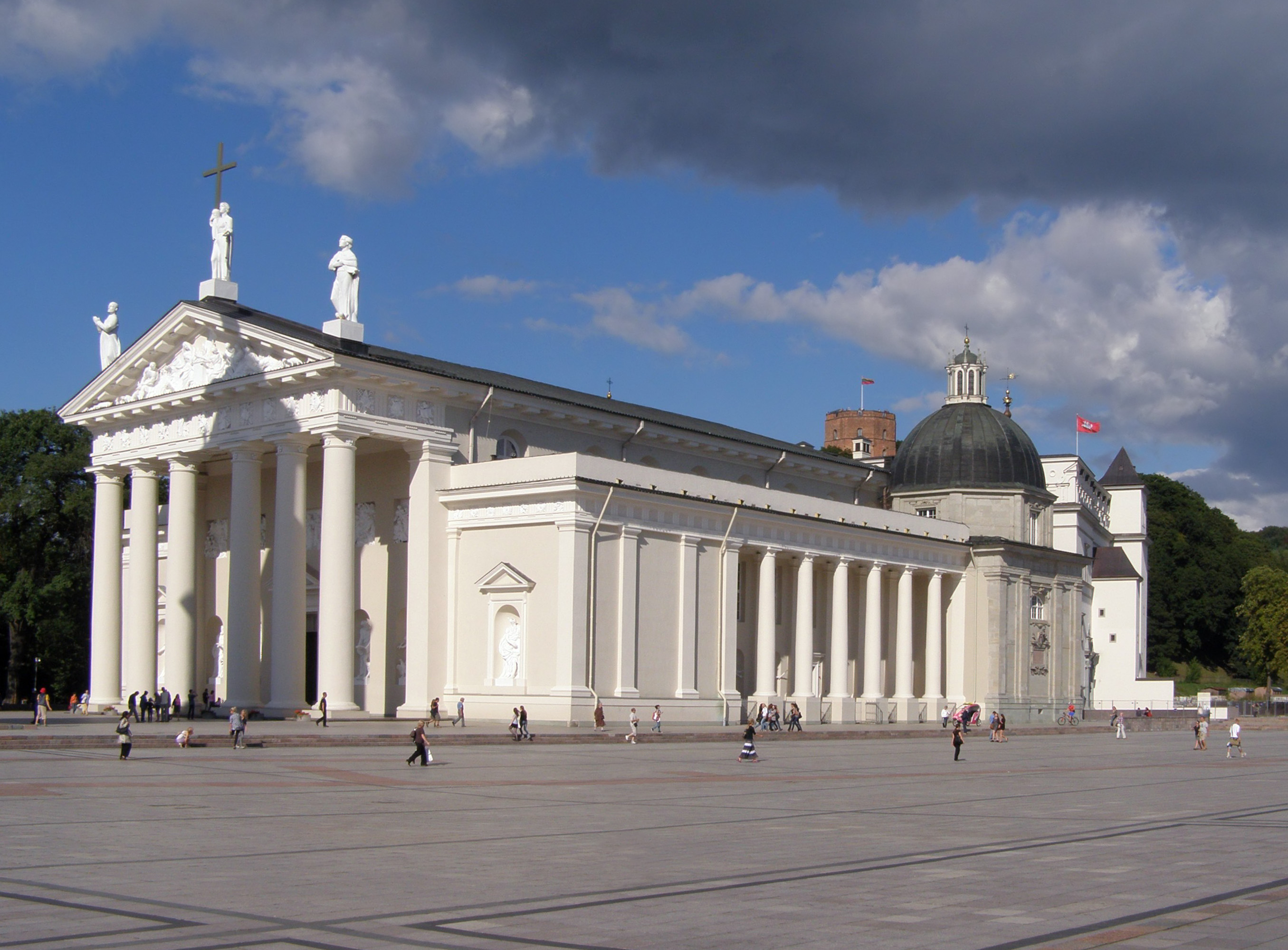
Vilnius Cathedral by Laurynas Gucevičius, (1777–1801)

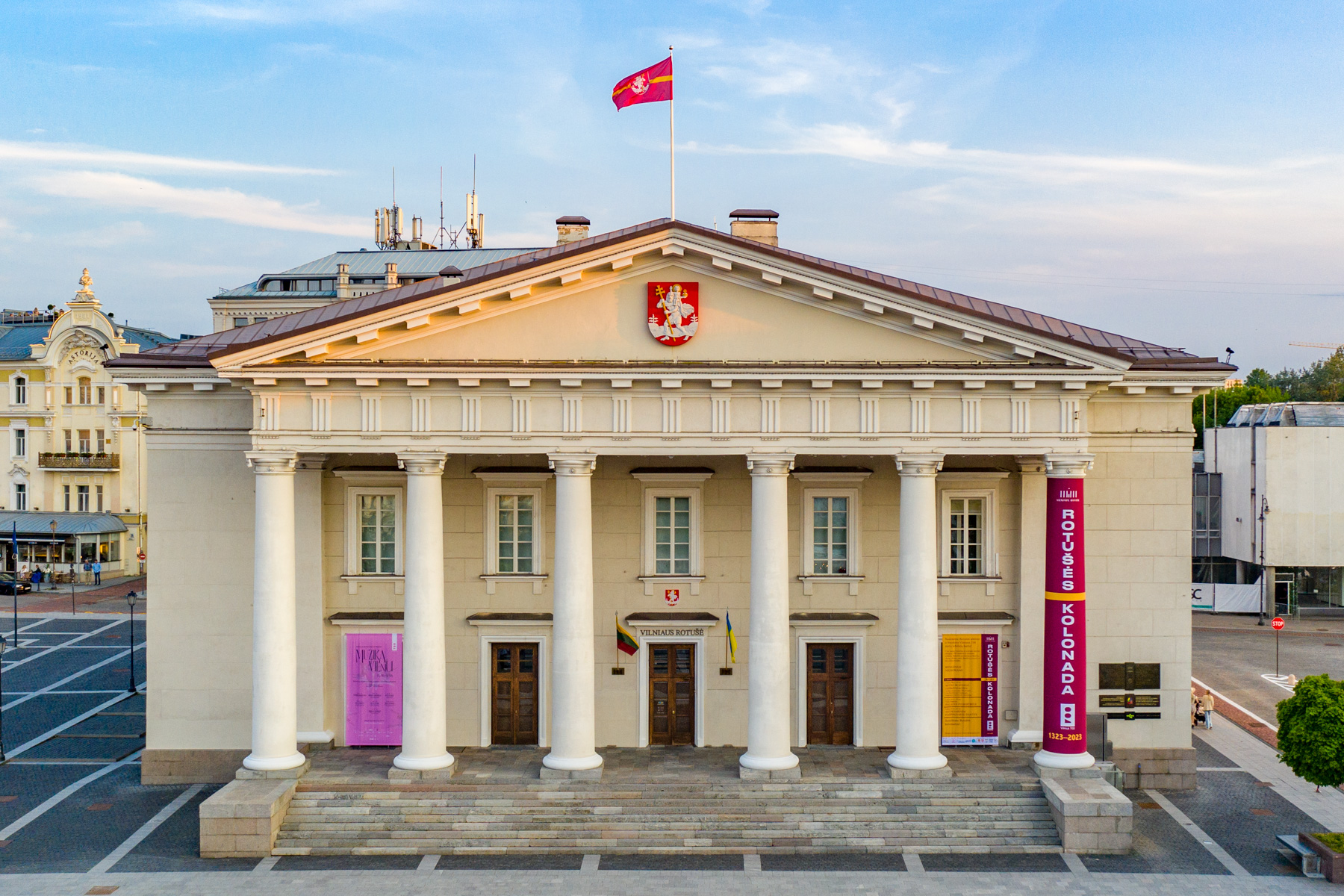
Vilnius Town Hall by Laurynas Gucevičius, (1785–1799)

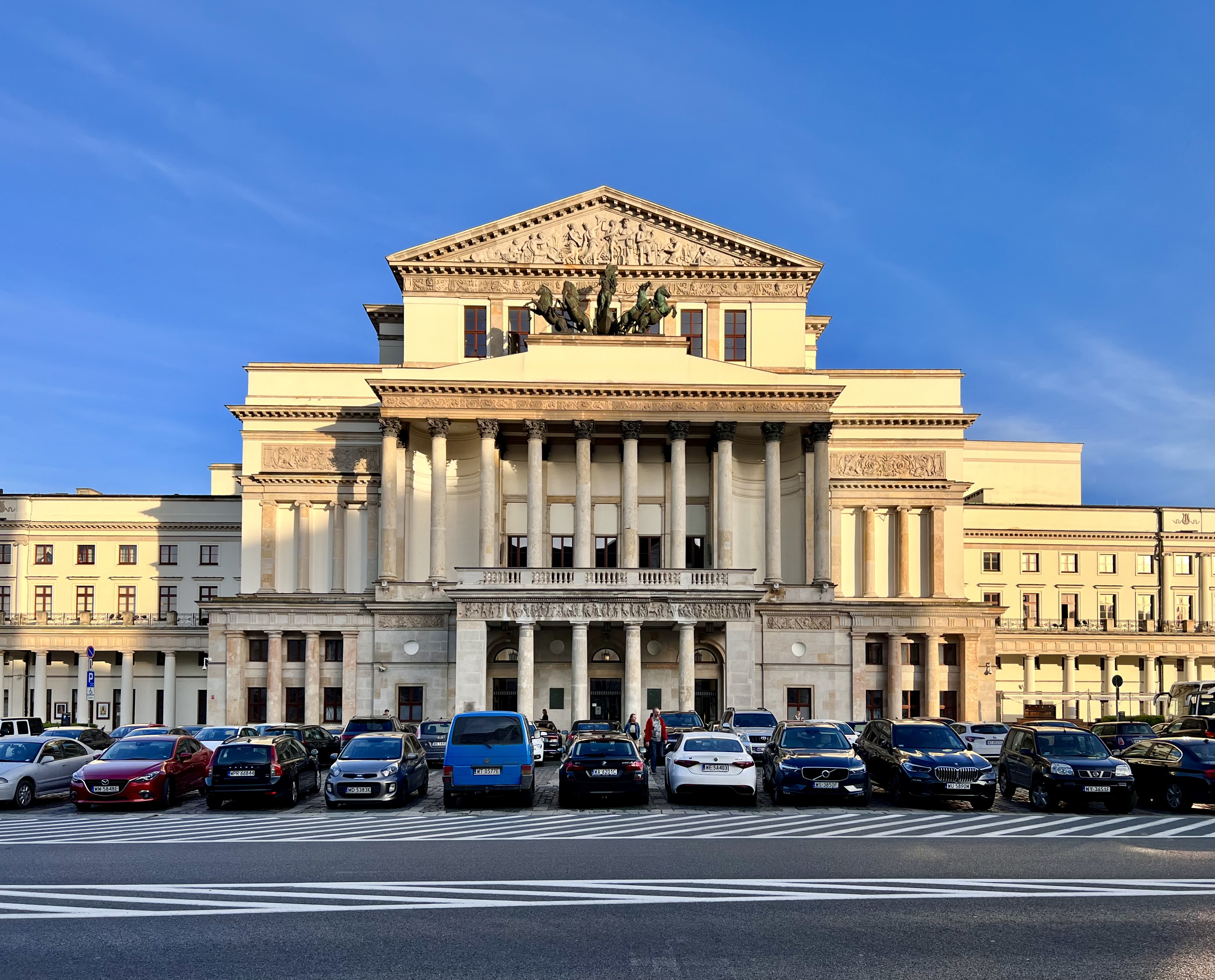
Grand Theatre, Warsaw by Antonio Corazzi, (1825–33)

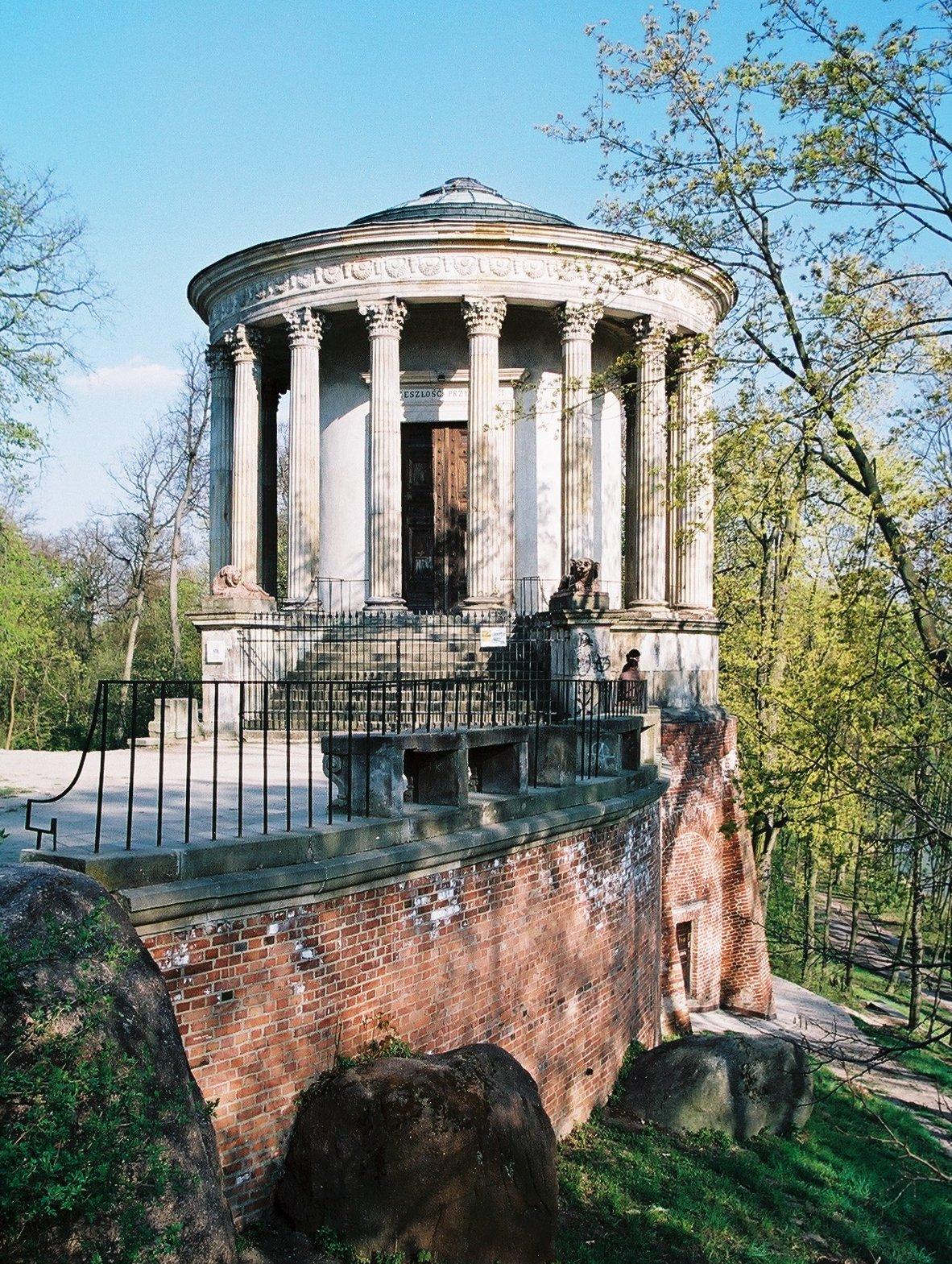
Temple of the Sibyl in Puławy landscape garden by Piotr Aigner, (1798–1801)

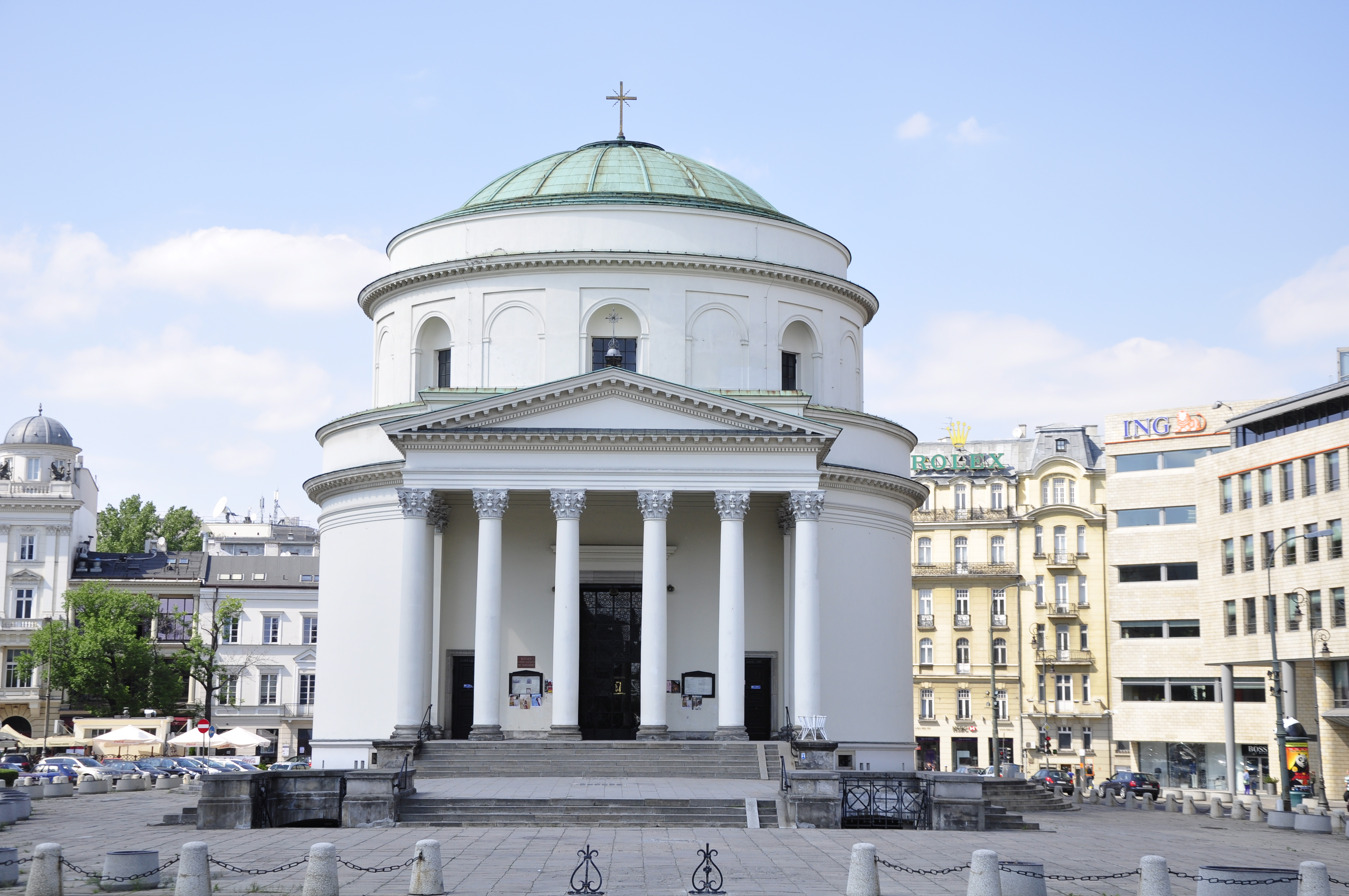
St. Alexander's Church, Warsaw by Piotr Aigner, (1818–25)

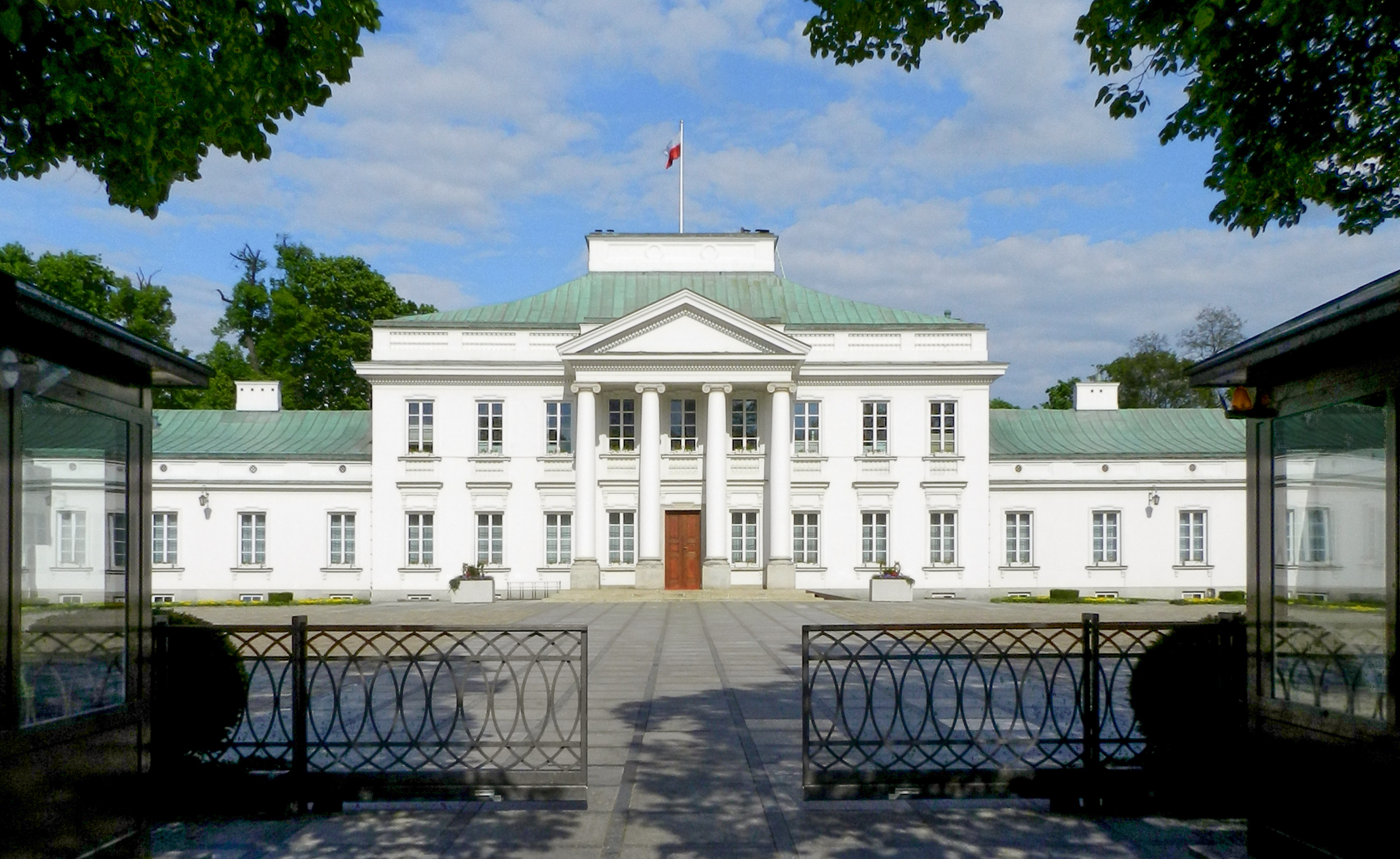
Belvedere Palace in Warsaw by Jakub Kubicki, (1819–22)

=== Russia ===
In the Russian Empire at the end of the 19th century, neoclassical architecture was equal to Saint Petersburg architecture because this style was specific for a huge number of buildings in the city. Catherine the Great adopted the style during her reign by allowing the architect Jean-Baptiste Vallin de la Mothe to build the Old Hermitage and the Imperial Academy of Arts.

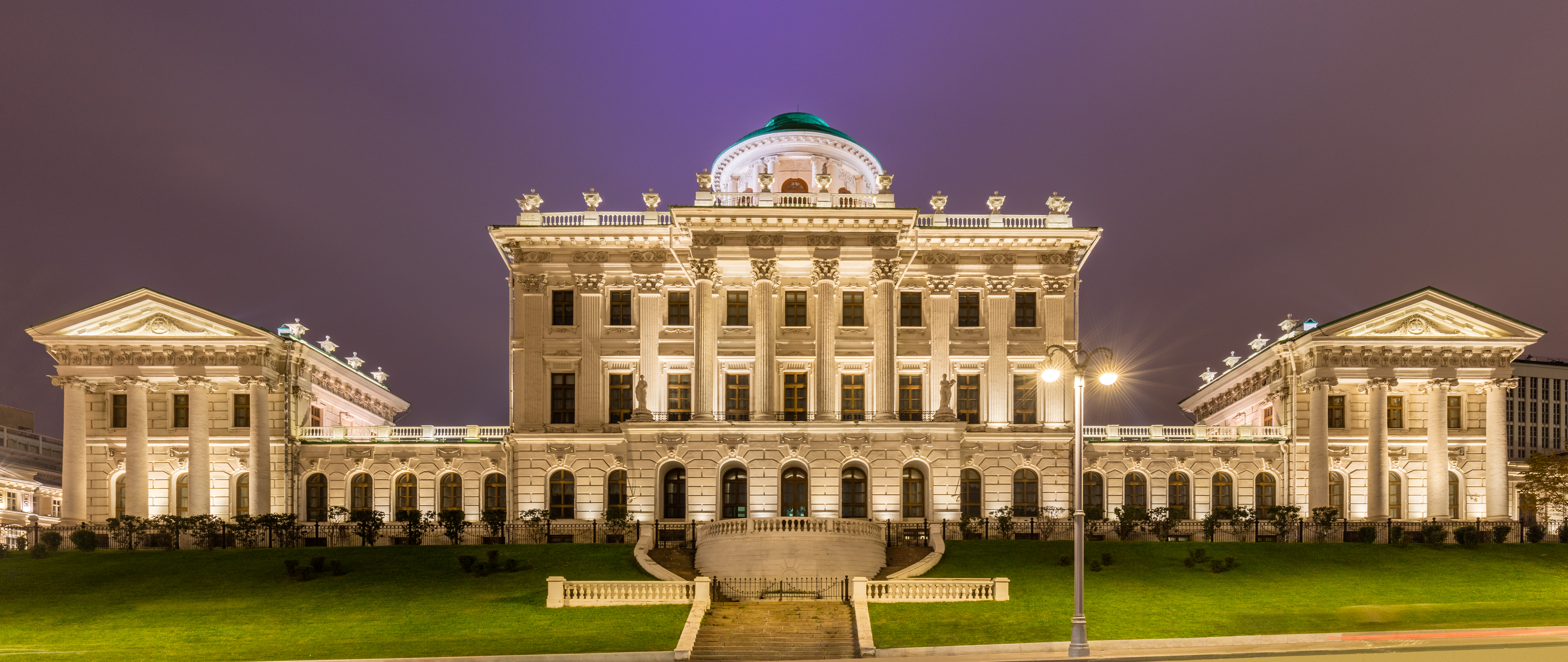
Pashkov House by Vasily Bazhenov

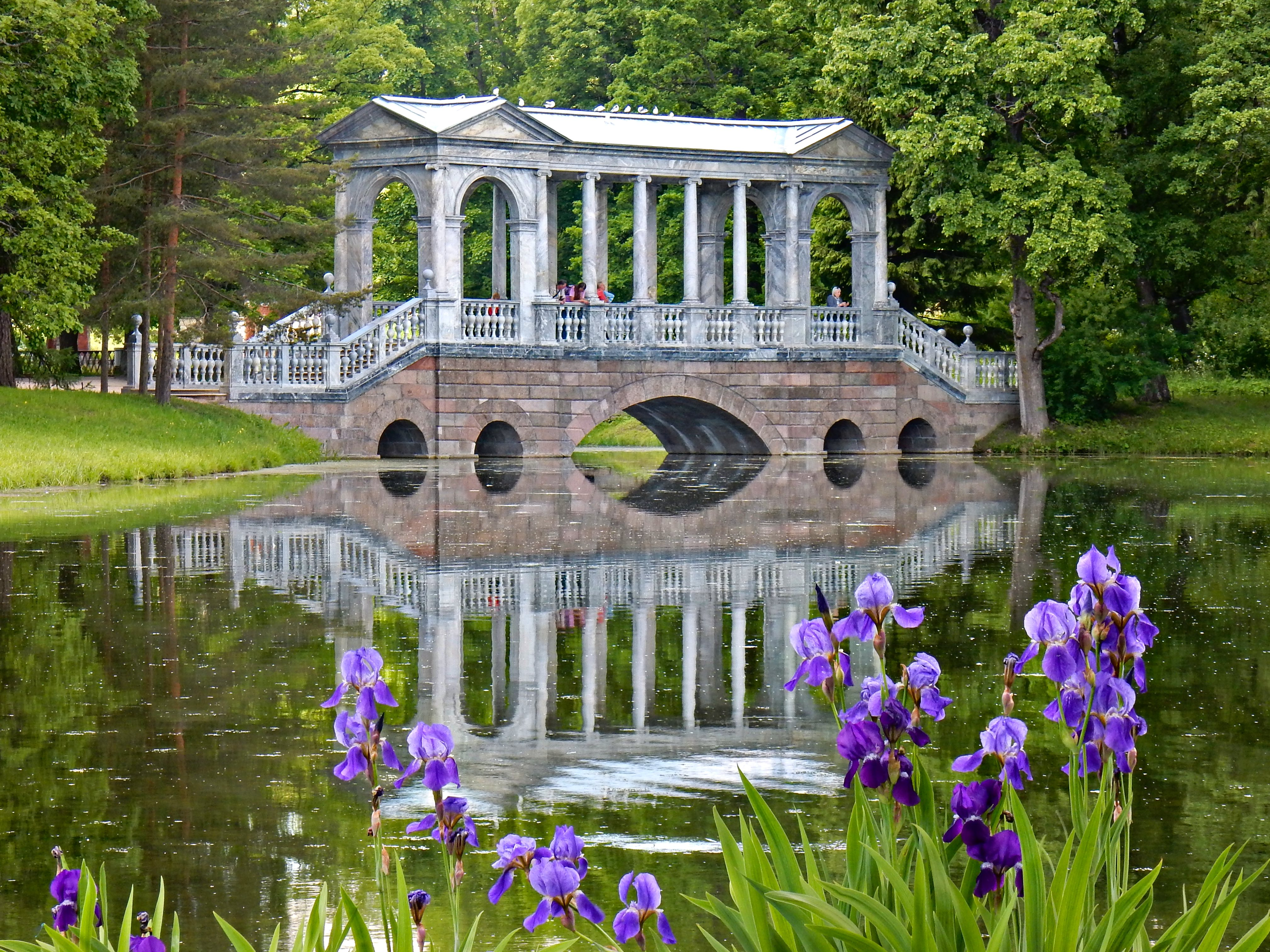
Marble Bridge, 1772, by Vasily Neyolov

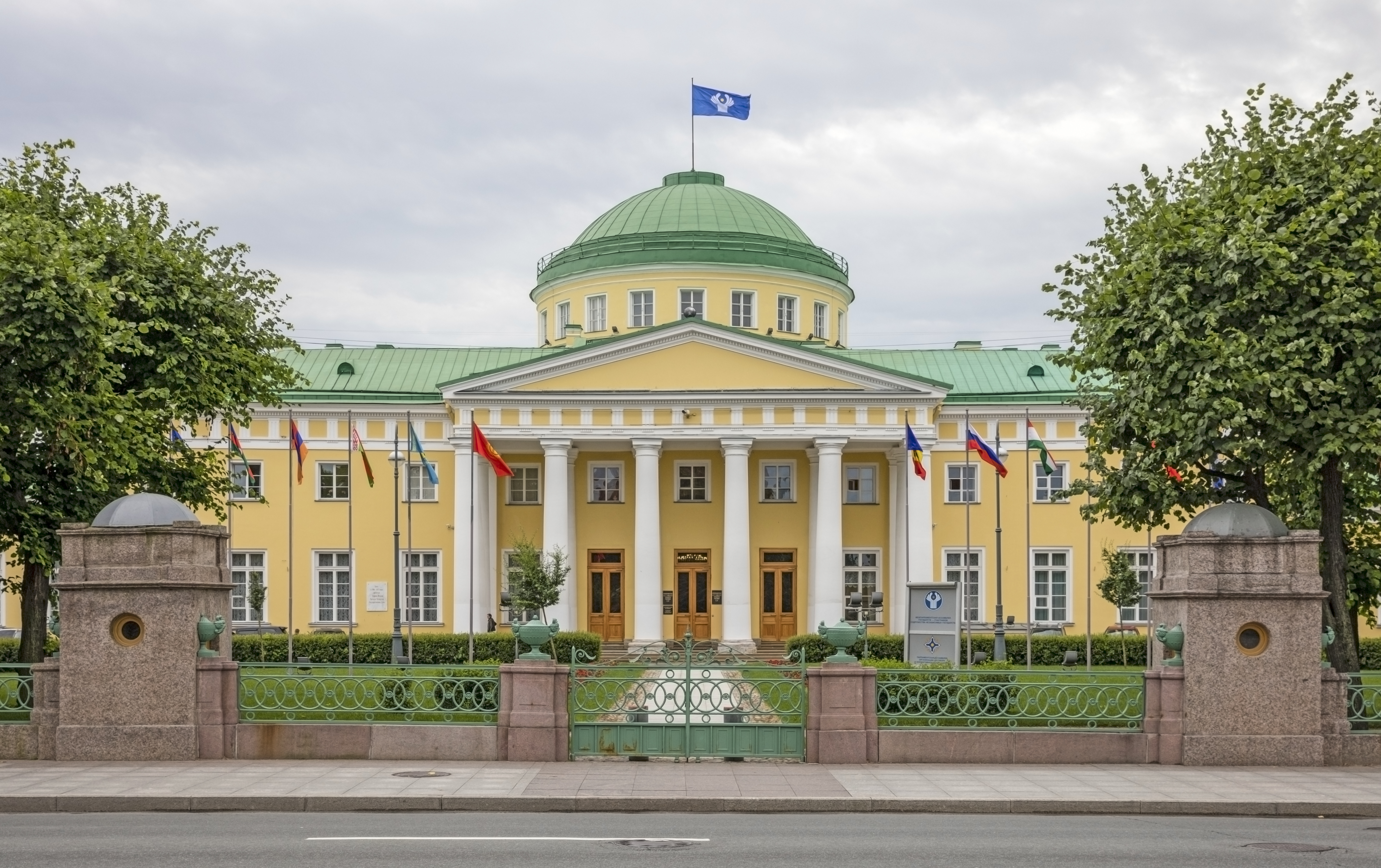
Tauride Palace, 1783–1789, by Ivan Starov

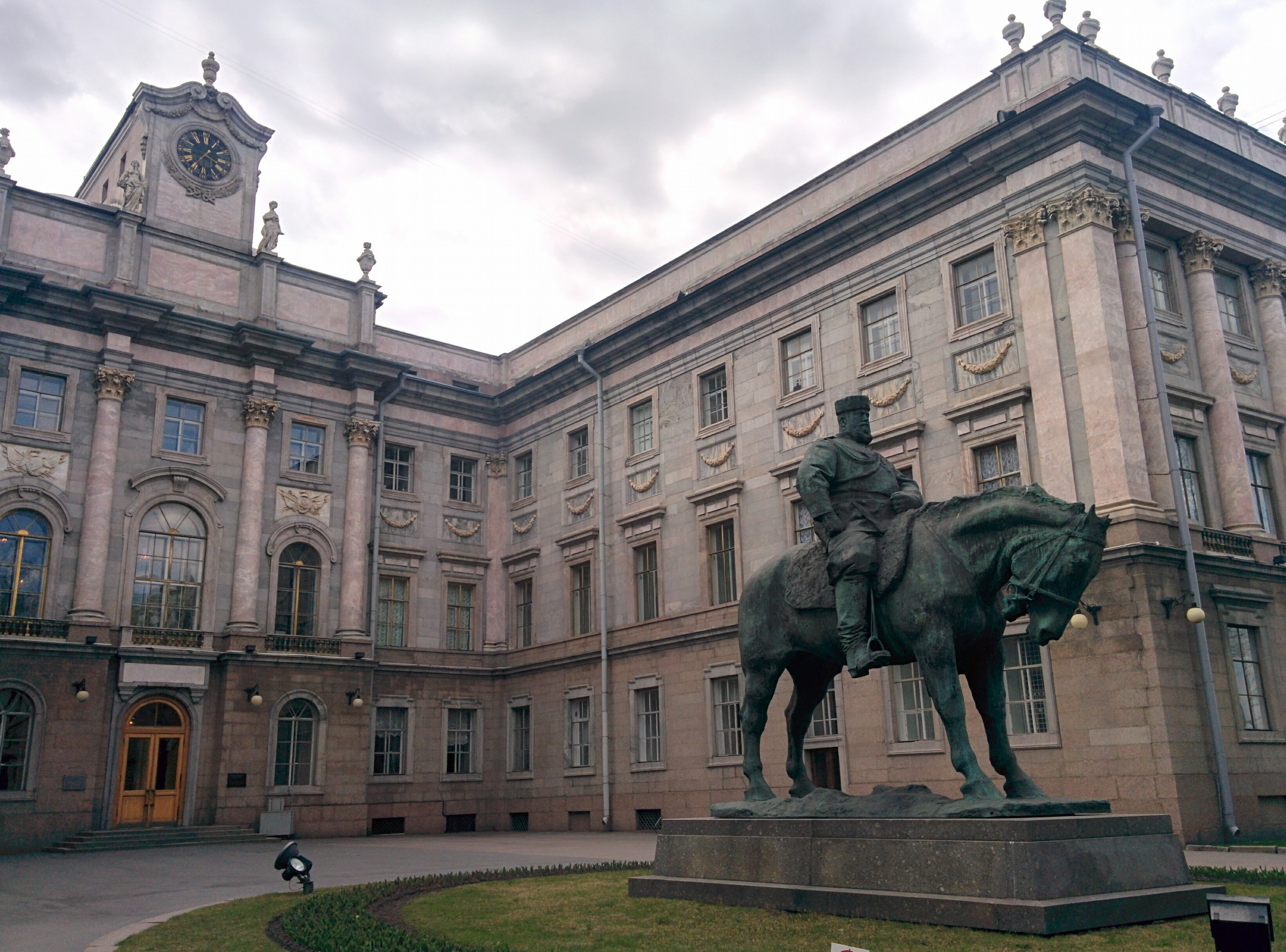
Marble Palace, 1768–1785, by Antonio Rinaldi

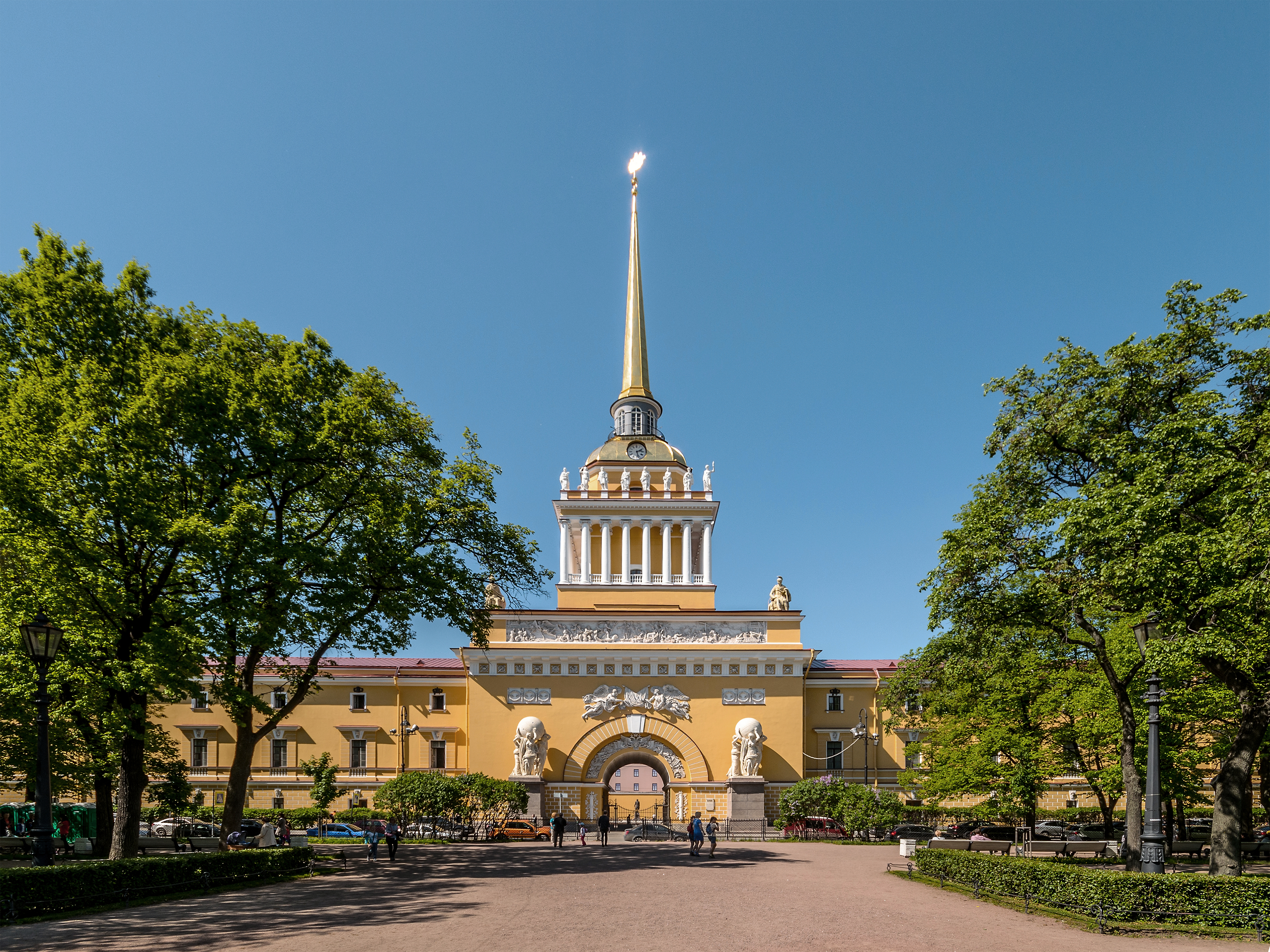
Admiralty, Saint Petersburg by Andreyan Zakharov

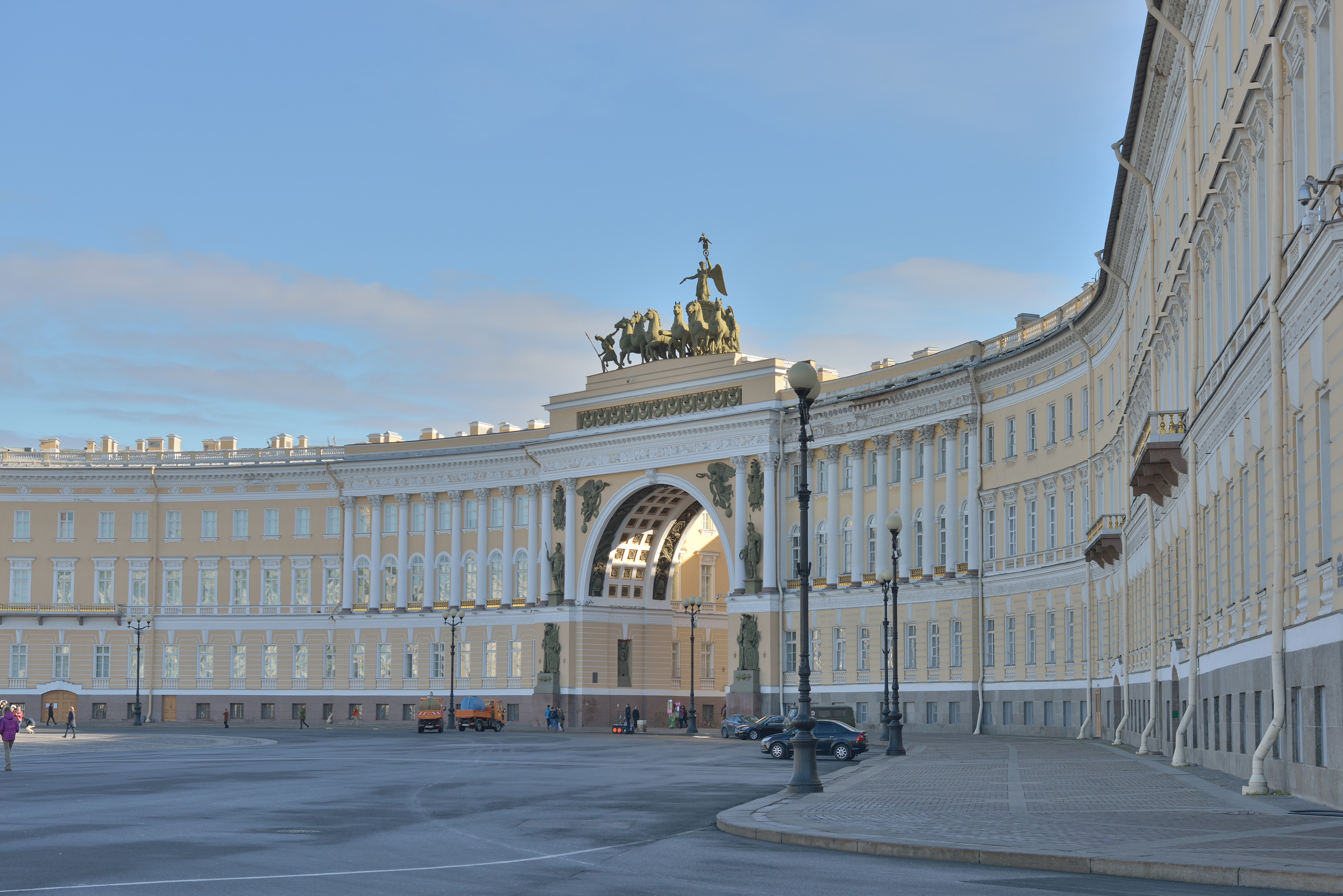
General Staff Building, 1819–1829, by Carlo Rossi

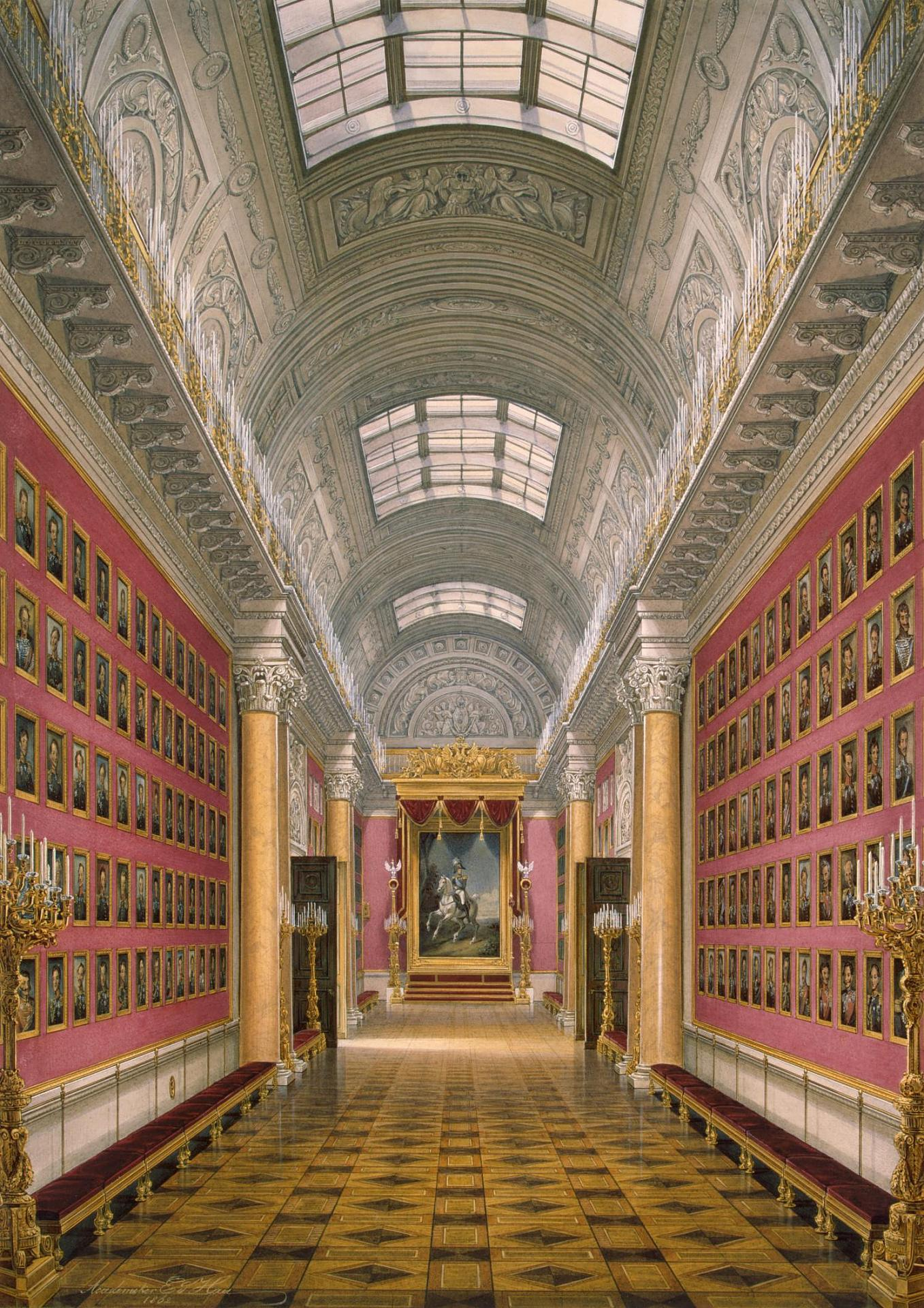
Military Gallery of the Winter Palace, 1838, by Vasily Stasov

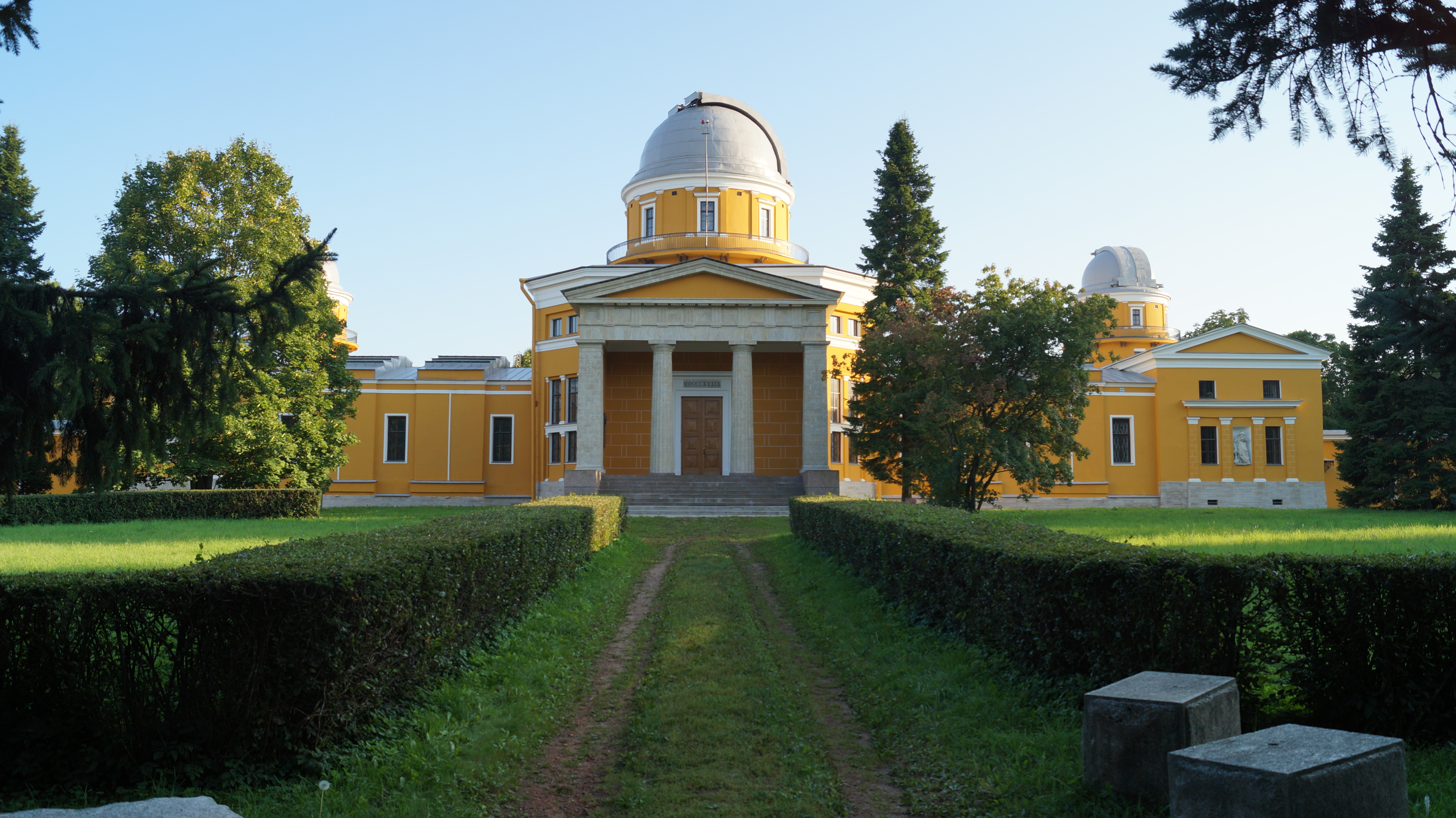
Main building of the Pulkovo Observatory, 1837, by Alexander Brullov

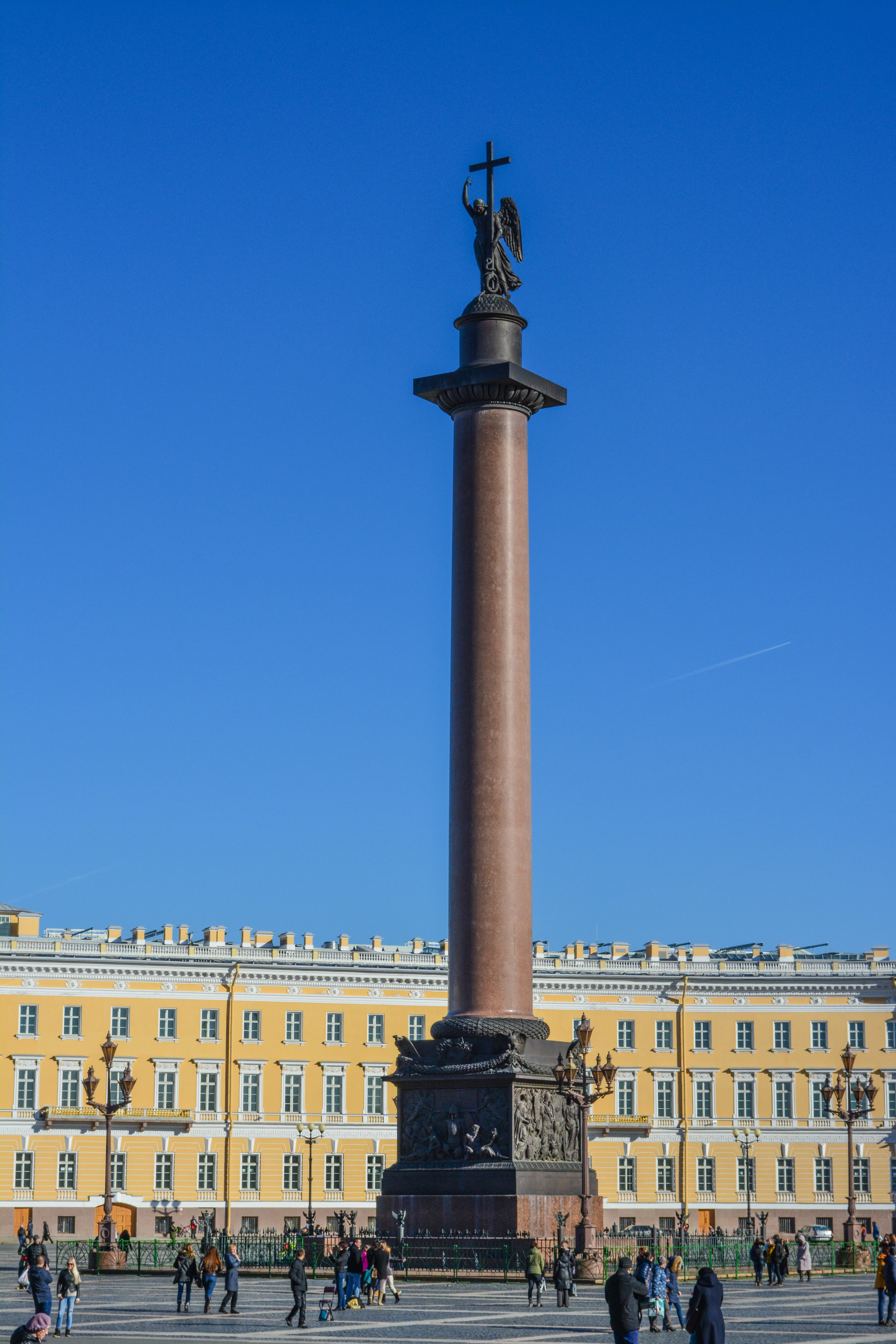
The Alexander Column at the Palace Square, by Auguste de Montferrand

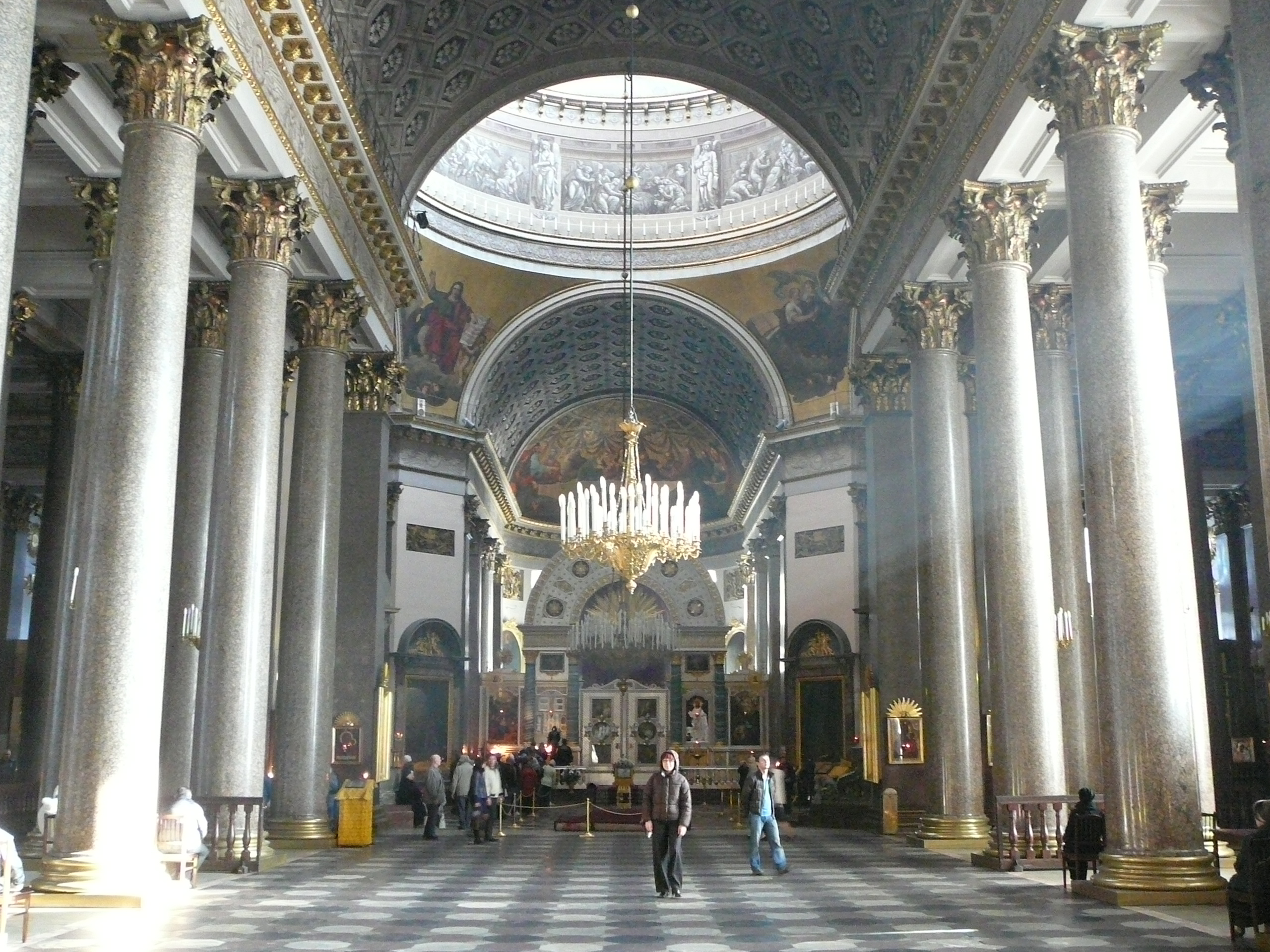
An interior of Kazan Cathedral, Saint Petersburg, by Andrey Voronikhin

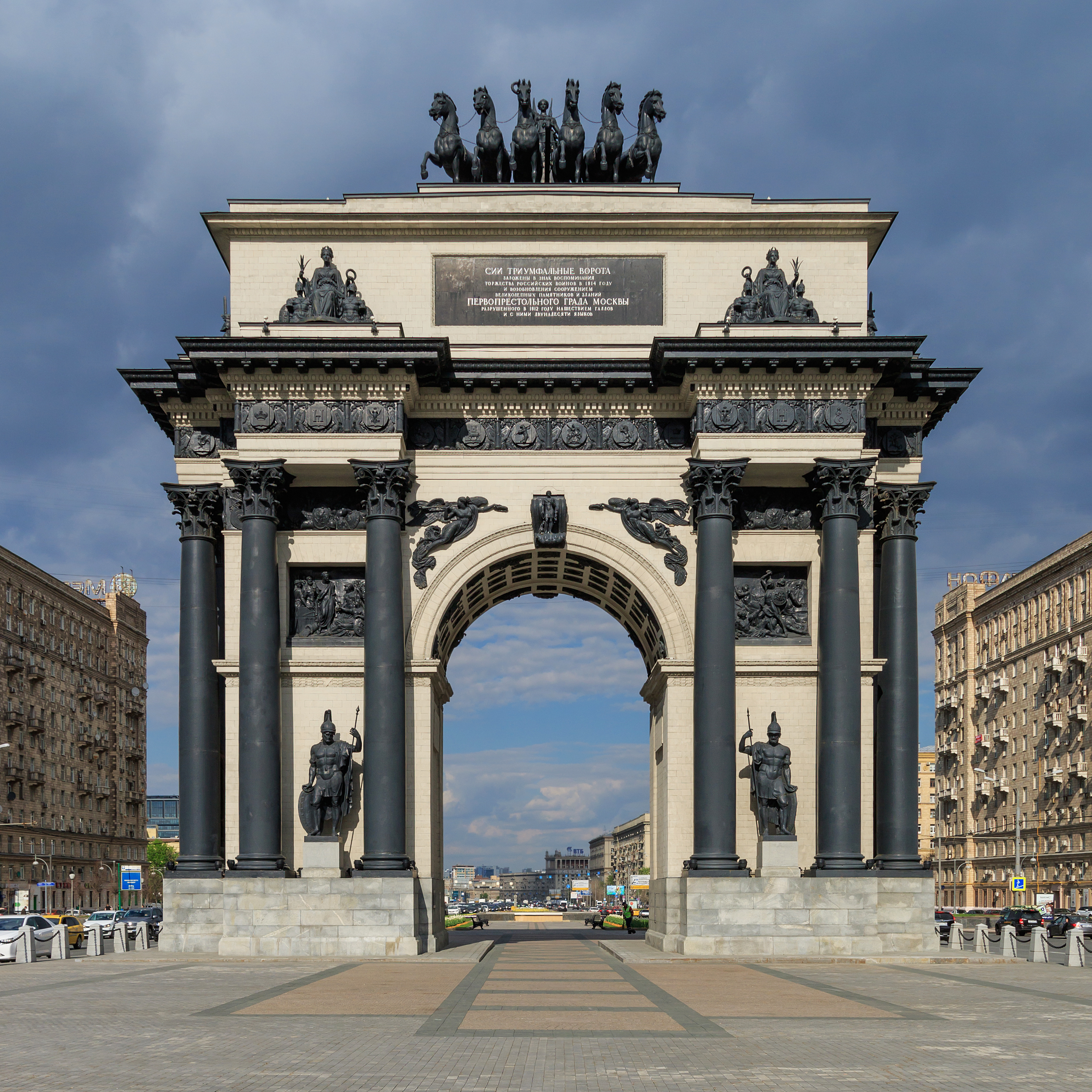
Triumphal Arch of Moscow, by Joseph Bové

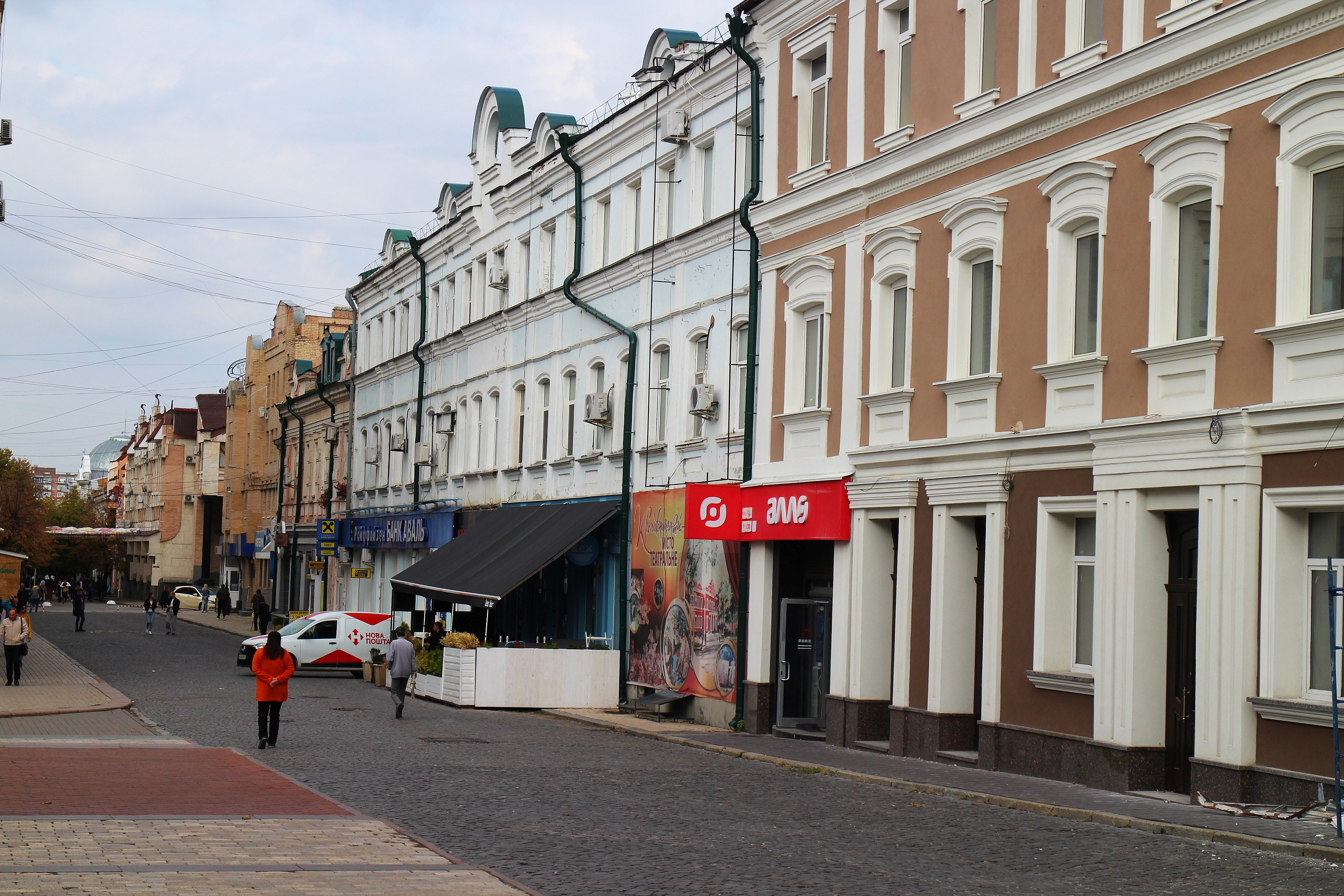
Teatralna street in Yelisavetgrad (today, Kropyvnytskyi, Ukraine)

=== Spain ===
Spanish Neoclassicism was exemplified by the work of Juan de Villanueva, who adapted Edmund Burke's theories of beauty and the sublime to the requirements of Spanish climate and history. He built the Museo del Prado, which combined three functions: an academy, an auditorium, and a museum in one building with three separate entrances.

This was part of the ambitious program of Charles III, who intended to make Madrid the Capital of the Arts and Sciences. Very close to the museum, Villanueva built the Royal Observatory of Madrid. He also designed several summer houses for the kings in El Escorial and Aranjuez and reconstructed the Plaza Mayor, Madrid, among other important works. Villanueva's pupils expanded the Neoclassical style in Spain.

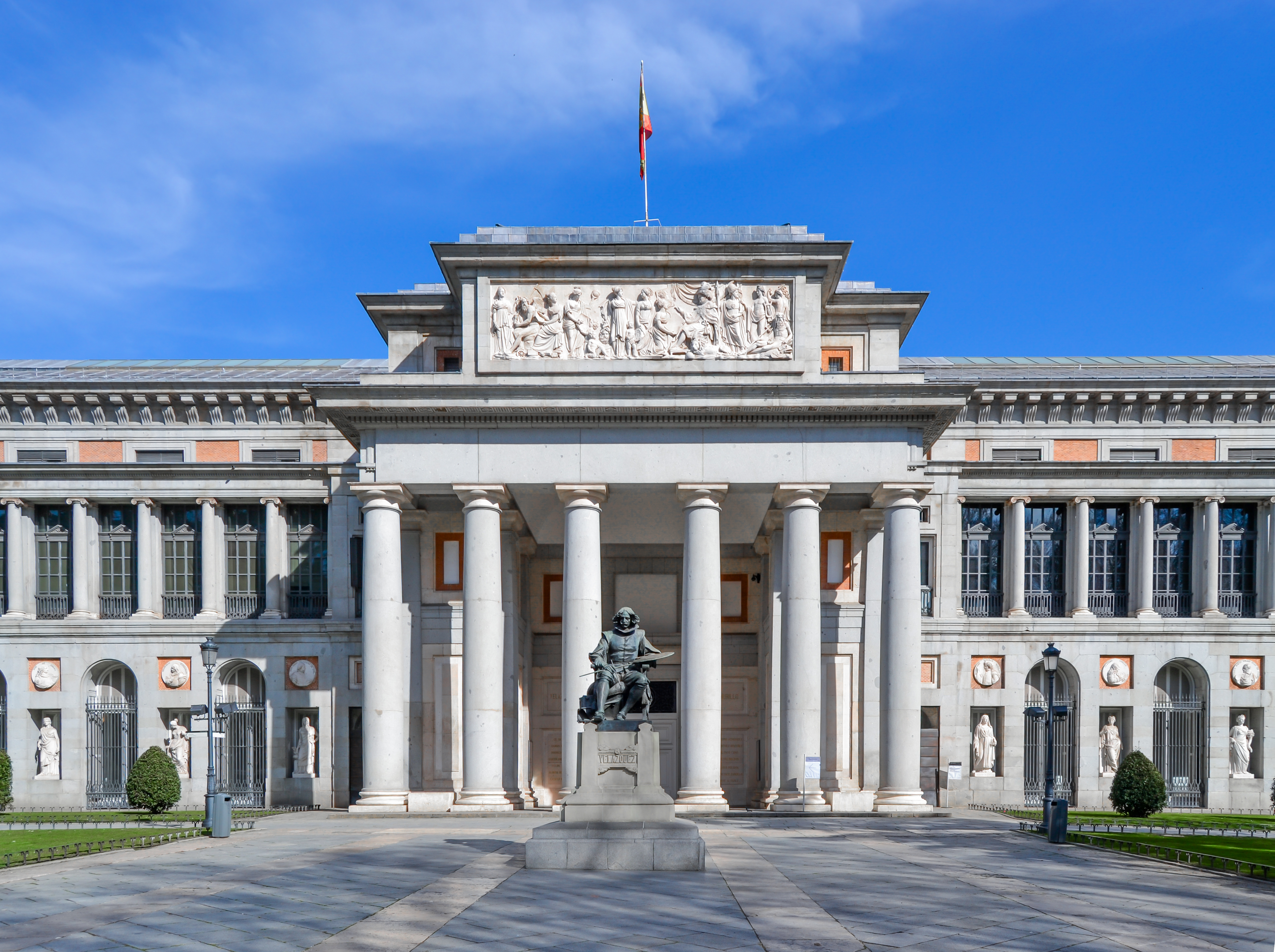
The Museo del Prado in Madrid, by Juan de Villanueva

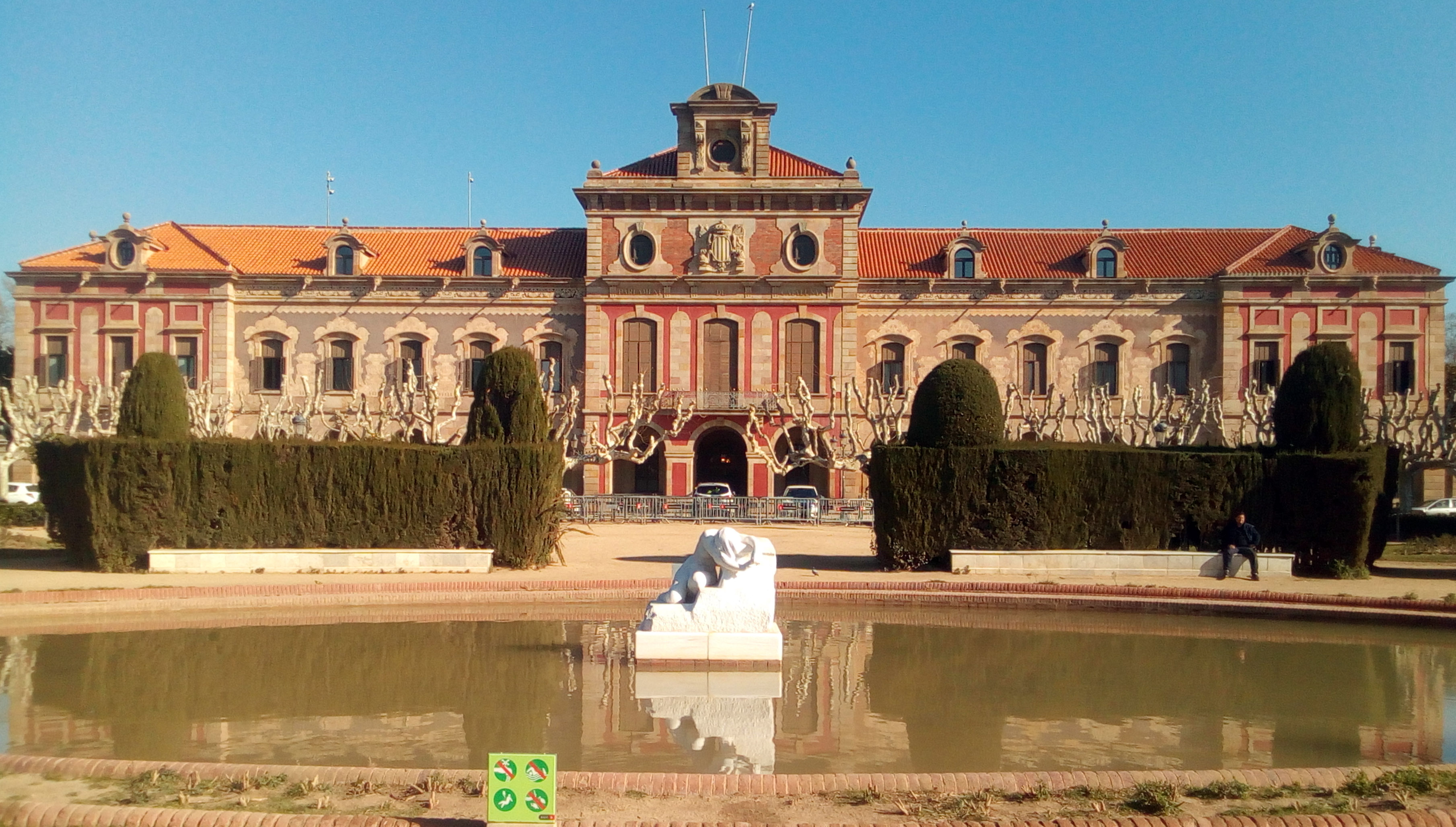
Palau del Parlament de Catalunya in Barcelona, Catalonia, built between 1716 and 1748 by Marquis of Verboom

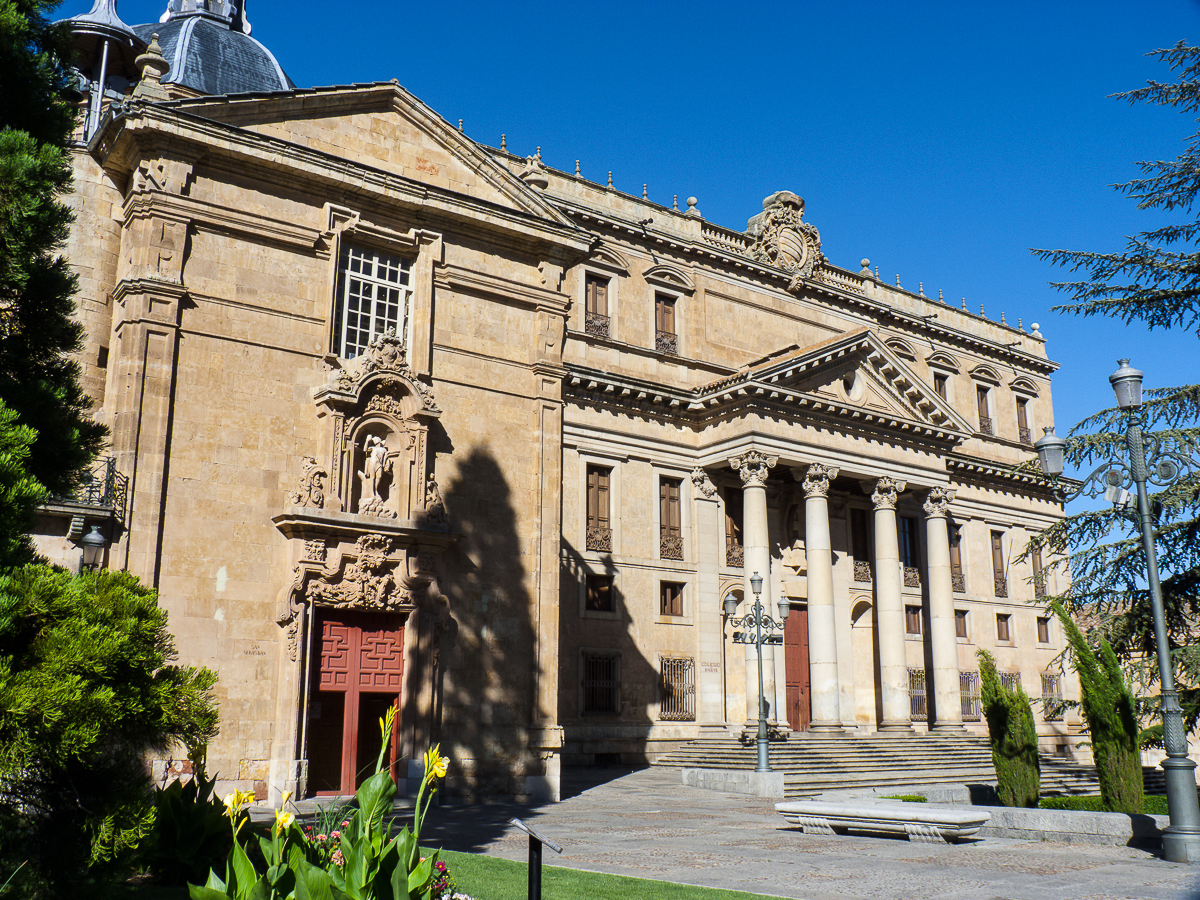
Colegio Mayor de San Bartolomé, Salamanca, Castile and León, built in 1760

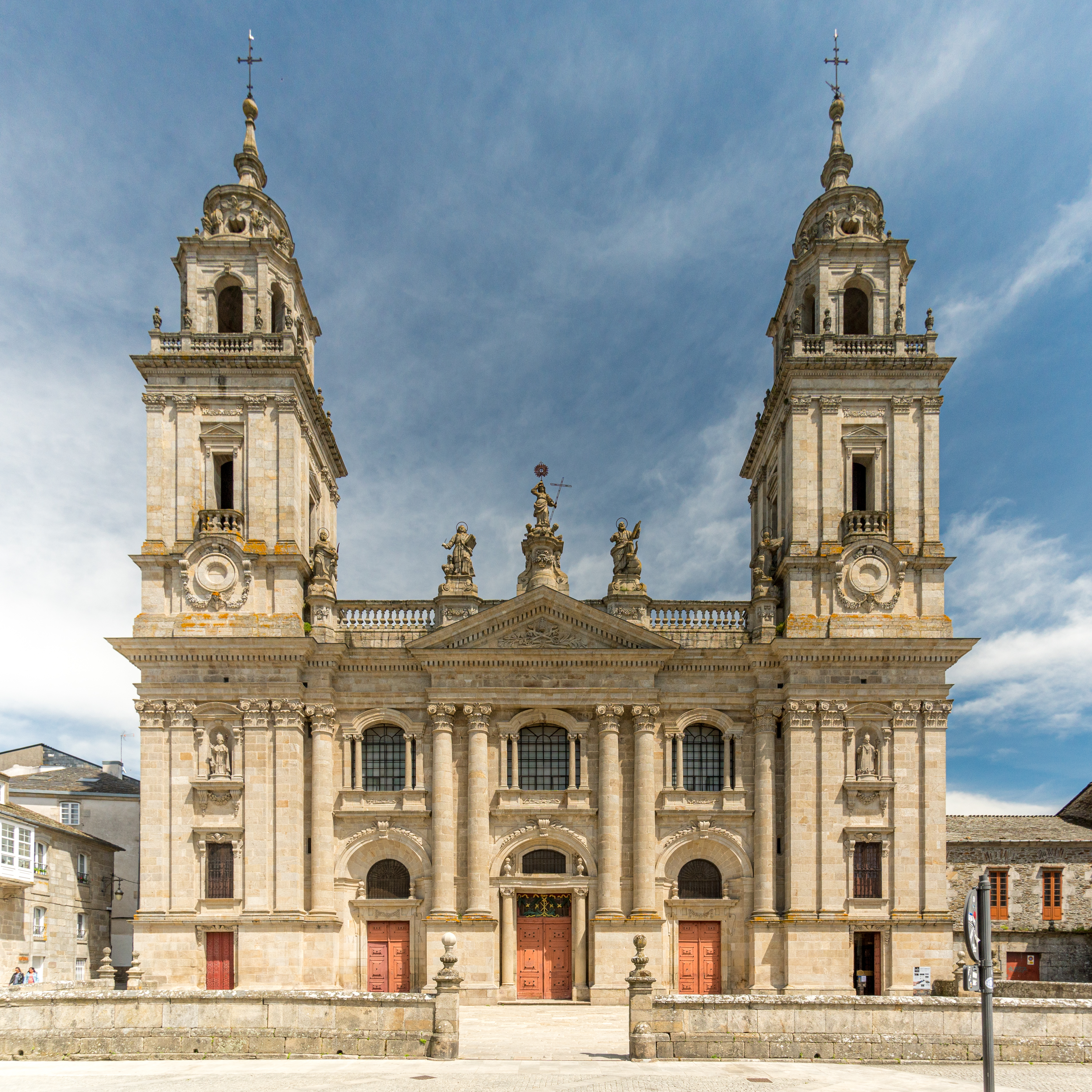
Neoclassical facade of Lugo Cathedral in Lugo, Galicia, by Julián Sánchez Bort

=== United States ===
In the new republic, Robert Adam's neoclassical manner was adapted for the local late 18th- and early 19th-century style, called Federal architecture. One of the pioneers of this style was the English-born Benjamin Henry Latrobe, who is often noted as one of America's first formally trained professional architects and the father of American architecture. The Baltimore Basilica, the first Roman Catholic cathedral in the United States, is considered by many experts to be Latrobe's masterpiece.

Another notable American architect who is identified with Federal architecture was Thomas Jefferson. He was very interested in the building he saw in Paris when he served there as ambassador, and built several neoclassical buildings, with his own innovations, including his personal estate Monticello, the Virginia State Capitol, and the University of Virginia.

A second neoclassical manner found in the United States during the 19th century was called Greek Revival architecture. It differs from Federal architecture as it strictly follows the Greek idiom; however, it was used to describe all buildings of the Neoclassical period that display classical orders.

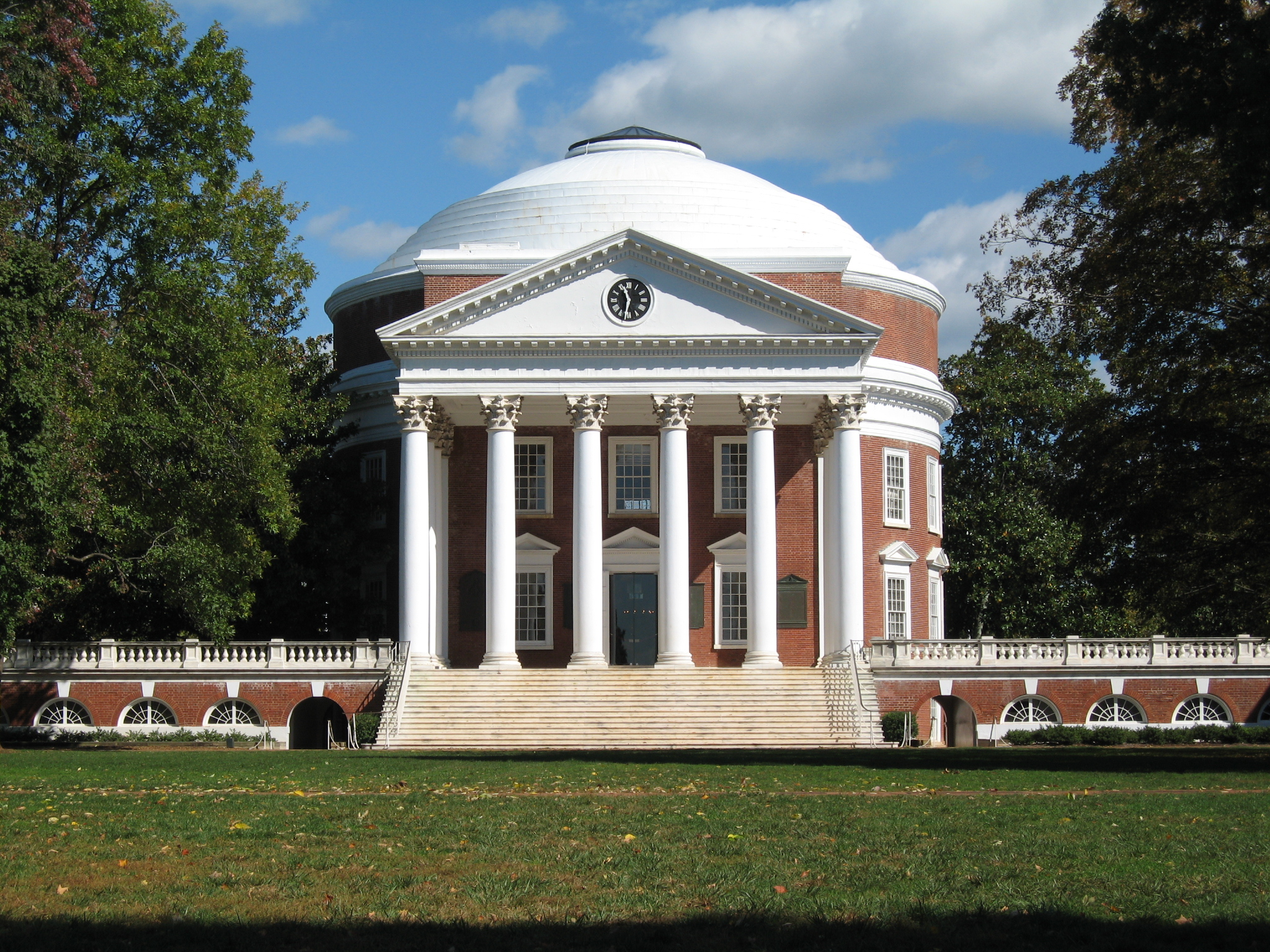
University of Virginia Rotunda, an example of the Neoclassical architecture Thomas Jefferson built on campus.

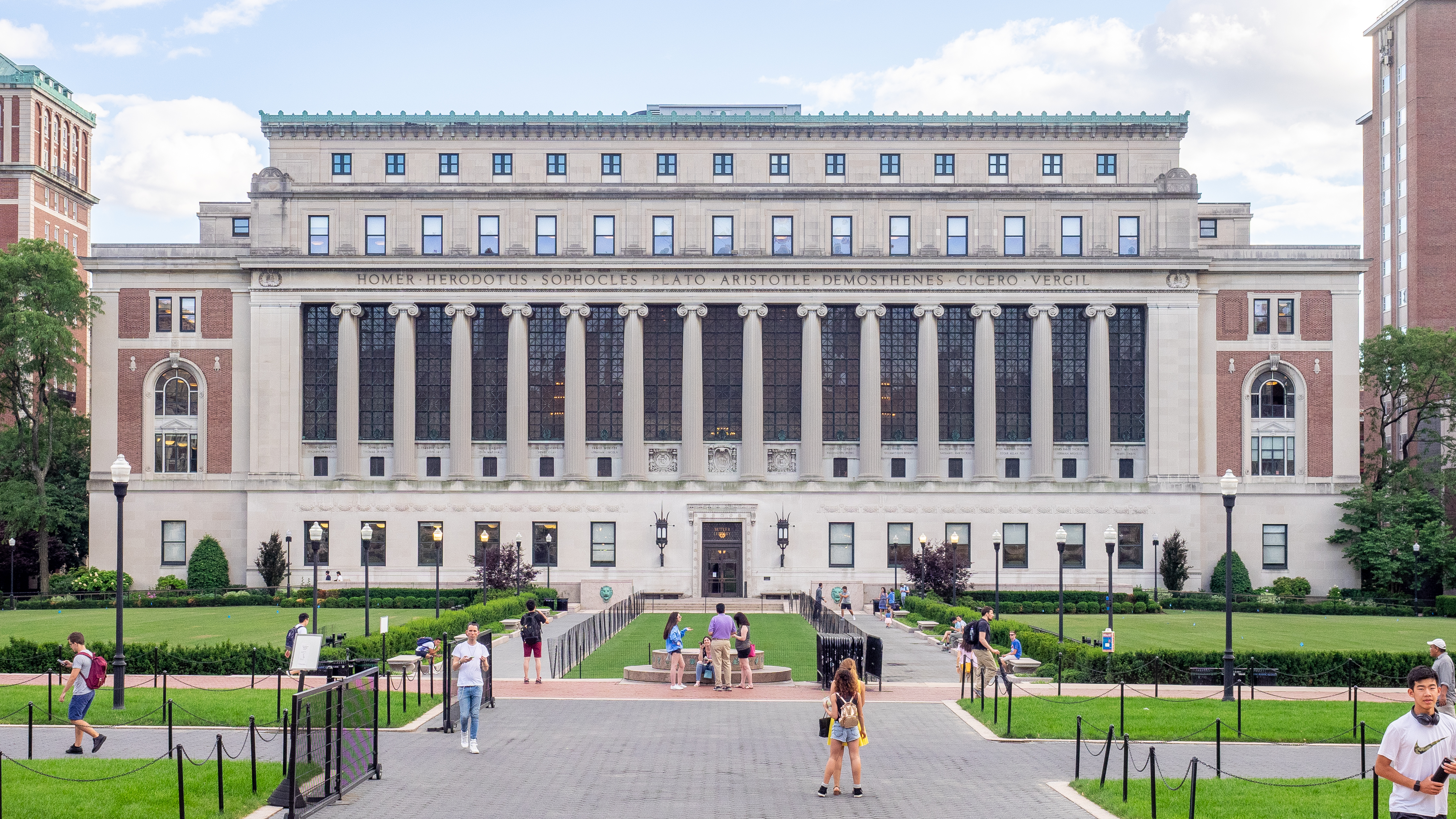
Butler Library at Columbia University in New York City (finished in 1934)

East and west sides of the United States Capitol. It was originally finished in 1800, and was greatly rebuilt in subsequent decades. The dome was added in 1855–1866.

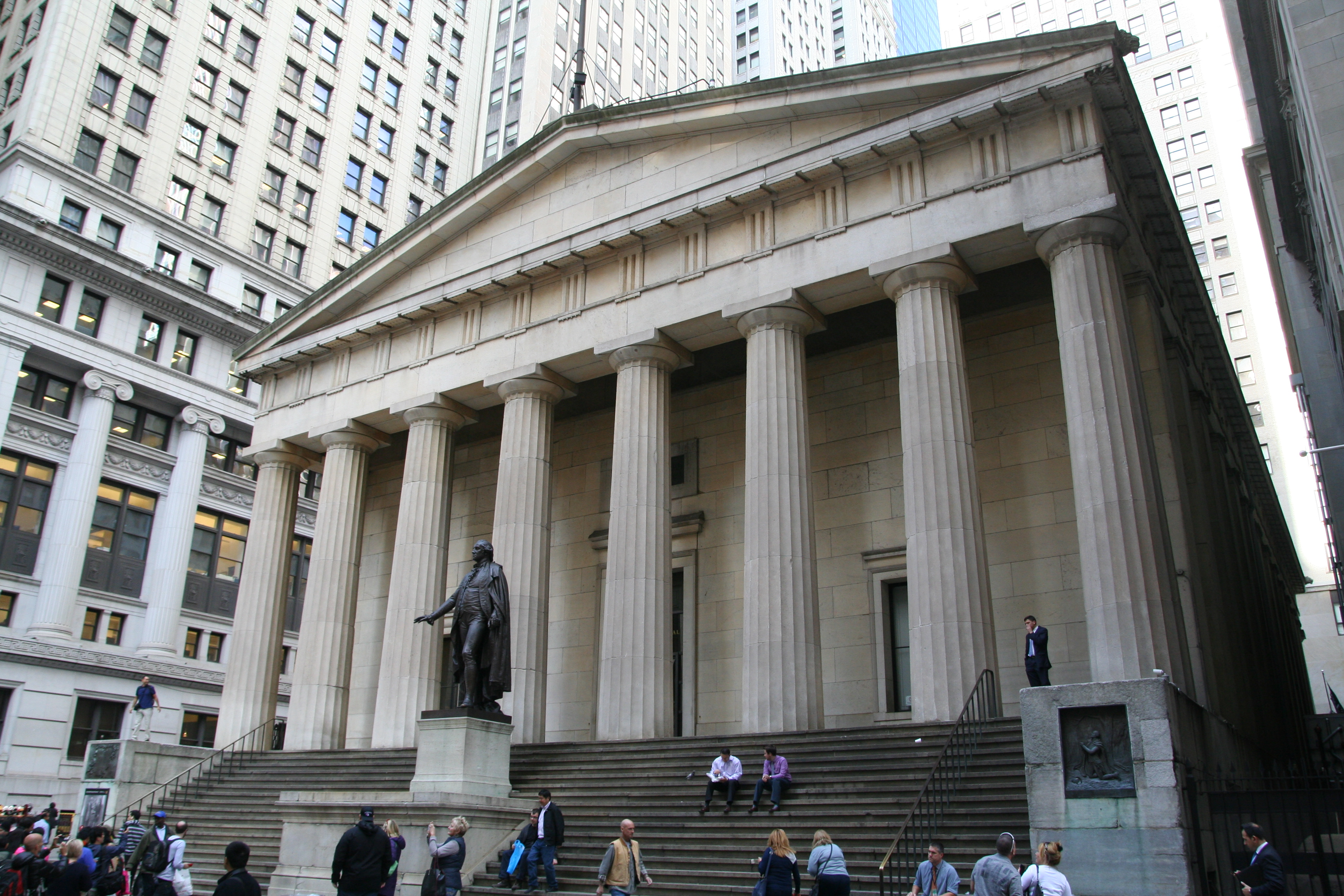
Federal Hall National Memorial (1842)

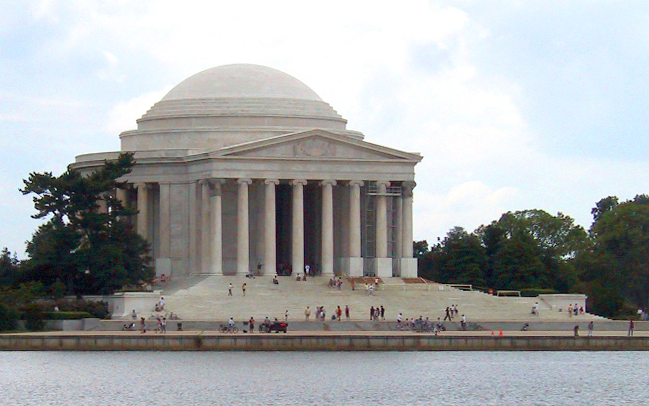
Jefferson Memorial in Washington D.C (1939–1943)

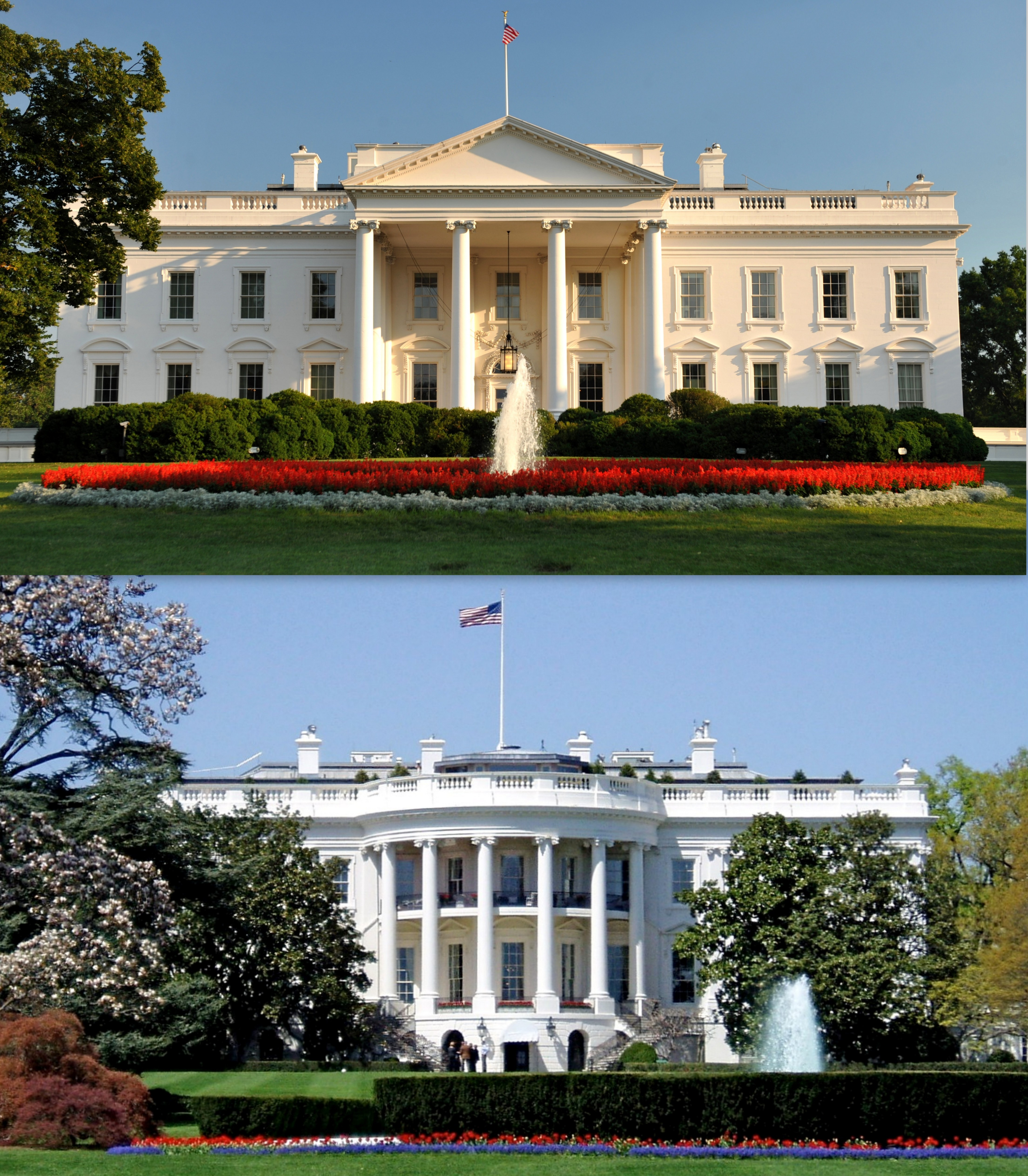
North and south sides of the White House (completed in 1800)

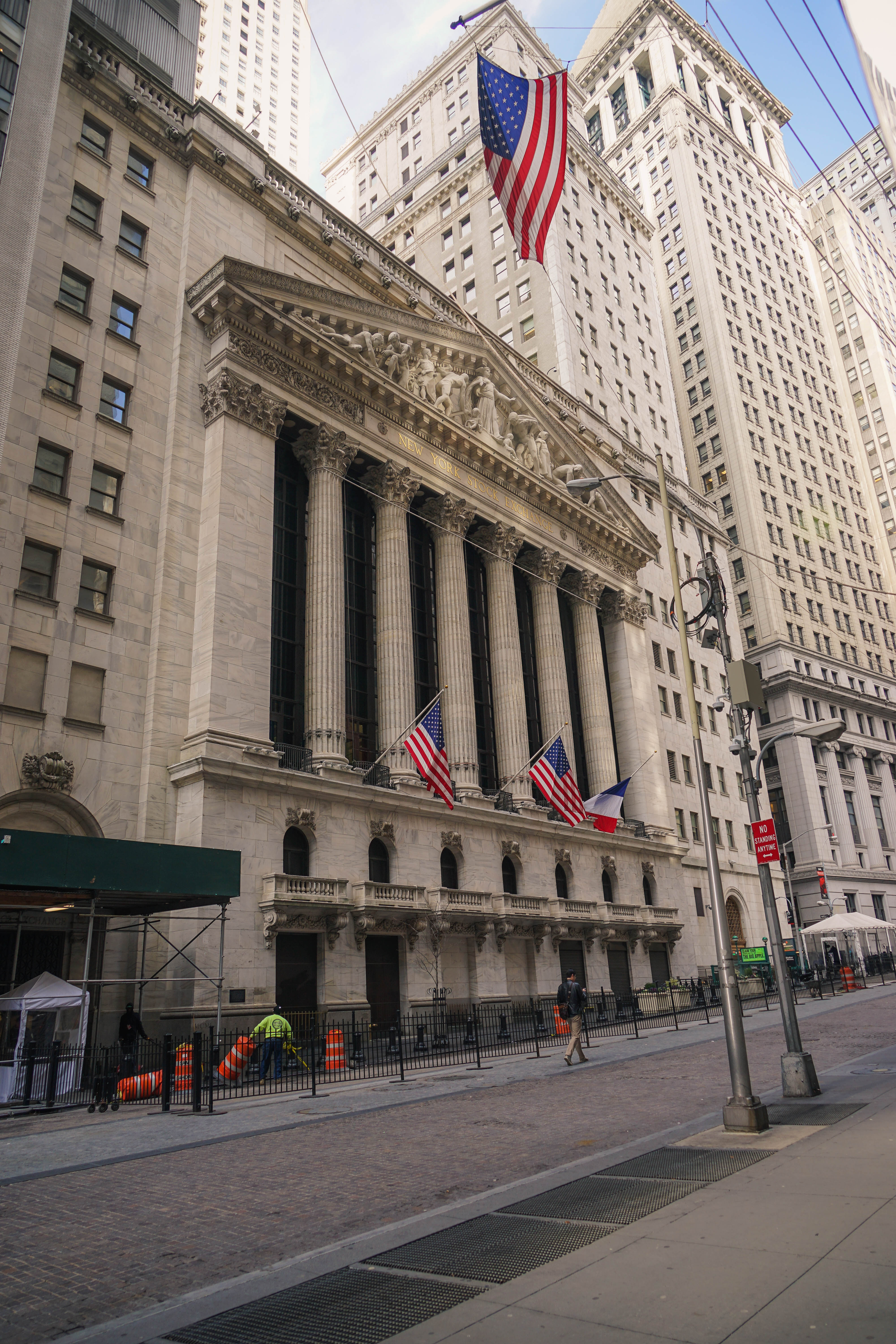
The New York Stock Exchange Building was originally finished in 1903, and was expanded decades later.

Front view of the Huntington City Hall, in Huntington, West Virginia (completed in 1915)

== See also ==
- Federal architecture
- New classical architecture
- Outline of classical architecture
- Nordic Classicism
- Stripped Classicism
- List of architectural styles
