= Andries =

Andries is a Dutch and Afrikaans masculine given name or surname equivalent to Andrew.

== Given name ==
People with this name include

- Andries van Artvelt (1590–1652), Flemish painter
- Andries Beeckman (1628–1664), Dutch painter
- Andries Bekker (born 1983), South African rugby player
- Andries Benedetti (1615–1669), Flemish Baroque painter.
- Andries Bicker (1586–1652), Dutch merchant, leader of the Arminians, and VOC administrator
- Andries Boelens (1455–1519), Dutch mayor of Amsterdam
- Andries Bonger (1861–1936), Dutch artist, brother-in-law of Vincent van Gogh
- Andries Bosman (1621–1681), Flemish priest and painter,
- Andries Both (1612–1642), Dutch genre painter
- Andries Botha (c. 1800–c. 1870), South African leader of the Khoi people
- Andries Botha (born 1952), South African artist and political activist
- Andries Brink (1877–1947), South African military commander
- Andries Brouwer (born 1951), Dutch mathematician and computer programmer
- Andries Burger (born 1981), Namibian cricketer
- Andries Carpentière (1672–1737), Dutch or French sculptor active in Britain
- Andries Cloete , South African tenor
- Andries Coetzee (born 1970s), South African linguist
- Andries Coetzee (born 1990), South African rugby player
- Andries van Cuijk (ca.1070–1139), Dutch bishop of Utrecht
- Andries van Dam (born 1938), Dutch-born American computer scientist
- Andries Danielsz. (c. 1580 – aft. 1640), Flemish flower painter
- Andries du Plessis (1910–1979), South African pole vaulter
- Andries van Eertvelt (1590–1652), Flemish painter, draughtsman and engraver
- Andries Ferreira (born 1990), South African rugby player
- Andries Gous (born 1993), South African cricketer
- Andries de Graeff (1611–1678), Dutch finance minister and mayor of Amsterdam
- Andries Cornelis Dirk de Graeff (1872–1957), Dutch minister for foreign affairs and Governor General of Dutch East Indies
- Andries Hendrik van Hasselt (1806–1874), Dutch-Belgian writer and poet
- Andries Hoogerwerf (1906–1977), Dutch athlete, naturalist, ornithologist and conservationist
- Andries Hoogerwerf (political scientist) (1931–2024), Dutch political scientist and public administration scholar
- Andries van Hoorn (1600–1660s), Dutch mayor of Haarlem
- Andries Hudde (1608–1663), Dutch landowner and colonial official of New Netherland
- Andries Jonker (born 1962), Dutch football player and manager
- Andries Kinsbergen (1926–2016), Belgian lawyer and politician
- Andries Lambert (ca.1844–1894), Nama leader
- Andries Mac Leod (1891–1977), Belgian-Swedish philosopher and mathematician
- Andries Malan (born 1994), South African badminton player
- Andries Maseko (1955–2013), South African footballer
- Andries Mpondo (born 1963), South African footballer
- Andries Nel (born 1965), South African government minister
- Andries Nieman (born 1972), South African boxer
- Andries Colyns de Nole (1598–1638), Flemish sculptor
- Andries Noppert (born 1994), Dutch footballer
- Andries Pels (1631–1681), Dutch playwright and poet
- Andries Pels (1655–1731), Dutch banker and insurer
- Andries Pevernage (1542–1591), Flemish composer
- Andries Jan Pieters (1916–1952), Dutch collaborator with Nazis who was executed for war crimes
- Andries Hendrik Potgieter (1792–1852), South African Voortrekker and politician
- Andries Pretorius (1798–1853), South African Boer leader after whom Pretoria is named
- Andries Pretorius (born 1985), South African rugby player in Wales
- Andries Putter (1935–2014), South African military commander
- Andries Sanders (born 1933), Dutch psychologist
- Andries Jacobsz Stock (1580–1648), Flemish engraver, printmaker and illustrator
- Andries Stockenström (1792–1864), South African governor
- Andries Stockenström (1844–1880), South African judge, son of the above
- Andries van Straaden (1853–1919), pen name of Austrian writer Johannes Kaltenboeck
- Andries Strauss (born 1984), South African rugby player
- Andries Tatane (1978–2011), South African civil rights activist
- Andries Teeuw (1921–2012), Dutch critic of Indonesian literature
- Andries Treurnicht (1921–1993), South African Conservative politician
- Andries Vaillant (1655–1693), Dutch engraver and painter
- Andries Van Aarde (1951–2024), South African theologist
- Andries Van den Abeele (born 1935), Belgian historical preservationist
- Andries van der Merwe (born 1994), South African sprinter
- Andries Venter (born 1986), South African rugby player
- Andries Vermeulen (1763–1814), Dutch painter
- Andries Vierlingh (1507–1579), Dutch dyke builder and polder creator
- Andries Waterboer (1789–1852), South African Griqua people leader
- Andries de Witt (1573–1637), Grand Pensionary of Holland

== Surname ==
People with this name include

- Blaise Andries (born 1998), American NFL player
- Dennis Andries (born 1953), British former professional boxer
- Elena Andries (born 1994), Romanian weightlifter
- Jef Andries (1919–2006), Belgian footballer
- Koen Andries, Belgian professor
- Nick Andries (born 1990), American open-wheel racing driver

== See also ==
- Sint-Andries, suburb of Bruges in Belgium
