= Communication Museum =

Communication Museum, Communications Museum, Museum of Communication or other variations may refer to:

- National Communication Museum, Melbourne, Australia
- Museum of Communication Hamburg, Germany
- Museum of Communication Frankfurt, Germany
- Museum of Communication (Nuremberg), Germany
- Sandesh Museum of Communication, Bangalore, India
- Communications Museum (Macau)
- Museum of Communication (Bern), Switzerland
- Herbert H. Warrick Jr. Museum of Communications, Seattle, United States

== See also ==
- Victorian Telecommunications Museum, Melbourne, Australia
- Wireless Hill Telecommunications Museum, Perth, Western Australia
- Communication History Museum, Kaunas, Lithuania
- Museum of Post and Telecommunications, Polhov Gradec, Slovenia
- The Museum of Communication History in Uzbekistan, Tashkent
