= Museum für Kommunikation =

Museum für Kommunikation ("Communications Museum") is the name of several museums in German-speaking countries, including:

== Germany ==
- Museum für Kommunikation Frankfurt
- Museum für Kommunikation Hamburg
- Museum für Kommunikation Nürnberg
- Philatelic Archive in Bonn
- Other postal museums in Germany

== Switzerland ==
- Museum für Kommunikation Bern, winner of the 2019 European Museum of the Year Award
