= Alexander Kircher =

German painter

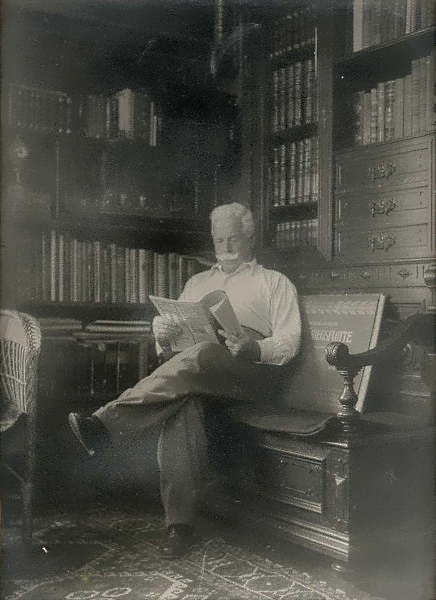
- Alexander Kircher in his library, after 1935
- Born: 26 February 1867; Trieste, Austro-Hungarian Empire
- Died: 16 September 1939 (aged 72); Berlin, Germany
- Known for: Marine and landscape paintings, drawings and illustrations
- Movement: 1904 from Trieste to Dresden (Saxony), Germany
- Awards: Spanish Order of Isabella the Catholic
- Patrons: Emperor Franz Joseph I and Emperor Wilhelm II

Alexander Kircher (Trieste, 26 February 1867 – 16 September 1939, Berlin) was an Austrian-German marine and landscape painter and illustrator. Many of his paintings can be seen in museums in Germany, Austria, Croatia, and Slovenia while others are held by private owners in those same countries, as well as the United States of America, Great Britain, Scandinavia, and Greece.

From time to time Kircher's paintings are presented for sale at such leading auction houses as Christie's and Bonhams in London, Sotheby's in New York, the Burchard Galleries in St. Petersburg, Florida, Stahl Hamburg, Van Ham Cologne, the Dorotheum in Vienna, and several others.

The artist signed the majority of his paintings "Alex Kircher", sometimes adding the year of their creation. The Bergmann Auction House in Erlangen, Germany, maintains a directory of Kircher's various signature styles.

== Life ==
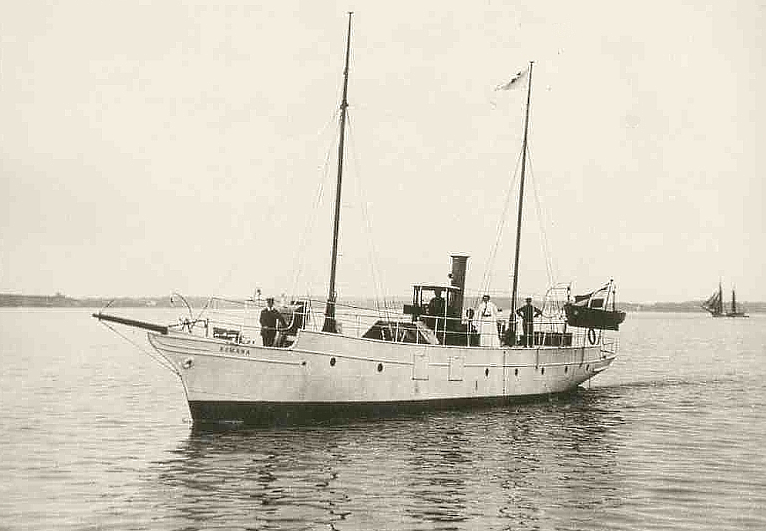
Kircher and his wife aboard his motor yacht Romana, about 1910

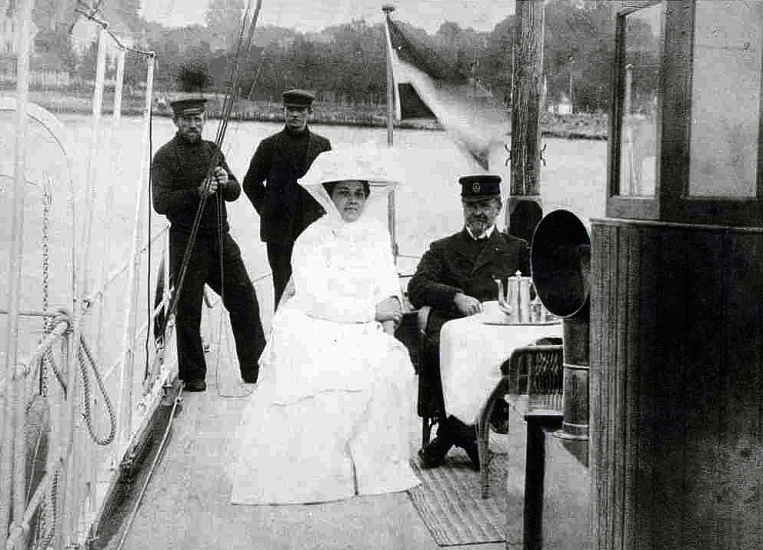
Coffee time aboard the Romana, about 1910

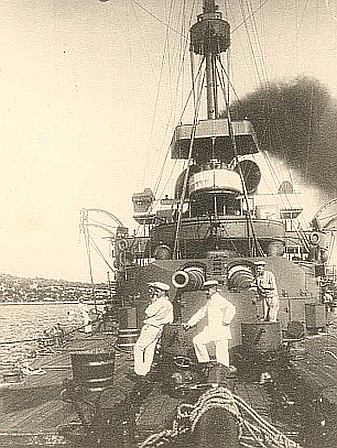
Kircher on the bow of SMS Budapest during buoy manoeuvres in 1902

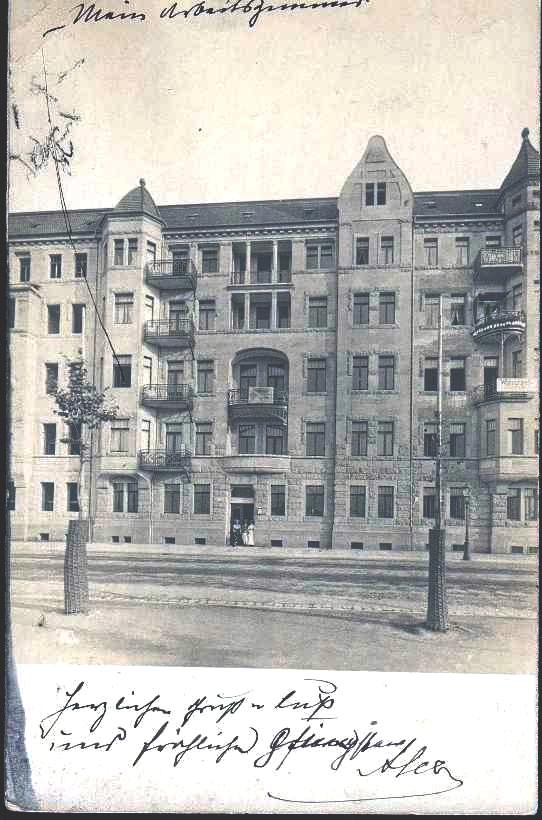
The house at 16 Johannstädter Ufer in Dresden, where Kircher and his family lived from 1904 to 1906

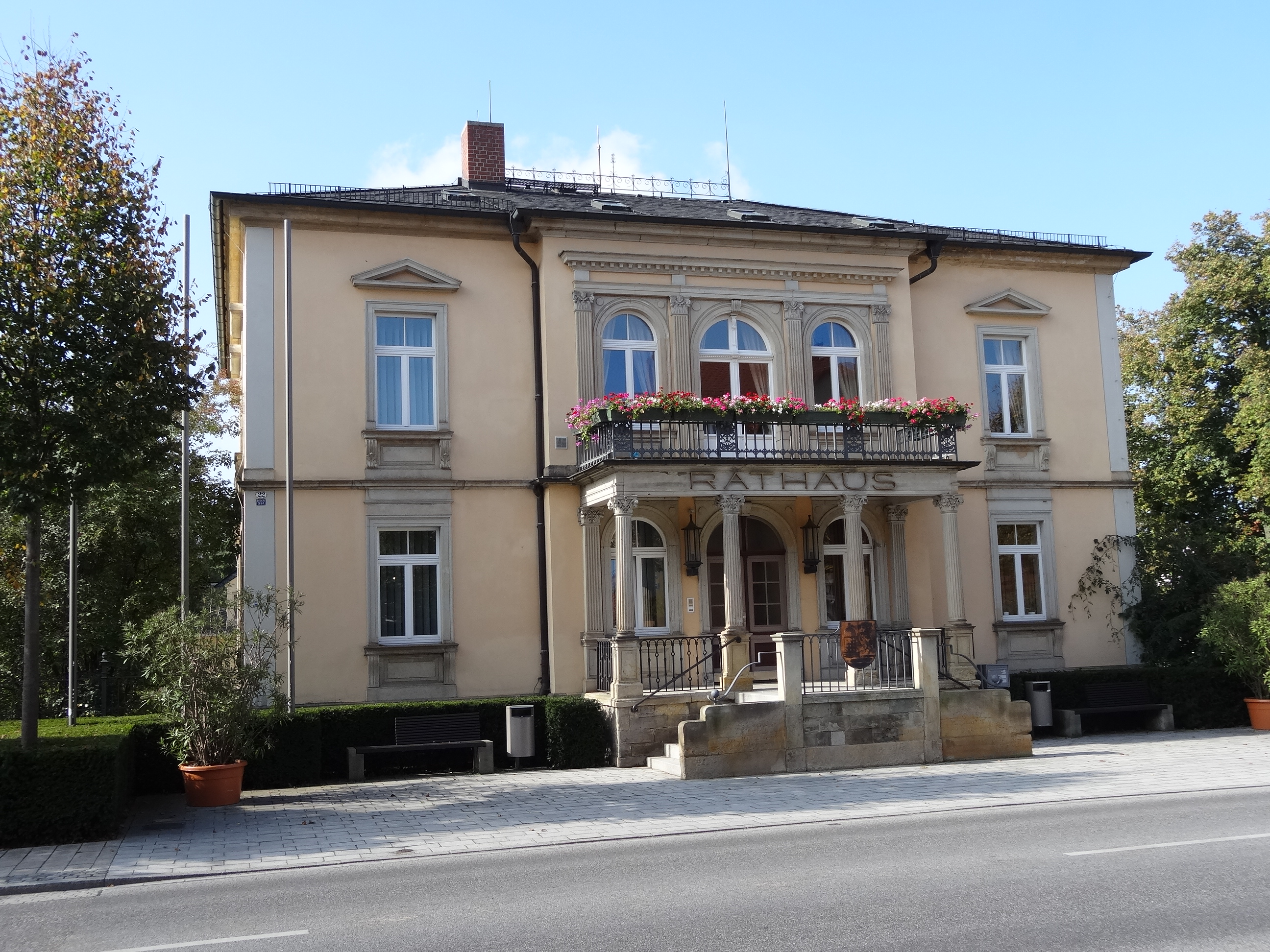
The house at 22 Schlossallee in Moritzburg, where Kircher and his family lived from 1907 to 1921

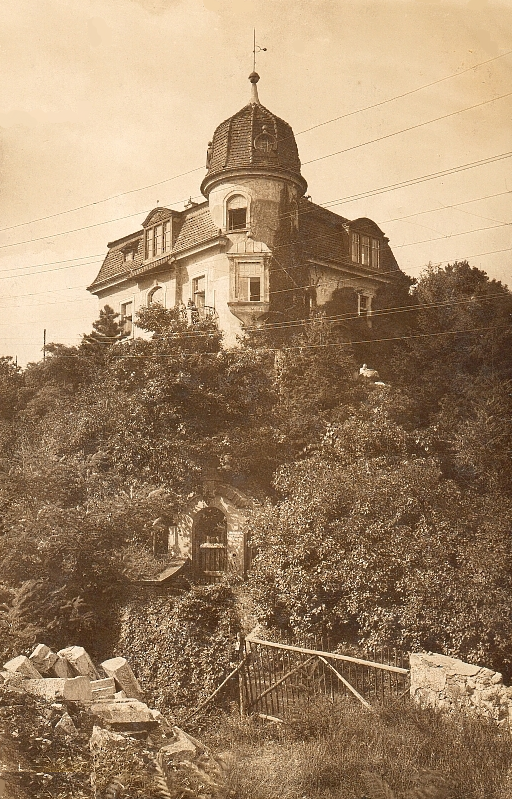
The villa at 6 Jagdweg, Niederlößnitz, where Kircher and his family lived from 1922 to 1933

Kircher was born in Trieste, which belonged at that time to the Austro-Hungarian Empire (Habsburg monarchy). As a young man he intended to choose the profession of a naval officer in the Austro-Hungarian Navy. Because of a foot injury his application was rejected. In 1888 he opted for studying painting at the Berlin Academy, where he concentrated mainly on marine painting from the start. His teachers were Hans Gude and Hermann Eschke.

Kircher made numerous study trips throughout Europa, Asia, North America and Egypt. During these travels, he made several important paintings, drawings and illustrations. In 1893 he worked on the picturesque decoration of buildings at the World Exhibition in Chicago as well as panoramas and dioramas of the marine painter de:Hans von Petersen. In addition, Kircher worked as an illustrator for popular German and foreign magazines and publishers of which only a few can be mentioned: The Leipziger Illustrierte Zeitung or the modern illustrated weekly Reclams universe (Leipzig), the writings of the Austrian (Vienna) and the German fleet association (Berlin) and the Viennese publisher Philipp & Kramer, for which he designed the postcard series "Dalmatia and Istria". These include Feldpost, postcards which Kircher created for the Austrian Red Cross, the War Welfare Office or the War Aid Office and also for the London Postcard Publisher Raphael Tuck & Sons and the Swedish Postcards Publisher: "Gothenburg Lithographic AB and Meyer & Köster" etc. For some time Kircher owned a steam yacht, which he named Romana – this was his wife's name. With this ship he could better motives collect and draw maritime objects from the area. This he did for example in fleet parades.

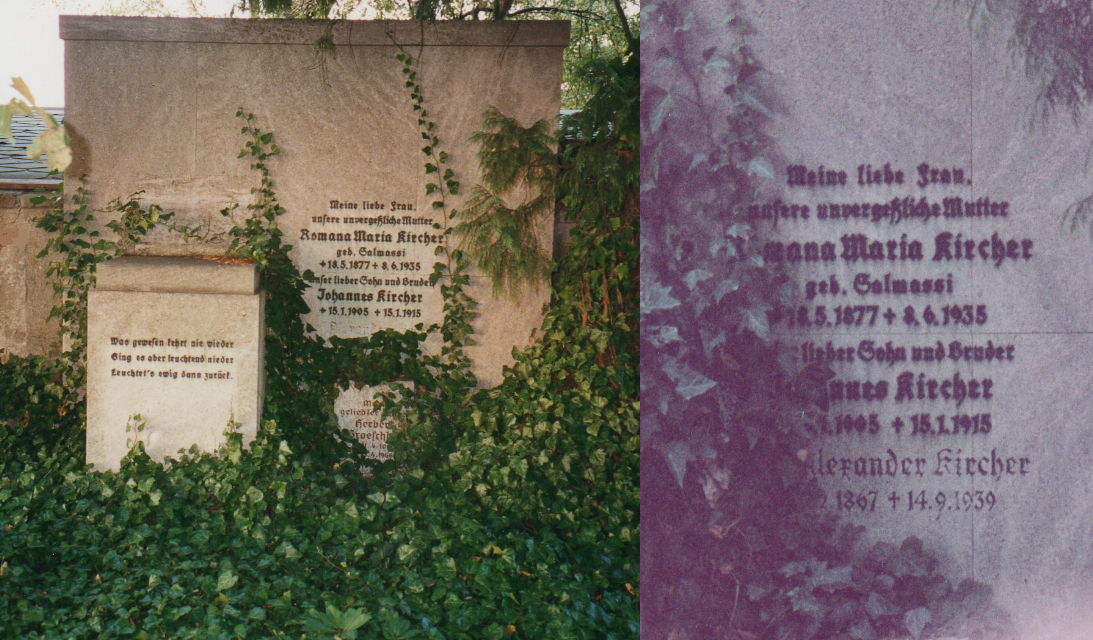
The Kircher family grave in the cemetery at Moritzburg in Saxony

Between 1895 and 1900 he was a professor at the Art Academy in Trieste and married Romana Salmassi in the Chiesa di Sant'Antonio Taumaturgo on 15 October 1898. This marriage produced three sons and three daughters. In 1904, after a short stay in Vienna, Kircher moved from Trieste to Dresden, where he lived until 1906 and where he joined the General German Art Cooperative as a freelance artist. In 1906 the family moved to Moritzburg. From 1922 the Kirchers occupied a villa at 6 Jagdweg in Niederlößnitz and from 1933 to about 1935 they lived in Kötzschenbroda-Niederlößnitz. In June 1935, Kircher's wife died. The painter then moved to Klotzsche, where he took up residence in a building belonging to the former Air War School in that town.

Influential members of the nobility and some industrialists – especially from the circles of Maritime Navigation – promoted the artist. First of them Emperor Franz Joseph I and Emperor Wilhelm II. On behalf of these two monarchs, Kircher painted numerous images of the Austro-Hungarian Navy and the Imperial German Navy. His paintings were also found on the large passenger ships of the time, as well as in the offices of well known shipping companies and shipyards and of course also in private ownership. During World War II, several images got lost or disappeared. An example of the many lost images is the large oil painting of the steamship Columbus ("The Columbus in the Kaiser lock"). This painting was given by the North German Lloyd as a gift to the city of Bremerhaven on the occasion of its 100th anniversary in 1927. The painting has disappeared at the end of World War II (1945). Others of his paintings have been preserved for posterity and can be seen in many museums today; see list of locations excerpt.

Kircher concluded his life's work with a series of one hundred paintings which documented the development of German shipping over a millennium and which hung in the Institute and Museum of Oceanography MfM. of the University of Berlin. The current location of the works is unknown, reproductions have since appeared as an image panel work (1934) and in book form (1939) and recently only in parts on CD-ROM (2010). Meanwhile, 22 images, of which the majority is from the collection of MfM, were rediscovered in the archives of Wehrgeschichtliches Training Centre of the Naval Academy Mürwik in Flensburg-Mürwik. Kircher died on 16 September 1939, in Berlin, the last place where he had worked. The painter was laid to rest in the family grave in Moritzburg, Saxony.

== Awards and decorations ==
Kircher received the Spanish Order of Isabella the Catholic in February 1909 in the Spanish Embassy in Berlin. This award will be given for services to art and science.

== Collection of paintings (excerpt) ==
- The Battle of Lissa. Oil on canvas, 1918, 318 x 705 cm. Museum of Military History, Vienna.
- Frigate SMS Novara. Oil on canvas, 118 x 100 cm. Military History Museum, Vienna.
- Passenger ship Isonzo in the Gulf of Trieste. Oil on canvas, 1917, 300 x 690 cm, Inv.-Nr.: BPA-012797. Technisches Museum, Vienna.
- Ships of Tegetthoff class, in the foreground SMS Viribus Unitis. Oil on canvas, 96 x 150 cm. Austrian Marine Association, Vienna.
- SMS Erzherzog Karl. Oil on canvas, 50 x 75 cm. Archduke Franz Ferdinand Museum, Artstetten, Lower Austria.
- Cruiser frigates Stosch, Gneisenau and Stein. Oil on canvas, 1938. Naval Academy, Flensburg-Mürwik.
- SMS Emden in battle. Oil on canvas, 1910, 101 x 150 cm. City Museum Warleberger-Hof, Kiel.
- Steamer Delos Deutsche Levante line. Gouache, 79 x 65 cm. German Maritime Museum, Bremerhaven.
- North German winter landscape – Frisian house on a narrow river. Oil on cardboard, about 1925, 20 x 30 cm. privately owned.
- Port of Hamburg with the mail steamer Cap Arcona. Oil on canvas, 1932 98 x 148 cm. Museum of Communication, former Federal Postal Museum, Frankfurt am Main.
- Cable steamer Stephan before Yap (Caroline). Oil on canvas, 1905, 99 x 148 cm. Museum of Communication, former Federal Postal Museum, Frankfurt am Main.
- Swedish passenger ship Kungsholm in the port of Gothenburg. Oil on canvas, 1928, 106 x 137.8 cm. The Post Museum, Stockholm, Sweden.
- LZ 127 Graf Zeppelin with a Russian icebreaker "Malygin". Oil on canvas, 1931, 81 x 121.8 cm. Zeppelin Museum Friedrichshafen.
- SMS Kaiser Karl VI. Oil on canvas, 1895, 88 x 150 cm. Museum of the city of Rovinj, Rovinj (Croatia).
- Steam yacht Sazume (Japanese 雀, the sparrow in English). Oil on canvas, 47 x 66 cm. Museum of the city of Rovinj, (Croatia).
- Battleship USS Kentucky. Oil on cardboard, 1898, 32 x 47.5 cm. Maritime Museum, Split (Croatia), Split
- Steamer Pelikan. Oil on cardboard, 1891, 32 x 48 cm. Maritime Museum, Split (Croatia).
- SMS Fasan. Oil on canvas, 1897, 70 x 165 cm. Historical Museum of Istria, Pula (Croatia).
- SMS Budapest off the port of Fiume. Graphics, 1905, 35 × 57 cm. Maritime and History Museum of Littoral Croatia, Rijeka (Croatia).
- Brigantine at sea. Oil on canvas, 1892, 75 x 150 cm. Sergej Mašera-Maritime Museum, Piran (Slovenia).
- Austrian Barque off Gibraltar. Oil on canvas, 1893, 70,5 × 145,5 cm. Sergej Mašera-Maritimes Museum, Piran

=== Larger Image collections ===
- In addition to the selection of the above pictures large stocks of Kircher paintings exist in the Military History Museum (HGM) in Vienna and the Archduke Franz Ferdinand Museum in Artstetten in Lower Austria. Moreover, in Germany in the Naval Academy, Flensburg-Mürwik and there some Kircher paintings are shown in the commander Villa. In Croatia in the museum of the city of Rovinj and Split in the Maritime Museum. Of course, there are also numerous paintings in private ownership.

=== Stolen artwork ===
- The original painting: "LZ 127 Graf Zeppelin with Russian icebreaker Malygin" from 1931, dimensions: 26.00 x 39.00 inch, formerly part of the Reichspostmuseum in Berlin – 1945 after the end of the Second World War this image was lost. – The painting was auctioned at Cowan's Auctions in Cincinnati, Ohio, US, for US$19,550 in 2005. Since then, the painting has been at Pullman Gallery in London, a return to the Museum of Communication in Frankfurt am Main (Legal successor to the Reichspostmuseum) has not yet taken place.

== Others ==
In the Austro-Hungarian Navy Museum "Gallerion", in Novigrad, Istria (Croatia), multiple replicas and photographs of well known Kircher paintings will be shown.

== Literature ==
- Elmar Samsinger, Christian Ortner (historian) (ed.): Unsere Kriegsflotte 1556-1908, erw. Reprint v. Koudelka, A.Kircher. 1914. Verlag Kral, Bendorf, 1. Aufl. 2019, S. 360, ISBN 978-3-99024-856-0, German language.
- Liliana Pajola (ed.): "La Marina da Guerra Austro-Ungarica nei quadri di Alexander Kircher, pittore triestino dimenticato". Publishers: "luglio editore", Triest, 2018, in Italian, ISBN 978-88-6803-251-7.
- De Gruyter (ed.: Andreas Beyer, Bénédict Savoy, Wolf Tegethoff): The artists of the World. Publisher: Walter de Gruyter GmbH, Berlin / Boston 2014, Vol.:80, p. 307, ISBN 978-3-11-023185-4 --->>> Catalogue of the German National Library.
- Hans-F. Schweers: Gemälde in deutschen Museen. Katalog der ausgestellten und depotgelagerten Werke, 4.akt.u.erw.Ausgb., Seite 607, K. G. Saur Verlag, München 2005, ISBN 3-598-24168-2, German language.
- Stjepan Lozo: Vessel Portraits by Alexander Kircher, Exhibition catalog year 2000, The Croatian Maritime Museum, Split
- Emmanuel Bénézit: Dictionnaire critique et documentaire des peintres, sculpteurs dessinateurs et graveurs. Édition Gründ, Paris 1999, Band 7, S. 814, ISBN 2-7000-3017-6 --->>> Bibliothèque nationale de France.
- Renate Basch-Ritter (ed.): Österreich auf allen Meeren. Styria Verlag, Graz, Wien, Köln, 1995, German language.
- Hans Jurgen Hansen: The Ships of the German Fleets, 1848–1945. Naval Institute Press, Annapolis June 1988, ISBN 978-0870216541
- J.Bracker, U.Bauche, C.Prange: Alster, Elbe and the Sea. Hamburg's Shipping and Port in selected Paintings, Drawings and Watercolours of the Museum of Hamburg History, Topographikon Verlag, Hamburg 1981, 248 S. ISBN 3-920953-18-5.
- A. E. Sokol (ed.): Seemacht Österreich – Die kuk Kriegsmarine 1382–1918. Verlag F. Molden, Wien, München, Zürich, 1972, German language.
- Thieme-Becker (ed.): General lexicon of visual artists from Antiquity to the Present. Volume 20, Leipzig, 1927 351st
- Johannes Kaltenboeck: Mit vereinten Kräften. Union, deutsche Verlagsgesellschaft, Stuttgart, 1916, 3rd edition, German language.

== Exhibitions ==
- Show Event: Ship ahead – Marine Painting from the 14th to the 19th century. Residenzgalerie Salzburg, Austria, from 16 July to 1 November 2005
- Stjepan Lozo: Vessel Portraits by Alexander Kircher, year 2000, The Croatian Maritime Museum, Split

== Gallery ==
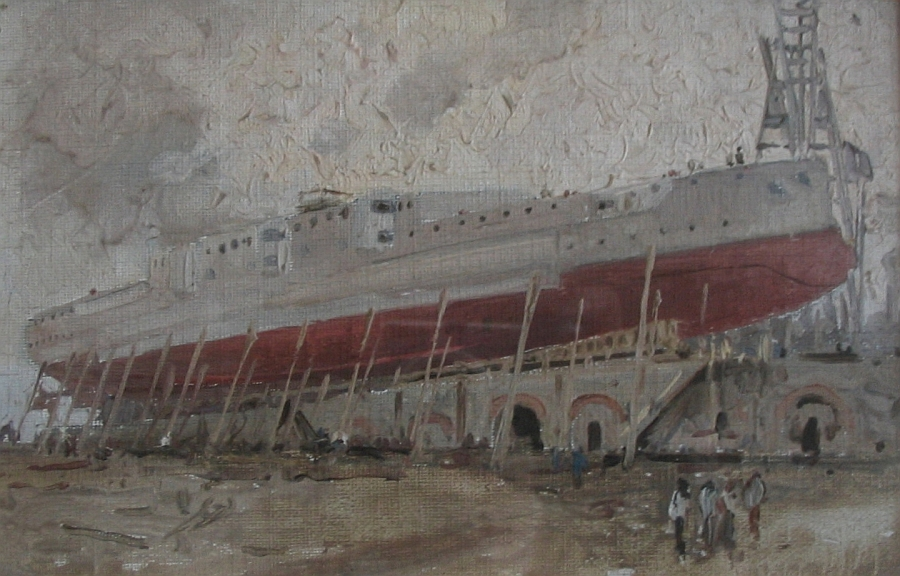
A Habsburg-class battleship on the slipway at the Stabilimento Tecnico Triestino shipyard in 1900–02

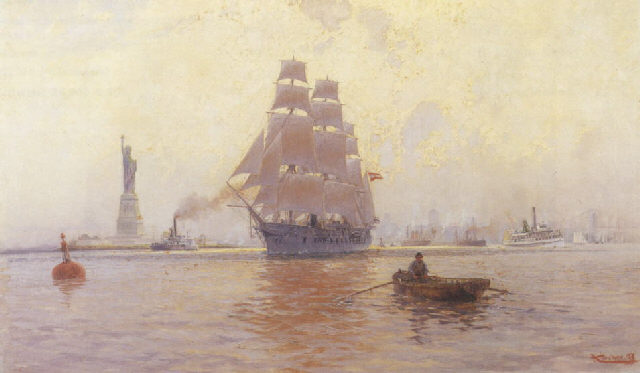
A fully rigged ship in front of the Statue of Liberty in New York Bay, 1897

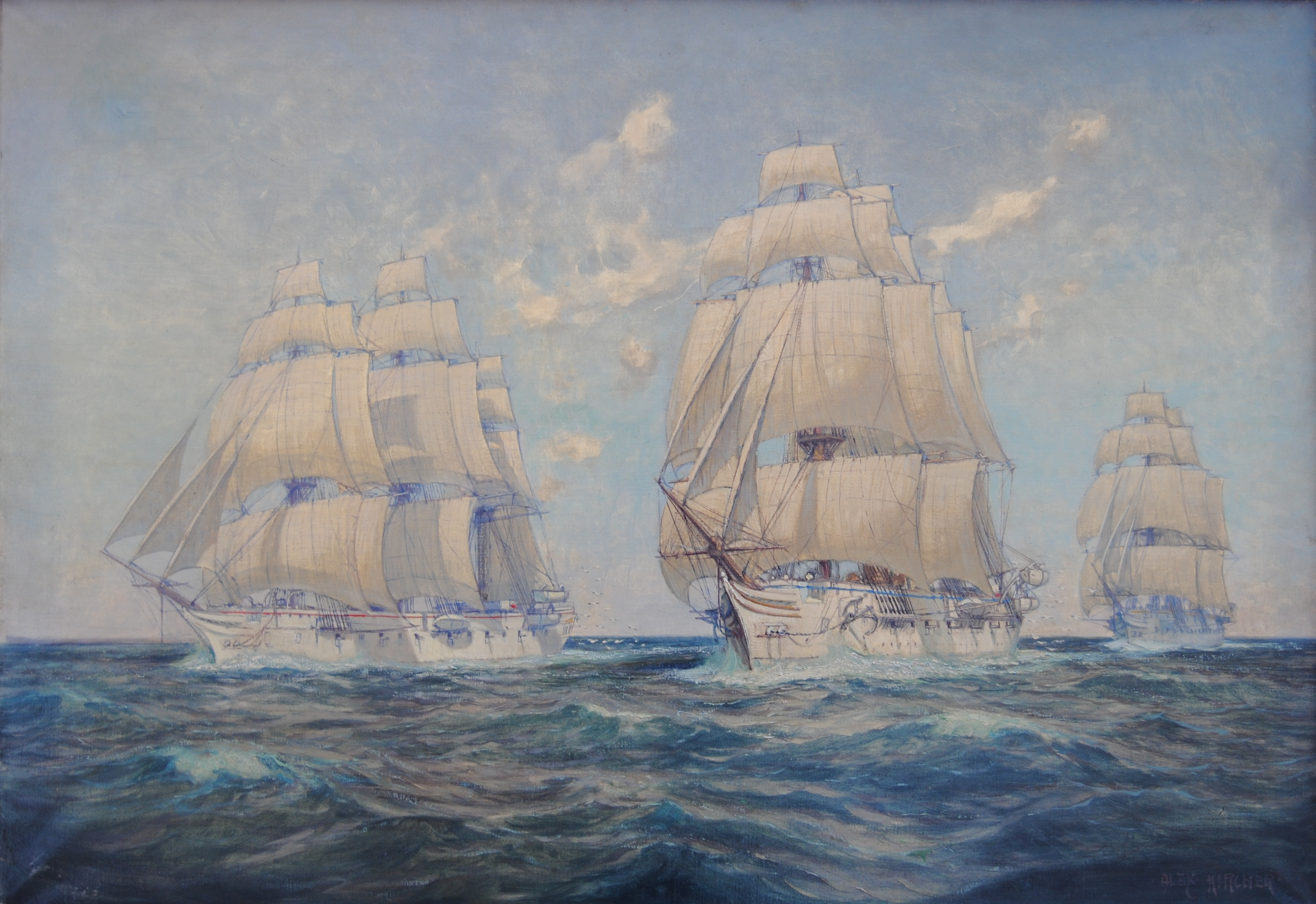
The Imperial German Navy sail training ships, Stosch, Stein, and Gneisenau in 1896

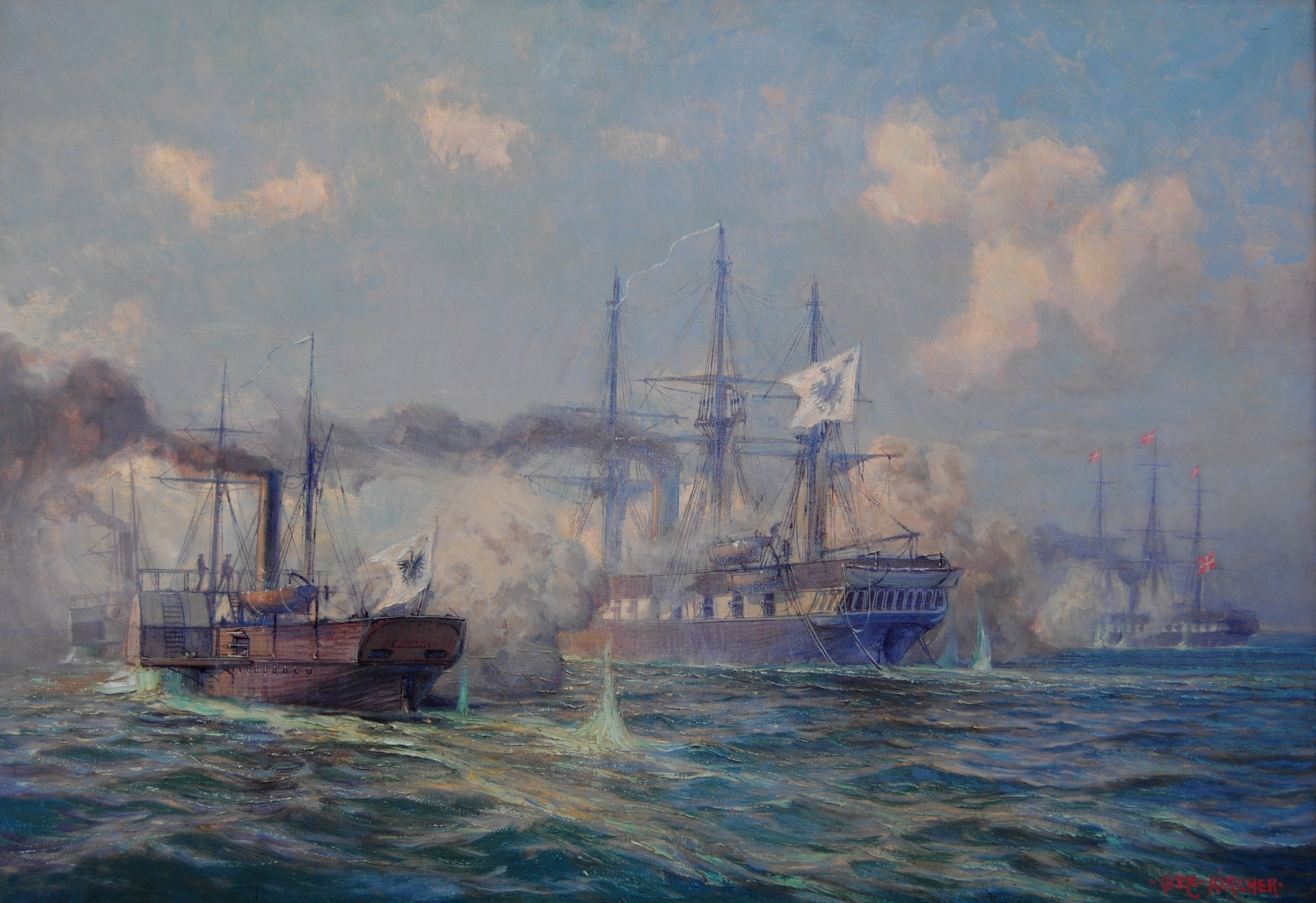
The Battle of Jasmund 1864 between Prussian and Danish vessels

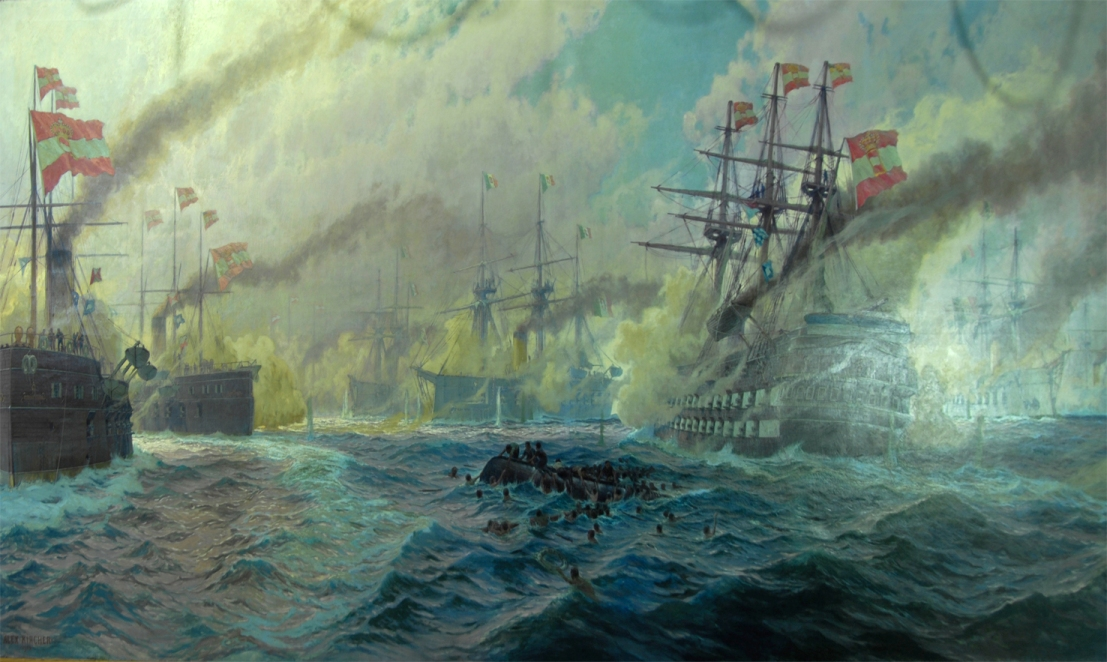
The Battle of Lissa (1866) Museum of Military History, Vienna, Austria

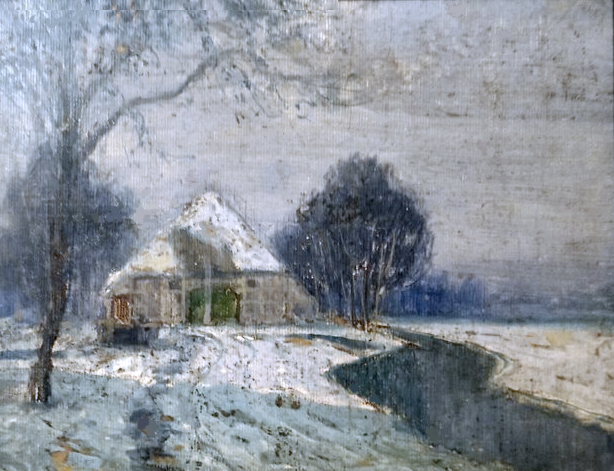
North German winter landscape: Frisian house on a narrow river, about 1925

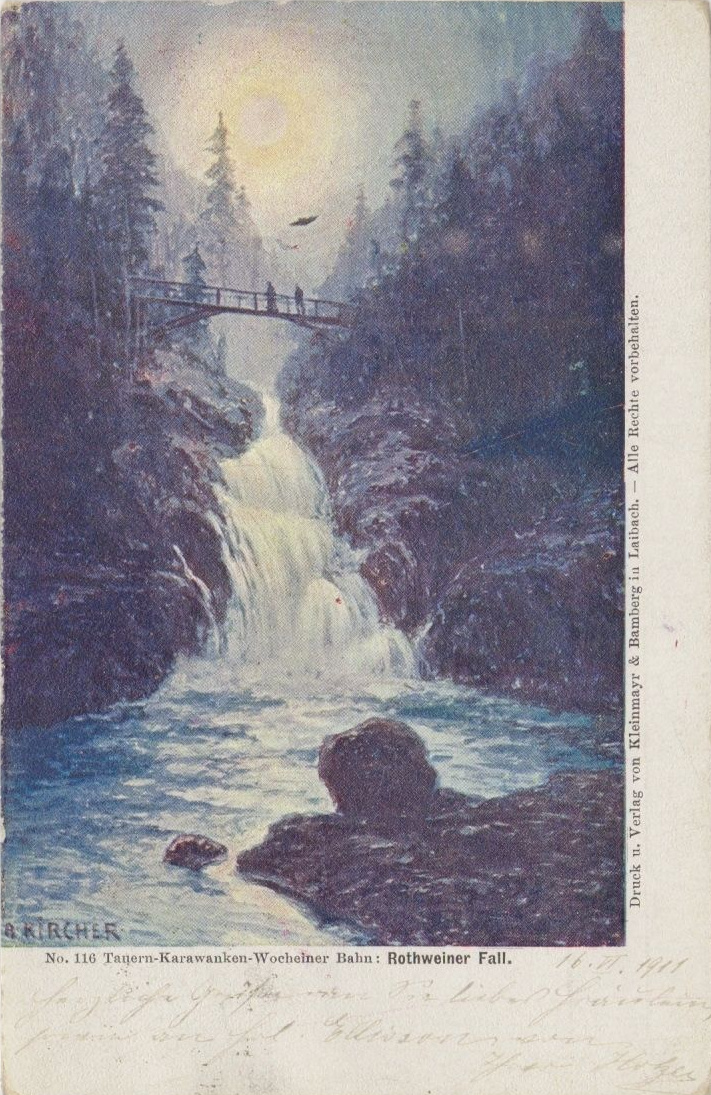
Vintgar Gorge, on a postcard from 1911

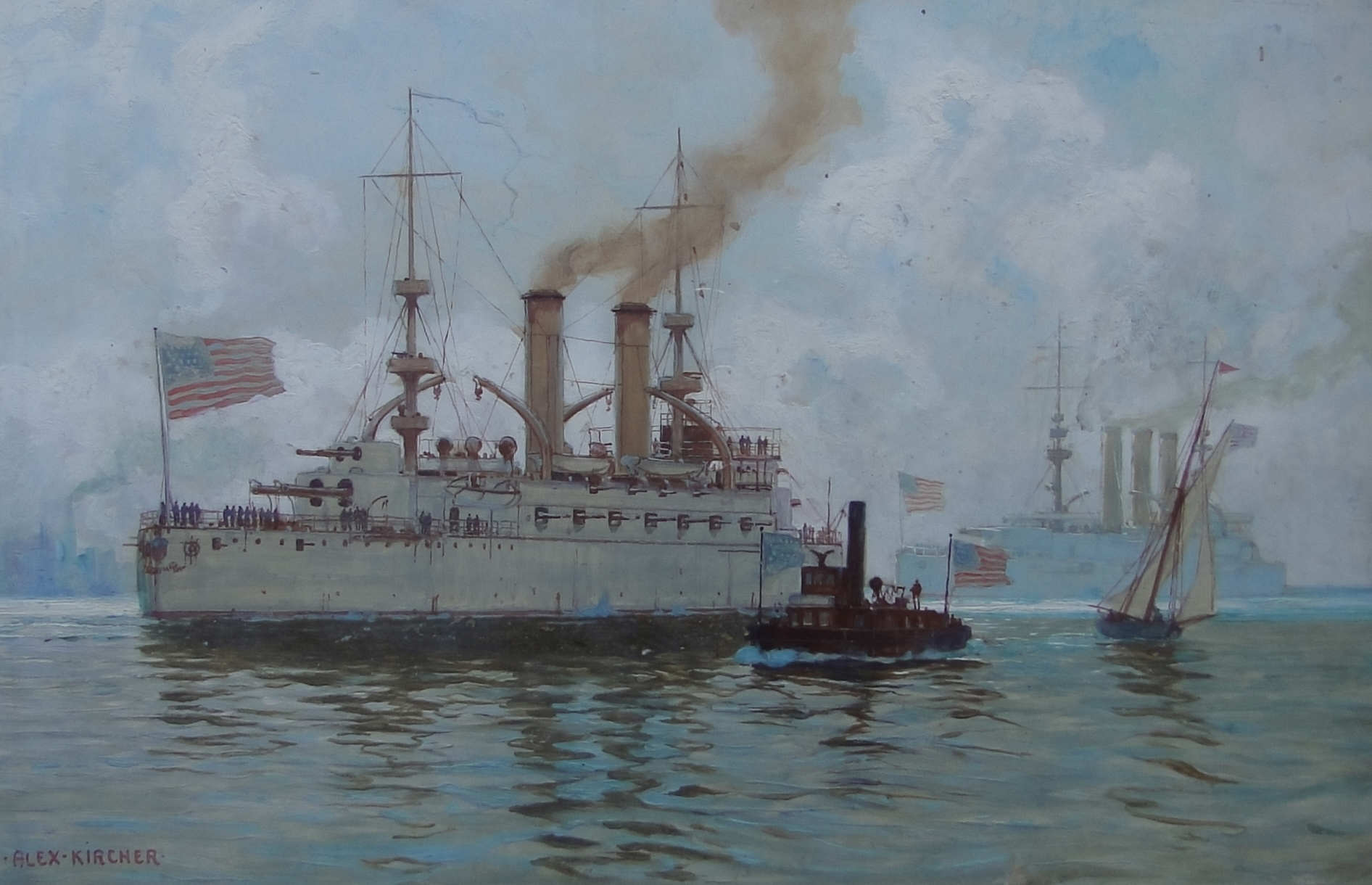
The USS Kentucky (BB-6), built in Newport News, Virginia, and launched in 1898

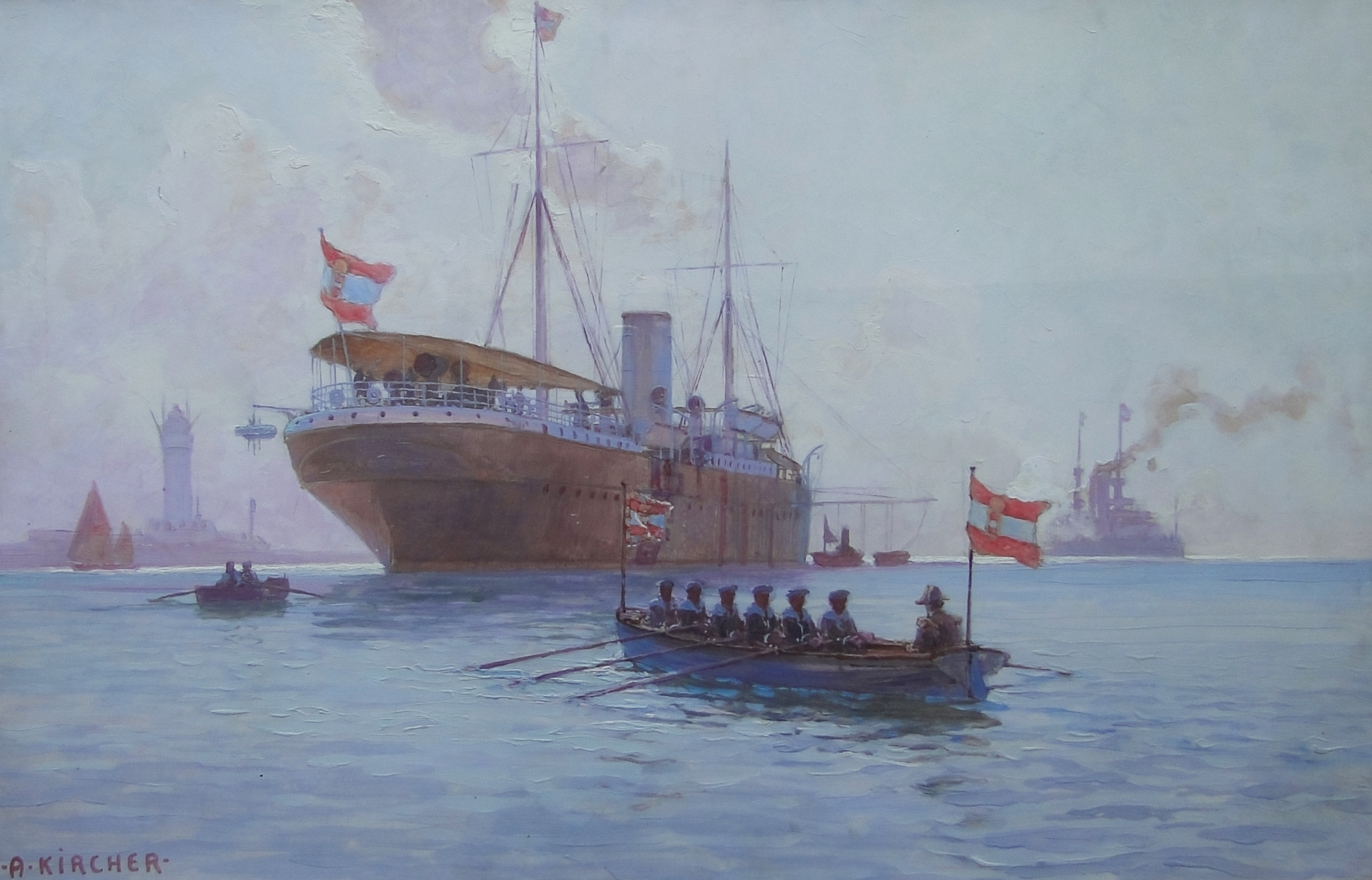
The Austrian mail steamer Pelikan moored at anchor, 1891

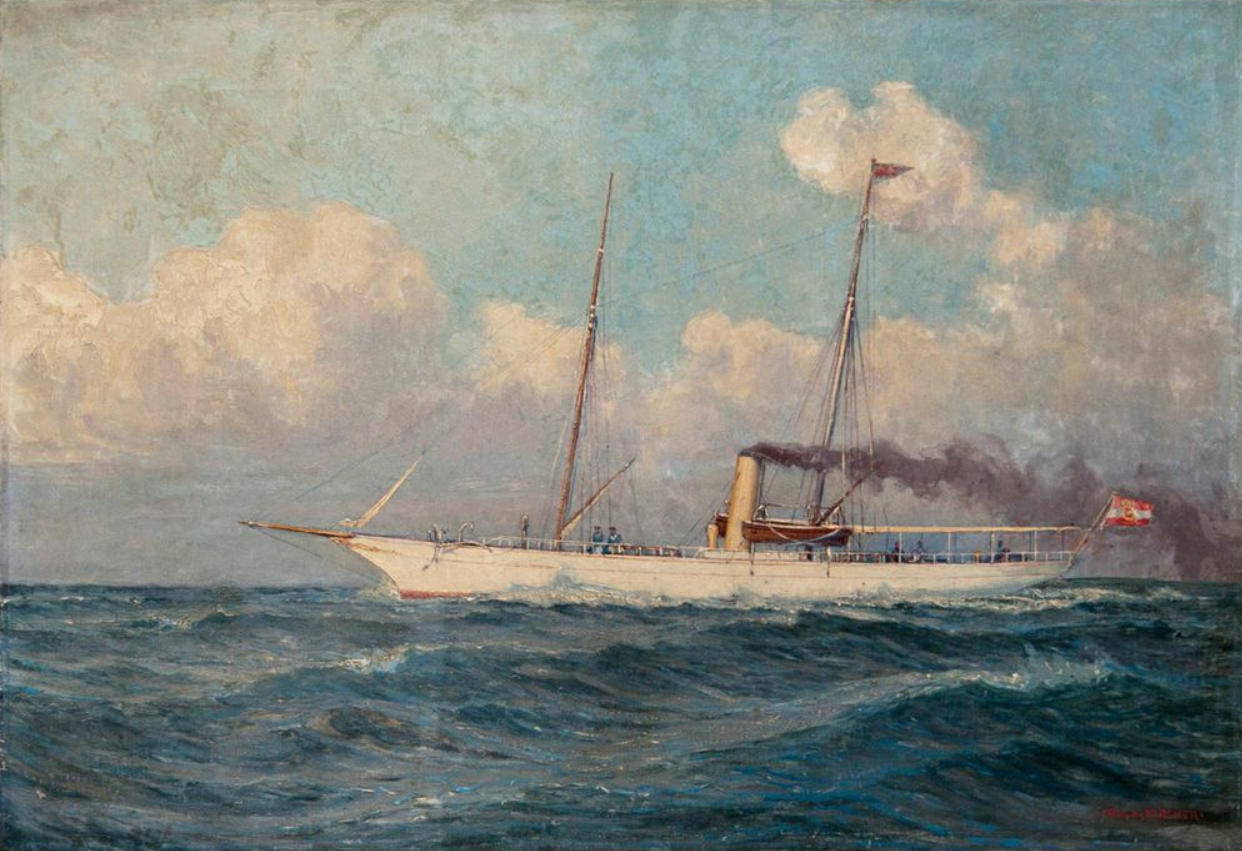
The Austrian steam sailing yacht Suzume

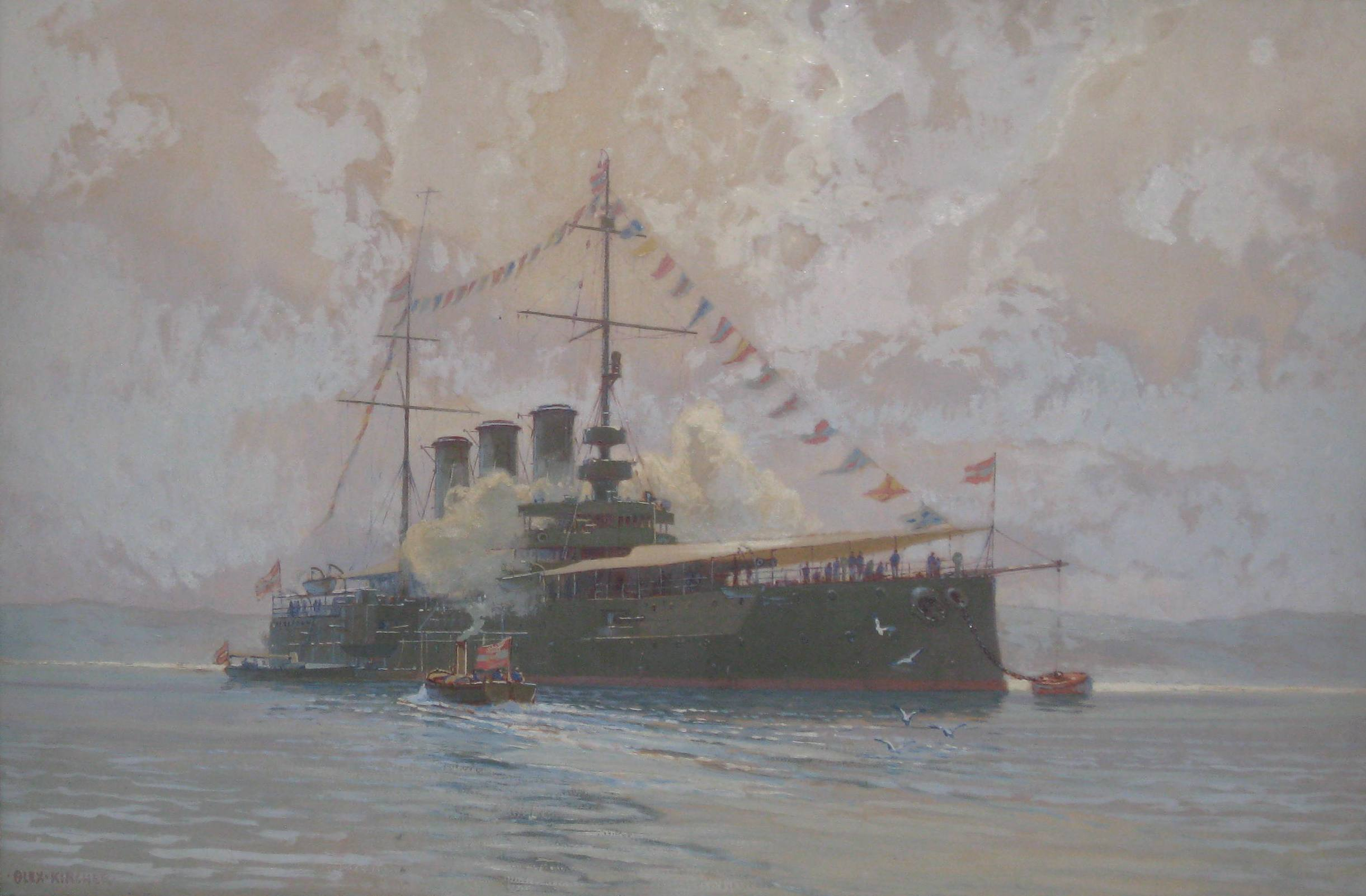
SMS Erzherzog Karl in Lower Austria

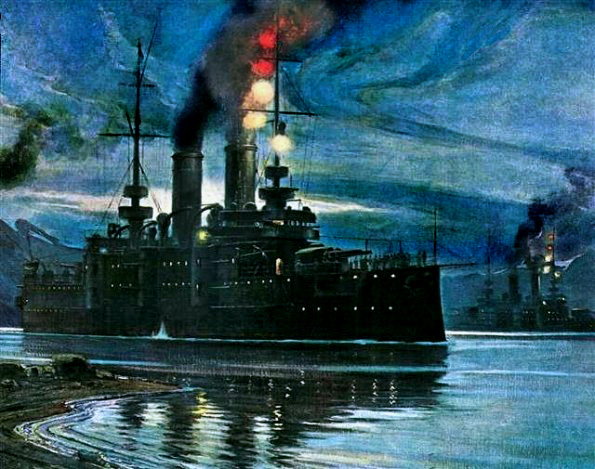
The battleship SMS Habsburg at night, 1904

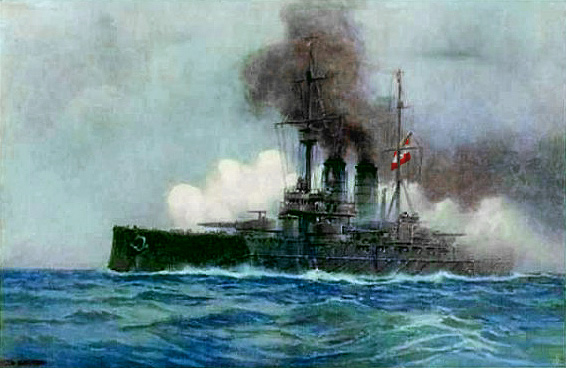
SMS Erzherzog Franz Ferdinand

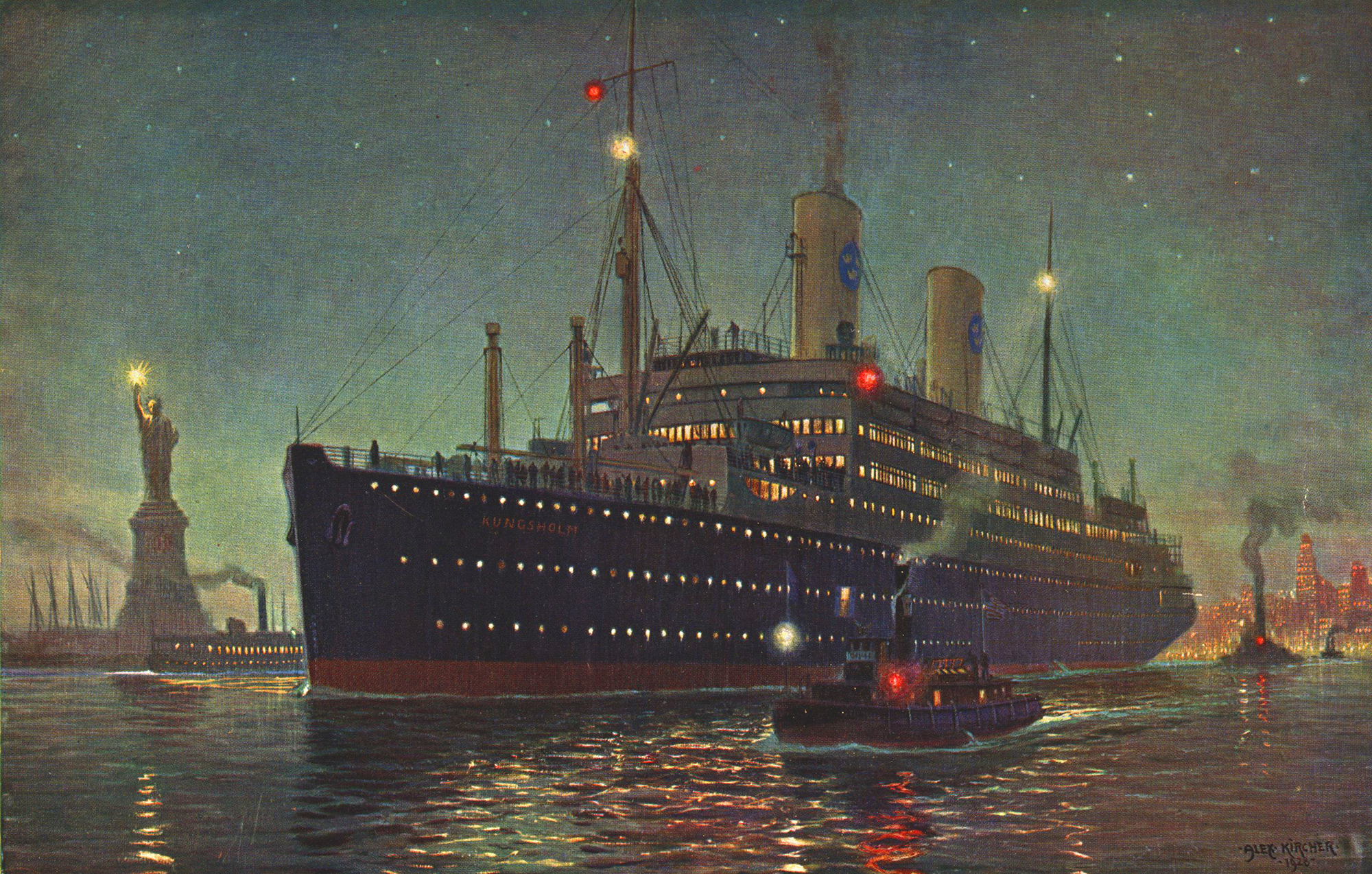
The Swedish American Line's passenger ship Kungsholm on departure from the Port of New York in 1928

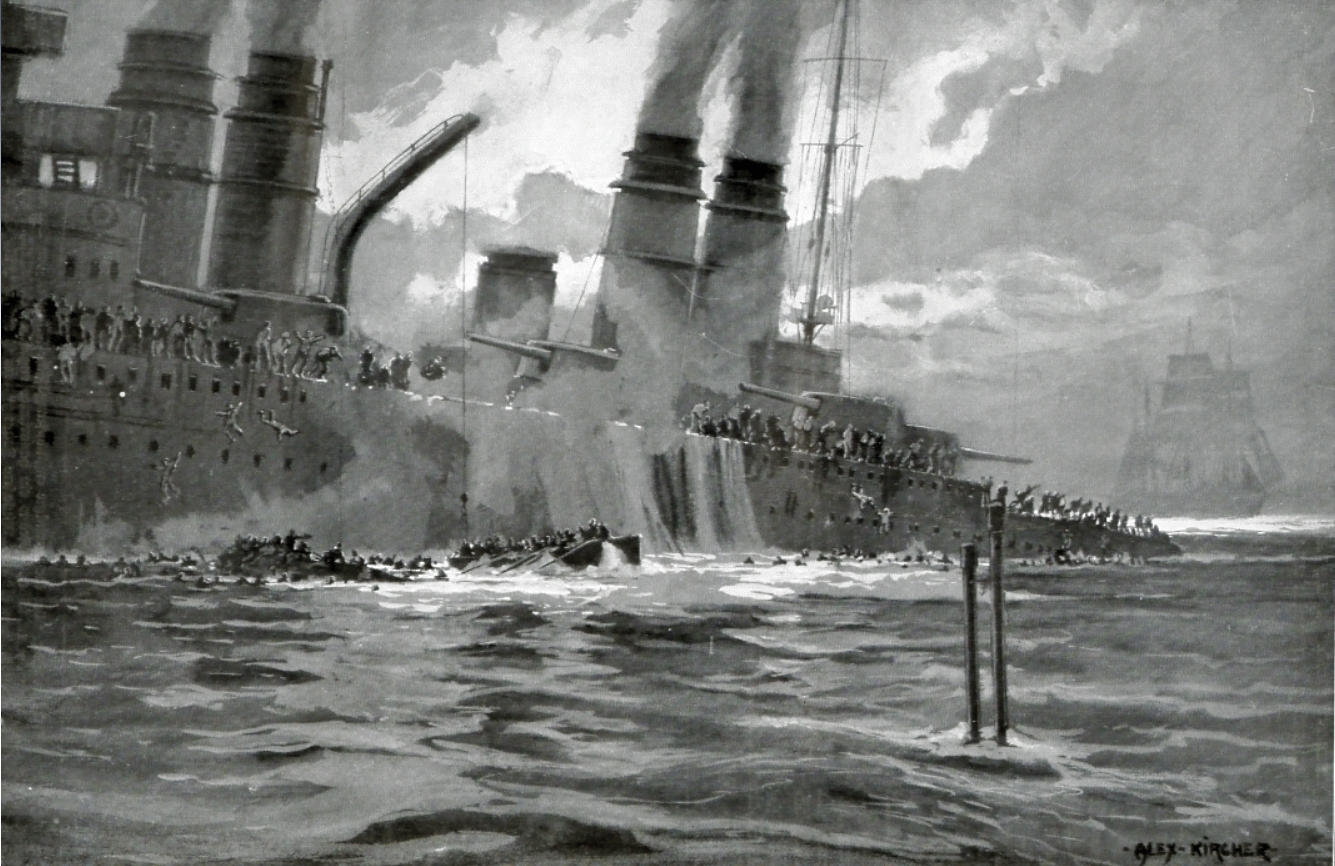
The sinking of the French battleship-cruiser Léon Gambetta on 27 April 1915, after a painting by Kircher

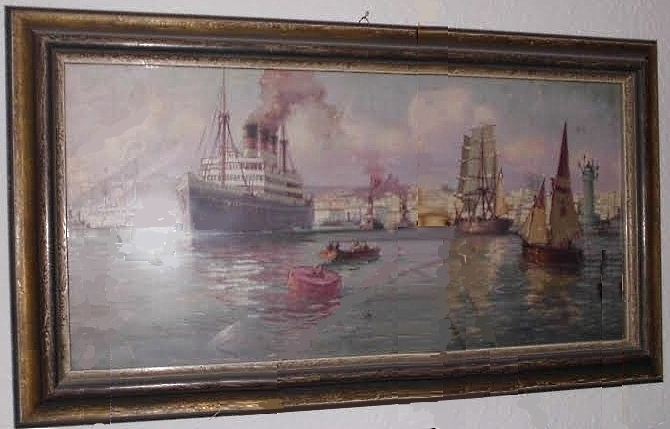
Original outline for the larger painting Passenger ship Isonzo in the Gulf of Trieste, 1918"
