= Andries Botha =

Andries Botha may refer to:

- Andries Botha (soldier), 19th-century politician and soldier in the Cape Colony
- Andries Botha (Free State politician) (born 1939), 21st-century politician from the Free State
- Andries Botha (artist) (born 1952), South African artist
