= Yellow Cathedral =

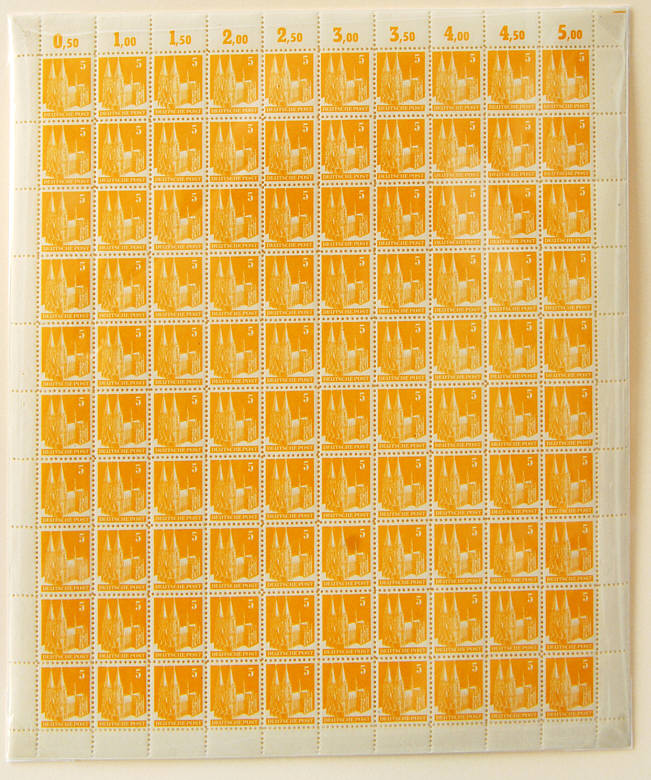
- The only known full sheet of 100 Yellow Cathedral stamps
- Country of production: Germany
- Date of production: 1948
- Nature of rarity: unissued, nearly all printed copies were destroyed
- No. in existence: 103 (1 sheet of 100 and 3 single stamps)
- Face value: 5 Pfennig

The Yellow Cathedral (German Gelber Dom) is a stamp produced by Deutsche Post but which was never issued. Beginning on 1 September 1948 a new stamp series, the "building series", was introduced in the American and British Occupation Zones of Germany. One planned design featured Cologne Cathedral in yellow, with a nominal value of five Pfennig. The stamp was intended to be used as a surcharge stamp for airmail delivery.

The stamp was actually issued in blue (Michel catalogue number 75) and all but a few copies of the yellow stamps were destroyed. There have been only three known auctions of yellow cathedral stamps.

Between 20 and 22 September 2007 the only complete sheet of stamps was exhibited at the Philately and Coin fair ("Philatelie und MünzExpo") in Cologne. The copy on display was from Bonn's Philatelic Archive. The sheet is insured for one million euro.
