= Het Kasteel van Batavia =

Painting by Andries Beeckman

Het kasteel van Batavia
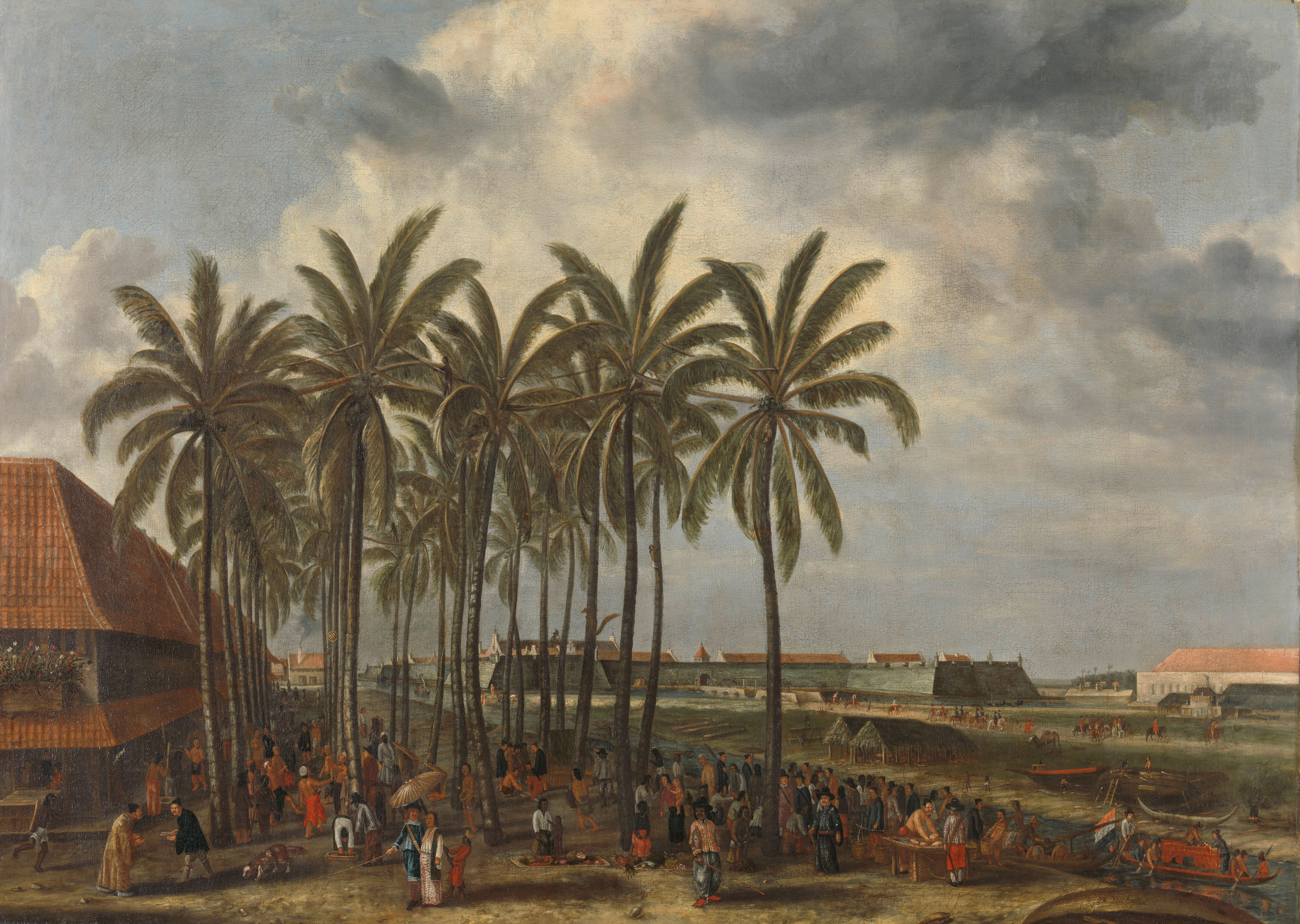
- Artist: Andries Beeckman
- Year: c. 1662-1663
- Catalogue: SK-A-19
- Medium: Oil on canvas
- Dimensions: 108 cm × 151.5 cm (43 in × 59.6 in)
- Location: Rijksmuseum Amsterdam; Amsterdam

Het kasteel van Batavia is a 17th-century painting by the Dutch painter Andries Beeckman. The painting depicts the Batavia Castle, the headquarter of the Dutch East India Company located in what is now Kota Tua in Jakarta, Indonesia. The painting is currently displayed in the Rijksmuseum in Amsterdam.

== Presentation ==
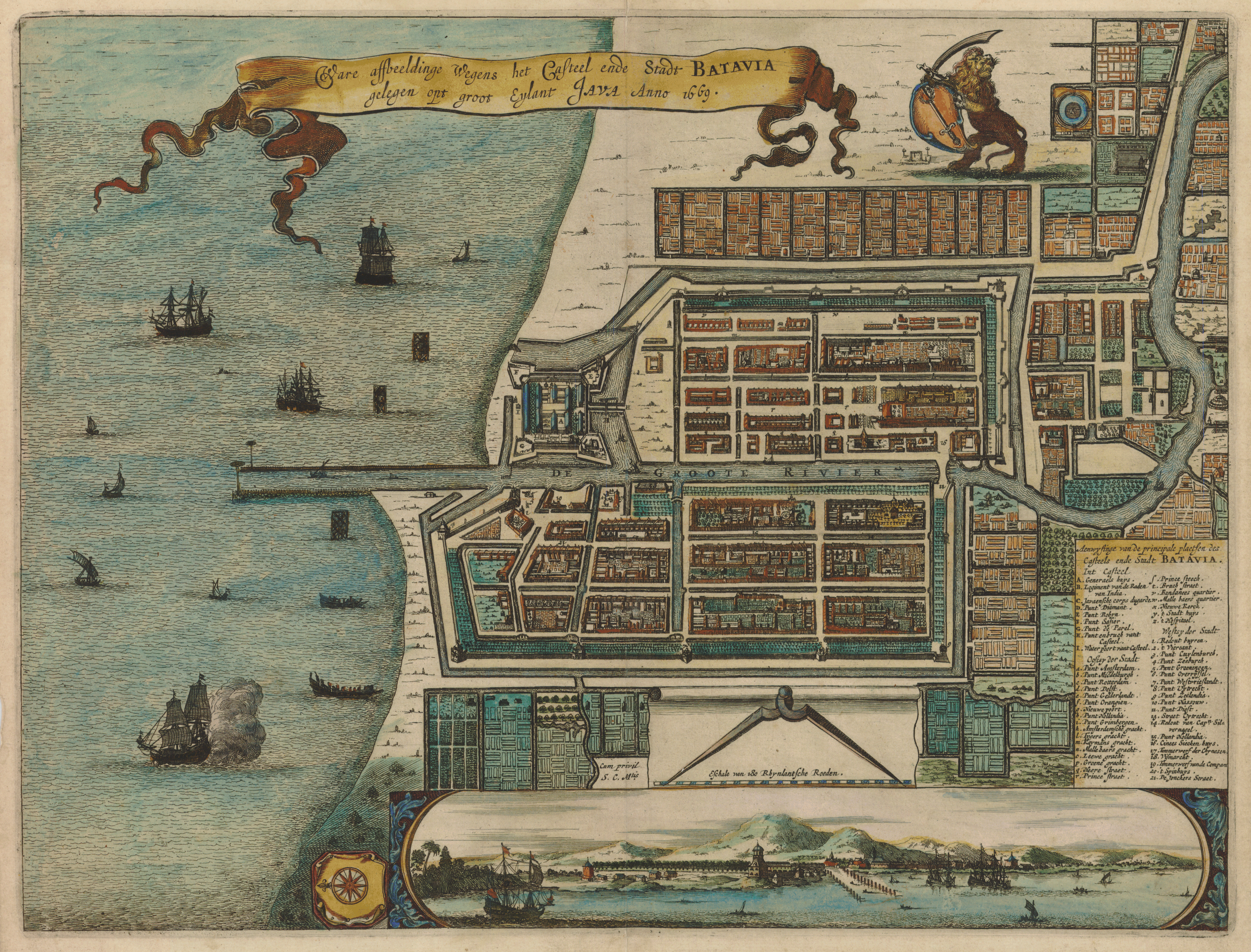
Map of Batavia in 1669 showing the location of the fish market (number 18) which is much closer than the one painted by Beeckman.

The painting features the Castle of Batavia, an early 17th-century fortress of the Dutch East India Company located in the city of Batavia (present Jakarta). The painter shows the fort as seen from the street of Kali Besar Barat (Grote Rivier West) with the Kali Besar on the right and the covered fish market on the far left. The painter created a vibrant setting by having a kind of street market placed below four rows of coconut palm trees.

On the market, people of different ethnicity are shown. These people represent the multi-ethnic inhabitants of Batavia. Among the different ethnic groups represented in the painting are The Chinese, the Malays, the Moluccans, the Dutch and the mestizos. There are also depictions of foreigners such as a Japanese and a Timorese. Men in striped clothing are the Mardijkers, released freed slaves from the conquered Portuguese territory. A Dutchman walks with his Asian wife in the middle, under a parasol. Several Maluku people are seen playing the takraw rattan ball game. At the very top of the palm trees, there are a few boys are picking coconuts, and throw them down to be collected by a group of Javanese at the bottom. A kind of bridge-like structure is formed between the coconut trees, to access each trees easily from the top. Batavia Castle looms in the background, while a group of Dutchmen on horses are seen just leaving the castle.

Beeckman has allowed himself some freedom in depicting the buildings of the city of Batavia. For example, the fish market is actually located much closer to the Castle than the one depicted by Beeckman in the painting. Nevertheless, his presentation of the market to the left of Kali Besar is reasonable, as there are buildings accurately located on the west side of the river.

== History ==
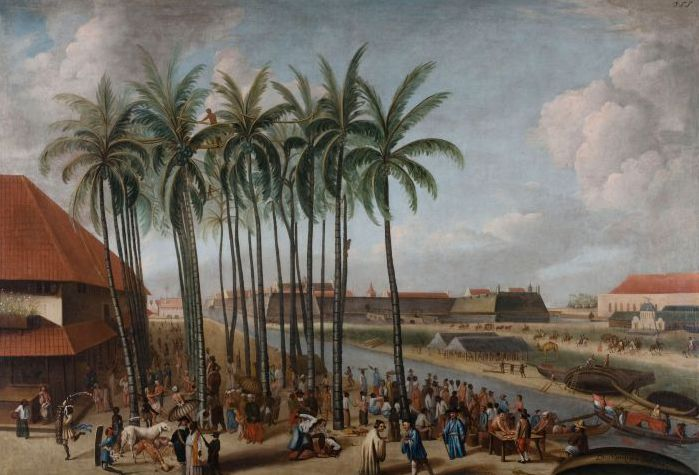
Anonymous. De markt van Batavia. Na 1688. Amsterdam, Tropenmuseum

In 1657, Beeckman was stationed in Batavia as a VOC soldier. In 1658, Beeckman returned to Amsterdam and using his sketches which he created in Batavia as a reference, he created Het Kasteel van Batavia in the Netherlands. Beeckman created the work following a commission by the Amsterdam Chamber of the VOC who wanted a painting to decorate the meeting room of the East Indies House in Amsterdam. He probably created the painting between 1662-1663.

In 1688, John George III, Elector of Saxony received permission from the Amsterdam Chamber to copy the paintings from the meeting room of the East Indies House, including Beeckman's Het Kasteel van Batavia. The painting De markt van Batavia which is currently kept in the Tropenmuseum is the result of the copy. This painting is signed J.F.F. and has an inscription on a boat 'De marckt van Batavia'. Although the painting of De markt van Batavia is traditionally attributed to Beeckman, it does not correspond stylistically to his work and there is no reason to doubt the authenticity of this signature. The painting De markt van Batavia is therefore not an exact copy of Beeckman's Het Kasteel van Batavia, but a work that is based on both Beeckman's original in the Rijksmuseum and Beeckman's costumes series, a series of painting depicting the costume of the inhabitants of Batavia.

== Attribution and dating ==
Het kasteel van Batavia is signed at the bottom right 'ABeeckman Fecit' and was probably painted in 1662-1663. In April 1662 Beeckman was commissioned by the Chamber of Amsterdam of the VOC to create two paintings, which he delivered in 1663. Beeckman received 240 guilders for this. Het Kasteel van Batavia is probably one of these works. The painting hung above the chimney of the meeting room in the East Indies House in Amsterdam until 1859. In 1859, the Rijksmuseum purchased the drawing from the Eats Indies House and was transferred to the museum.

== Cited works ==
Jonker, Menno; de Groot, Erlend; de Hart, Caroline (2014). Van velerlei pluimage. Zeventiende-eeuwse waterverftekeningen van Andries Beeckman. Nijmegen: Uitgeverij Van Tilt. ISBN 9789460041341.
