= Sandesh Museum of Communication =

Museum in Bangalore, India

Coordinates: 12°58′22″N 77°36′14″E

Sandesh Museum of Communication is a museum in Bangalore and is dedicated to the postal history of India and different modes of communication. The museum opened its doors in 2019 and is located inside a 140-year-old post office, preserved and refurbished as a museum.

== History ==
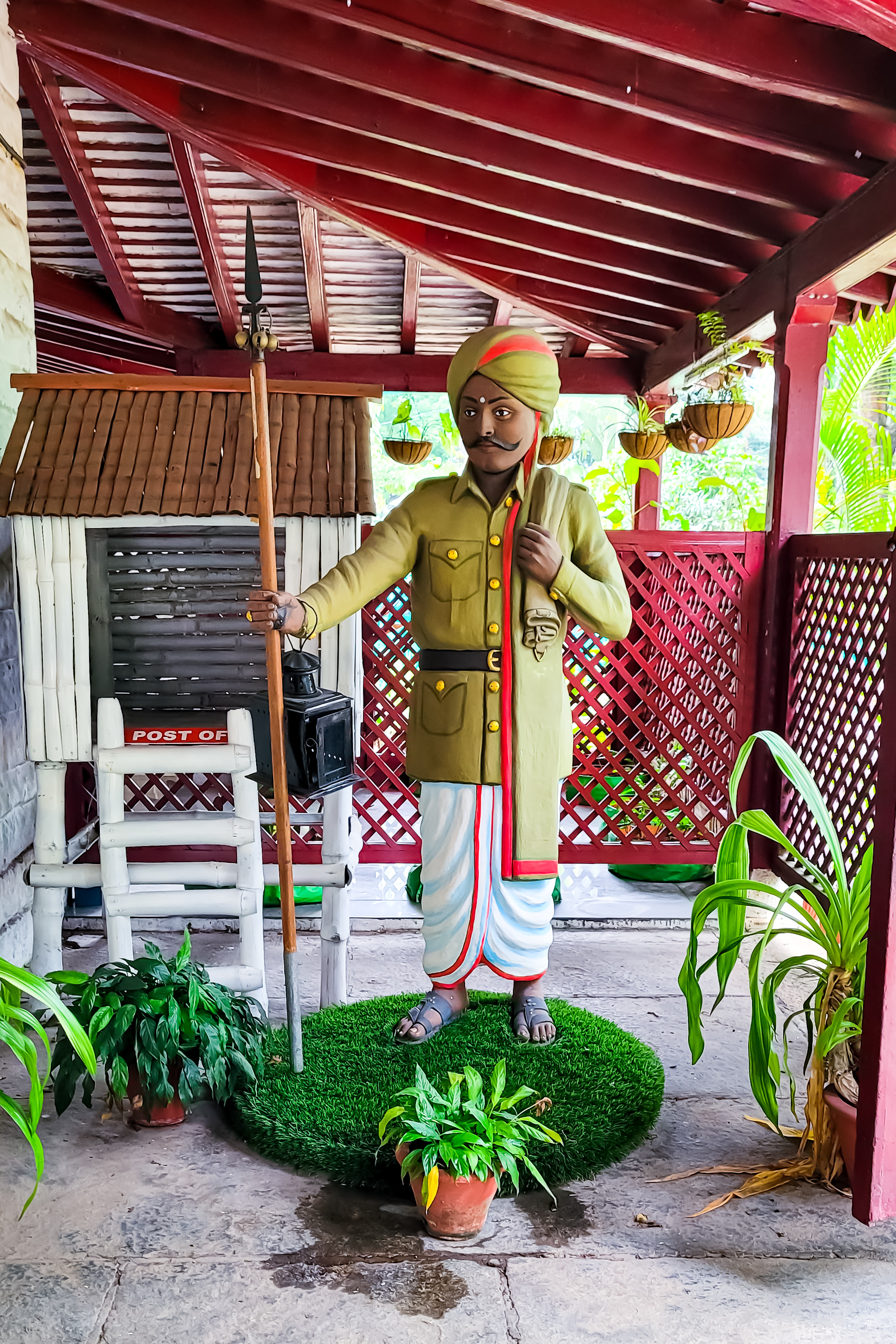
Display at Philatelic Museum, Bangalore

The structure previously housed a Government Museum in 1865, established by a Scottish surgeon Edward Balfour. The museum gives its name to 'Museum Road' the thoroughfare on which it is located. After its opening it was very popular. In coming years the museum was shifted to Kasturba Road. Over the years the building was used as the residence for a supervisor of a jail and a bank, before being part of the General Post Office.

== Collection ==
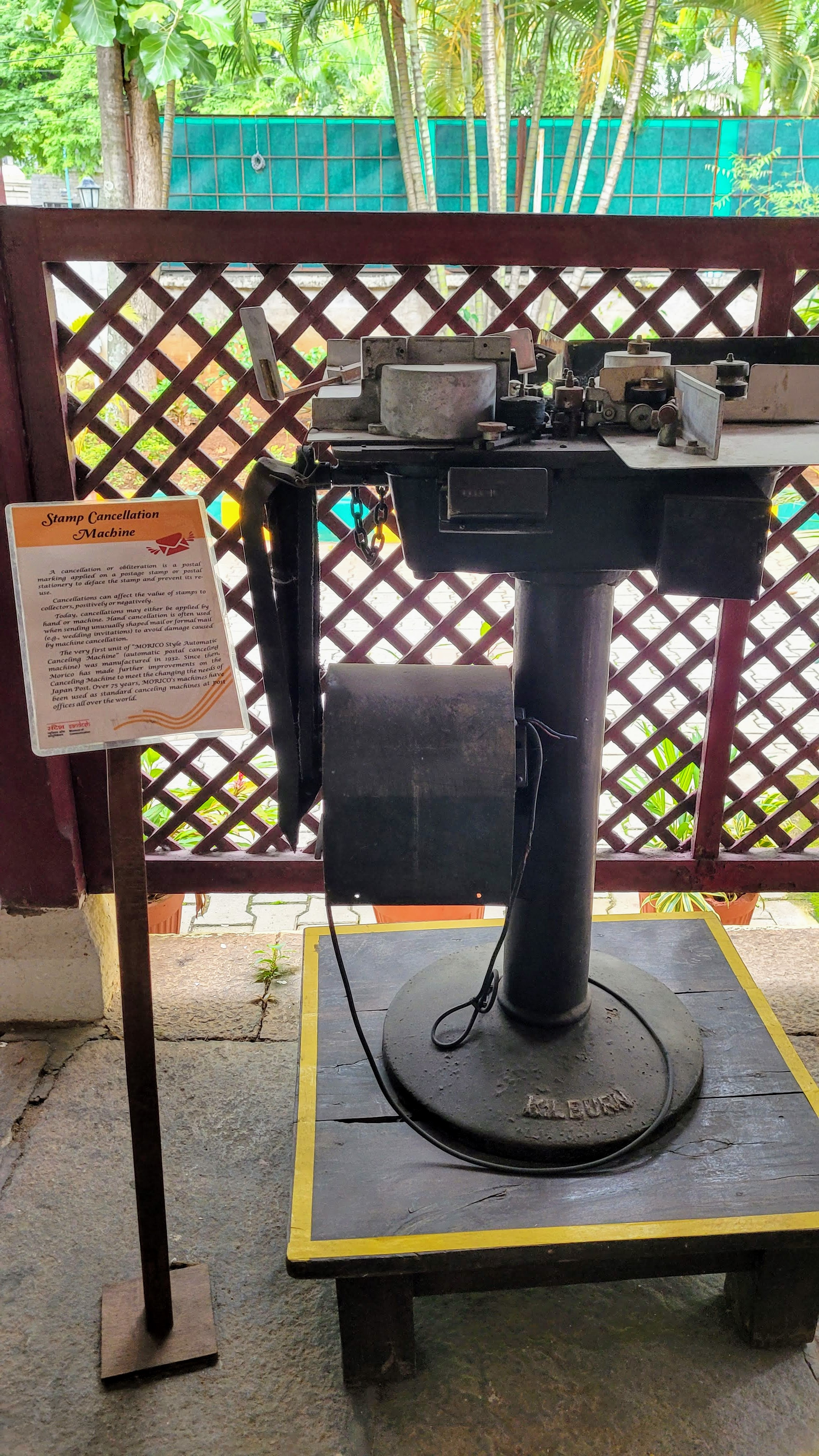
Stamp Canceling Machine from Morico, displayed at Museum of Communication, Bangalore

There are six halls and the collection is divided into six segments.

First, the Sandesha section displays stamps from different periods mostly dedicated to different Indian festivals and literature, Hindustani and Carnatic Museum, and Indian cinema. The collection divided in three themes Birth of the Nation (1857–1947), Indian culture, and Mysore Anche (1701–1889).

Second, Samparka is dedicated to all the instruments involved in the process of communication, such as handle cradle machine, adding and listening machine, morse transmitter, mail bomb detector and petromax light.

The third, Samputa gallery tells the story of postal inspector who was in charge of the quality of the postal service, his annual reports were pasted in a book to be preserved and a report from 1889 is on display here along with old mail bags and sorting cases of the postman, and archival images of floating post office on Dal Lake.

The fourth gallery is called Samvahana which is the name of the VSAT satellite used for transferring money orders in mid 1900's and one of the antennas was extant at the Bangalore General Post Office a few years ago. The VSAT apparatus is displayed in this gallery.

A fifth gallery named as Sangathi displays notable objects such as restored post-office clocks, brass weights and rain coats and coloured bags used by postman.

Sixth gallery Sangraha, exhibits the philatelic collection with one of the prominent on show is a Penny Black, originally introduced in the United Kingdom in 1840. Apart from this the gallery has a philascope and Signascope for viewing different aspects of a stamp, like its watermark, paper irregularities and grills.

The gallery hosts a children's activity area with interactive quiz machines.
