= Andries Sanders =

Dutch psychologist

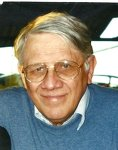

Andries Frans Sanders (born 4 April 1933) is a Dutch psychologist. In the 1980s he was professor at RWTH Aachen Technical University and served as director of its Institut für Psychologie. Sanders was professor of psychology at the Vrije Universiteit Amsterdam between 1989 and 1998.

== Life ==
Sanders was born on 4 April 1933 in Amsterdam. In 1957 Sanders started working at the Institute for Perception RVO-TNO (Dutch: Instituut voor Zintuigfysiologie) and became the first psychologist employed there. He first worked under supervision of John van de Geer, but received his PhD with honors in 1963 at Utrecht University under supervision of Johannes Linschoten. In 1966 he organised and convened a meeting on attention and performance which would subsequently become a symposium series. In 1968 he was one of the founders of the Dutch association for psychonomy. In the 1980s he worked as professor and director of the Institut für Psychologie of RWTH Aachen University.

Sanders was a professor of cognitive psychology, psychonomics, experimental psychology and theoretical psychology at the Vrije Universiteit Amsterdam between 1989 and 1998. At the Vrije Universiteit he also served as dean of the faculty of social sciences.

Sanders was elected a member of the Royal Netherlands Academy of Arts and Sciences in 1996. He was awarded an honorary doctorate by the Vrije Universiteit Brussel.

== Research ==
Sanders' published research is characterised by a close relationship between basic and applied ergonomic questions. This is already evident from his early work on the effect of loud noise on performance and on his dissertation work on orientation in the functional visual field. Another research theme was the analysis of choice reactions, inspired by the Additive Factors Method developed by Saul Sternberg in the 1960s. In this work application was evident in his studies on the effects of psychopharma and sleep deprivation on choice reaction processes; this led to his most quoted publication "Towards a model of stress and Human performance". Sanders also worked on short-term memory, basic as well as applied in situations where people are required to briefly remember a sequence of letters or digits. In 1998 he published "Elements of Human performance" a review of the literature of his main interests in which, again, the cohesion between basic and applied research was a main theme.
