= Museum of Communication (Nuremberg) =

Museum in Germany

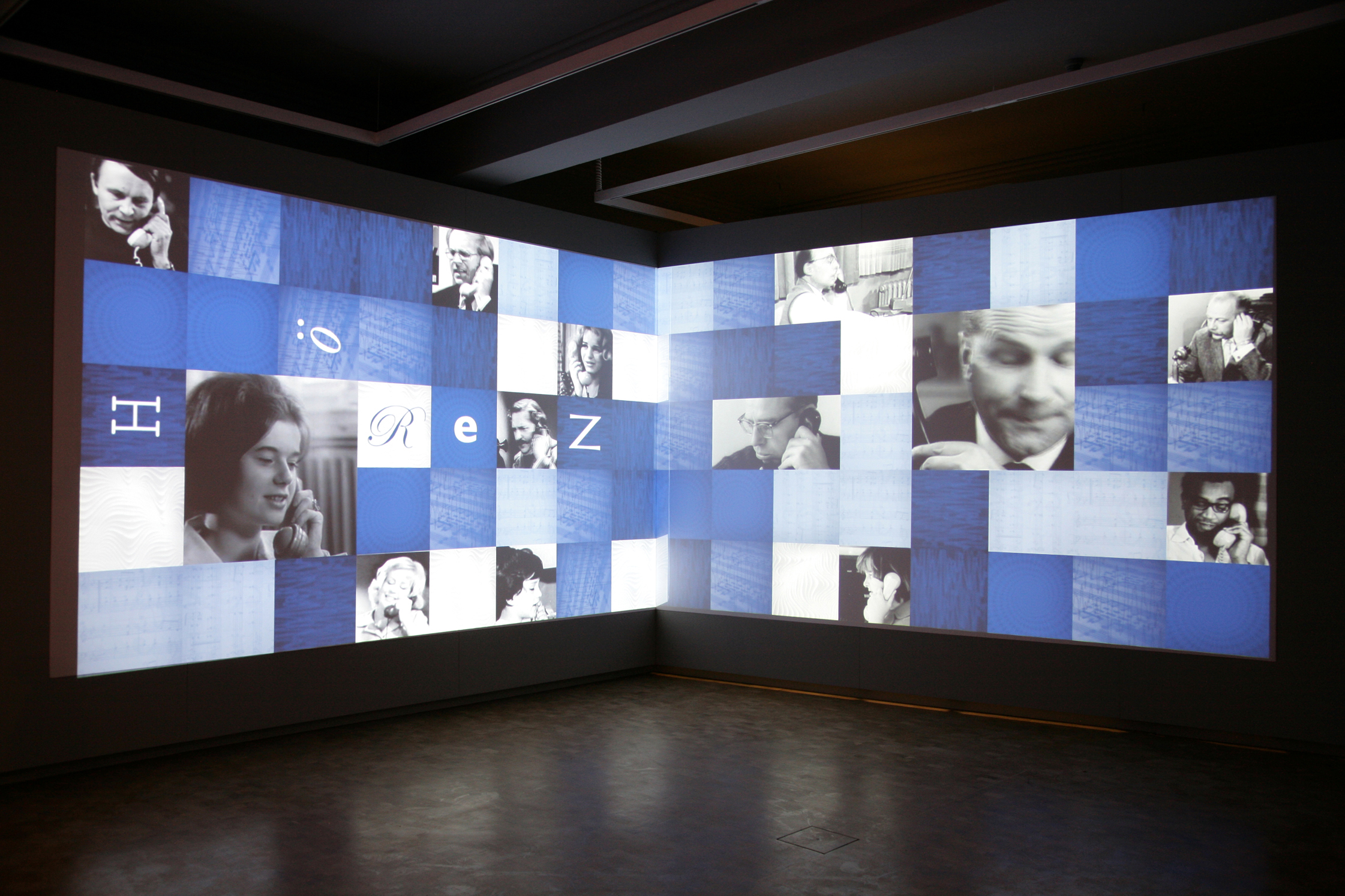
- Entrance Area
- Established: 1902
- Location: Lessingstrasse 6, D-90443 Nuremberg, Germany
- Coordinates: 49°26′44″N 11°04′28″E
- Director: Marion Grether (from January 1, 2013)
- Website: Museum of Communication Nuremberg

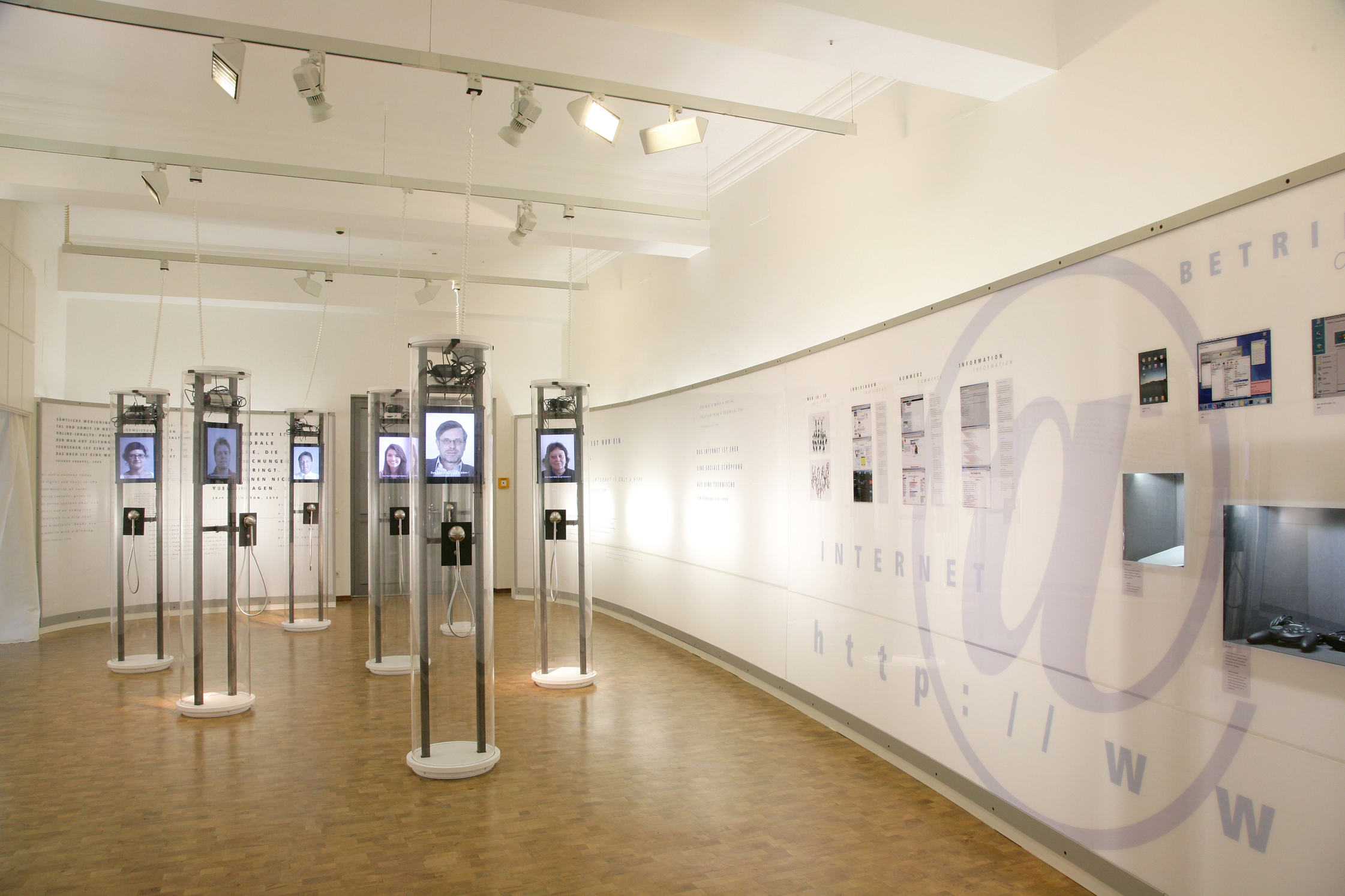
Exhibition Room "Internet"

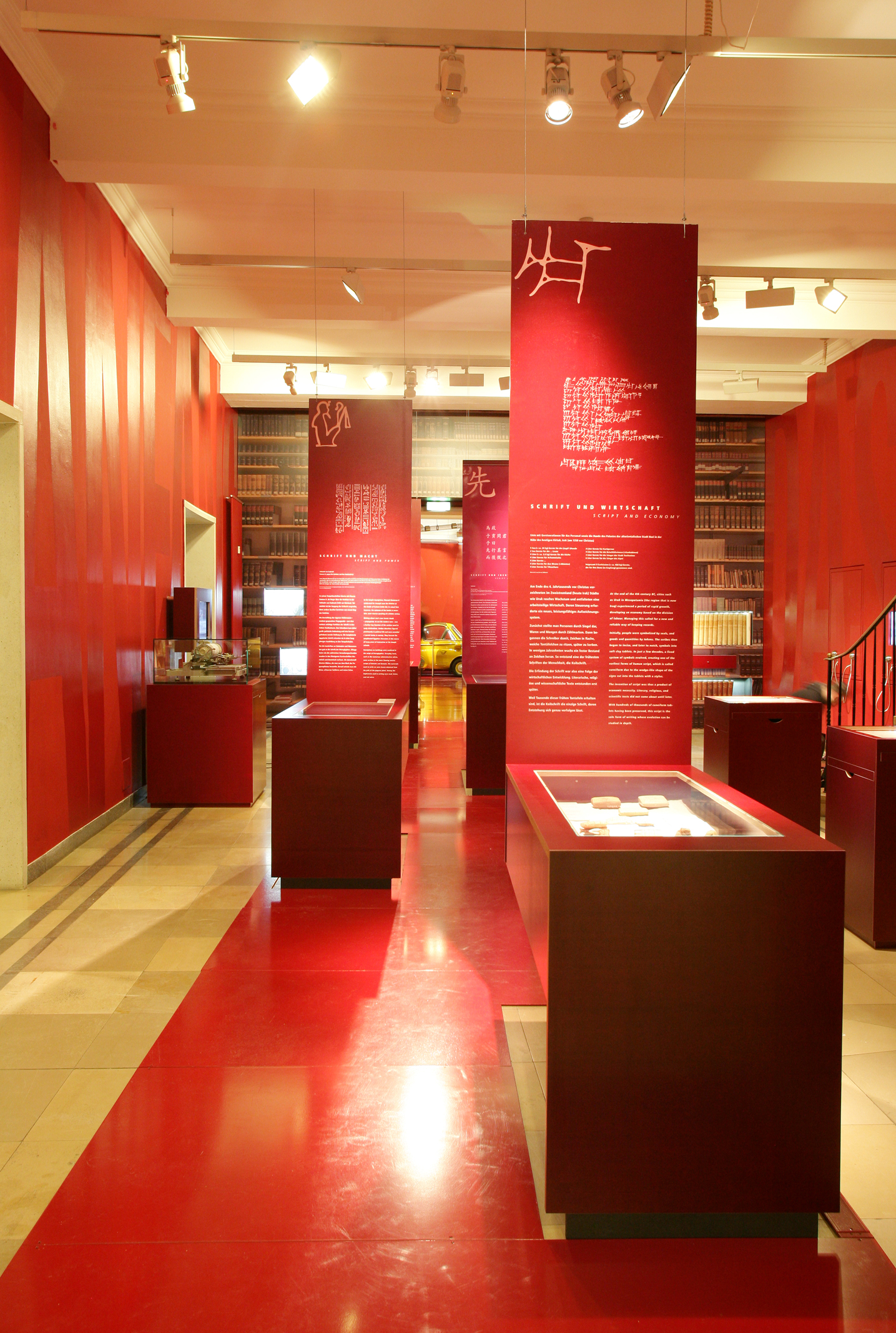
Exhibition Room "Texts"

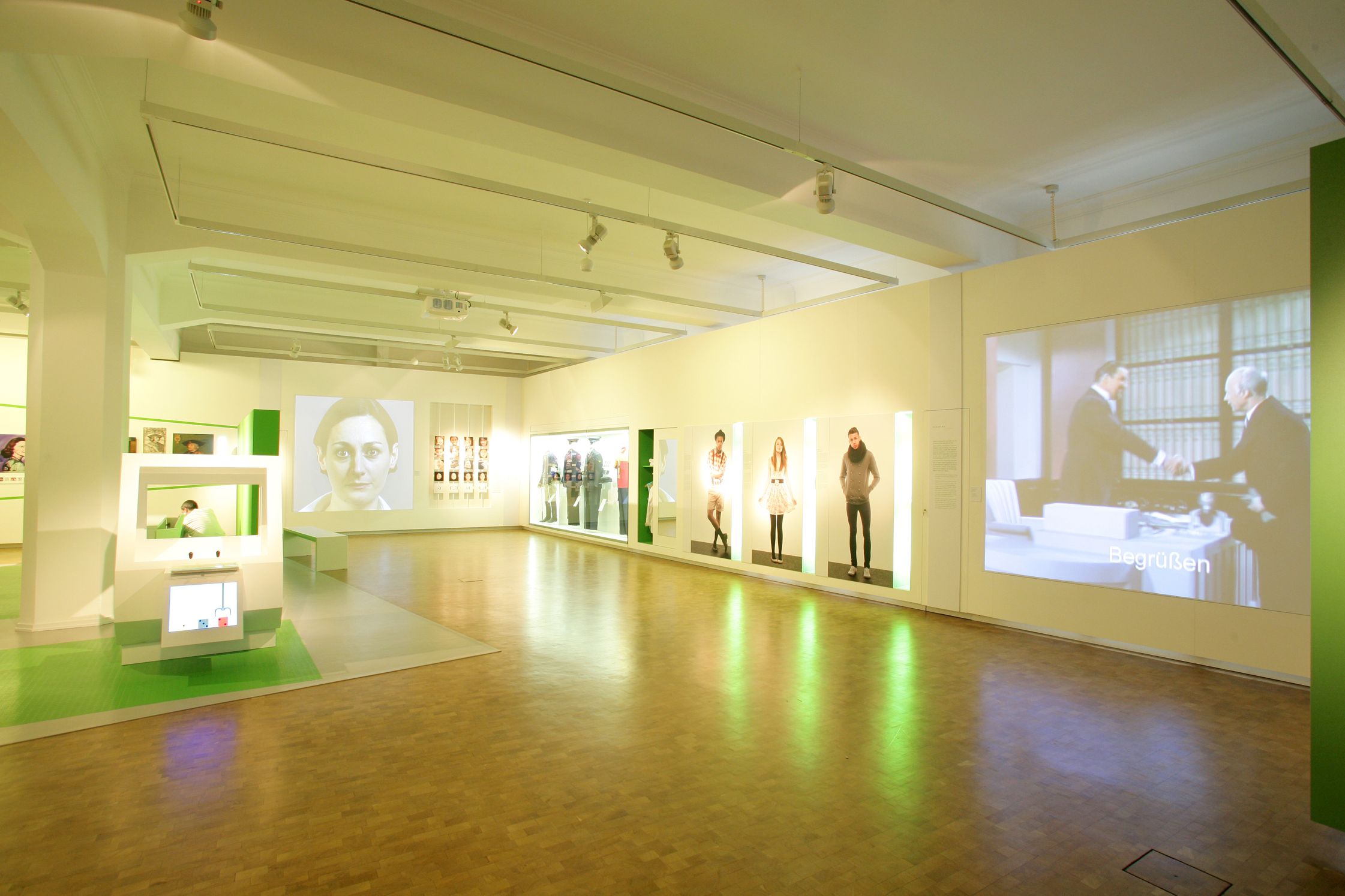
Exhibition Room "Images"

The Museum of Communication is co-located with the Nuremberg Transport Museum in Nuremberg, Germany. It shows various ways in which people communicate with each other. Together with the Museum of Communication Berlin, the Museum of Communication Frankfurt and the Philatelic Archive in Bonn it belongs to the Museum Foundation Post and Telecommunications.

== Exhibition ==
The exhibition's four rooms address the subject of communication – sounds, images, texts, or internet. Exhibits include the first German telephone, postal delivery vehicles and various communication equipment.

The collection includes over 400 objects. Interactive stations invite visitors to become a part of the exhibition. Participants can attend a writing workshop, send a message via the pneumatic post, or play the role of television presenter.

One of the exhibition's key design elements is matching the architecture to the themes covered in the respective room.
