= Andries Beeckman =

Dutch painter

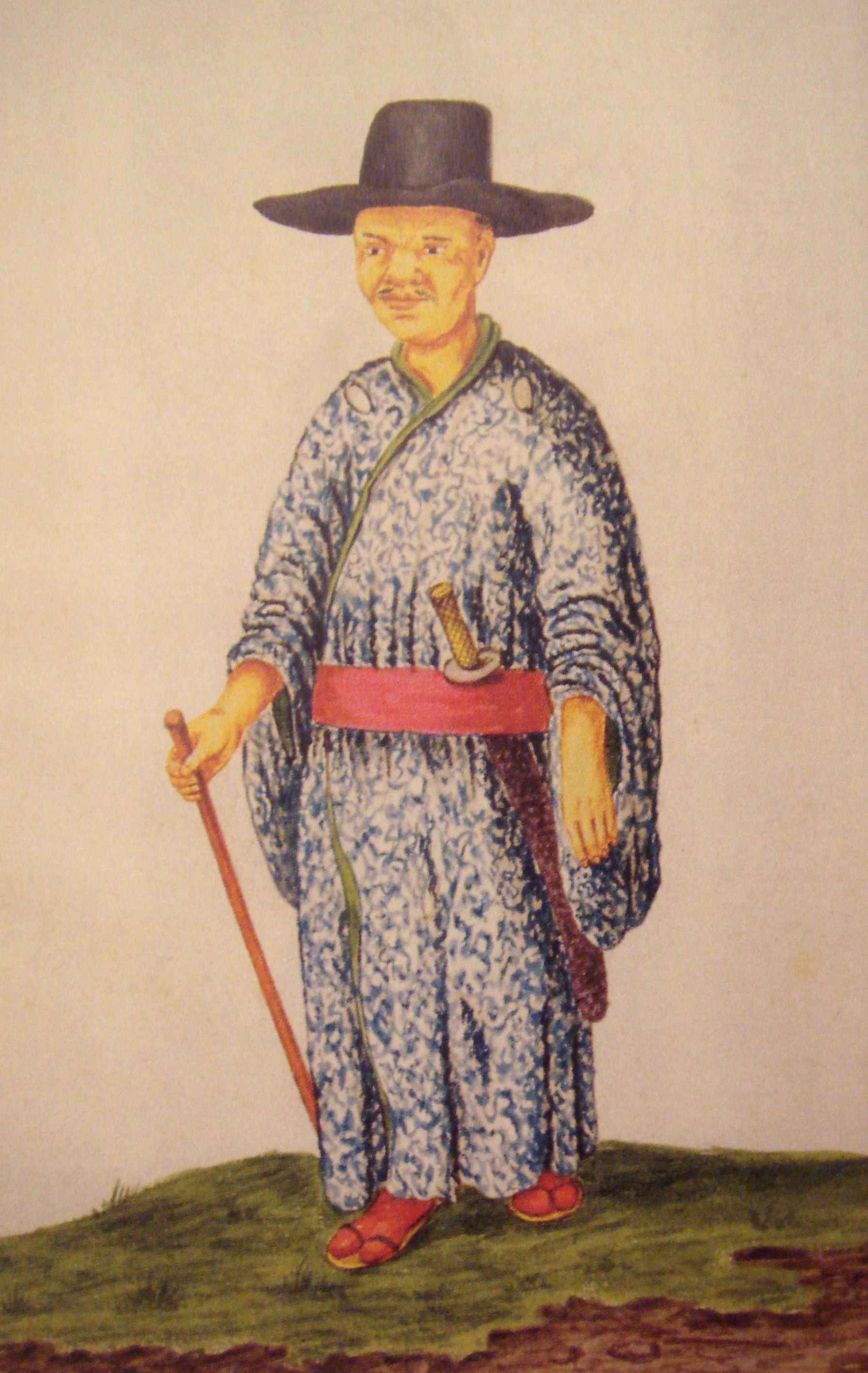
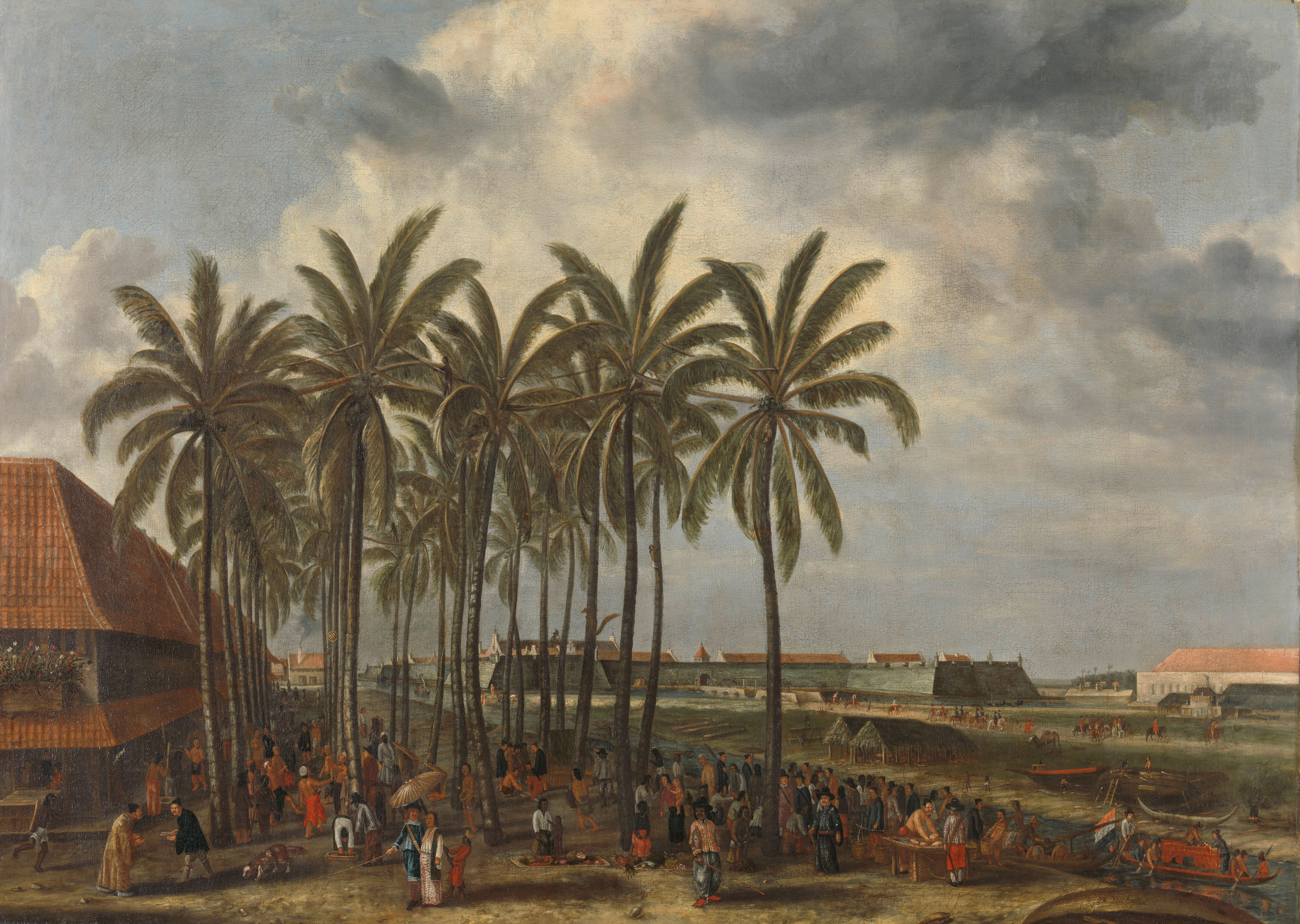
Left image: Japanese Christian remained in Jakarta after Sakoku, c. 1656, by Andries Beeckman. Christianity indicated by the hat.
Right image: The same Japanese appears on the right, in the forefront. The Castle of Batavia by Andries Beeckman, c. 1656.

Andries Beeckman (baptized 31 August 1628, Hasselt – buried 9 August 1664, Amsterdam) was a Dutch painter of the 17th century. He is especially famous for his paintings of Southeast Asia and Batavia c. 1660. In 1657 he was known as Andries Beeckman from Zutphen and is last mentioned as finishing two paintings in Amsterdam in 1663. Andries Beeckman was buried on 9 August 1664 in the Nieuwe Kerk (Amsterdam).

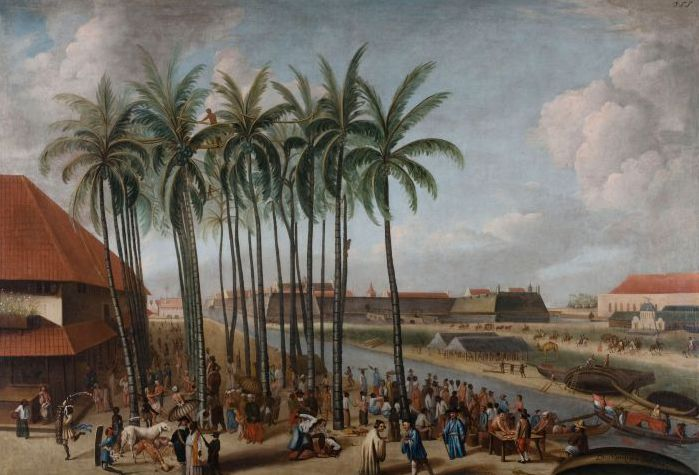
Oil painting of the castle Batavia (from Kali Besar) around 1662, collection Tropenmuseum

== See also ==
- History of Jakarta

== Publication ==
- Menno Jonker, Erlend de Groot en Caroline de Hart, Van velerlei pluimage. Zeventiende-eeuwse waterverftekeningen van Andries Beeckman. Nijmegen, Uitgeverij Van Tilt, 2014. ISBN 9789460041341
