= Museum of Post and Telecommunications =

Museum in Slovenia

Coordinates: 46°4′3″N 14°18′50.49″E

The Museum of Post and Telecommunications (Slovene: Muzej pošte in telekomunikacij) is a museum in Polhov Gradec (central Slovenia) presenting the history of mail and telecommunications.

== History ==
It was established in 1985 and is the oldest communications institution in the country.

The museum, which from 1985 until 2008 operated at Loka Castle in Škofja Loka, now resides at Polhov Gradec Manor. The relocation of the museum to Polhov Gradec is important to the towns inhabitants, as it brings a post horn of local significance - previously belonging to the Tomšič family, who lived in the area - back to the town. The Tomšič family previously ran the Polhov Gradec post office, from 1869 onwards.

== Exhibits ==
It is a branch of the Technical Museum of Slovenia. It is divided into several sections, including a section on the role of women as switchboard operators and telegraphists, a general history of post, and a children's area called "Živa's corner". It also keeps a collection of stamps, postal delivery vehicles (including horse-drawn carriages, motorcycles, and bicycles) and postal uniforms. It has recently added exhibitions on telecommunications, including displays detailing the history of mobile phones. The exhibitions also feature a number of films and animations on the subject of the postal and telecommunications networks.

In the courtyard of the manor in which the museum is located, there is a 17th century fountain decorated with statues of Neptune, which was restored in 2012.
