= Andries Vierlingh =

Dutch civil engineer

Andries Vierlingh (Breda, circa 1507 - Steenbergen 1579) was a Dutch civil engineer. His manuscript Tractaet van Dyckagie is seen as a warning against fundamental engineering errors in waterstaat water management, from which lessons can still be learned today.

== Life and work ==
He came from a wealthy regent family. He was the son of Nicolaas Vierling, clerk of the council and audit office of the Count of Nassau, and Wilhelmina van Vlyet. He himself was alderman of Breda in 1536 and 1537, and married Emerentia van Bruheze around 1541. He was interested in hydraulic engineering from an early age, because at the age of 20 he was already involved in the restoration of the broken dikes of Reimerswaal.

Vierlingh was one of the first hydraulic engineers to combine his work with administrative activities with which, just like Cornelis Lely much later, he brought order to the management of the land inside the dikes with technical knowledge and administrative influence, thus laying the foundation for an efficient management of inland water in the Netherlands.

He was appointed steward of Steenbergen by the Prince of Orange in 1537. He remained in this position until 1567, while in 1552 he was also appointed dijkgraaf of the Count Hendrikpolder. In the area surrounding Steenbergen, more than 4,000 hectares of new land was reclaimed between 1548 and 1554 by diking the buntings and salt marshes around the city. Vierlingh was closely involved in this as a steward and dike grapher.

Vierlingh constantly campaigned for the importance of good dykes in his Brabant native region, which was occasionally severely affected by flooding. As dike grapher he was involved in a large number of reclamations.

He regularly advised on dike works, lock construction and the construction of bank defenses in Zeeland, South Holland and North Holland. For example, in 1530 he was involved in closing holes in the harbor dike of Middelburg and he visited the flooded Reimerswaal. In 1553 he was asked for advice on the reclamation of the Zijpe. He was active in the diking of Klundert and in various other reclamations and sea defense works.

== Tractaet van Dyckagie ==
In 1567 he resigned as steward. He was then 60 years old and decided to write down his experiences in the field of water management. His plan was to compile a five-part work that would bring together the current state of water management knowledge and the practice of water management. However, he was only able to carry out half of this plan before his death in 1579. In it he gave a technical treatise on the construction of dikes in the sixteenth century. But he also criticized the many mistakes made in the field of water management. The dike graves in particular had to suffer. For example, he blamed the lord of Reimerswaal, Adriaan van Lodijcke, for not closing a dike gap so that a port could be created. For example, the Sint Felix Flood of 1530 was able to flood a large part of the Land of Reimerswaal for good.

His manuscript, which is now in the Dutch Nationaal Archief, was published in 1920 by J. de Hullu and A.G. Verhoeven published under the title Tractaet van Dyckagie. Hydraulic engineering advice and experiences of Andries Vierlingh in the National Historical Publications (RGP). Because this edition was sold out for a long time but the content was still popular, the Dutch Association of Coastal and Riparian Works (VBKO) decided on a photomechanical reprint in 1973.
