= Andries Hoogerwerf (political scientist) =

Dutch political scientist (1931–2024)

Andries Hoogerwerf (11 March 1931 – 25 March 2024) was a Dutch political scientist and public administration scholar. He was a professor of political science at the Radboud University Nijmegen and public administration theory at the University of Twente.

== Life ==
Hoogerwerf was born on 11 March 1931 in Delft. For his secondary school education he attended the Hogere Burgerschool. In 1960 he obtained a degree from the Vrije Universiteit Amsterdam, which was followed by a doctorate from the same university in 1964.

Hoogerwerf worked as a journalist between 1948 and 1960, producing content in the fields of parliamentary affairs as well as interior and foreign affairs. In 1960 he started as a scientific employee at the Vrije Universiteit Amsterdam. In 1968 he was named lector in political science at the same institute. The next year he became professor of political science at Radboud University Nijmegen. In 1977 he gave his inaugural speech as professor of public administration theory at the University of Twente. He retired in 1993. In a 2004 article in the scientific journal Bestuurswetenschappen authors J.K.J. Talen and R.C.P. Swieringa called Hoogerwerf one of the most important Dutch scholars of public administration theory of the previous 25 years.

Hoogerwerf was elected a member of the Royal Netherlands Academy of Arts and Sciences in 1991. Together with Ig Snellen he won the L.P. van de Spiegelprijs in 2013.
