= Museum of Communication Frankfurt =

Communication museum in Frankfurt, Germany

Museum for Communication Frankfurt
- Museum für Kommunikation Frankfurt
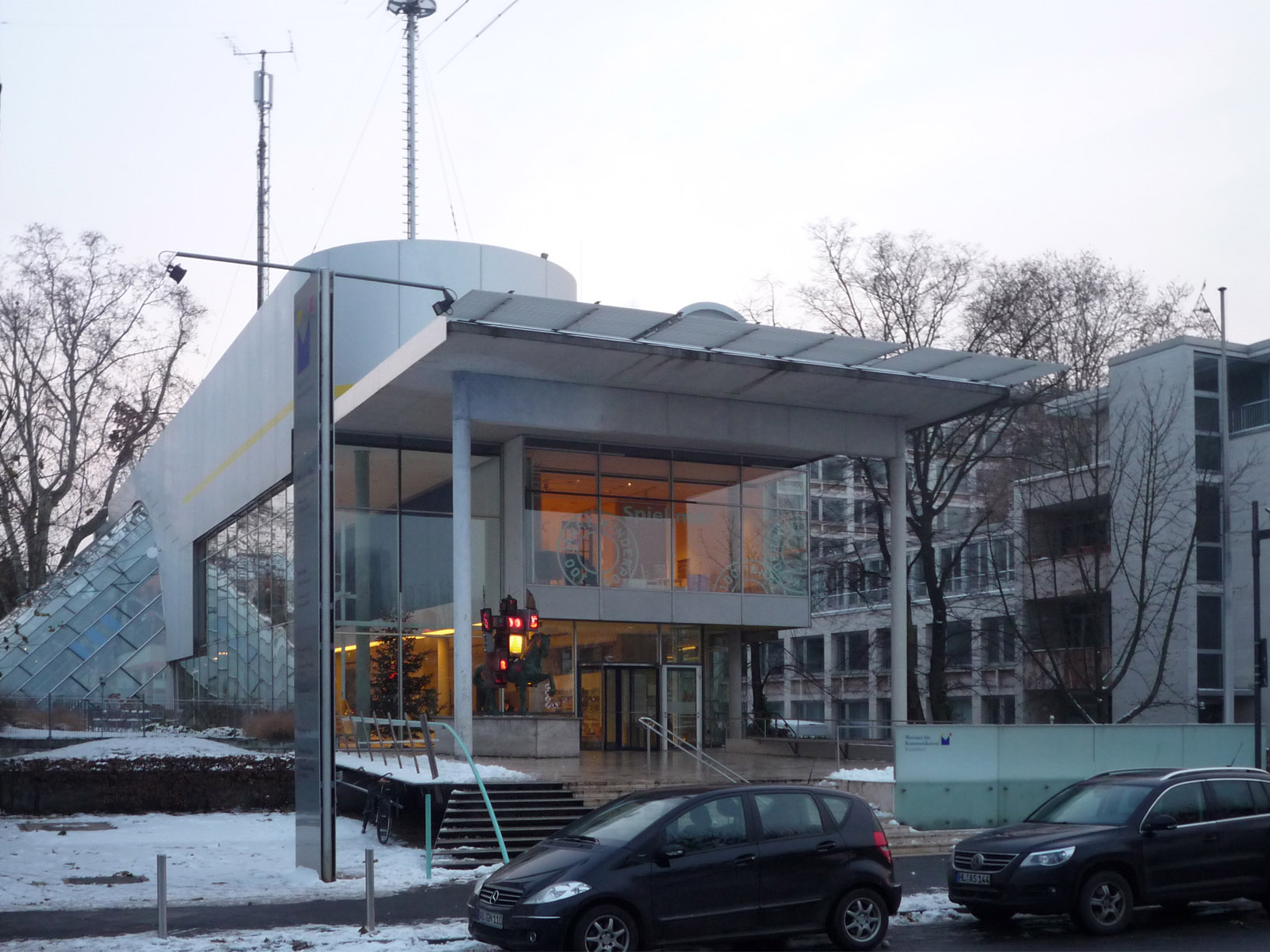
- The Museum für Kommunikation Frankfurt in 2010
- Former name: Museum für Post und Kommunikation; Bundespostmuseum
- Established: 1958/1990
- Location: Schaumainkai 53, Museumsufer, Frankfurt, Germany
- Coordinates: 50°06′16″N 8°40′33″E
- Type: Museum
- Visitors: 112,625 (2018)
- Architect: Günter Behnisch
- Public transit access: Schweizer Platz; Willy-Brandt-Platz; 16 Schweizerstraße/Gartenstraße

The Museum für Kommunikation (MfK) is a museum of the history of communication in Frankfurt, Germany. It opened on 31 January 1958 under the name Bundespostmuseum (National Postal Museum) and is on Frankfurt's Museumsufer (Museum Riverbank).

The museum was owned by Deutsche Bundespost until 1994. The present building, a modern and transparent glass structure, opened in 1990 and was designed by architect Günter Behnisch. Following the opening of the new building, the museum acquired its present name, and it is now managed by the Museum Trust for Post and Telecommunications, which was established in 1995 during the federal postal reforms that followed re-unification. The museum has two sister institutions: the Museum of Communication, Nuremberg, Germany, and the Museum für Kommunikation Berlin. Together with the Philatelic Archive in Bonn they belong to the Museum Foundation Post and Telecommunications.

== Exhibition ==
The main exhibition of the museum is located on the underground level. It features a comprehensive history of the development and spread of various methods of communication throughout human history, including mail, telegraph, telephone, radio, television and computer, as well as objects relating to these mediums. It had its beginnings with a collection established in Berlin by Heinrich von Stephan (1831–97), which was expanded by Deutsche Bundespost from 1958. It now has displays ranging from the earliest Cuneiform tablets to the latest digital technology.

An information center and the museum shop and café are located on the ground level. The first floor features a children's exhibition area, while temporary exhibits are found on the second floor.

== Gallery ==
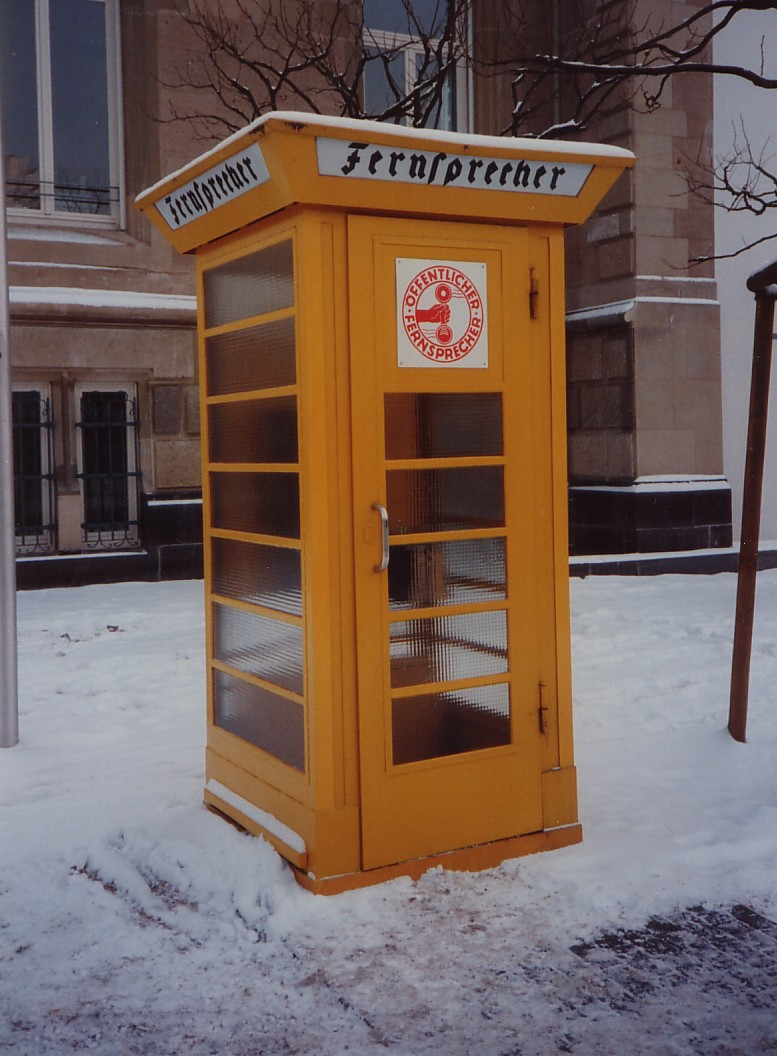
Telephone booth, Deutsche Reichspost

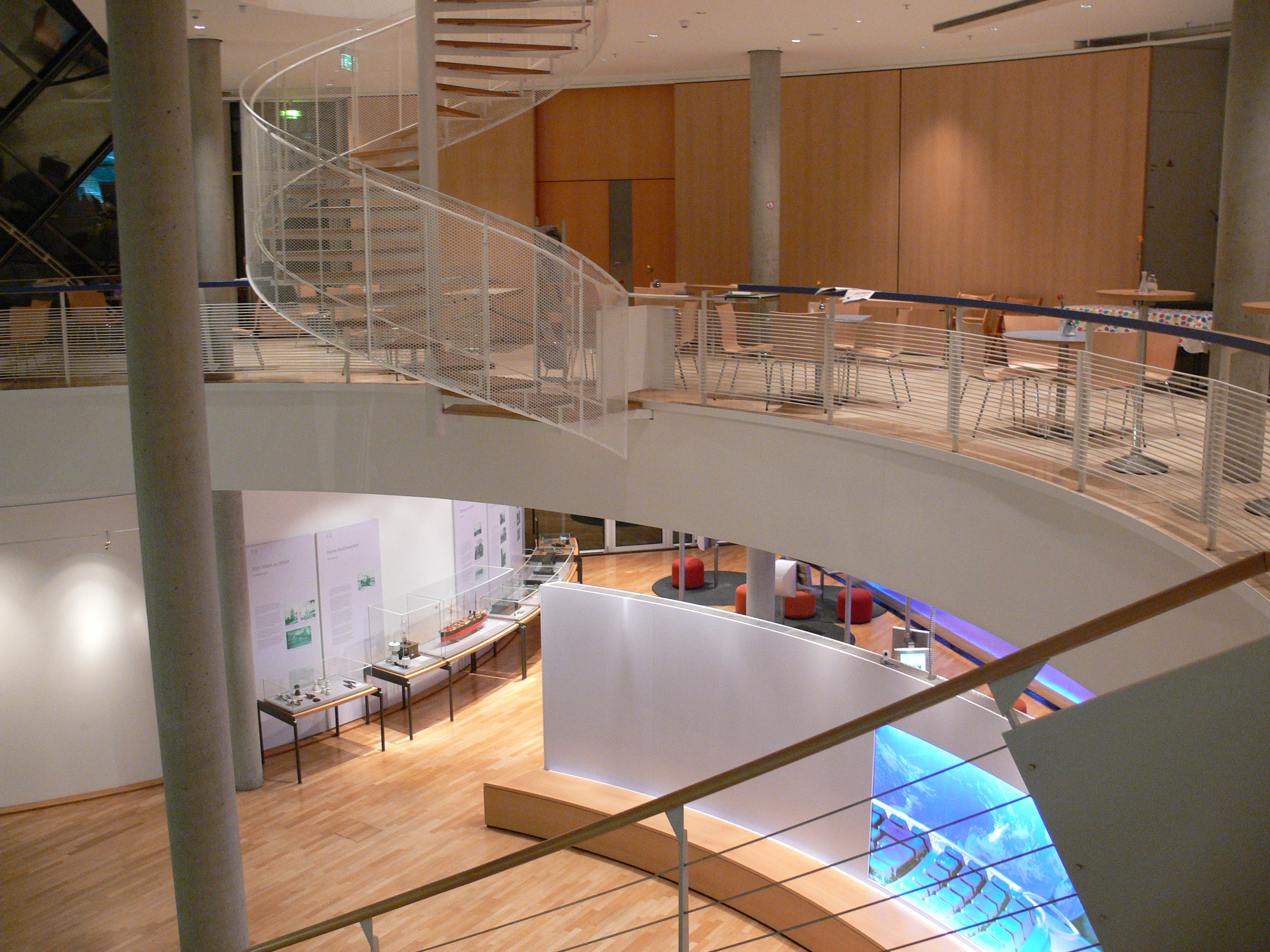
View from the ground floor to the basement

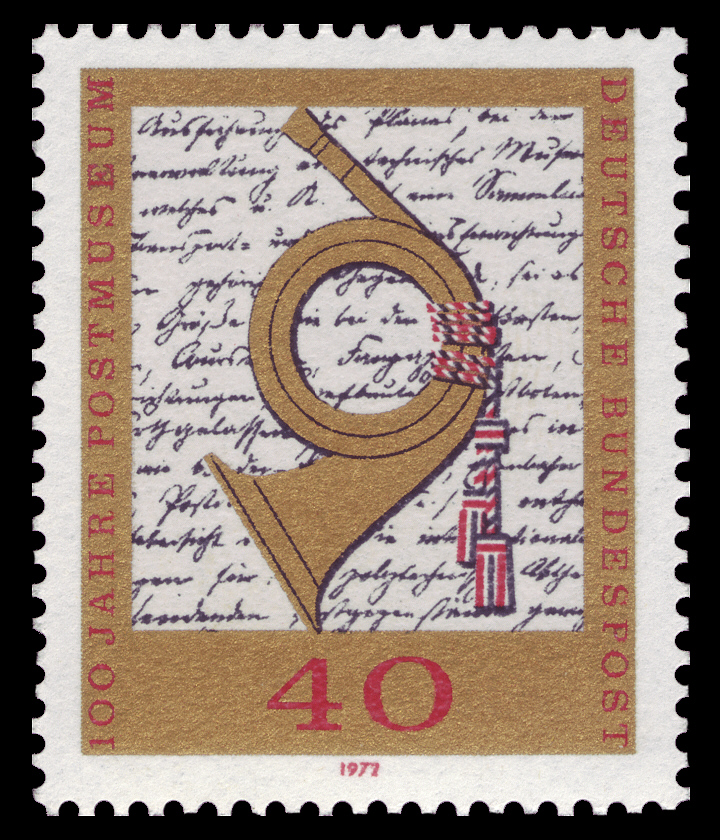
Stamp: 100 years of the museum for post in Frankfurt

== Depot ==
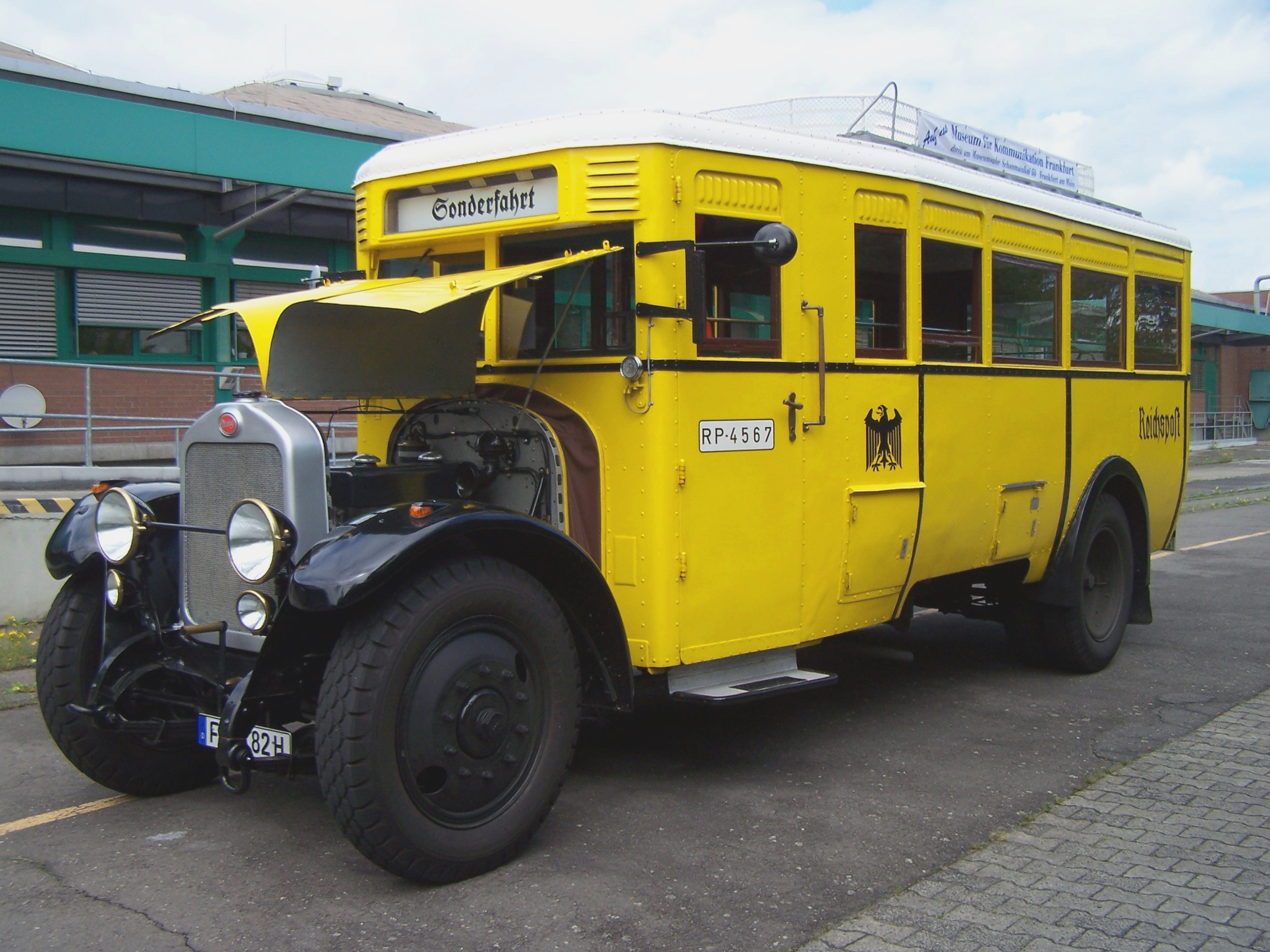
DAAG Postbus, Depot Heusenstamm

- Sammlungsstandort Heusenstamm, Philipp-Reis-Straße 4–8

== See also ==
- Museum of Communication, Nuremberg, Germany
