= Andries Botha (artist) =

South African sculptor

- Born: Andries Johannes Botha; 22 September 1952 (age 73); Pretoria, South Africa
- Education: University of Natal
- Occupations: Artist; political activist

Andries Johannes Botha (born 22 September 1952) is a South African artist and political activist who lives and works in Durban, KwaZulu-Natal, South Africa. He is known for his sculpture.

== Early life and education ==
Botha was born in Pretoria, and graduated from the University of Natal in the 1970s.

== Career ==
As a young man, Botha engaged in printmaking and sculpture, and founded and chaired the Community Arts Workshop (1984–86). He won several awards for his art, including the Volkskas Atelier Merit Award in 1987, the Cape Town Triennial Merit Award (1988), the Standard Bank Young Artist Award (1990) and the National Vita Art Award (1992). He created artwork based on traditional indigenous craft techniques.

Botha began lecturing at the Durban University of Technology in 1998. He founded the NGO Create Africa South Trust in 2002.

In 2006 Botha was invited to participate in the "Table of Free Voices" in Berlin. His creation "Dropping Knowledge" asked leaders in the fields of creative and scientific thinking to answer 100 questions put to them by the public simultaneously at a round table. That year he was commissioned for the Beaufort Triennale.

Botha founded the Amazwi Abesifazane Trust, registered in 2008, and the Human Elephant Foundation, (registered 2009)

Botha has exhibited his drawings and sculptures in Brittany, the Canary Islands during 2008, South Korea during 2011 and locally in South Africa during 2010 and 2011.

Botha set up the Andries Botha Foundation (registered 2012). In 2012 he participated in "Planet under Pressure" in London where leaders in their fields discussed issues pertaining to sustainable development and the threats to the planet.

Botha has used his art to comment on the social and political challenges of his time. He also has created works on a variety of themes, including the co-existence of humans with other life forms, creativity, citizenship and lifelong learning.

In 2010 work on a sculpture that he was creating for the eThekwini Municipality was halted because the design was said to be too close to the logo of a political party. The sculpture was to be a group of elephants. After several years of negotiations, a somewhat altered design was agreed upon and Botha once more began work. In the meantime, much of the framework which Both had installed had been stolen and sold for scrap metal. The sculptures were also damaged with red and black paint.

== Publications ==
- Andries Botha, "US Wordfest Artist, 2010, 24 pp, colour illus, paperback, Stellenbosch, 2010
- Andries Botha, "Standard Bank Young Artist Award", 1991, 24 pages
