= Johannes Kaltenboeck =

Austrian writer

Johannes Kaltenboeck (Bozen, 29 June 1853 - c. 1919) was a writer from Austria-Hungary known for his adventure stories. He had three pen names: Max Felde, Fritz Holten and Andries van Straaden.

His life is not well-documented. He started publishing several novels regularly from 1897 to 1917 in the Der Gute Kamerad collections, and he served as the director of this publication after Wilhelm Speemann. He also wrote patriotic tales during World War I, and his novel about aeroplanes Das Aeromobil, was very successful.

== Works ==
=== As Max Felde ===
- Der Arrapahu (1900)
- Addy, der Rifleman (1900)
- Das Astoria-Abenteuer (1901)
- Villa Biberheim (1903)
- Der Sohn der Wälder (1905)
- Abd ur Rahman, der Muzlime (1909)
- Denkwürdige Kriegserlebnisse (1915)
- Mit vereinten Kräften (1916)
- Das Gold vom Sacramento (1917)

=== As Andries van Straaden ===
- Der Depeschenreiter (1901)

=== As Fritz Holten ===
- Das Polarschiff (1910)
- Das Aeromobil (1912)

== Bibliography ==
- (in German) Friedrich Schegk et Heinrich Wimmer, Lexikon der Reise- und Abenteuerliteratur, Meitingen, 1988
