= Philatelic Archive in Bonn =

Coordinates: 50°42′23″N 7°8′18″E

The Philatelic Archive in Bonn (German: Archiv für Philatelie) is a philatelic museum in Bonn, Germany.

The Philatelic Archive in Bonn is operated by the Museum Foundation Post and telecommunications. The museum documents the history of philately of the first postage stamps in Germany to the latest specials stamps. The collection includes not only valuable rarities and freshly printed new editions but also has original designs, rehearsal prints, stationery, printing block and much more. One of the most famous exhibits is a copy of the Blue Mauritius.

The core of the archive is the so-called "General Collection", which today has more than 800 albums. The general objective of the collection is to house every stamp ever published.

The museum has a sheet copy of the Yellow Cathedral postage stamp insured for one million euros.
