= Postal museum =

Type of museum focused on the history of postal services

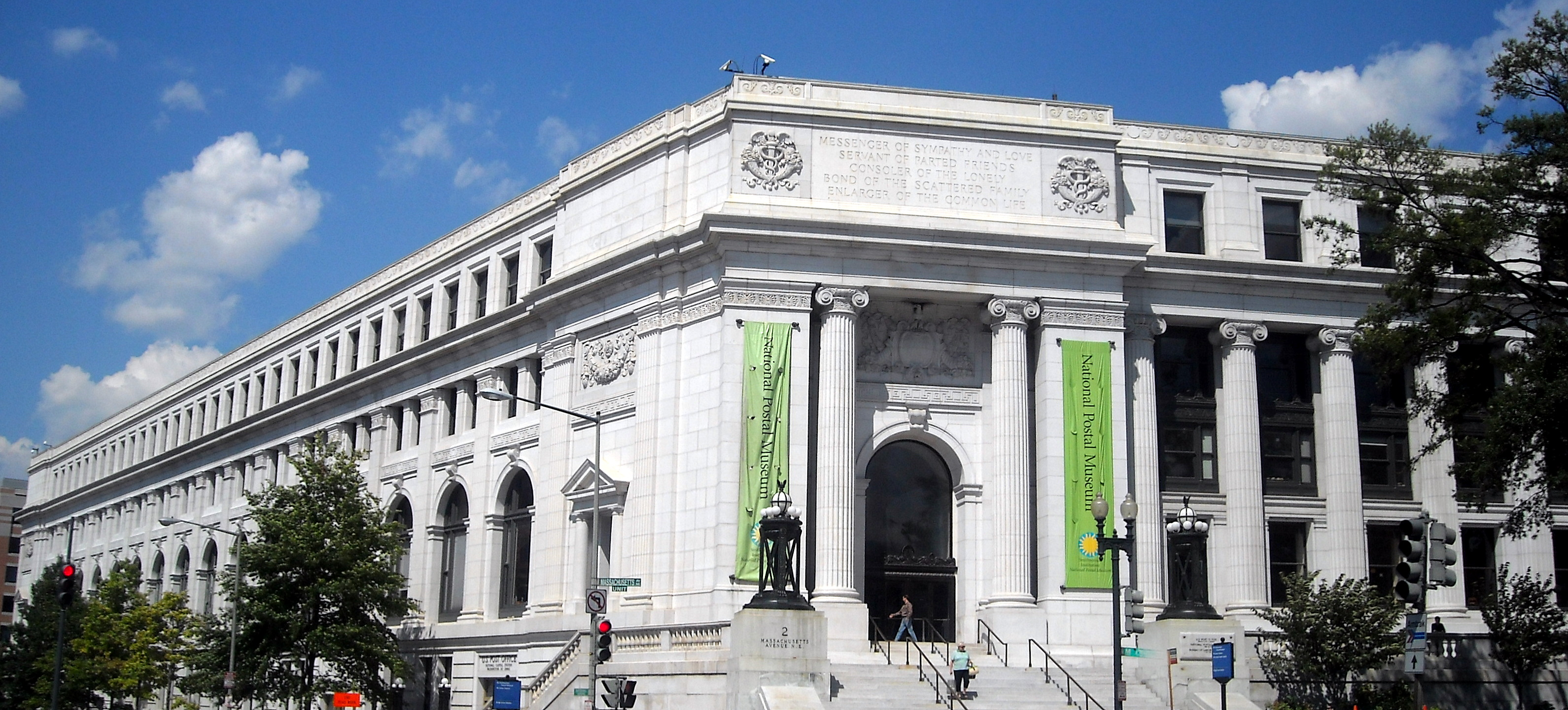
The National Postal Museum at Postal Square Building in Washington, D.C., United States

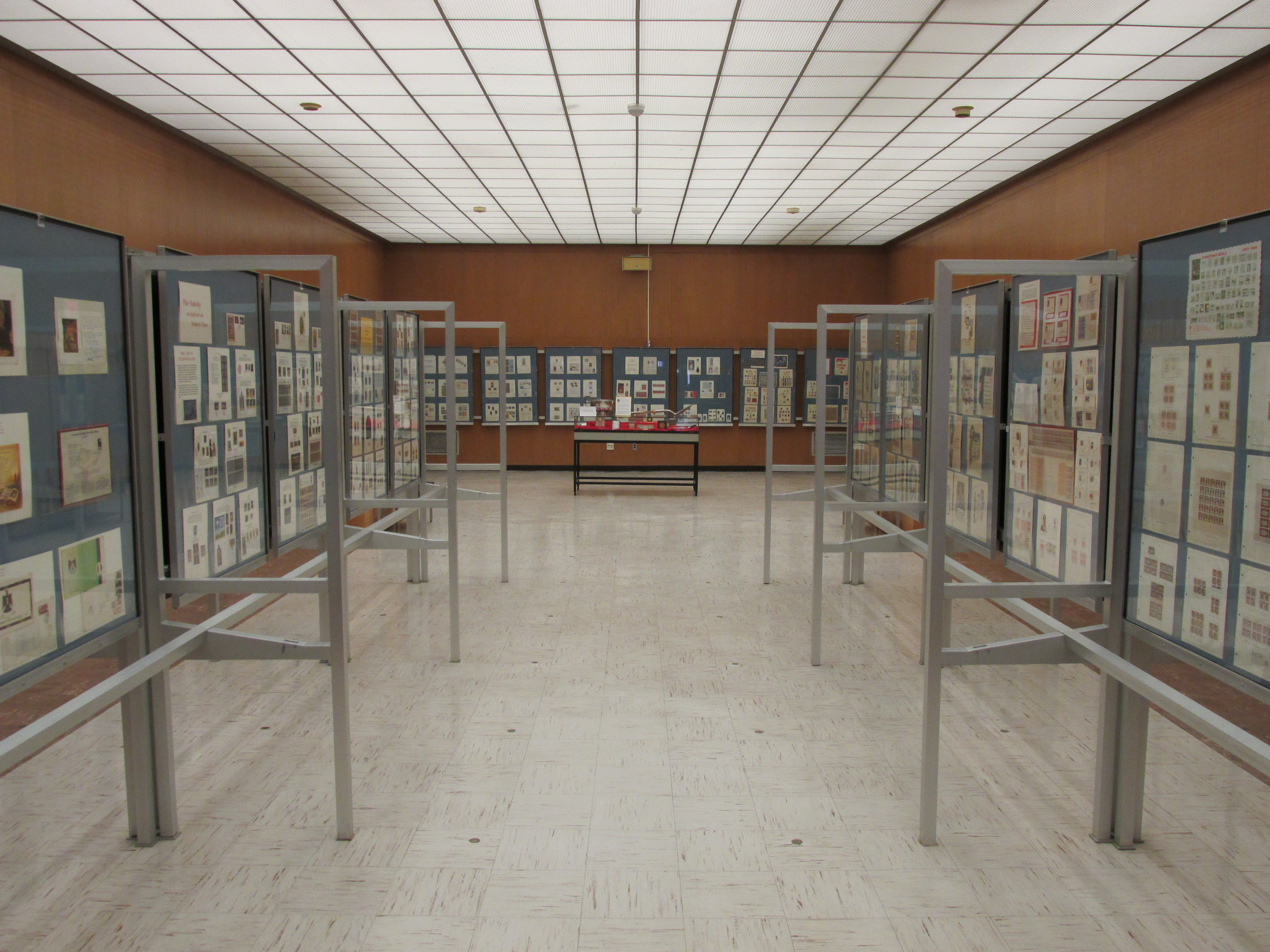
The Spellman Museum of Stamps & Postal History at Regis College in Weston, Massachusetts, US

A postal museum is a museum dedicated to the display of objects relating to the postal service. A subcategory of postal museums are philatelic museums, which focus on philately and postage stamps.

== List of postal and philatelic museums ==
=== Africa ===
==== Egypt ====
- The Post Museum

==== Ethiopia ====
- Ethiopian National Postal Museum

==== Kenya ====
- German Post Office Museum

==== Mauritius ====
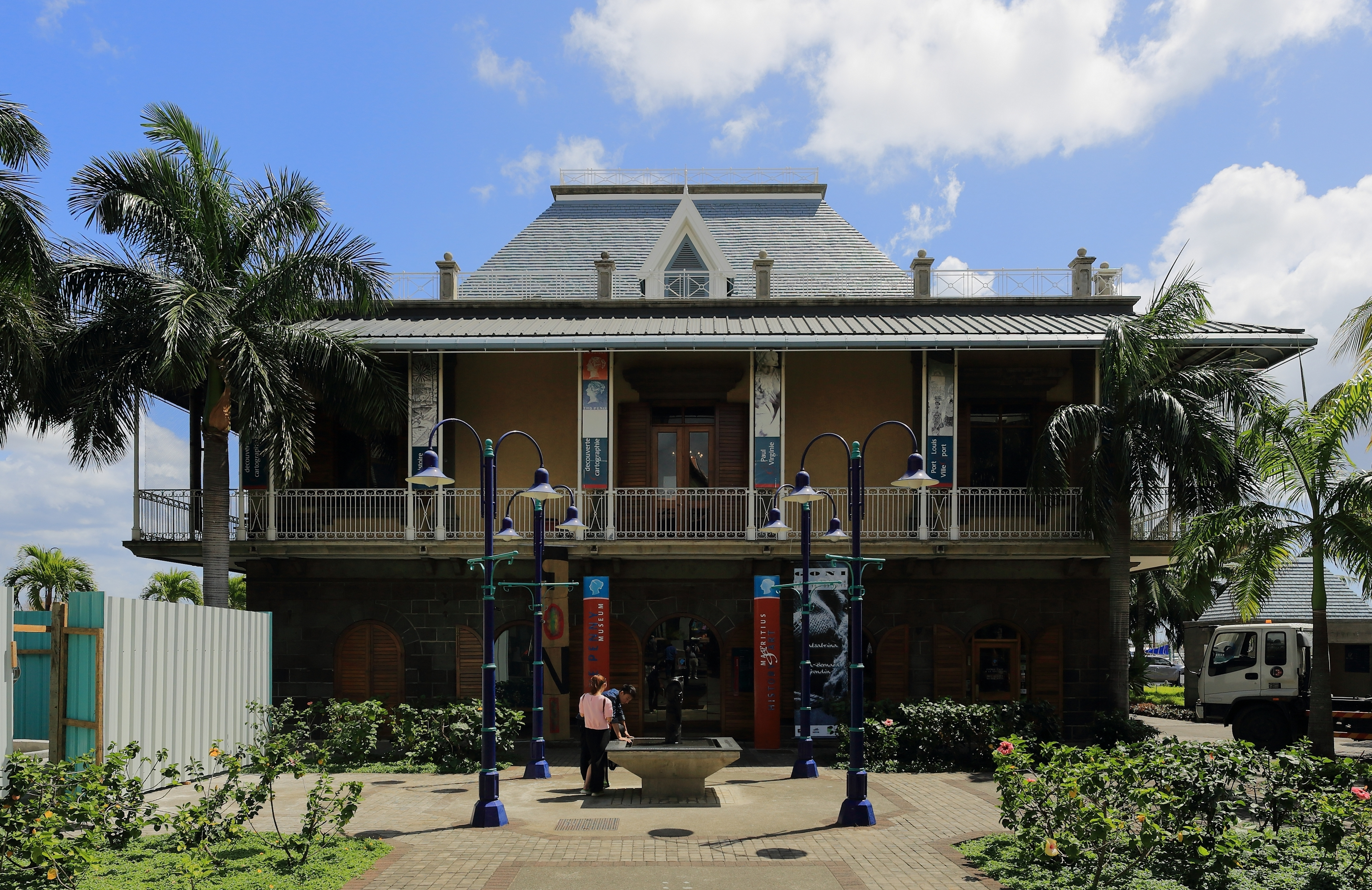
The Blue Penny Museum in Port Louis, Mauritius

- Blue Penny Museum
- Mauritius Postal Museum

==== Morocco ====
- Postal Museum

==== South Africa ====
- South African Post Office Museum

=== Americas ===
==== Brazil ====
- Museu Tempostal
- Philatelic and Numismatic Brazilian Museum

==== Canada ====
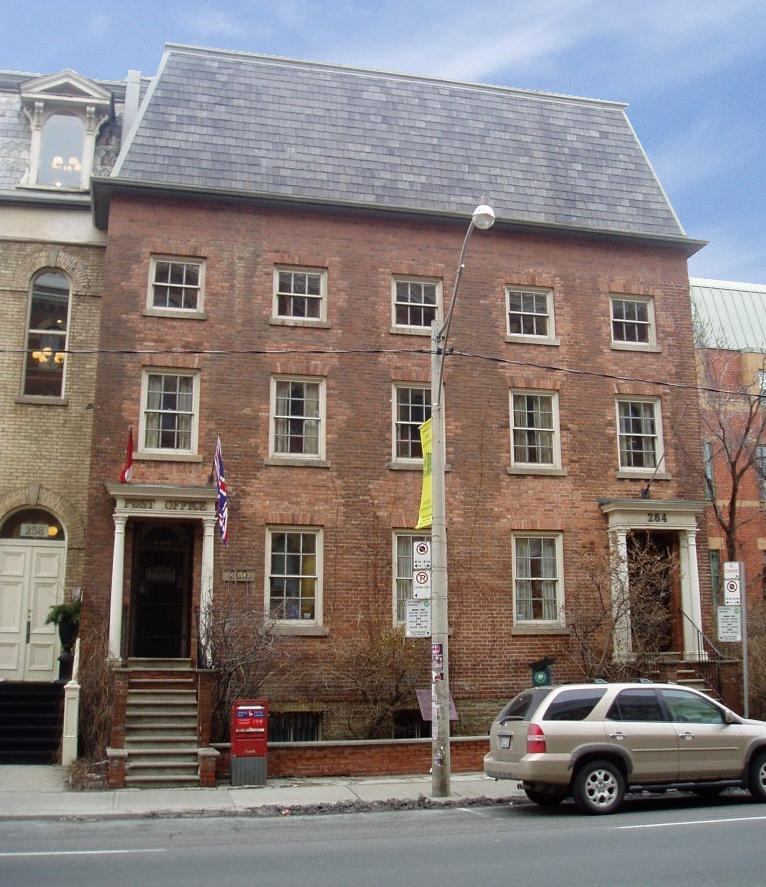
First Toronto Post Office in Toronto, Canada

- Canadian Postal Museum (closed)
- First Toronto Post Office

==== Costa Rica ====
- Museo Filatélico de Costa Rica

==== Cuba ====
- Cuban Postal Museum

==== Curaçao ====
- Postal Museum Curaçao

==== Guatemala ====
- Guatemalan Postal & Philatelic Museum

==== Mexico ====
- Philatelic Museum of Oaxaca – Mexico

==== Peru ====
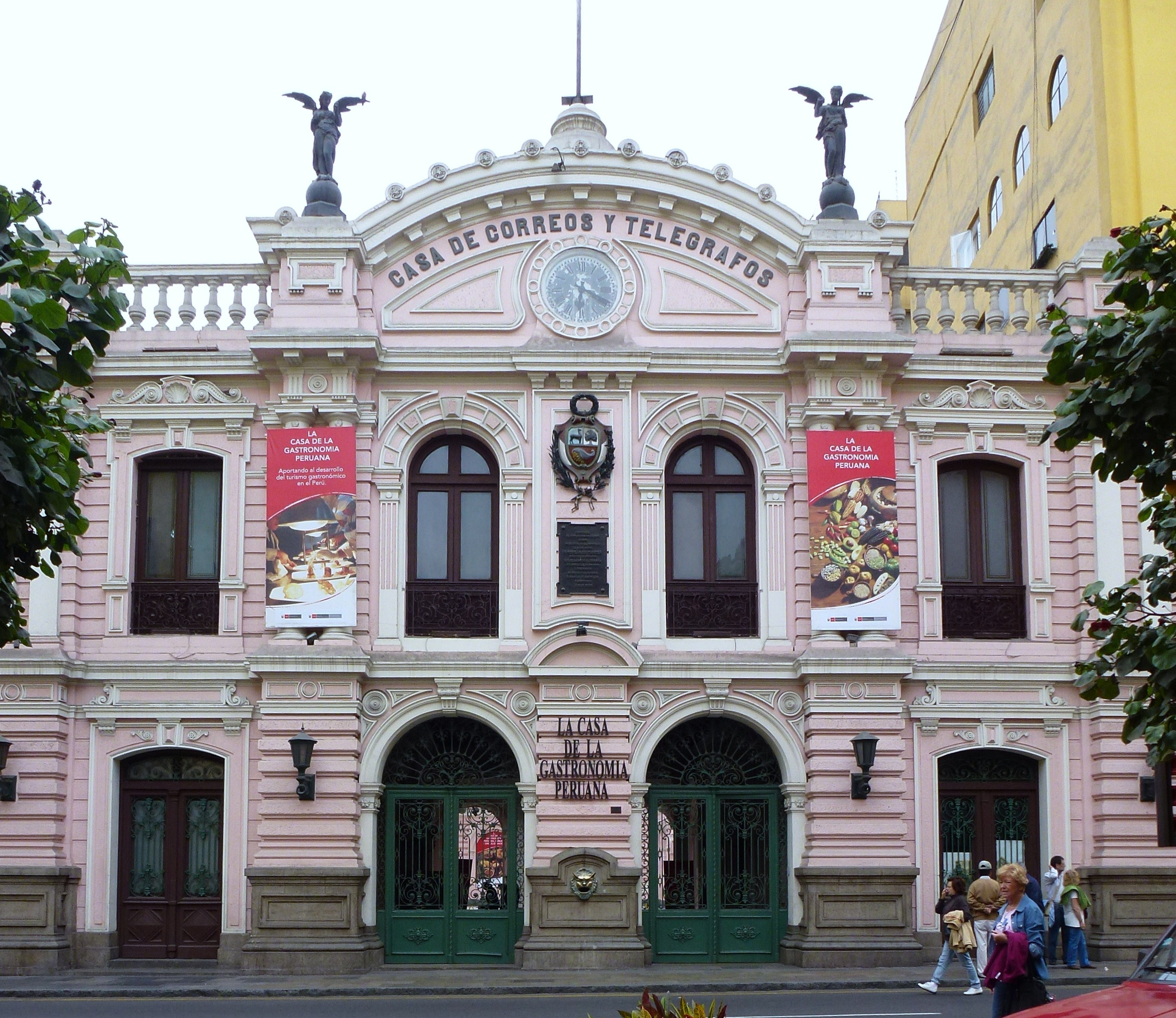
National Postal and Philatelic Museum at the Casa de Correos y Telegrafos in Lima, Peru

- National Postal and Philatelic Museum

==== United States ====
- Florida Postal Museum
- Franklin Post Office
- Garnier Post Office Museum
- The Leon Myers Stamp Center at Boys Town, near Omaha, Nebraska
- National Philatelic Museum (closed)
- National Postal Museum
- Spellman Museum of Stamps & Postal History
- The Museum of Postal History
- US Postal Museum

=== Asia ===
==== Bangladesh ====
- Philatelic Museum

==== Bhutan ====
- Bhutan Postal Museum.

==== China ====
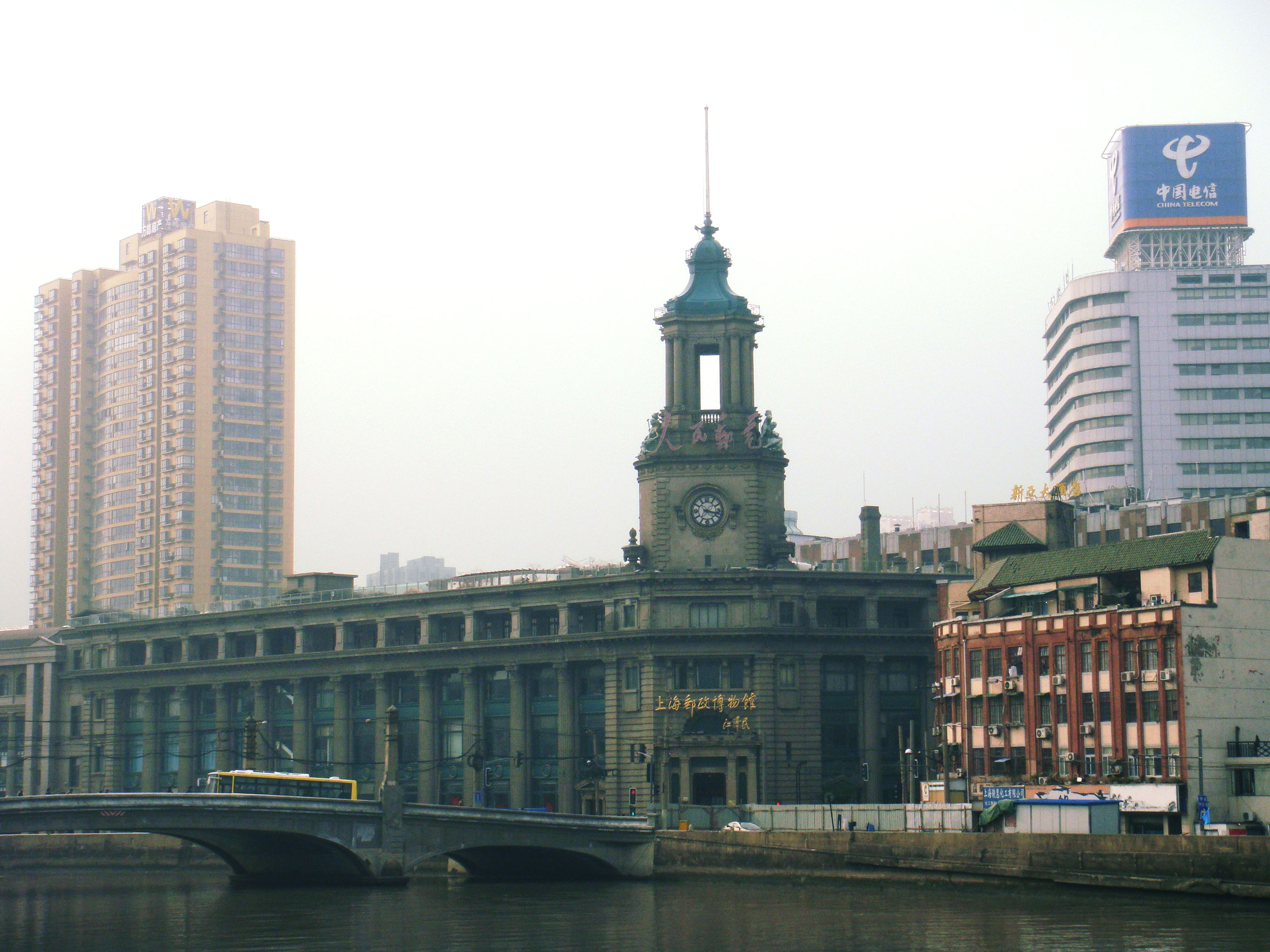
Shanghai Postal Museum at the General Post Office Building in Shanghai, China

- China National Postal and Stamp Museum
- Shanghai Postal Museum

==== Hong Kong ====
- The Postal Gallery

==== India ====
- National Philatelic Museum
- Postal Museum (Kolkata)
- Postal Museum (Mysore)
- Sandesh Museum of Communication, Bangalore

==== Indonesia ====
- Indonesian Stamp Museum

==== Israel ====
- Alexander Museum of Postal History and Philately

==== Japan ====
- Communications Museum of Japan – Ote-machi, Chiyoda-ku, Tokyo
- Postal Museum Japan
- Philatelic Culture Museum (Arima, Kobe)
- Philatelic Museum (Mejiro, Tokyo)

==== Malaysia ====
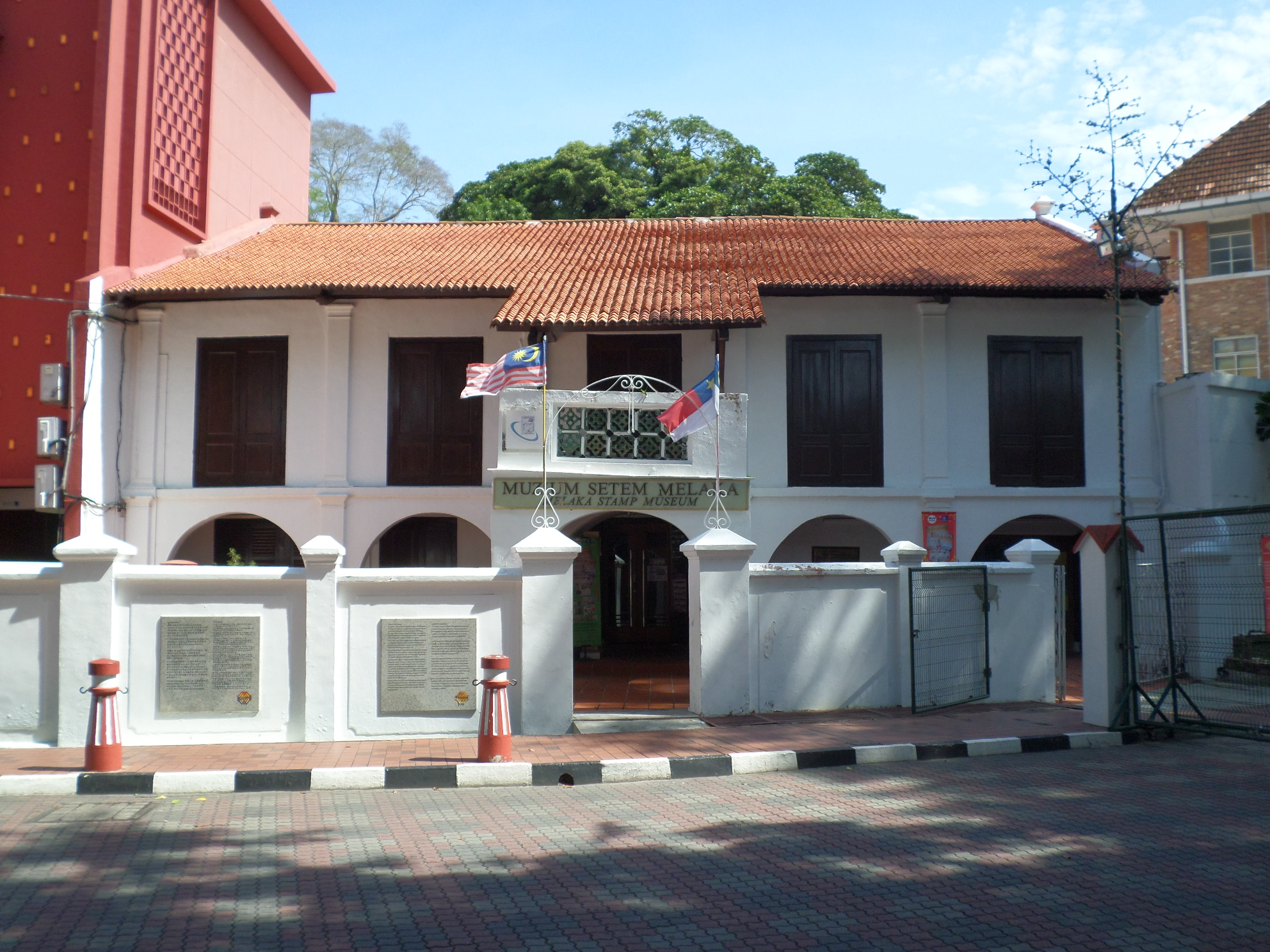
The Malacca Stamp Museum in Malacca City, Malaysia

- Malacca Stamp Museum

==== North Korea ====
- Korea Stamp Museum

==== Pakistan ====
- Pakistan Postal Museum – Karachi
- Siddiqui Philatelic Museum, 22-J-Z Madina Town, Faisalabad

==== Saudi Arabia ====
- The Postal Museum, Riyadh

==== Singapore ====
- Singapore Philatelic Museum

==== South Korea ====
- Damyang Stamp Museum
- Postal Museum, Cheonan, Chungcheongnam-do
- Korea Postage Stamp Museum, Jung-gu, Seoul

==== Sri Lanka ====
- Postal museum

==== Taiwan ====
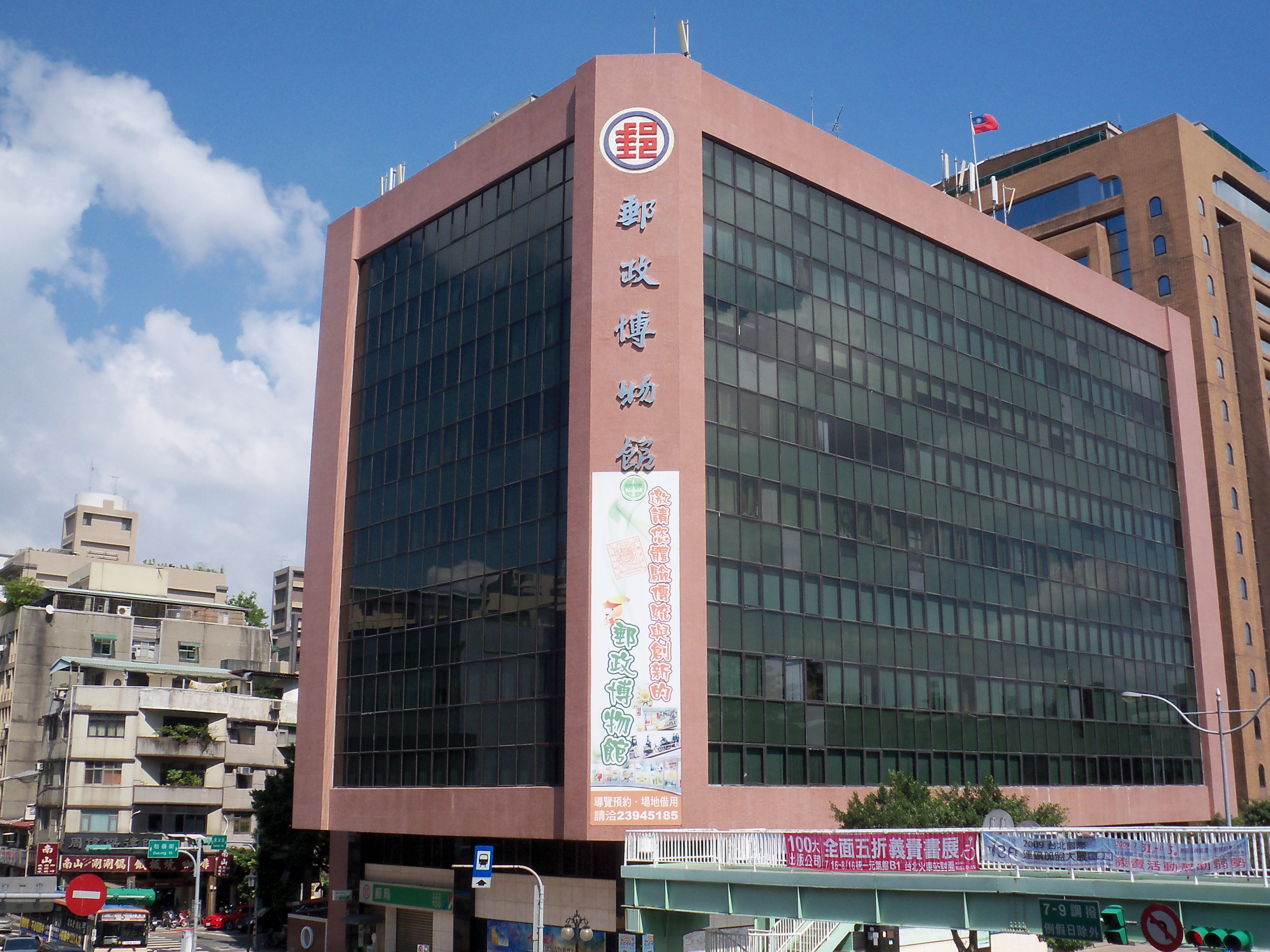
The Postal Museum in Taipei, Taiwan

- Chunghwa Postal Museum

==== Thailand ====
- Sam Sen Nai Philatelic Museum, Phaya Thai District, Bangkok, Thailand
- Chiang Mai Philatelic Museum, Chiang Mai, Thailand

==== United Arab Emirates ====
- Emirates Postal Museum

==== Uzbekistan ====
- The Museum of Communication History in Uzbekistan

=== Europe ===
==== Andorra ====
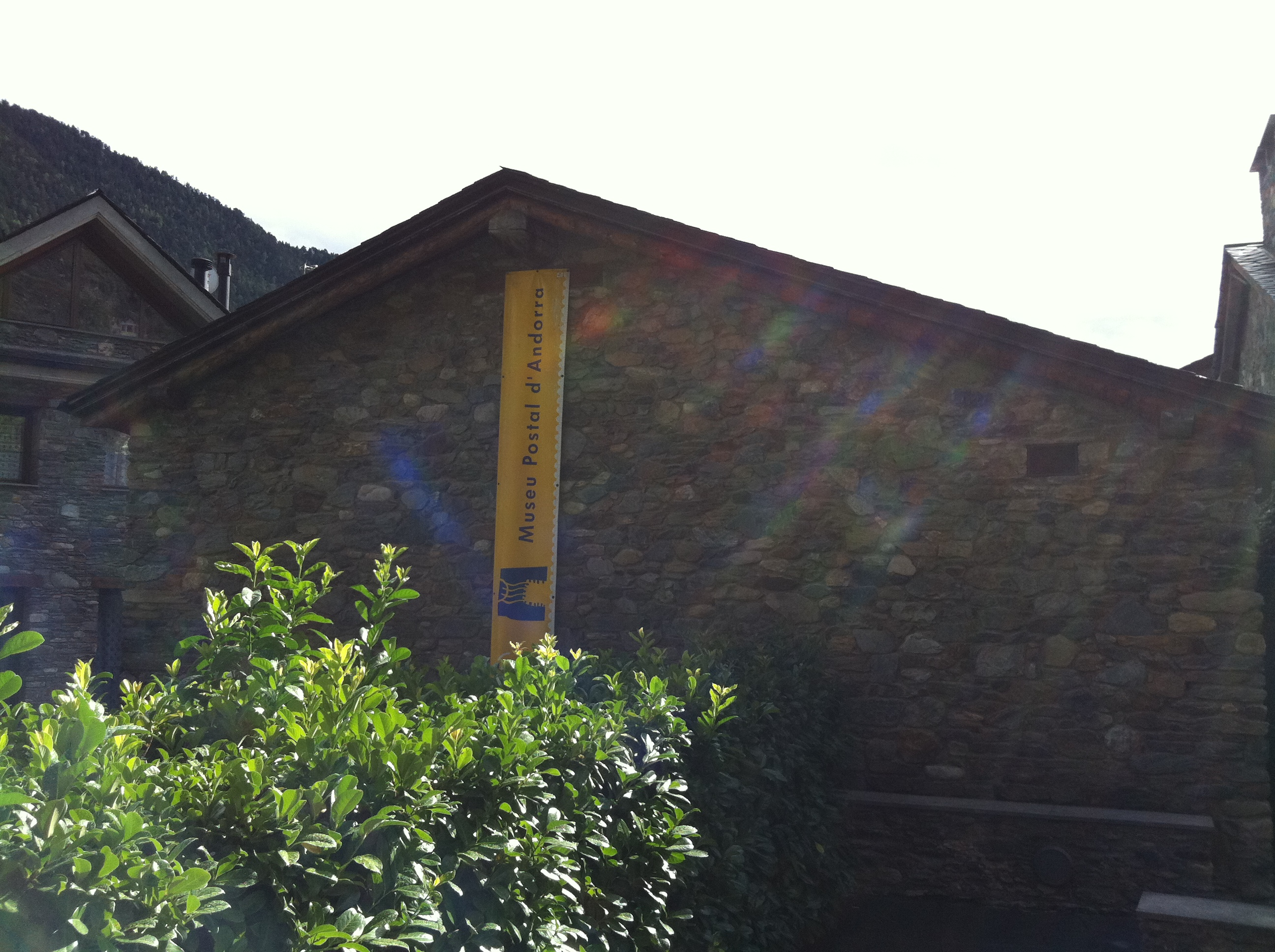
Museu Postal d'Andorra in Andorra

- Museu Postal d'Andorra

==== Austria ====
- Historisches Postamt Küb

==== Belgium ====
- Postal Museum of Belgium

==== Croatia ====
- Croatian Postal and Telecommunications Service Museum, Jurisiceva 13, HR–10 001 Zagreb, Croatia

==== Cyprus ====
- Cyprus Postal Museum

==== Czech Republic ====
- Prague Postal Museum

==== Denmark ====
- Danish Post & Tele Museum, Copenhagen
- Post and Telegraph History Museum, Århus

==== Estonia ====
- ENM Postal Museum – , Muuseumi tee 2, 60532 Tartu, Estonia

==== Finland ====
- Postimuseo

==== France ====
- Musée de La Poste

==== Germany ====
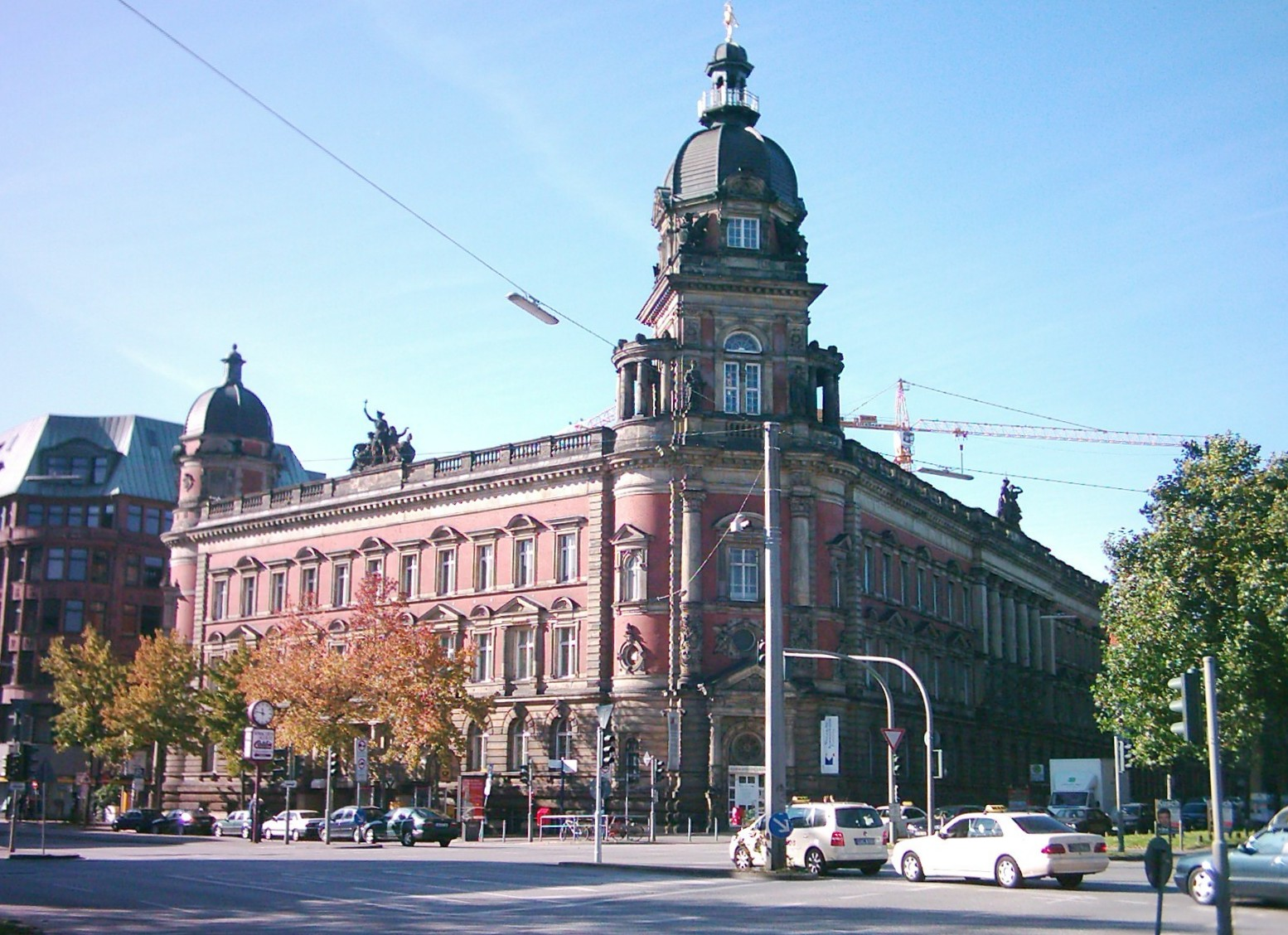
Museum für Kommunikation in Hamburg, Germany

- Iserlohner Museum für Handwerk und Postgeschichte
- Museum für Kommunikation Berlin
- Museum für Kommunikation Frankfurt
- Museum für Kommunikation Hamburg
- Museum of Communication, Nuremberg, Germany
- Philatelic Archive in Bonn
- Postmuseum Rheinhessen

==== Greece ====
- Postal & Philatelic Museum of Greece

==== Hungary ====
- Postal Museum of Hungary

==== Ireland ====
- An Post Museum (closed)

==== Italy ====
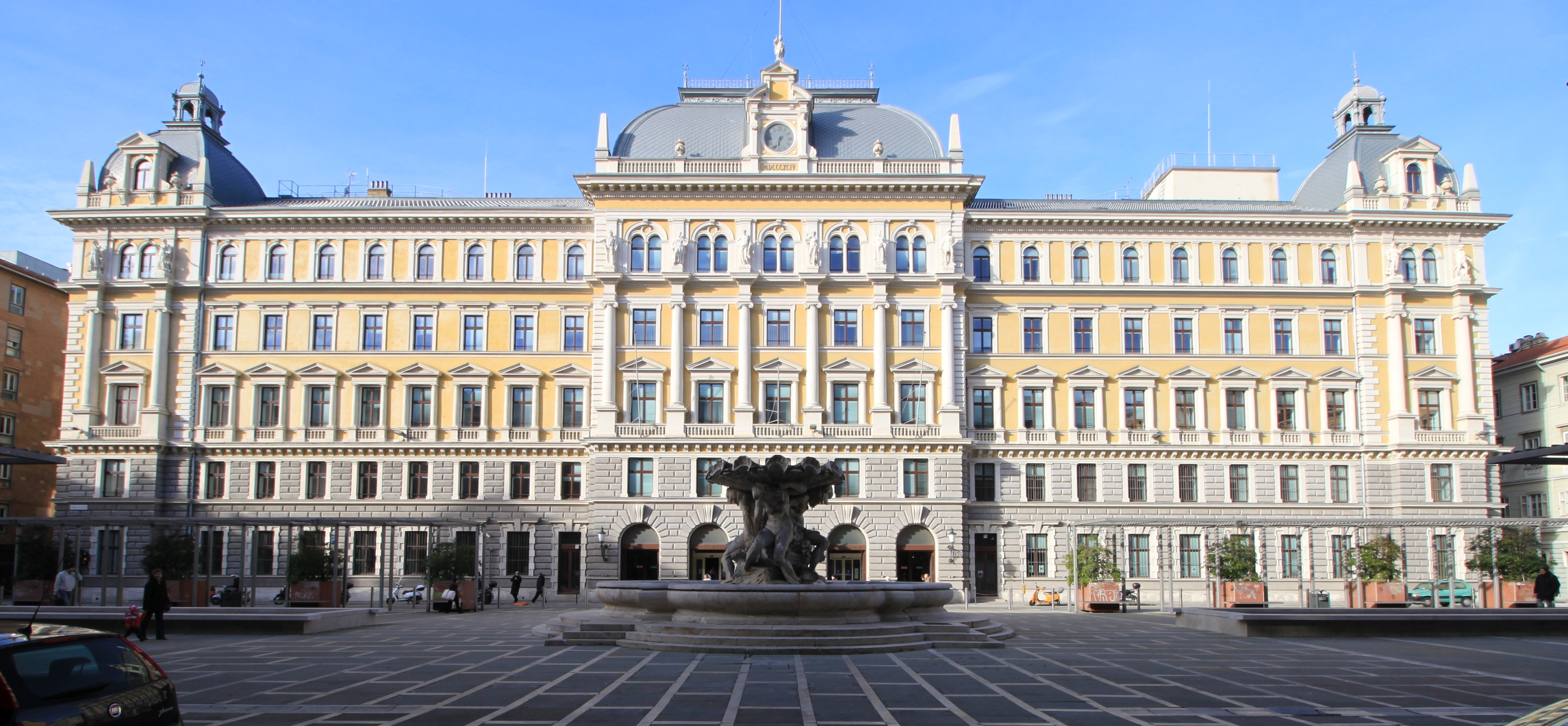
The Postal and Telegraphic Museum of Central Europe in Trieste, Italy

- Museo internazionale dell'immagine postale
- Museo storico della comunicazione
- Museum of Tasso family and Postal History, Camerata Cornello (Bergamo)
- Postal and Telegraphic Museum of Central Europe

==== Liechtenstein ====
- Postal Museum

==== Luxembourg ====
- PostMusée

==== Malta ====
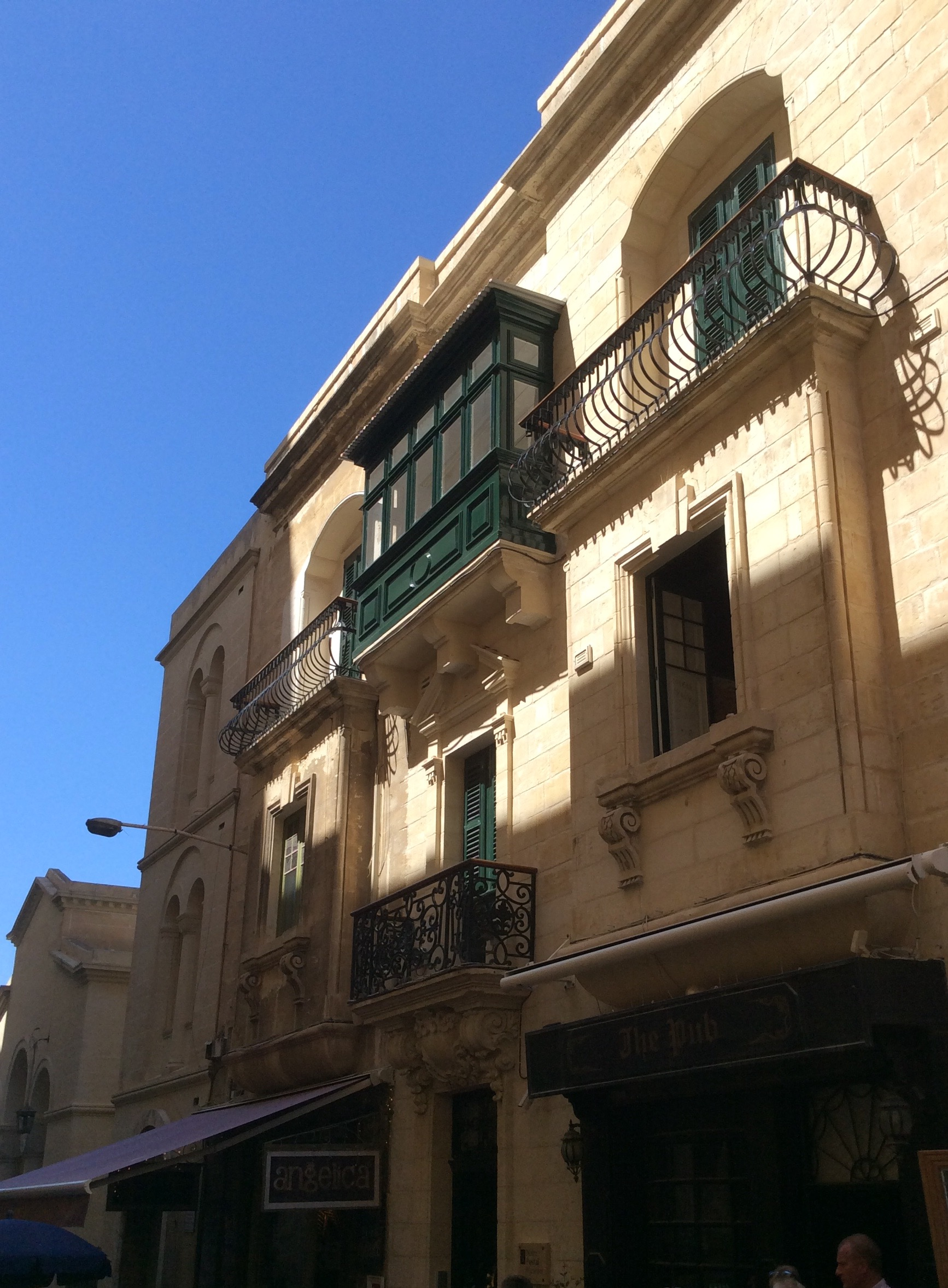
The Malta Postal Museum in Valletta, Malta

- Malta Postal Museum

==== Monaco ====
- Museum of Stamps and Coins

==== Netherlands ====
- Museum voor Communicatie

==== Poland ====
- Muzeum Poczty i Telekomunikacji we Wrocławiu

==== Russia ====
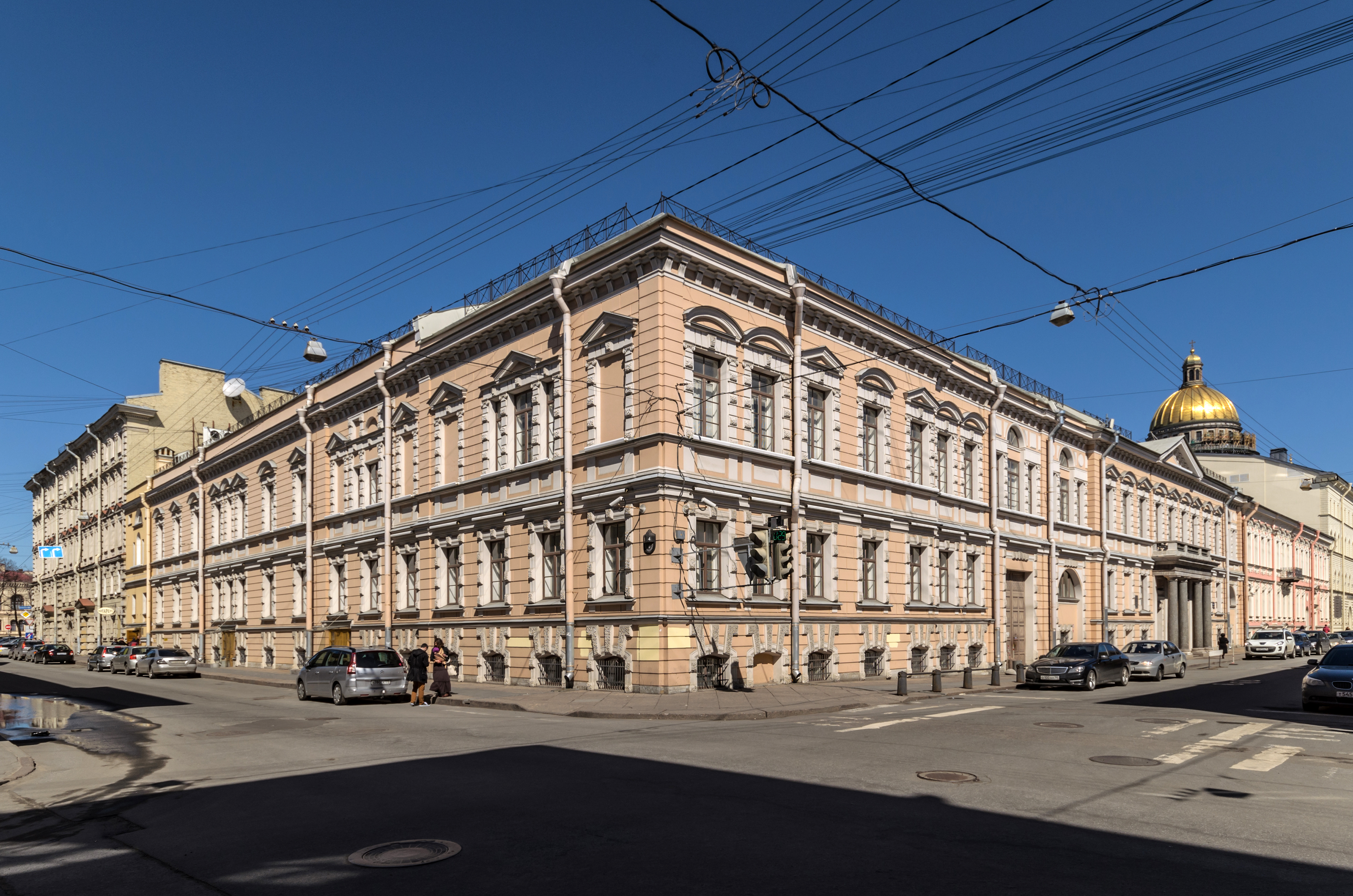
A.S. Popov Central Museum of Communications in Saint Petersburg, Russia

- A.S. Popov Central Museum of Communications

==== San Marino ====
- Museo del Francobollo e della Moneta

==== Slovenia ====
- Museum of Post and Telecommunications

==== Spain ====
- Postal and Telegraphic Museum of Spain
- La Virreina Centro de la Imagen

==== Sweden ====
- Postmuseum

==== Switzerland ====
- Museum of Communication Bern

==== Turkey ====
- Istanbul Postal Museum
- PTT Postage Stamp Museum

==== Ukraine ====
- Lviv Postal Museum
- Post Station in Nizhyn

==== United Kingdom ====
- Bath Postal Museum
- British Library Philatelic Collections
- Colne Valley Postal Museum
- Isle of Wight Postal Museum
- Oakham Treasures, Gordano, Avon housing the former collection held at Inkpen Postal Museum
- The Museum of Philatelic History at The Royal Philatelic Society London
- The Postal Museum, London

== See also ==
- Mail
