= Mauritius Postal Museum =

Museum in Port Louis, Mauritius

Coordinates: 20°09′36″S 57°30′06″E

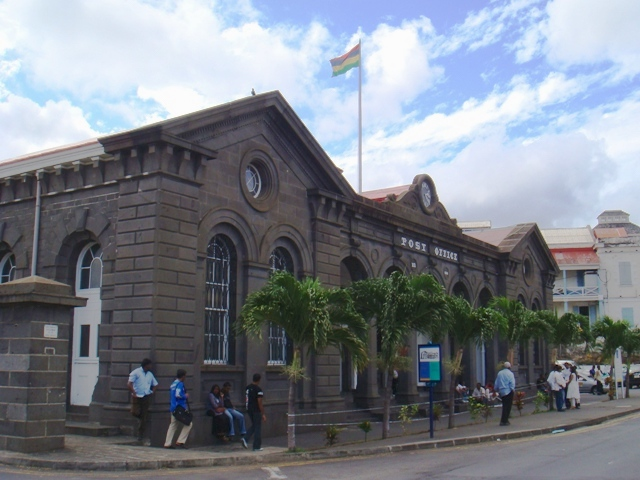
- Type: Postal Museum
- Website: www.mauritiuspost.mu/philately/postal-museum

The Mauritius Postal Museum is the Postal museum in Port Louis, the capital city of Mauritius.

== The building ==
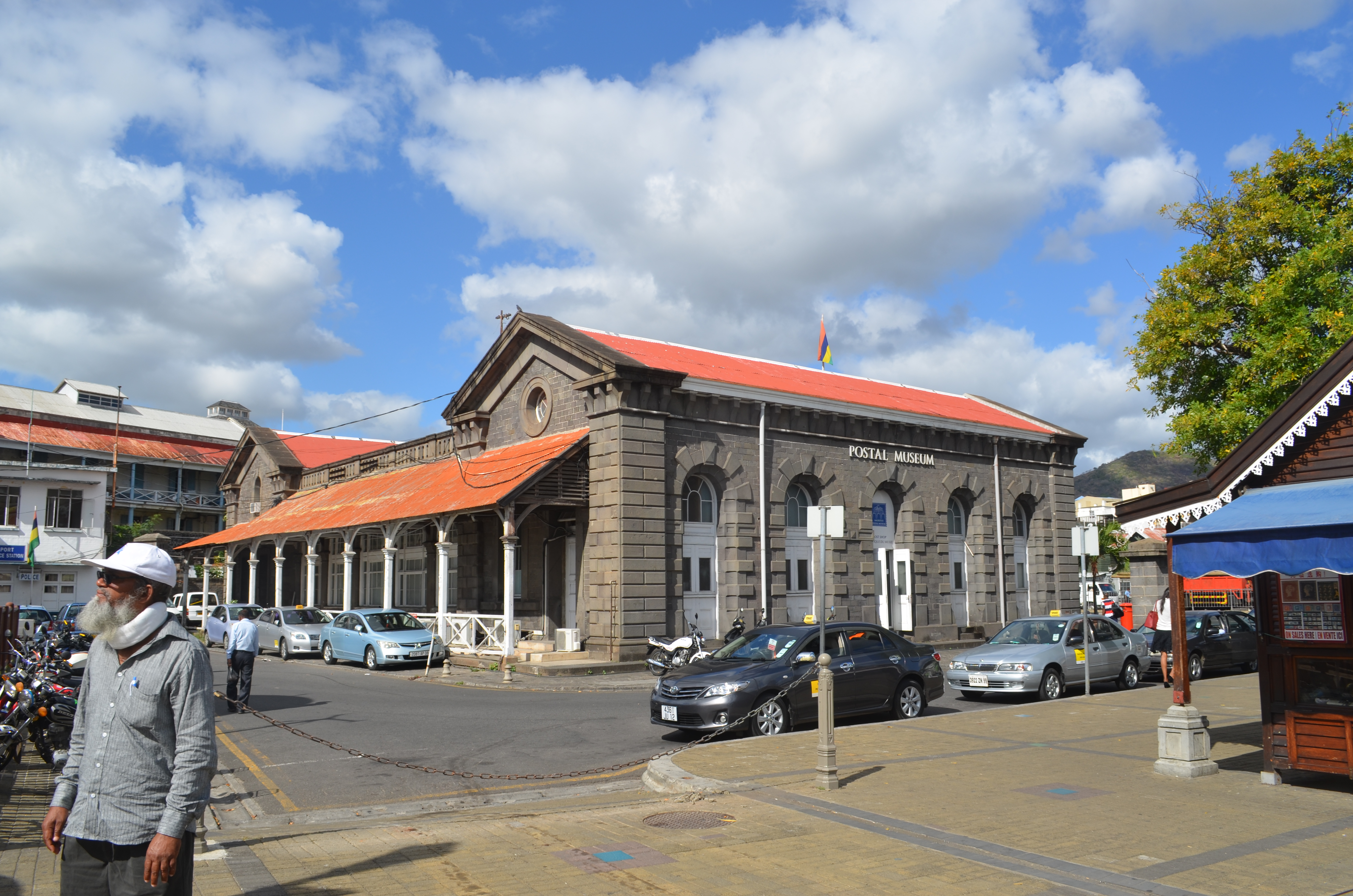
Rear of building

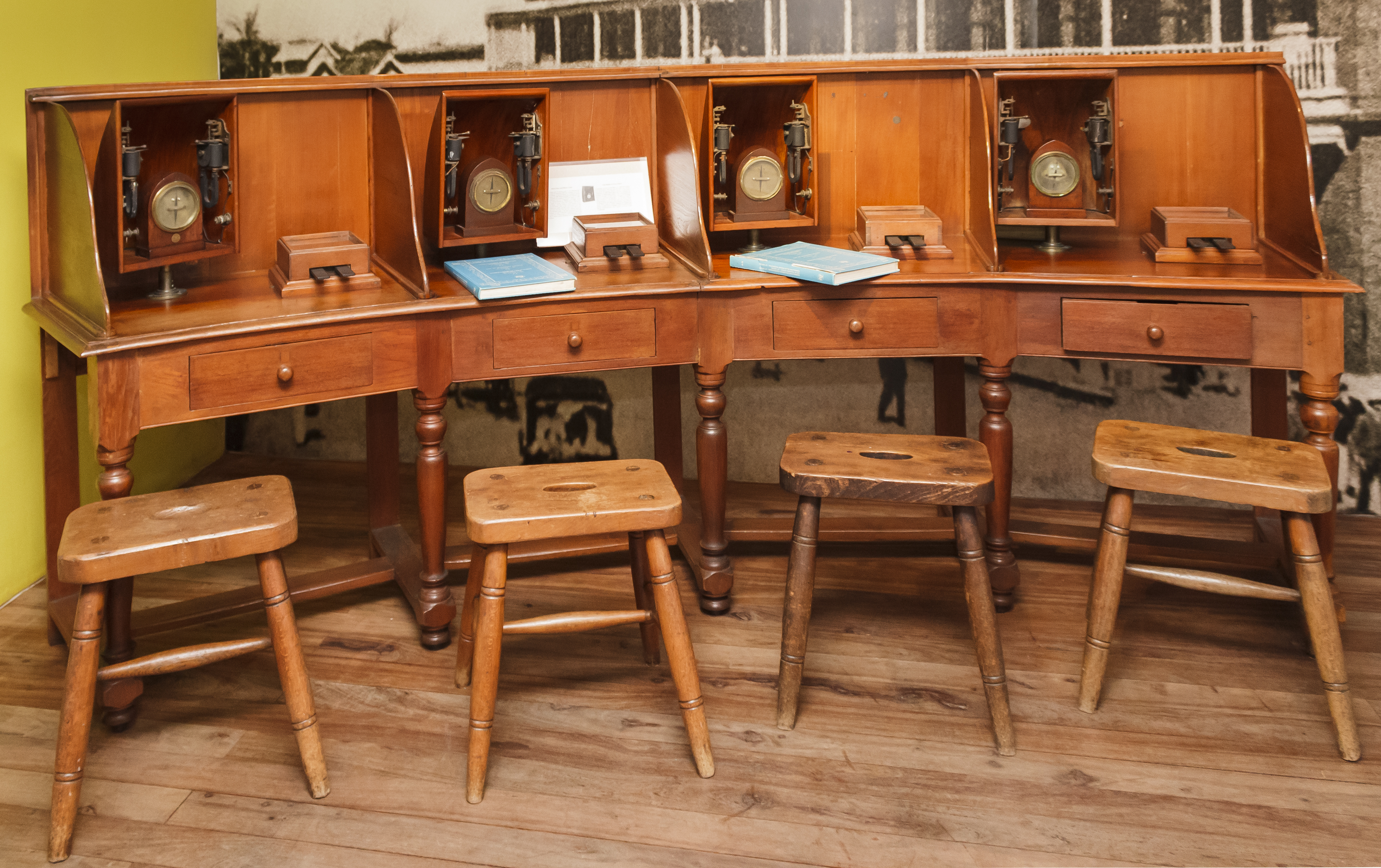
Telegraphy station

The building of today's museum was built as the General Post Office between 1865 and 1870. It is located at the harbour, beside the customs building in the center of the city.

In January 1865 construction started under the supervision of surveyor general Morrison and by 1868 three-quarters of the building was complete and it took another two years to complete the building project. The construction cost between £10,000 and £11,000 and employed about 80 workers. It was officially opened in December 1870.

The building is a good example of Victorian architecture of public colonial buildings during the reign of Queen Victoria, that are still present in such countries as, India, Sri Lanka, South Africa, Trinidad and Guyana.

It was a replacement for the previous General Post Office then located in Government Street near Government House, where the post office had been headquartered since 1847.

Since 21 December 1870, this became the main post office of Mauritius and in April 1877, the Central Telegraph Office also moved into the building.

The Postmaster General had his residence in the building. The mail from the 33 rural post offices of the island, that were built in the 1870s and 1890s, arrived here.

In 1958, under the British Governor-general Sir Robert Scott, this became a listed building enacted under Government Notice No. 614. This was preceded by a recommendation from the Ancient Monuments Board. The Mauritian National Monuments Act of 1985 confirmed the building's protected status, as did the "National Monuments of Mauritius" annex to the National Heritage Fund Act (Act No. 40) of 2003.

== Museum ==
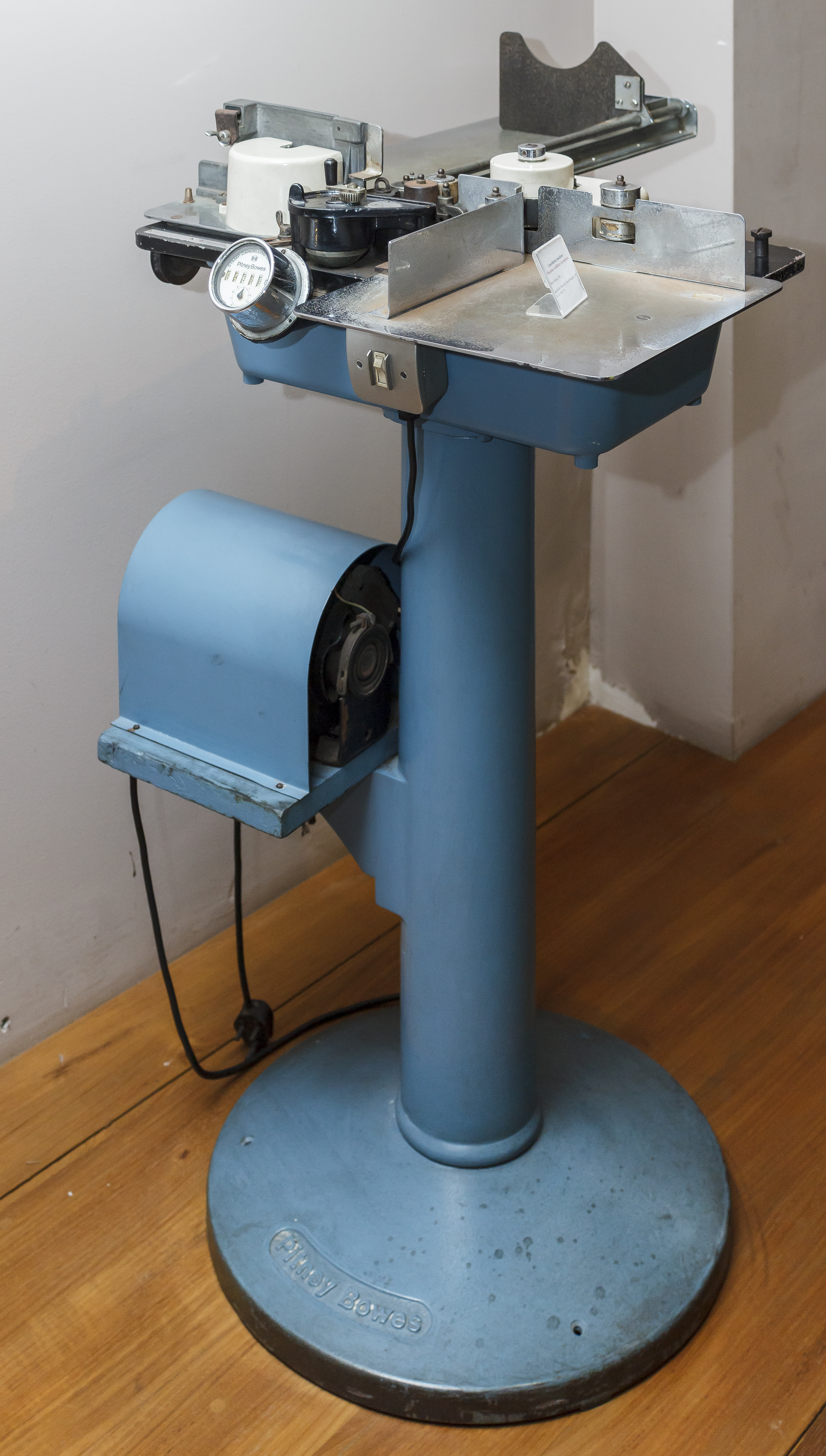
Pitney-Bowes cancelling machine

The postal museum, opened in 2001, displays exhibits on the island's postal and telecommunications history. However, the world-famous Red and Blue "Post Office" Mauritius stamps are not exhibited here, but in the nearby Blue Penny Museum.

== See also ==
- Smithsonian National Postal Museum

== Sources ==
- Mauritius Institute, Ministry of Education, Arts and Culture (Hrsg.): National Monuments of Mauritius, Volume 1: Port-Louis District. Éditions de l'Océan Indien, Port Louis, 1988, S. 4
