= LGBTQ rights in Mauritius =

- Mauritius
- Legal status: Legal since 2023
- Gender identity: No
- Discrimination protections: Sexual orientation protections by statute since 2008 and by constitution since 2023

Family rights
- Recognition of relationships: No
- Adoption: No

Lesbian, gay, bisexual, transgender, and queer (LGBTQ) rights in Mauritius have expanded in the 21st century, although LGBTQ Mauritians may still face legal difficulties not experienced by non-LGBTQ residents. Prior to 2023, sodomy (opposite-sex and same-sex anal and oral sex) was criminalized by Section 250 of the Criminal Code. However, the Supreme Court of Mauritius fully decriminalized homosexuality in October 2023. Although same-sex marriage is not recognized in Mauritius, LGBTQ people are broadly protected from discrimination in areas such as employment and the provision of goods and services, making it one of the few African countries to have such protections for LGBTQ people. The Constitution of Mauritius guarantees the right of individuals to a private life.

Mauritius is one of the 96 countries to have signed the "Joint Statement on Ending Acts of Violence Related Human Rights Violations Based on Sexual Orientation and Gender Identity" at the United Nations, condemning violence and discrimination against LGBTQ people. Furthermore, in recent years, there has been a growing acceptance towards LGBTQ people among Mauritius' population, particularly the younger generation, with polls indicating that it is one of Africa's most LGBTQ-friendly countries. Nevertheless, conservative attitudes about LGBTQ people are still commonplace.

== Legality of same-sex sexual activity ==
On 4 October 2023, the Supreme Court of Mauritius struck down the colonial-era law criminalizing same-sex sexual activity between consenting adults, ruling it unconstitutional. Same-sex intercourse between women was never illegal.

Previously, Section 250(1) of the Mauritius Criminal Code of 1838 held that "Any person who is guilty of the crime of sodomy ... shall be liable to penal servitude for a term not exceeding 5 years." Under the Supreme Court's 2023 judgement, the section should "re read so as to exclude such consensual acts from [its] ambit."

In 2007, the Law Reform Commission recommended that sodomy be decriminalised and that Section 250 be repealed. Former Attorney General Rama Valayden sought to pass a bill, which would have decriminalised consensual same-sex sexual relationships, but the bill did not go through. Prosecutions under the law were rare. In 2015, however, a same-sex couple was arrested on the suspicion they were practising sodomy.

In 2017, the Mauritius Government said it would not repeal Section 250, stating that it would address the issue after further consideration. In October 2019, Abdool Ridwan Firaas Ah Seek, a 29-year-old LGBTQ rights activist, filed a case against Section 250 at the Supreme Court with the support of Collectif Arc-En-Ciel, the oldest LGBTQ NGO in the country. The plaintiff is represented by a legal team composed of Mr Gavin Glover SC and Ms Yanilla Moonshiram, barristers-at-law, and Ms Komadhi Mardemootoo, attorney-at-law. A first hearing occurred in November 2019. Director Aschwin Ramenah of the Collectif Arc-En-Ciel has said:

Section 250 is like the sword of Damocles hanging over the lives of LGBT Mauritians. The time has come to repeal this discriminatory law that unfairly targets members of our society simply because of who they love. ... The way in which adults lead their lives in close, consensual relationships in the privacy of their own homes should never be a matter for state interference. Archaic laws like Section 250 have no place in our modern and democratic society.

In October 2019, another group of young Mauritians also filed a constitutional challenge on the basis that Section 250 "violates their fundamental rights and freedom". These plaintiffs are represented by Dentons (Mauritius) LLP and the Franco-Mauritian Law Chambers LCMB et Associés, and supported by the Young Queer Alliance and the Love Honor Cherish Foundation. A first hearing occurred on 21 November 2019, with a second on 18 February 2020. The defendants are Attorney General Maneesh Gobin, the Director of Public Prosecutions and the Commissioner of Police. On 12 June 2020, the plaintiffs were granted leave to apply to the Supreme Court for constitutional redress. The defendants withdrew their objection to the leave application.

== Recognition of same-sex relationships ==
Mauritius does not recognise same-sex marriage or civil unions.

In 2016, the Law Reform Commission was looking into a case to legalise same-sex marriage.

== Adoption and family planning ==
According to a 2006 report, both single individuals and married couples are eligible to adopt children in Mauritius. There are no explicit restrictions disqualifying LGBTQ persons from adopting. Similarly, the French Ministry of Foreign Affairs states that both single and married people may adopt, without specifying any disqualification based on sexual orientation.

== Discrimination protections ==
The 2023 Supreme Court decision decriminalizing sodomy held that the constitutional prohibition on discrimination based on "sex" was also inclusive of "sexual orientation."

The Equal Opportunities Act 2008 (French: Loi de 2008 sur l'égalité des chances) prohibits both direct and indirect discrimination based on sexual orientation in employment, education, accommodation, disposal of immovable property, provision of goods and services, companies and partnerships, registered associations and clubs, sports and access to premises, with "sexual orientation" being defined to mean "homosexuality (including lesbianism), bisexuality or heterosexuality". The act does not currently protect transgender people.

Sexual orientation discrimination in employment is also prohibited under the Workers' Rights Act and the Employment Relations Act.

== Transgender rights ==
Currently, transgender individuals in Mauritius are not permitted to legally change their gender markers on official documents, including passports, birth certificates, and national identity cards. However, a transgender person may be able to change their name through a court process. Gender-affirming care is available but limited. According to the government, hormone therapy for transgender people is provided in public hospitals.

Although transgender people continue to face social prejudice, recent reports suggest a gradual increase in societal acceptance, particularly toward transgender women. However, legal recognition and protection for transgender individuals remain limited.

== Intersex rights ==
Section 13(1)(1B) of the Civil Status Act states that: "Where the sex of a newborn cannot be determined due to congenital anomalies at the time of birth or stillbirth, the officer shall register the sex as “undetermined”. This legal provision, which considers newborns intersex, was added in 2021.

== Blood donation ==
In 2014, the Ministry of Health amended blood donation policy to allow men who have sex with men to donate blood. Anecdotally, LGBTQI persons have been prevented from donating blood on occasion.

== Living conditions ==
Mauritius is considered to be one of Africa's most LGBTQ-friendly countries, though LGBTQ people still face discrimination due to conservatives attitudes among the population. LGBTQ people may face discrimination, notably in public hospitals and bullying in schools.

AfriGay has reported that "whilst 'gay life' remains fairly quiet, mainly existing on the internet, in private and at the occasional party, the resorts are welcoming and non-discriminatory to all. For LGBTQ travelers there's little to worry about. No problems arising from LGBTQ couples sharing rooms during their holidays have been recorded."

=== Politics ===
Some politicians who have shown support for LGBTQ rights include former attorneys general Rama Valayden and Ravi Yerigadoo, former prime ministers Navin Ramgoolam and Paul Bérenger, MPs Joanna Bérenger and Tania Diolle, and former Minister of Public Service, Administrative and Institutional Reforms Alain Wong.

The Opposition already strongly supports the rights of homosexuals as human rights.

— Hon. Paul Bérenger, former Prime Minister and then Leader of the Opposition

Let us be clear. Everybody is equal. No-one has more rights than others and there should not citizens of first or second category. Therefore, we should all join hands and work together to ensure that there is no discrimination against anyone. Gender, sexual orientation, color, creed, social status and even handicaps should not be an obstacle.

— Hon. Alain Wong, then Minister of Public Service, Administrative and Institutional Reforms

=== LGBTQ Rights Organisations ===
In Mauritius, there are four organisations that work for the rights of the LGBTQ community: Collectif Arc-En-Ciel, Young Queer Alliance, Association VISA G and PILS.

Founded in 2005, Collectif Arc-En-Ciel ("Rainbow Collective") is the pioneer and main organisation for the LGBTQ community in Mauritius. The group organised the first Pride in Mauritius and has been doing so for the last fifteen years, gathering more than 1,200 participants in 2016. The organisation also fights against homophobia and discrimination based on sexual orientation and gender identity through numerous other campaigns. In 2016, the organisation moved the Pride march from a small town, Rose-Hill, to Port Louis, the capital. In 2018, religious extremists held a violent counter-march, and a strong police force was deployed to provide protection to the Pride marchers.

Founded on 1 September 2014, Young Queer Alliance is an organisation for the young LGBTQ community in Mauritius. The Young Queer Alliance engages in support, advocacy and campaigns against discrimination. Association VISA G is an organisation mainly for transgender individuals.

Founded in 1996, PILS (Prévention Information Lutte contre le Sida) is a centre for individuals with HIV/AIDS in the country, and also a place for the prevention and education of people living with HIV/AIDS.

In 2014, Moments.mu became the first travel agency in Mauritius to dedicate their services to the LGBTQ community.

In June 2018, the Pride march organised by Collectif Arc-En-Ciel was annulled because of hundreds of death threats believed to originate from religious extremists. In addition, a counter-protest against LGBTQ rights was organised by Javed Meetoo, a known Islamic extremist already under surveillance according to Mauritian authorities. Many important religious figures on the island, including Cardinal Maurice Piat, firmly condemned the protest against LGBTQ rights and called for respect and tolerance for all. An LGBTQ sit-in took place a few days later at the Caudan Waterfront in the capital, with the support of Prime Minister Pravind Jugnauth.

== Public opinion ==
A 2016 poll found that 49% of Mauritians would like or not mind having an LGBTQ neighbor.

== Summary table ==
Same-sex sexual activity legal	Yes (Since 2023)
Equal age of consent (16)	Yes (Since 2023)
Anti-discrimination laws in employment only	Yes (Since 2008 by statute and constitutionally since 2023; sexual orientation only)
Anti-discrimination laws in the provision of goods and services	Yes (Since 2008 by statute and constitutionally since 2023; sexual orientation only)
Anti-discrimination laws in all other areas (incl. indirect discrimination)	Yes (Since 2008 by statute and constitutionally since 2023; sexual orientation only)
Same-sex marriages	No
Recognition of same-sex couples	No
Stepchild adoption by same-sex couples	No
Joint adoption by same-sex couples	No
LGBTQ people allowed to serve openly in the military	Has no military (Note: Mauritius has no official standing army. Instead, they have 10,000 active duty personnel under the command of the Commissioner of Police. The 8,000-member National Police Force is responsible for domestic law enforcement. There is also a 1,500-member Special Mobile Force, and a 500-member National Coast Guard, which are both considered paramilitary units. Both units are equipped with small arms.)
Conversion therapy banned	Unclear
Right to change legal gender	No
Third option for intersex children on birth certificates	Yes (Since 2021)
Access to IVF for lesbian couples	No
Commercial surrogacy for gay male couples	No
MSMs allowed to donate blood	Yes (Generally since 2014)

== See also ==
- Human rights in Africa
- LGBTQ rights in Africa
