= Florida Postal Museum =

Postal museum in Orange City, Florida

- Founded: 1992
- Type: Not-for-profit 501 (C) (3)
- Location: Orange City, Florida, USA
- Origins: DeLand Postal Museum
- Method: Display of over 1,250 different historic postal items
- Key people: Richard Feinauer, President

The Florida Postal Museum is a museum dedicated the preserving the history of postal items, postal history, and postal service.

== History ==
The museum was founded in 1992 when Joe Guthrie, the Postmaster of DeLand, Florida, permitted the establishment of a small (6 foot by 10 foot) postal museum inside the post office. It was recognized by the U.S. Postal Service in 1996 as the DeLand Postal Museum. When the DeLand post office location was closed in June 1997, the museum moved to a historic building called the 1876 Heritage Inn. On February 25, 2000, its grand opening was held.

== Organization ==
Initially, after the DeLand move, the museum was called The U.S. Postal Service Museum. The name of the museum was changed to Florida Postal Museum which allowed the organization to seek grants and other such donated funds.

The Central Florida District of the postal service appointed Richard Feinauer as the Curator and Ms. Frank Saultz, the postmistress of Orange City, Florida, as the Contracting Officer in charge of the Museum.

== Exhibits ==
Current space in the museum allows approximately only 750 items of postal equipment and postal history to be displayed from an inventory of over 1,250 items. Some of the items are shown on the organization's website.

== See also ==
- U.S. postal museums
- Postal history
- Postal Museum
- Marshall, Michigan—second largest postal museum in U.S.
