= Malacca Stamp Museum =

Museum in Melaka Tengah, Malacca, Malaysia

- Muzium Setem Melaka
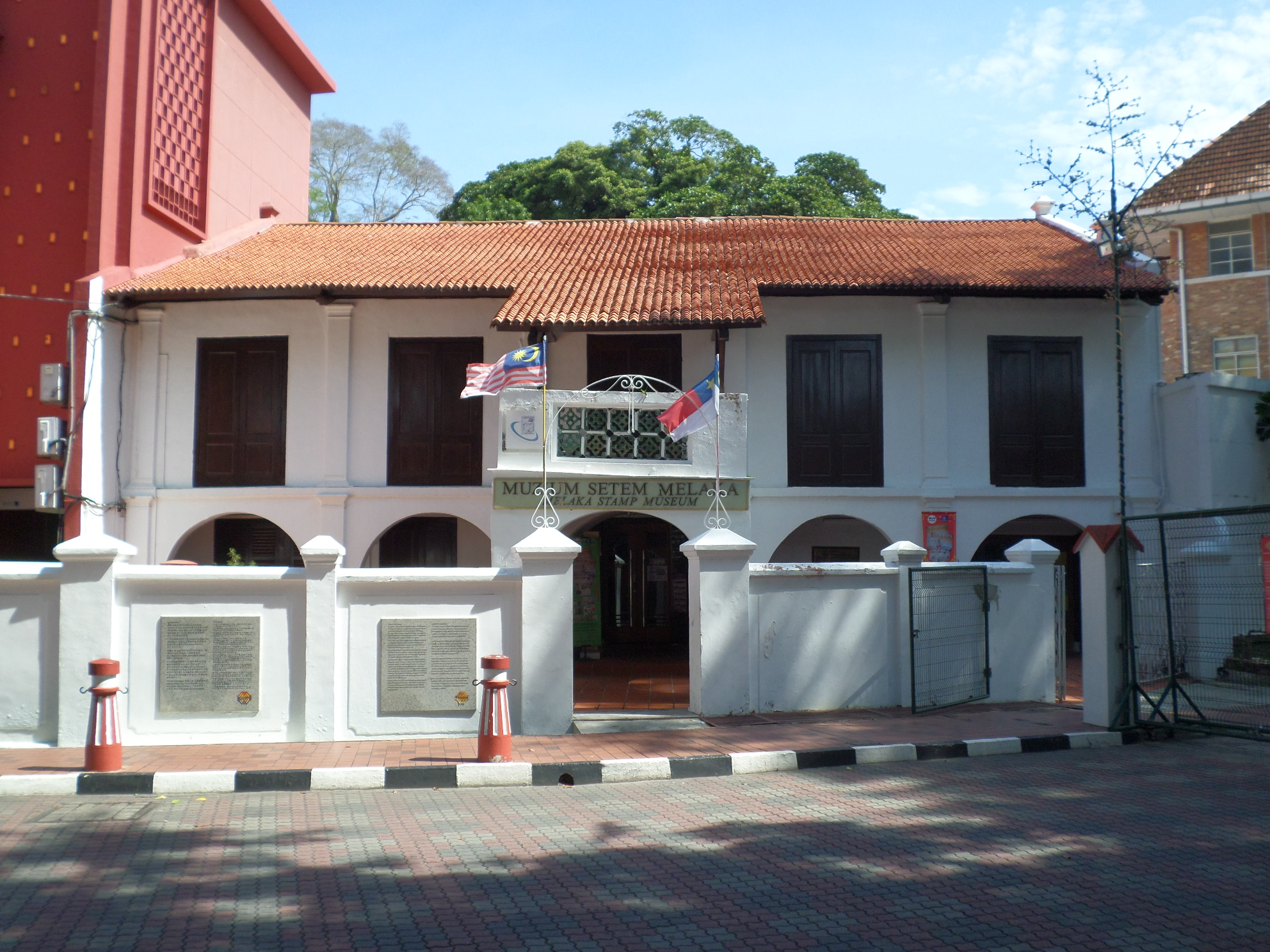
- Established: 2007
- Dissolved: 2023
- Location: Malacca City, Malacca, Malaysia
- Coordinates: 2°11′29.8″N 102°14′58.3″E
- Type: museum

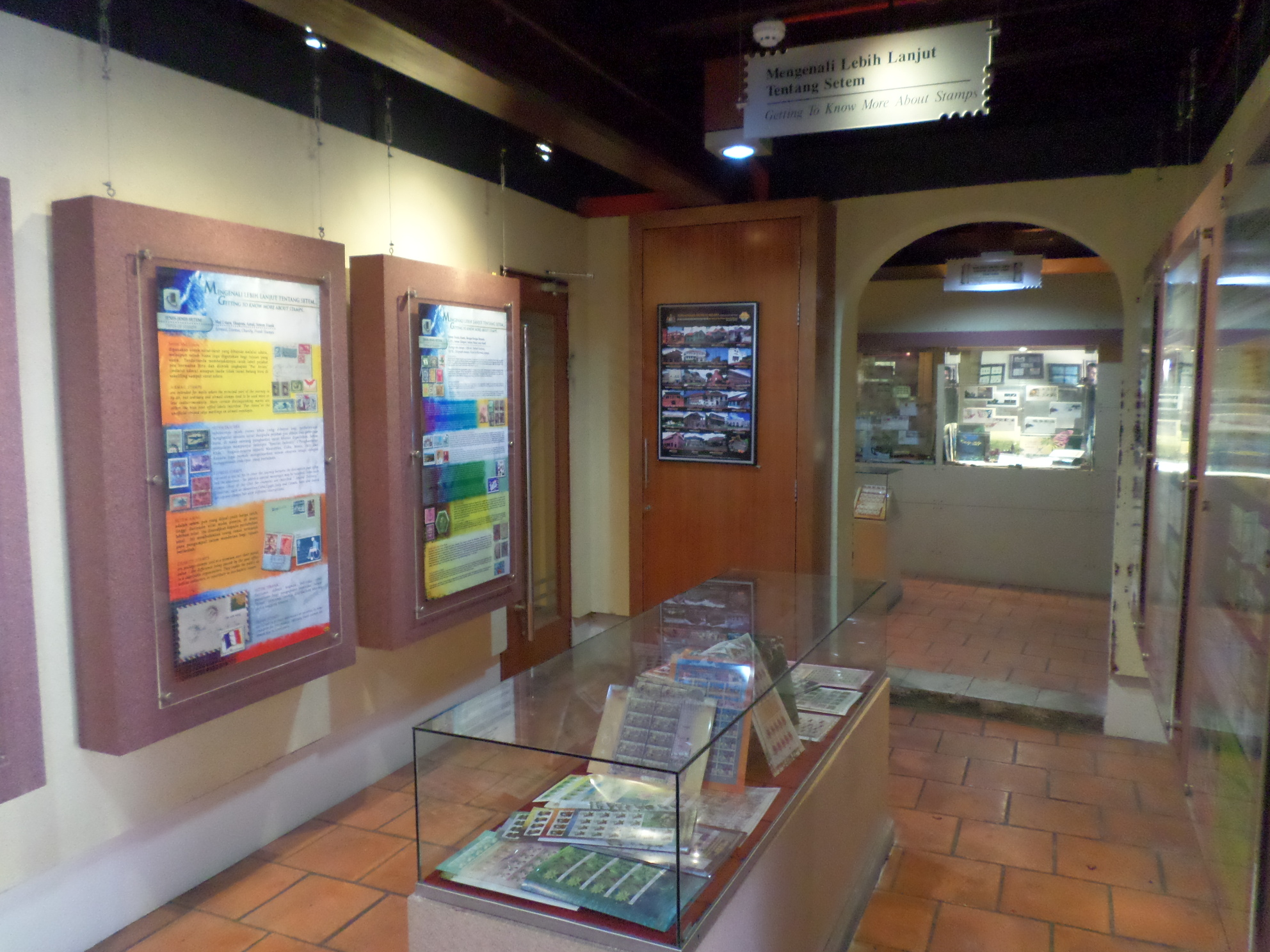
Museum exhibition hall

Malacca Stamp Museum (Malay: Muzium Setem Melaka) was a postal museum in Malacca City, Malacca, Malaysia. It was housed in a building that was constructed using local materials and has the shape and characteristics of western architecture.

The museum building was originally used as the residence for Dutch dignitaries living in Malacca until the end of World War II after which the building was abandoned. On 19 March 1954, G.E.W Wisdom, the British Resident Commissioner in Malacca, turned the building into the Malacca State Museum, until it was moved to Stadthuys in 1982. The building was also once occupied by the Malacca Islamic Foundation and the Enforcement Unit of the Malacca Municipal Council. In 2004, the building was restored by the Department of Museum and Antiquity and handed over to the Malacca State Government. In 2007, the state government, in cooperation with Pos Malaysia, decided to set up the Postal Museum in the building.

In 2023, the museum was replaced with a cafe.

== See also ==
- List of museums in Malaysia
- List of tourist attractions in Malacca
