= Malta Postal Museum =

- Mużew tal-Posta ta' Malta

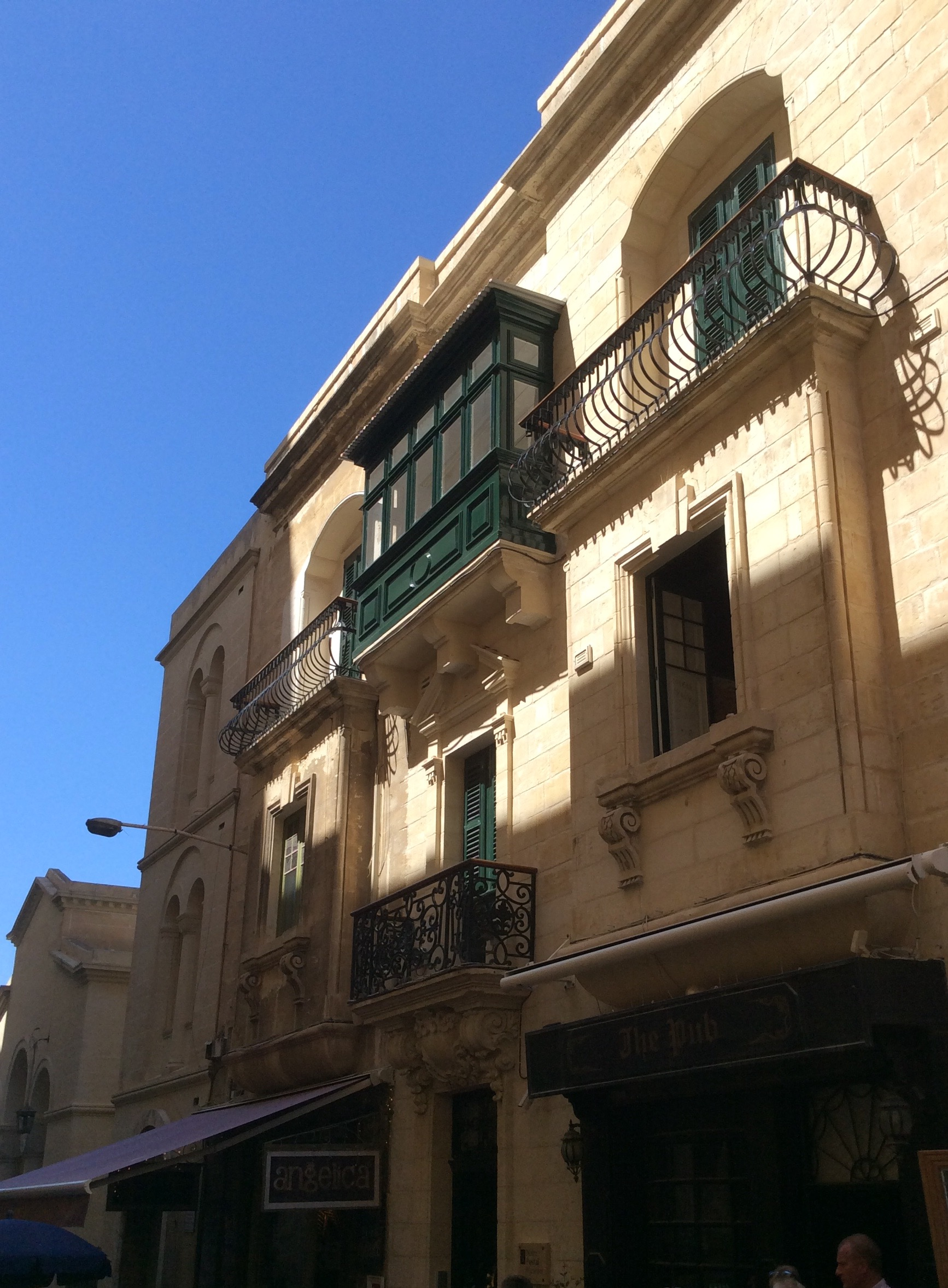
- Façade of the building housing the Malta Postal Museum
- Established: 17 June 2016
- Location: 135, Archbishop Street, Valletta, Malta, VLT 1444
- Coordinates: 35°53′55″N 14°30′53″E
- Type: Postal museum
- Curator: Lara Bugeja
- Owner: MaltaPost
- Website: www.maltapostalmuseum.com

The Malta Postal Museum (Maltese: Mużew tal-Posta ta' Malta) is a postal museum in Valletta, Malta. It is run by the postal operator MaltaPost, and it was inaugurated on 17 June 2016. The museum is housed in a restored 20th-century townhouse in the centre of Valletta, close to the Grandmaster's Palace and the Church of Our Lady of Damascus.

== History ==
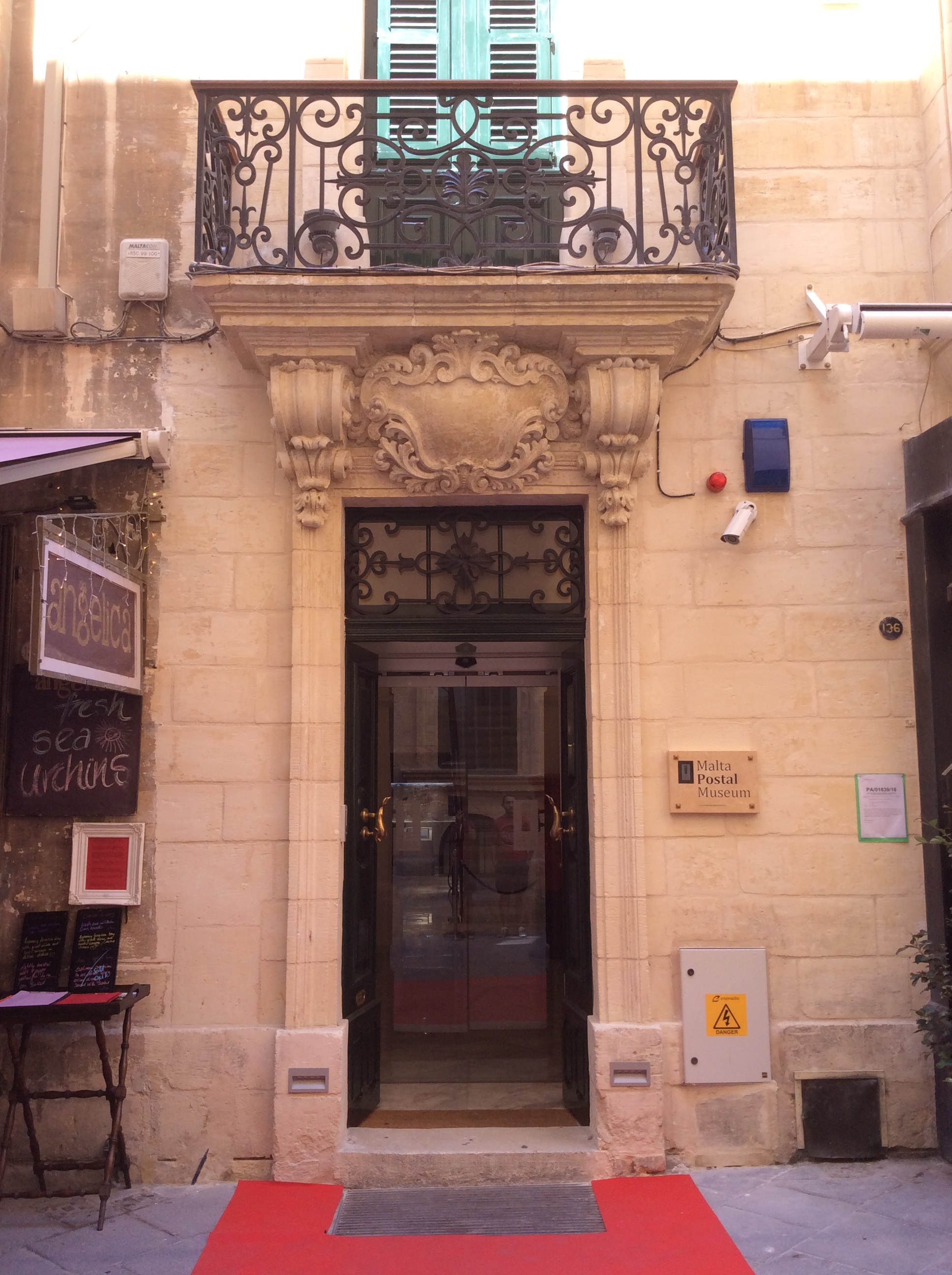
Main entrance of the museum

MaltaPost announced their intention to establish a postal museum in September 2010. The Malta Environment and Planning Authority (MEPA) approved the conversion of a townhouse at no. 135, Archbishop Street, Valletta, to accommodate the proposed museum in 2012. In 2014, the Postal Heritage Trust donated a Royal Mail van, a pillar box, a wall box and some postal uniforms to MaltaPost in order to exhibit them at the museum.

The museum was inaugurated by President Marie Louise Coleiro Preca on 17 June 2016, and it was opened to the public on 20 June. The museum is supported by funding from the European Regional Development Fund of the European Union.

A special postmark commemorating the opening of the museum was used at the Philatelic Bureau in Marsa on 17 June 2016.

== The building ==
The museum is housed in a restored building at no. 135, Archbishop Street, Valletta, next to Our Lady of Damascus Church. The site was originally occupied by a house belonging to the noblewoman Caterina Vitale (known for the Hospital of Incurable Woman - Casetta), and it was later passed to the Monte della Redenzione degli Schiavi. The building was destroyed by aerial bombardment during World War II in 1942.

The present building which houses the museum was built as a three-story townhouse in 1947, to designs of the architect Giuseppe Cachia Caruana (1894-1981). A fourth storey was constructed after MaltaPost acquired the building in 2011.

== Collection and display ==
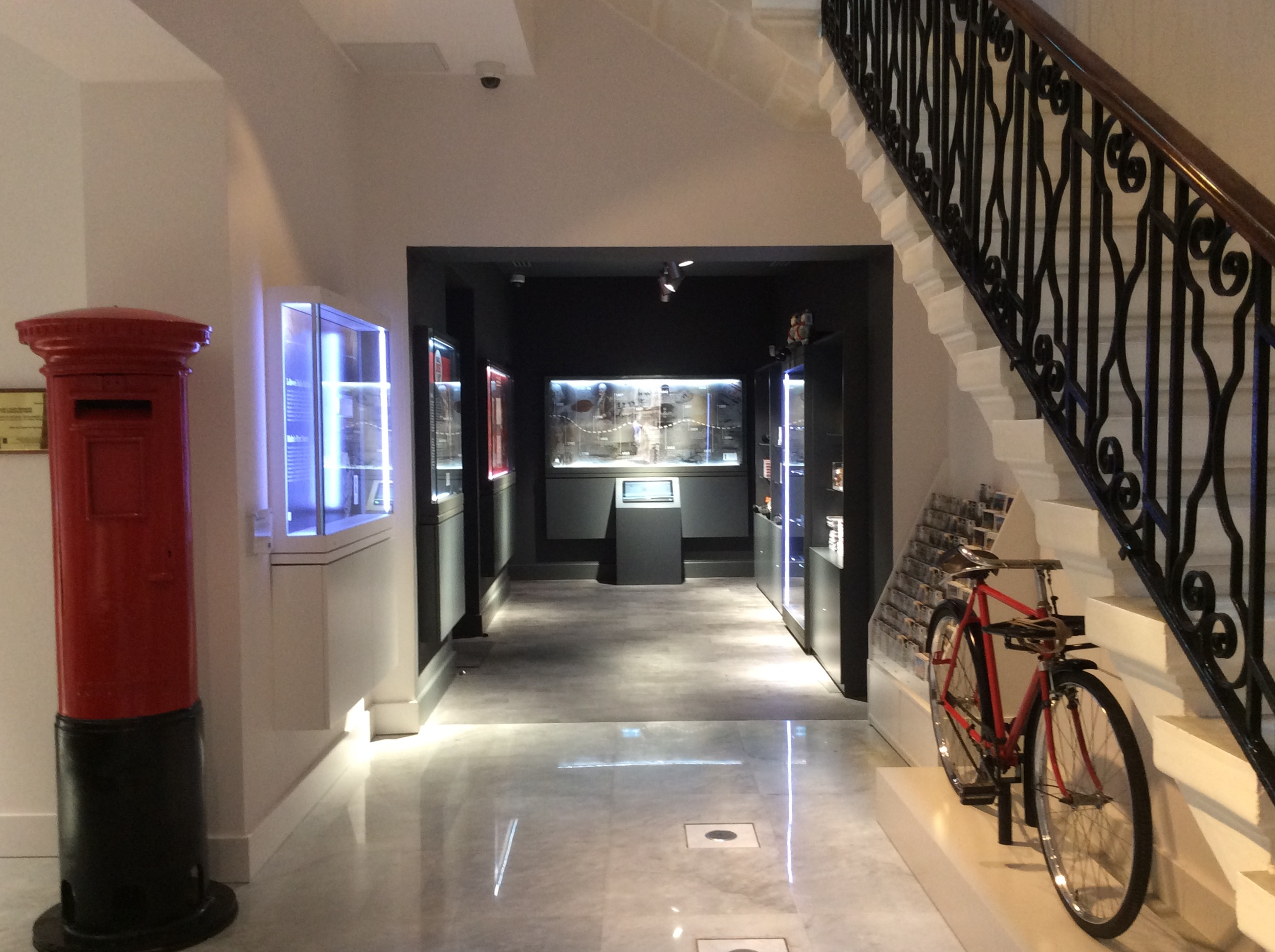
The museum's ground floor

The Malta Postal Museum's collection consists of documents and artifacts related to the postal history of Malta from the 16th century to the present day, along with every Maltese postage stamp issued from 1860 (the Halfpenny Yellow) to 2010. The collection is displayed so as to indicate the role played by the postal service at various points throughout Malta's history.

The museum includes a gift shop, a section dedicated to children, and two galleries for temporary exhibitions. The first exhibition included artworks by Emvin Cremona, Malta's most prominent stamp designer.

The museum is open to the public from Mondays to Saturdays.

== Gallery ==
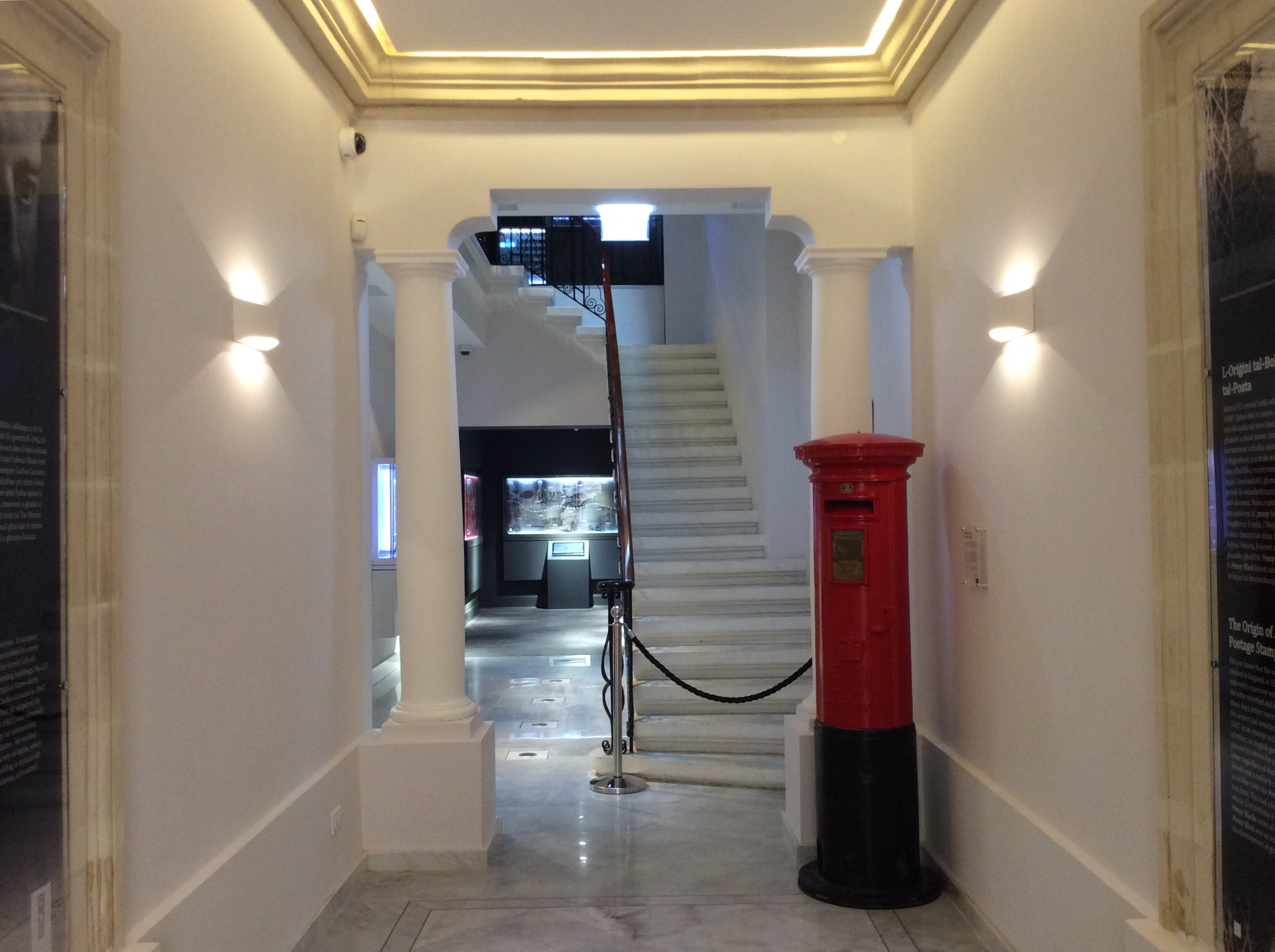
Entrance

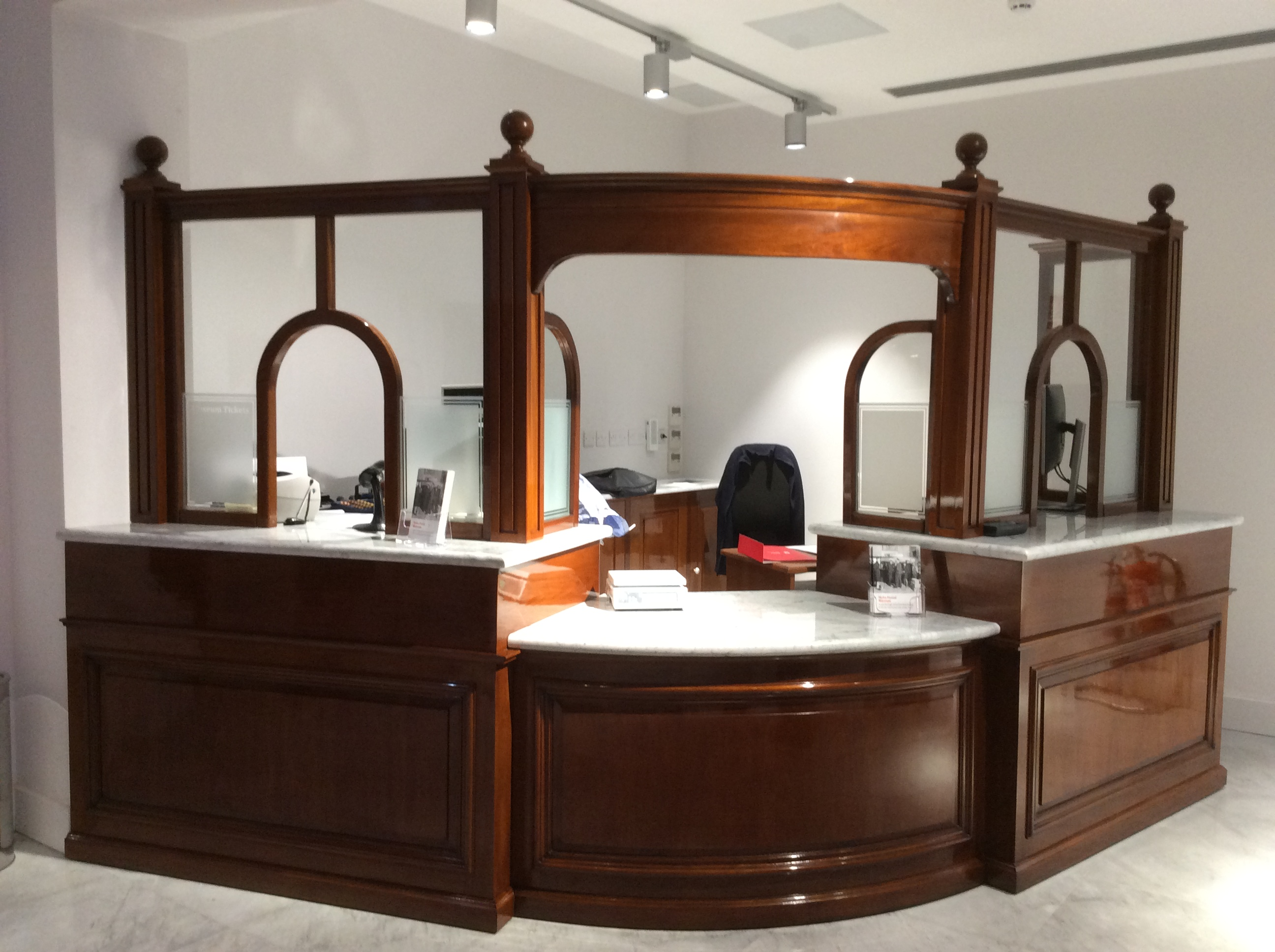
Reception area (replica of post office counter)

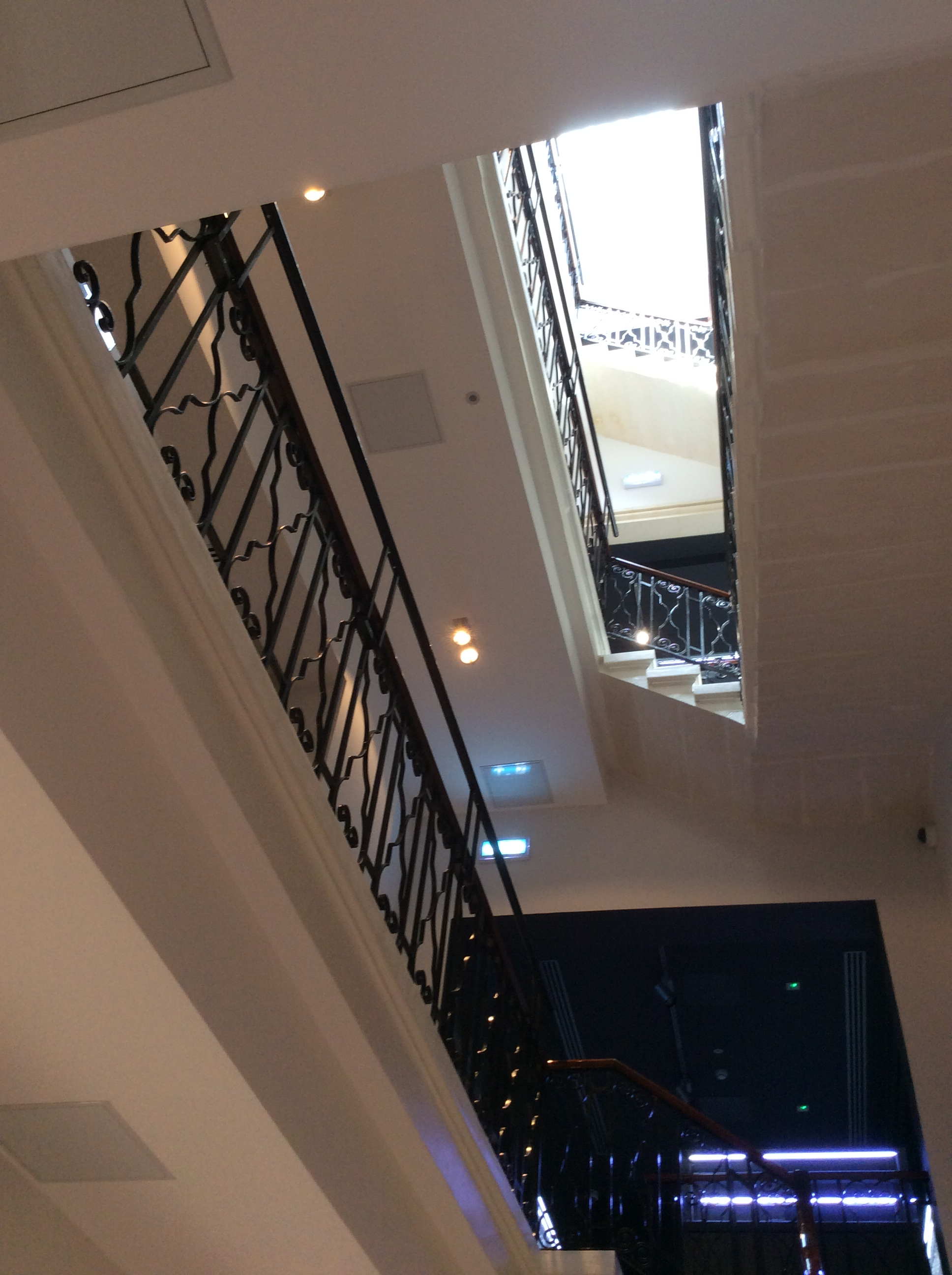
Stairs

== See also ==
- List of museums in Malta
