= Chiang Mai Philatelic Museum =

Postal museum in Chiang Mai, Thailand

Coordinates: 18°47′21″N 99°00′08″E

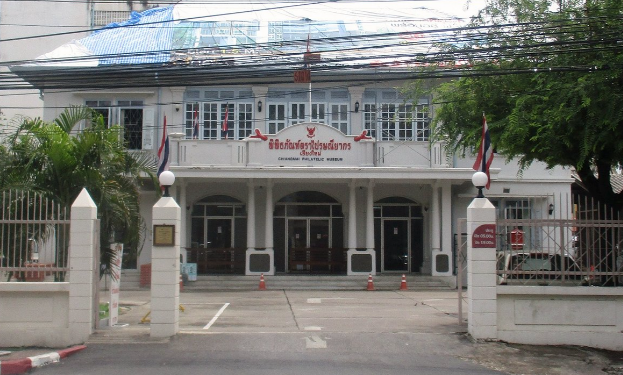
- Established: 1990
- Location: Praisanee Road, Chiang Mai, Thailand
- Type: Postal museum

Chiang Mai Philatelic Museum is a museum dedicated to the postal history of Thailand. It is located in Chiang Mai, on the left bank of the Ping River, and was opened in 1990.

== History ==
The museum is housed in a former post and telegraph office built in 1910, which was converted into a museum by the Communications Authority of Thailand in 1990.

The two-storey building has four exhibition rooms. On the ground floor is displayed old equipment used by the postal and telegraphic service, information about the history of the postal service, and old photographs of the post office. Outside is exhibited old post boxes. The first floor displays the stamp collection, including many of Thailand's stamp issues dating back to the first series of definitive stamps issued by Siam in 1883.

The building is listed by the Fine Arts Department as a registered monument.
