= Cyprus Postal Museum =

Postal museum in Cyprus

The Cyprus Postal Museum is a postal museum in Cyprus established in 1981.

The museum is located within the city walls of Nicosia in the ground floor an old mansion in the Laiki Geitonia area, and details the postal and philatelic history of Cyprus. Exhibits date from the 15th century onwards. Its primary purpose is to showcase the extensive and diverse postal history of the island.

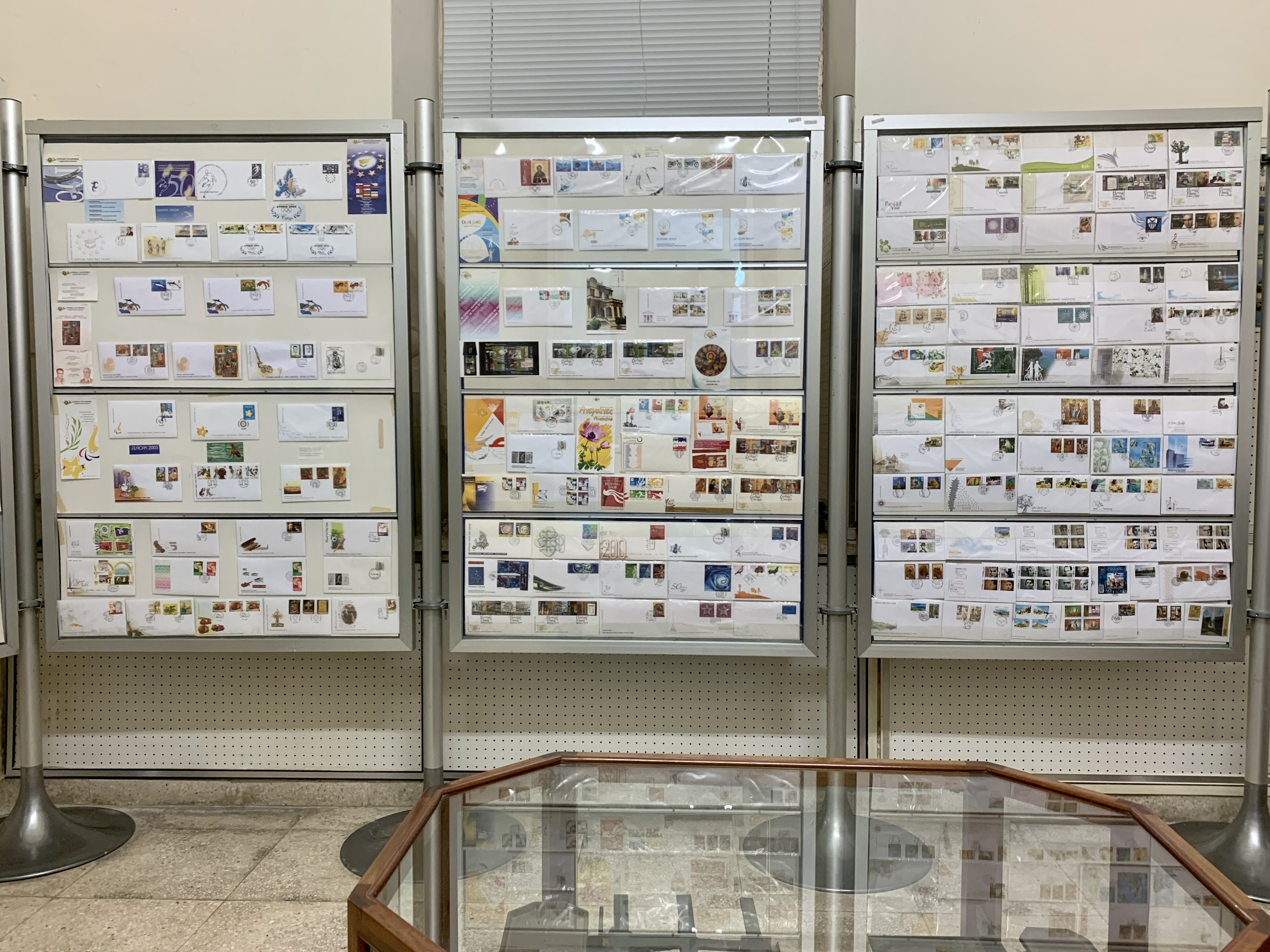
Cyprus Postal Museum

== Exhibits ==
The museum's halls present a chronological arrangement of postage stamps and a wealth of philatelic artifacts. The first artefacts date from the 15th century, when the Cypriot postal system was first organised during the Venetian period. Notably, it houses the oldest series of Cypriot stamps bearing the portrait of Queen Victoria of England, marked with the word 'Cyprus,' as well as the initial dedicated Cypriot series from 1928, depicting significant historical sites and figures related to the island's extensive heritage.

Among the other exhibits are envelopes and stamps issued on the inaugural days of their release since the establishment of the Republic of Cyprus in 1960 until the present day. These exhibits highlight the island's crucial historical events, prominent figures, cultural essence, tourist attractions, monuments, and overall contributions to civilization. Additionally, the museum showcases various methods of insuring post, ranging from traditional sealing-wax to advanced machinery, complemented by weighing scales and a collection of philatelic books and magazines.
