= GPO Museum =

Museum in Dublin

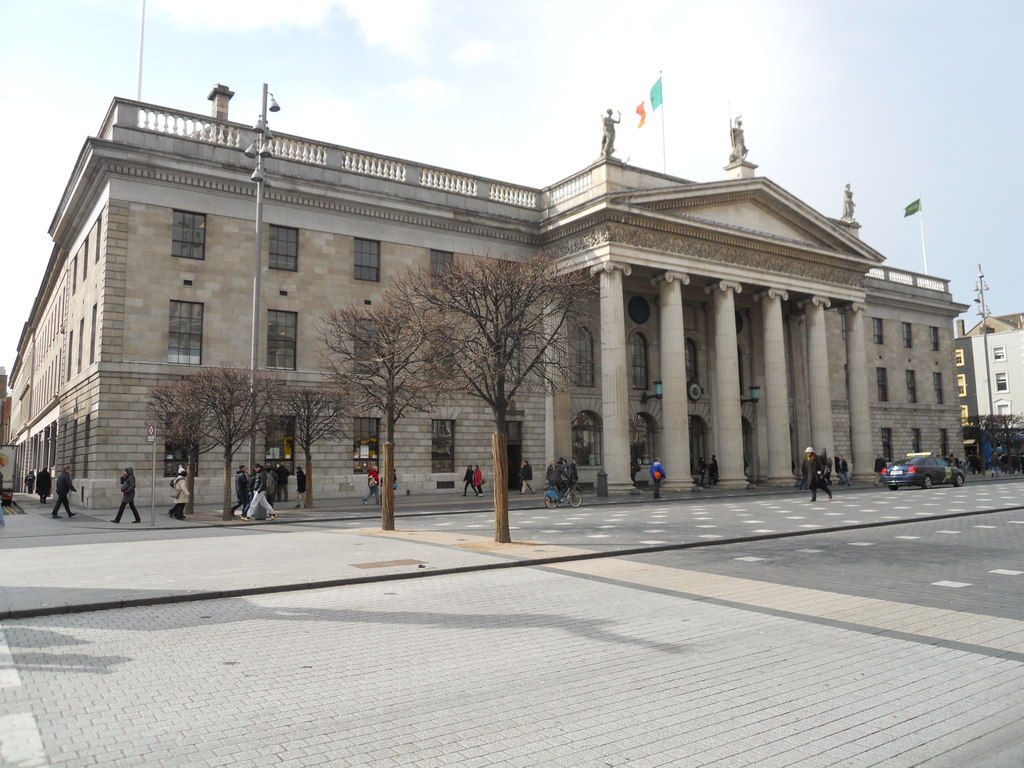
- External view of the GPO. The museum is largely located in the basement of the building.

- Location within Central Dublin
- Former name: An Post Museum (2010–2015)
- Established: 29 March 2016
- Location: General Post Office, O'Connell Street, Dublin, Ireland
- Coordinates: 53.349502°N 6.260560°W
- Type: Postal museum
- Public transit access: O'Connell Street bus stops Abbey Street Luas stop (Red Line)
- Parking: Park Rite, Q-Park, Ilac, Jervis Street
- Website: www.gpomuseum.ie

The GPO Museum is located in the General Post Office in Dublin, Ireland. It opened on 29 March 2016.

The GPO building is known historically for being the headquarters of the 1916 Easter Rising, which led to the creation of the Republic of Ireland. The GPO Museum covers modern Irish history, including the 1916 Easter Rising, the 1919–1921 Irish War of Independence, the 1921 Anglo-Irish Treaty, the 1922–1923 Irish Civil War, and The Troubles (1960s–1998). It also covers the Northern Ireland peace process, resulting in the 1998 signing of the Good Friday Agreement.

== An Post Museum ==
On the same location was the An Post Museum, open between 28 July 2010 and 30 May 2015. It was a small museum that offered visitors an insight into the role played by the Post Office in the development of Irish society over many generations. The An Post Museum & Archive continues to hold the Post Office's heritage and philatelic collections, mount occasional temporary displays of its material and publish research on aspects of Irish Post Office history. As well as Irish stamps and philatelic information and a scale model of the GPO, there were several audio visual presentations, An Post's copy of the 1916 Proclamation and a Pepper's ghost dramatisation about the role of the staff who were actually on duty in the GPO on Easter Monday 1916. Much of the information and audiovisual material contained in the museum continues to be available on the website. The physical museum was replaced by a new visitor centre housing a permanent exhibition marking the centenary of the 1916 Easter Rising.
