= Serpost =

Peruvian government post-service company

Servicios Postales del Perú, S.A.
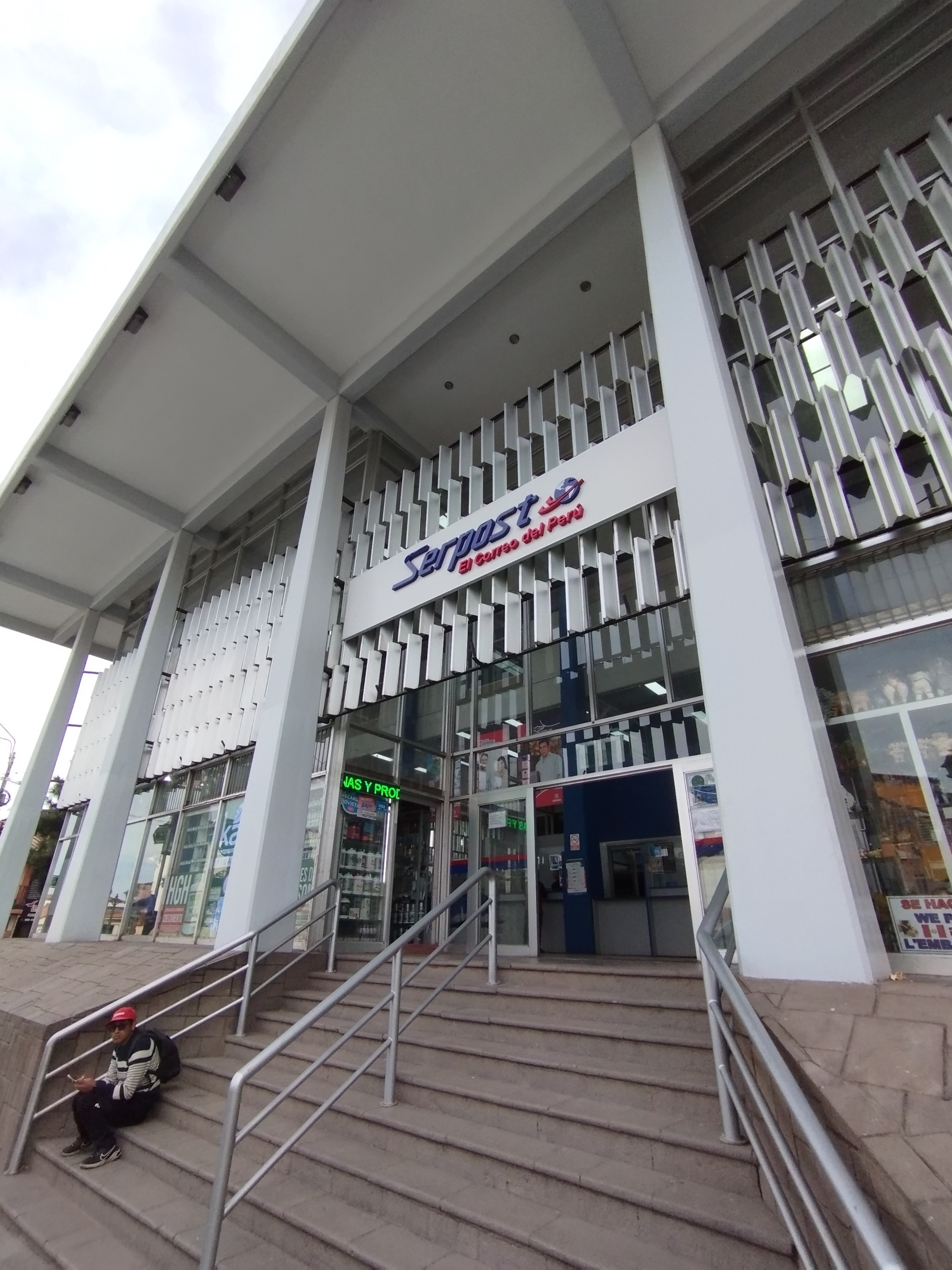
- Post office in Cusco
- Company type: Sociedad anónima
- Industry: Postal service
- Predecessor: Dirección General de Correos y Telégrafos
- Founded: November 5, 1991; 33 years ago
- Headquarters: Lima, Peru
- Owner: Ministry of Transport and Communications
- Website: https://www.serpost.com.pe/

Servicios Postales del Perú, S.A., trading under the name Serpost, is a state-owned postal service and courier of Peru. As the country's national post office, it employs 563 postal workers, 1,744 other workers and has 158 offices in Peru.

The state-owned company is dedicated to the service of correspondence, money orders, and the national and international parcel and delivery market, and fulfills the functions of the Universal Postal Service.

== History ==
The company was created on November 5, 1991 through Supreme Decree #685, succeeding the Dirección General de Correos y Telégrafos, which had a monopoly on the postal service of Peru since 1916. It formally started functioning on November 22, 1994.

== See also ==
- Casa de Correos y Telégrafos
- Postal Union of the Americas, Spain and Portugal
- List of national postal services § The Americas
