= Casa de Correos y Telégrafos =

Historical building in Lima, Peru

Coordinates: 12.0445°S 77.0312°W

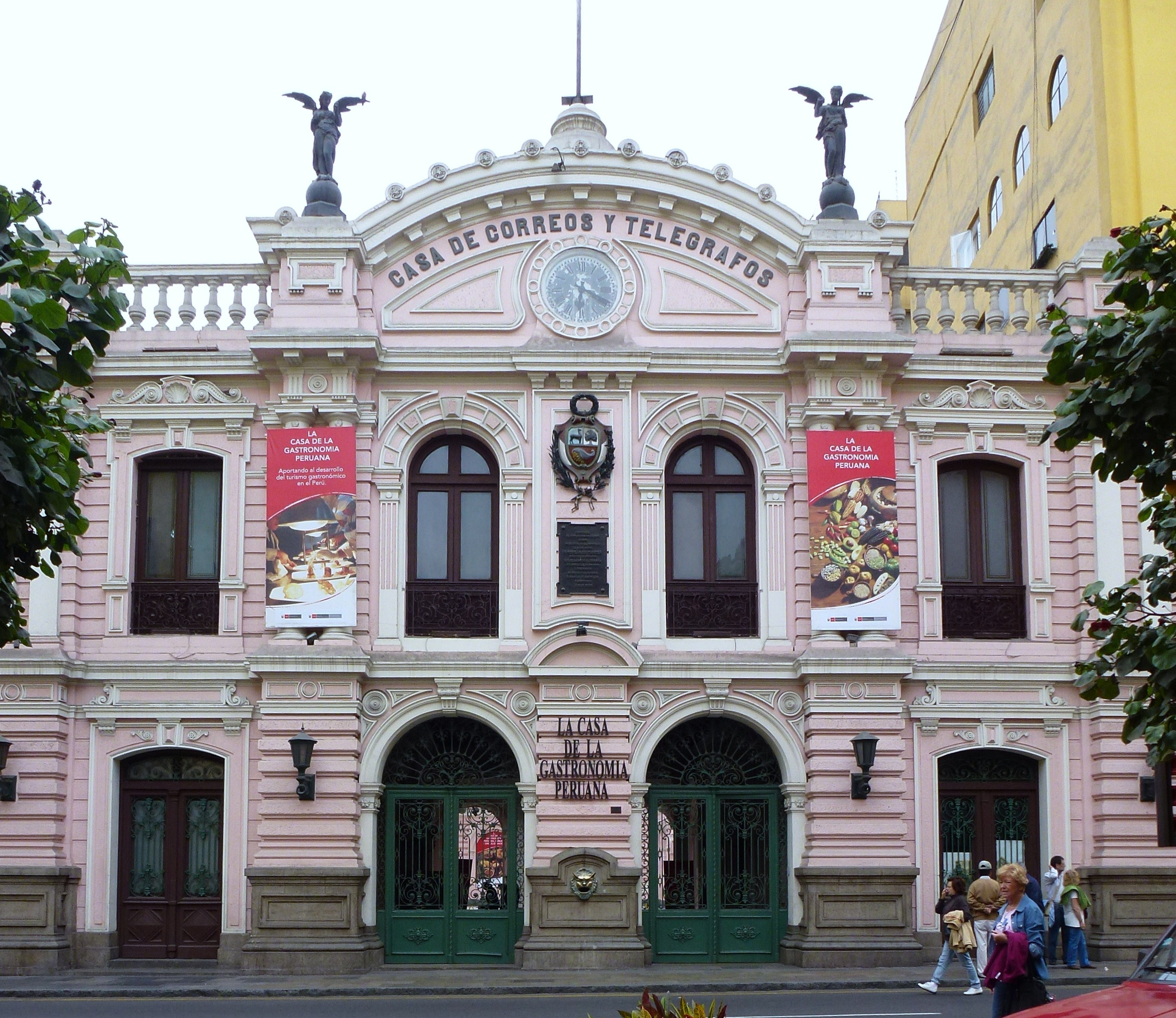
- Interactive map of the Casa de Correos y Telégrafos area

General information
- Architectural style: Beaux-Arts
- Location: Conde de Superunda 170
- Year built: 1892–1897

Technical details
- Floor count: 2

Design and construction
- Architects: Emilio Pazo, Máximo Doig

The Casa de Correos y Telégrafos (Post and Telegraph office in English) is the central post office of the city of Lima, Peru. The building is located at Conde de Superunda street in the historic centre of Lima, near the Plaza Mayor. The building was constructed in 1897 in the Beaux-Arts architectural style. Additionally, the building houses the Postal and Philatelic Museum of Peru (Museo Postal y Filatélico del Perú) and a Serpost office. Besides displaying exhibits relating to postal service, the museum showcases exhibits relating to the history of Lima.

The building's interior passageway dates back to 1924, and is known as the Pasaje Piura (also known as the Pasaje del Correo), and its interior is lined with shops. Its facade contains a clock, and a bronze lion depicted with its snout open and devouring correspondence. The building occupies an area of 6,537 m^{2}, and adjacent to it are parts of a gravestone, belonging to politician Rodrigo Franco Montes de Peralta, used as part of the pathway.

== History ==
The building was inaugurated by president Nicolás de Piérola on December 31, 1897.

A project by PROLIMA aims to restore and modernise the building, restituting its former atlantes, removed in 1964 under mayor Anita Fernandini and an 18th-century structure known as the Tambo de Polvos Azules.

== See also ==
- Serpost
