= Caudan Waterfront =

Le Caudan Waterfront
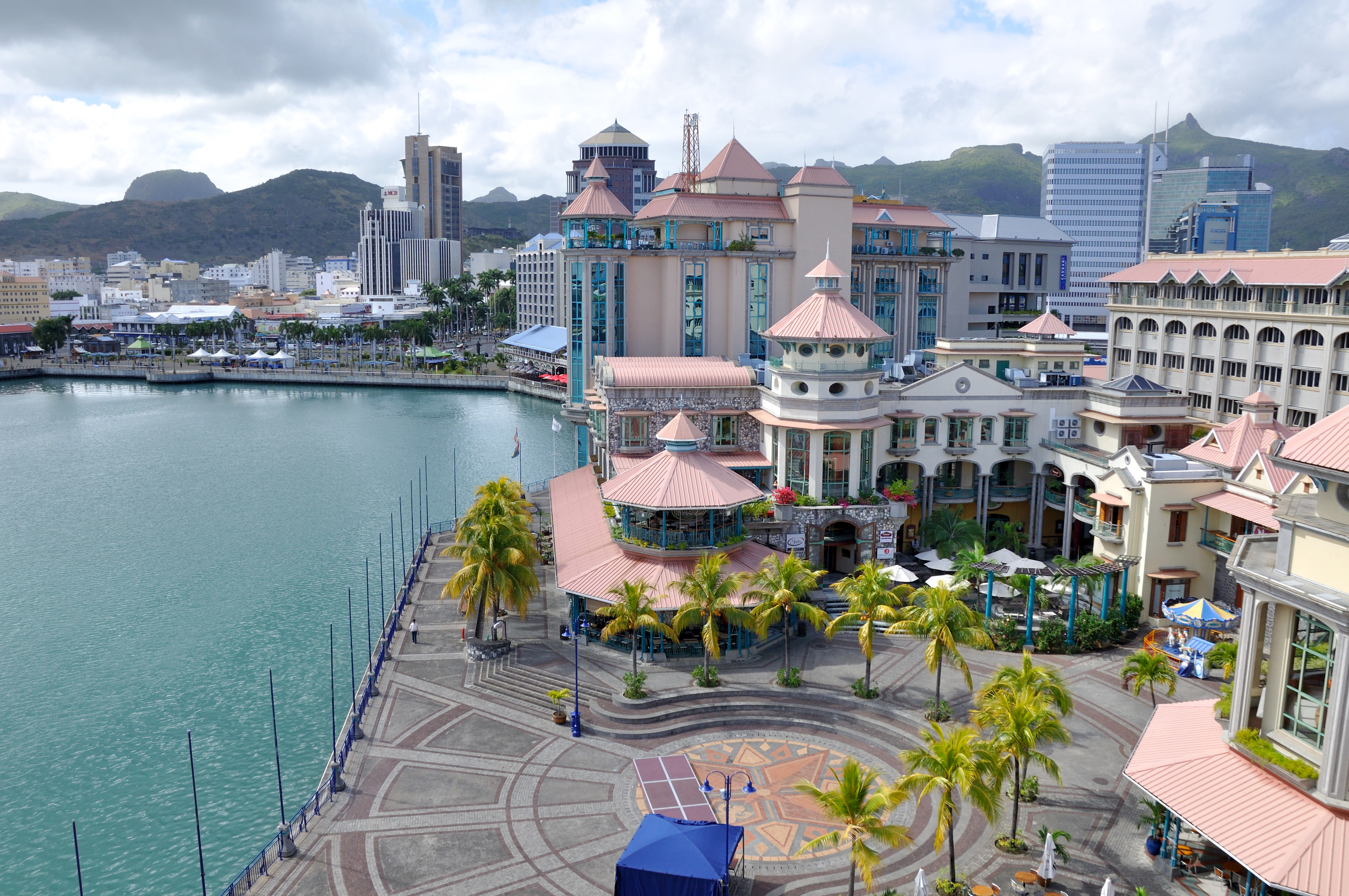
- The Caudan Waterfront
- Location: Port Louis, Mauritius
- Coordinates: 20.161505°S 57.498448°E
- Address: Marina Quay, Caudan, Port Louis
- Opened: 1996
- Website: www.caudan.com

Le Caudan Waterfront is a commercial development in Port Louis, the capital city of Mauritius. It includes shops, banking facilities, casinos, cinemas, restaurants, a marina and a five star hotel (Le Labourdonnais).

== History ==
The name of Le Caudan Waterfront comes from a famous figure of the past, Jean Dominique Michel de Caudan, who came to former Isle de France from Languedoc (a historical province in the South of France).

He started a saltpan in 1726, close to a small bay in the southwest of Port-Louis. This area, now known as the Robert Edward Hart Garden, is situated on the entrance road to Le Caudan Waterfront.

A historical site, the peninsula called Le Caudan was created around a fossil coral islet, hosting a powder magazine, an astronomic and meteorological observatory, quays, warehouses and various small enterprises over the last 250 years. The daily routine of this popular harbor followed the pace of the sugar industry until the creation of the Bulk Sugar Terminal in 1980. From these 150 years of millions of sugar bags transiting by boat, train or trucks, carried by hundreds of hands, only a few old walls still stand today to speak to the mind.

Several popular spots of Le Caudan Waterfront bear a strong historical significance. The first meteorological observatory of the Indian Ocean now hosts the Food Court and the Namasté restaurant. The building hosting the Blue Penny Museum was the former Docks office.

The appellations of the different wings of the complex are indeed reminiscent of episodes of the country's colonial history:

• The main building, known as Barkly Wharf, was named after Sir Henry Barkly, Member of Parliament of the British government and appointed governor of Mauritius from 1863-1870.

• Le Pavillon wing: an ancient map of Port Louis reveals the existence of Pavillon Street exactly where the Pedestrian Alley of Le Caudan is now located. It is speculated that the origin of this appellation might date back to the period when Port Louis was called ‘Port Napoléon’.

• Dias Pier, the most recent wing of Le Caudan Waterfront, is a tribute to Diogo Dias, brother of the famous navigator Barthoulomeu Dias. Based on some historical evidence, it is believed that Diogo Dias was the first to record the Mascarene Islands, which include Mauritius, on a navigation map.

== Modern Day ==
Caudan, as it is now commonly known, was the first major shopping development of its kind on the island of Mauritius.

It remains to this day an iconic shopping destination for locals and tourists alike. In the mall, visitors will find the latest fashion shops and trends, a popular arts and craft market, known as the Craft Market, Specialty shops selling unique local goods such as replica ships, Indian garments, locally fabricated jewelry or art paintings from local artists. The shopping center also boasts cinemas, a marina, a bookstore, restaurants and cafes, a museum, hosting two of the rarest stamps in the world, a casino and tax free shopping options for tourists.

Although being the first shopping mall on the island, Caudan has been able to keep up with the trends and maintains its allure as a modern waterfront mall.

From its premises, visitors can also admire the workings going in the port as large container and cruise ships make their way in and out.

The Caudan Arts Centre is the next stage of Caudan's development. It will host plays, operas, and conferences during the day and be a game changer for Mauritius. The centre is scheduled to open in December 2018 with a game changing talent competition, Caudan Live.

== See also ==
- Port Louis
- Aapravasi Ghat (UNESCO site)
