= Blue Penny Museum =

Museum in Port Louis, Mauritius

Coordinates: 20°09′39″S 57°29′51″E

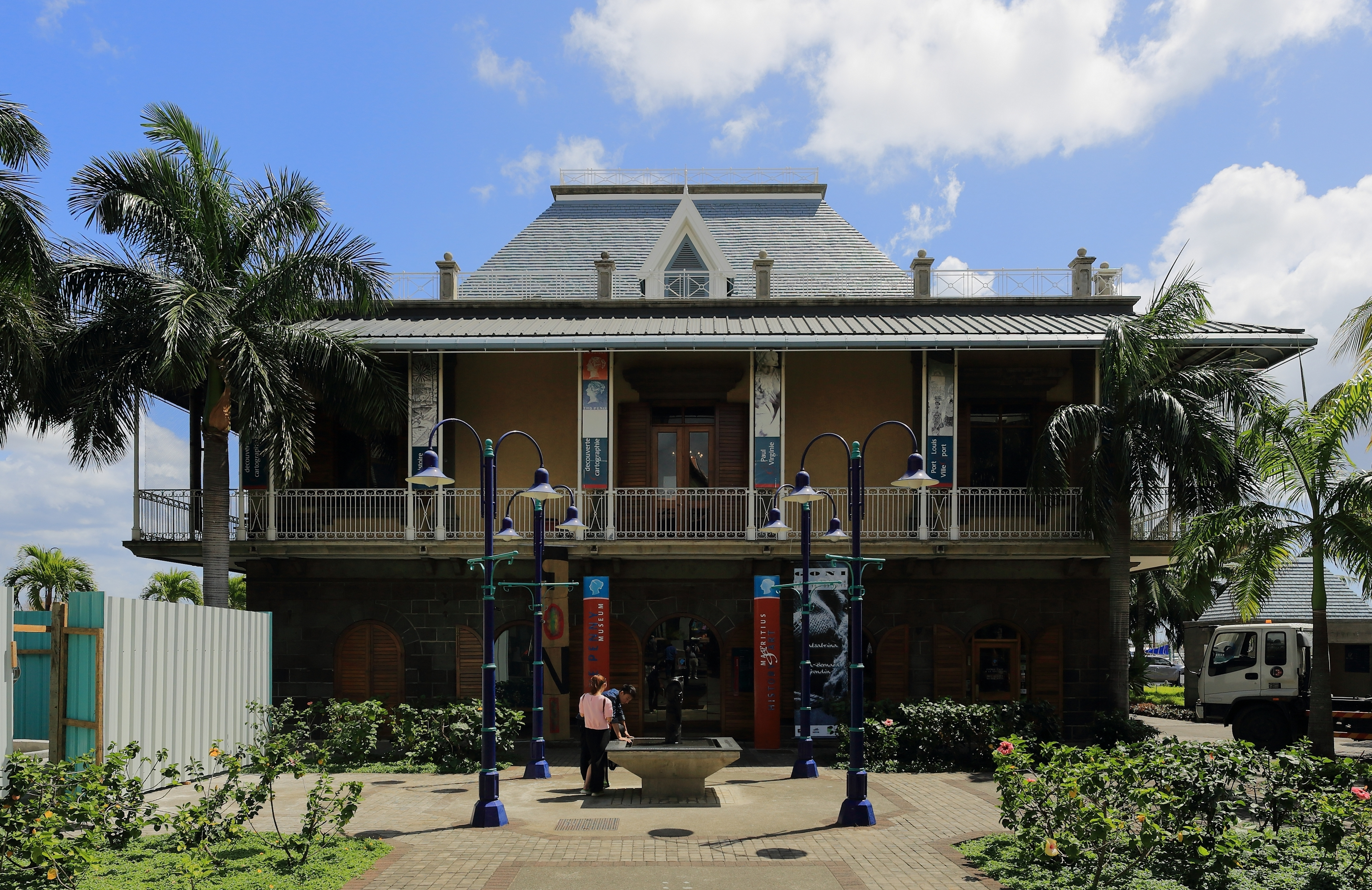
- Museum building
- Location: Caudan Waterfront; Port Louis RFQX+J2C; Mauritius
- Key holdings: Blue Penny stamp
- Owner: MCB Group

The Blue Penny Museum, a museum dedicated to history and art of Mauritius, is situated at Caudan Waterfront in Port Louis, the capital of Mauritius. It opened in November 2001.

== Collections and exhibits ==
The museum collection includes the 1847 Blue Penny and Red Penny stamps. The stamps were bought in 1993 for $2,000,000 by a consortium of Mauritian enterprises headed by The Mauritius Commercial Bank and brought back to Mauritius after almost 150 years. For conservation, the originals are illuminated only temporarily. Most of the time only copies are to be seen.

The museum, founded by The Mauritius Commercial Bank, also houses the original statue of Paul and Virginia, created in 1881 by Prosper d'Épinay.

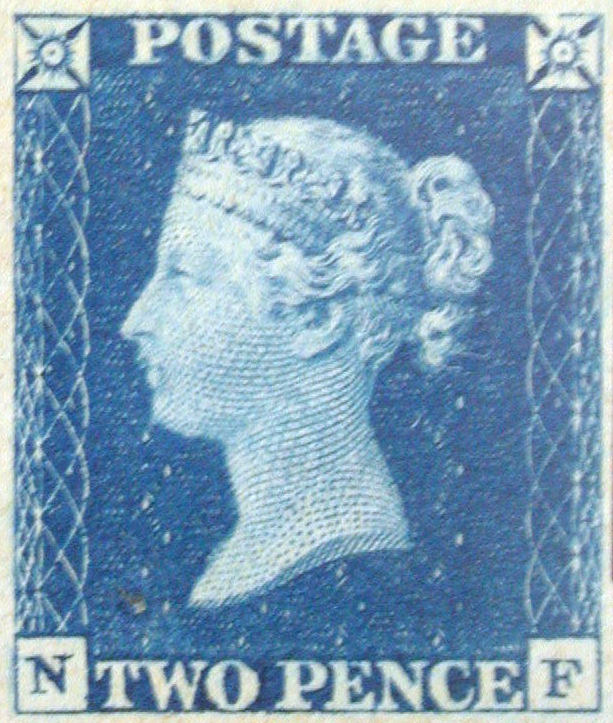
Blue Penny stamp
