= Turkish Cypriot Bureau of Telecommunications =

- Native name: Telekomünikasyon Dairesi
- Company type: Governmental organisation
- Industry: Telecommunications
- Area served: Northern Cyprus
- Website: http://telekom.gov.ct.tr

The Turkish Cypriot Bureau of Telecommunications is a governmental organisation providing telecommunications services in Northern Cyprus. It is the only provider of Landline and wholesale Broadband services in Northern Cyprus, as well as providing and maintaining critical infrastructure required for all telecommunications.

== Statistics ==
=== ADSL ===
As of 31 January 2019, there is a total countrywide capacity of 38,914 ports for ADSL, and only 47.07% of these ports are under use. For comparison, there was a total countrywide capacity of 36,517 ports for ADSL and 53.91% of these ports were under use.

=== Landline ===
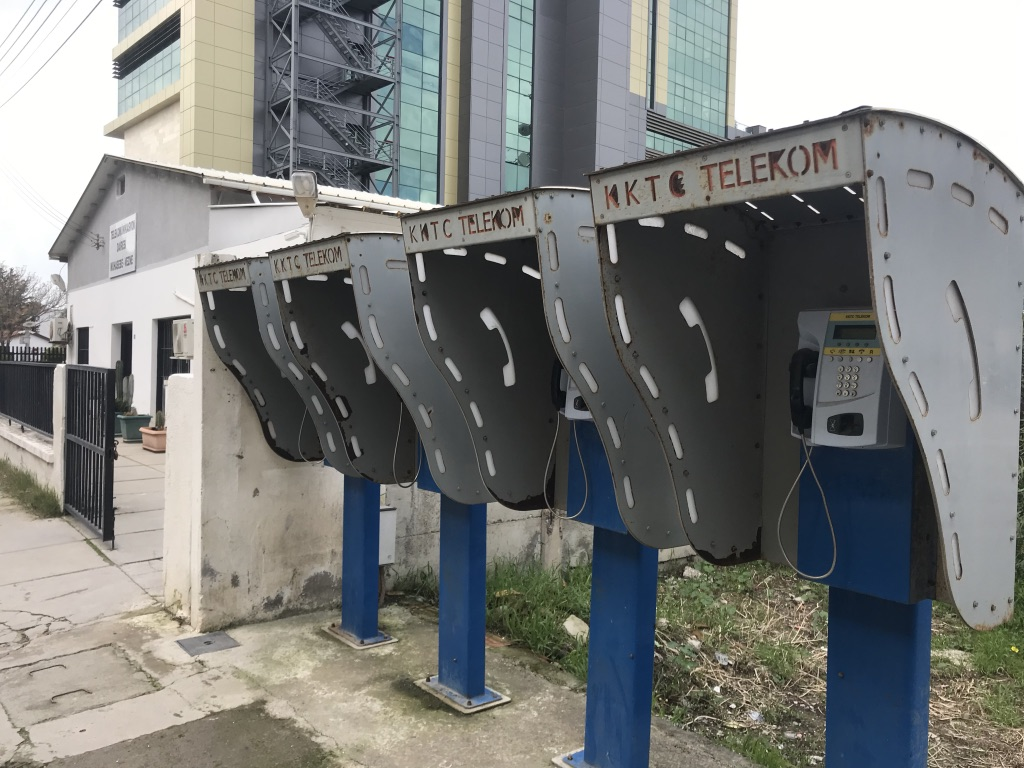
Telephone Boxes Owned and Operated by the Turkish Cypriot Telecommunications Bureau

As of 31 January 2019, there is a total countrywide capacity of 140,993 in the telephone exchange and 60.03% of this capacity has been taken.

== International Submarine Fiber Optic Connectivity ==
Currently, all international links are provided through the Turcyos-1 and Turcyos-2 fiber optic submarine cables provided by Türk Telekom. The Turcyos-1 cable was inaugurated in July 1991 and was tendered to AT&T, Pirelli, and Alcatel-Lucent by PTT (Turkey). Turcyos-2, inaugurated in 2011, provides an 800 Gbps link to Northern Cyprus from Turkey, which aims to meet increasing data traffic demands in the TRNC, and grant users faster access to next generation technologies.
