= Grand Post Office =

Office building in Istanbul, Turkey

Istanbul Main Post Office
- Büyük Postane (Grand Post Office)
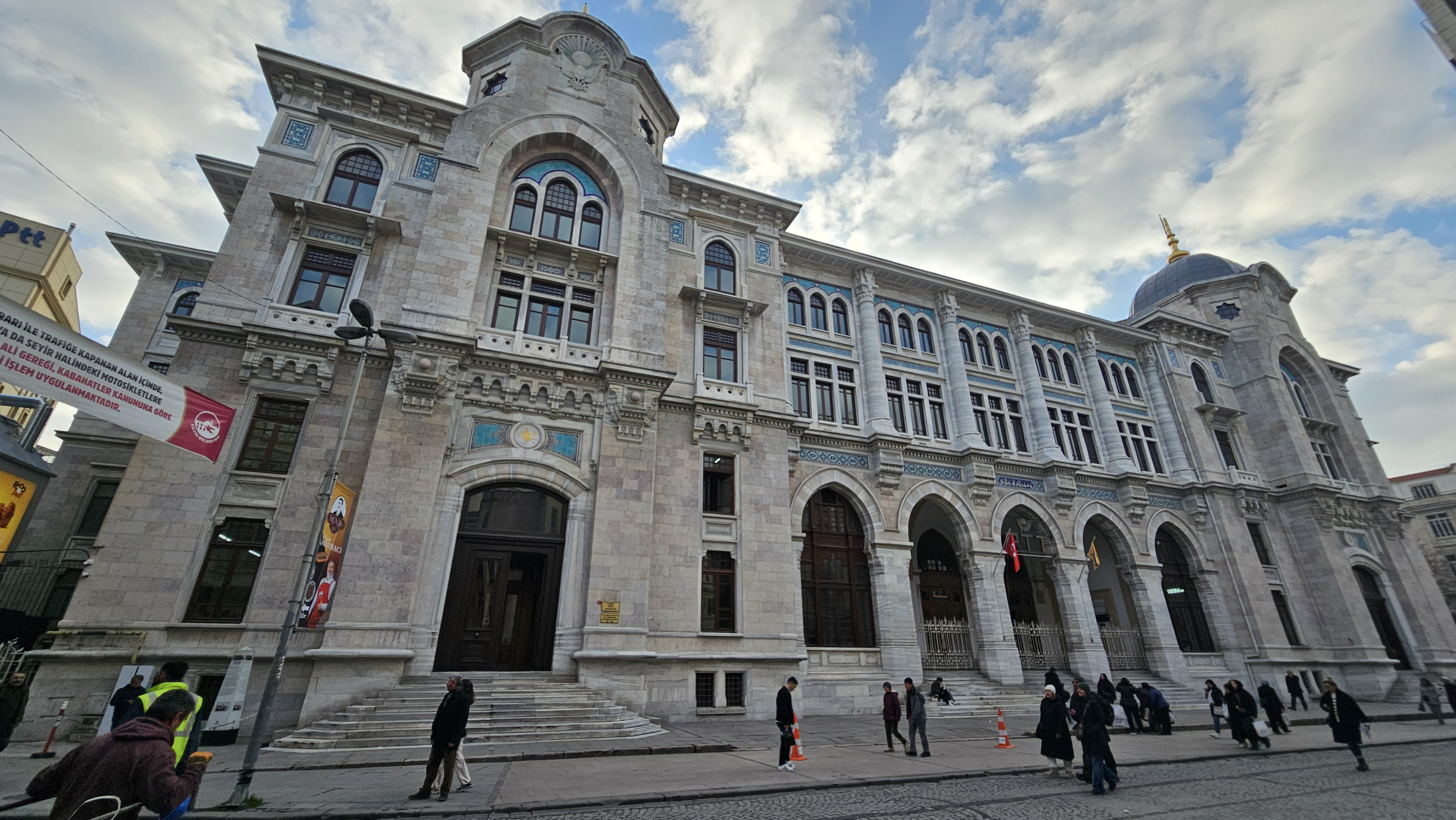
- Istanbul Main Post Office

- Location within Istanbul
- Former names: Yeni Postane (New Post Office) *Posta ve Telegraf Nezareti (Ministry of Post and Telegraph)
- Alternative names: Sirkeci PTT Merkezi (Sirkeci Post Office)

General information
- Architectural style: Turkish Neoclassical
- Location: Sirkeci, Büyük Postane Cad. 25, Istanbul, Turkey
- Coordinates: 41.014568°N 28.974140°E
- Construction started: 1905
- Completed: 1909
- Owner: Turkish Post

Technical details
- Floor count: 4
- Floor area: (3,200 m^{2} (34,000 sq ft))

Design and construction
- Architect: Vedat Tek
- Main contractor: Ottoman Government

The Istanbul Grand Post Office (Turkish: Büyük Postane), or Istanbul Main Post Office, is an office building for postal services located in the Sirkeci neighborhood of the Eminönü quarter within the Fatih district of Istanbul, Turkey. It was designed by architect Vedat Tek in First Turkish National architectural style and was constructed between 1905 and 1909. The four-story building houses a post office, the Sirkeci Post Office (Turkish: Sirkeci PTT Merkezi), office space for regional administration and, also since 2000, the Istanbul Postal Museum (Turkish: PTT İstanbul Müzesi). It is Turkey's largest post office building.

== History ==
Initially planned for use as the Ministry of Post and Telegraph building in the Ottoman Empire, its construction began in 1905, and was completed in 1909. An inscription in Ottoman Turkish alphabet on the tiled panel above the main entrance denotes "Ministry of Post and Telegraph" (Ottoman Turkish: پوسته و تلغراف نظارتی). The building was renamed "New Post Office" (Turkish: Yeni Postane) in the 1930s, some time after the establishment of the Turkish Republic, and then "Grand Post Office" (Turkish: Büyük Postane).

In the Republic's early years, between 1927 and 1936, the building temporarily housed Istanbul Radio. From 1958 on, it was used solely for postal and telegraphy services. Today, the ground floor is the Sirkeci Post Office, the first floor is occupied by its directorate while the second and third floors are offices for the regional post directorate of Istanbul's European side.

On May 6, 2000, part of the building was converted into Istanbul Postal Museum occupying four stories. The museum informs visitors about the country's history of communication and telecommunication services that officially began on October 23, 1840. The museum consists of four sections for post, telegraph, telephone and postage stamps.

== Architecture ==
The Main Post Office is situated in close distance to Spice Bazaar, New Mosque, Sirkeci Railway Terminal and Istanbul 4th Vakıf Han, which is a five-star hotel today. Architect Vedat Tek (1873–1942) designed the building as one of the earliest examples of First Turkish National architecture style.

The four-story building has a floor area of (3,200 m^{2} (34,000 sq ft)). The main entrance is elevated reachable by stairs in front of the building. The building is flanked by two turrets. The facade is of cut stone and marble. It is believed that the bricks were specially designed by Vedat Tek. 16th century style classical Ottoman decorative elements are predominant in the building's ornaments including its facade with two-color stone workmanship, tiled panels with Islamic geometric patterns and Kufic calligraphic scripts, sills with tiled panels as well as muqarnas in pillar heads and corbels.

The main entrance opens to a very large atrium in the center of the building. The three-story high, rectangle shaped hall is surrounded by office rooms at each floor. The atrium is topped by glass in mainly orange and blue colors.

== Image gallery ==
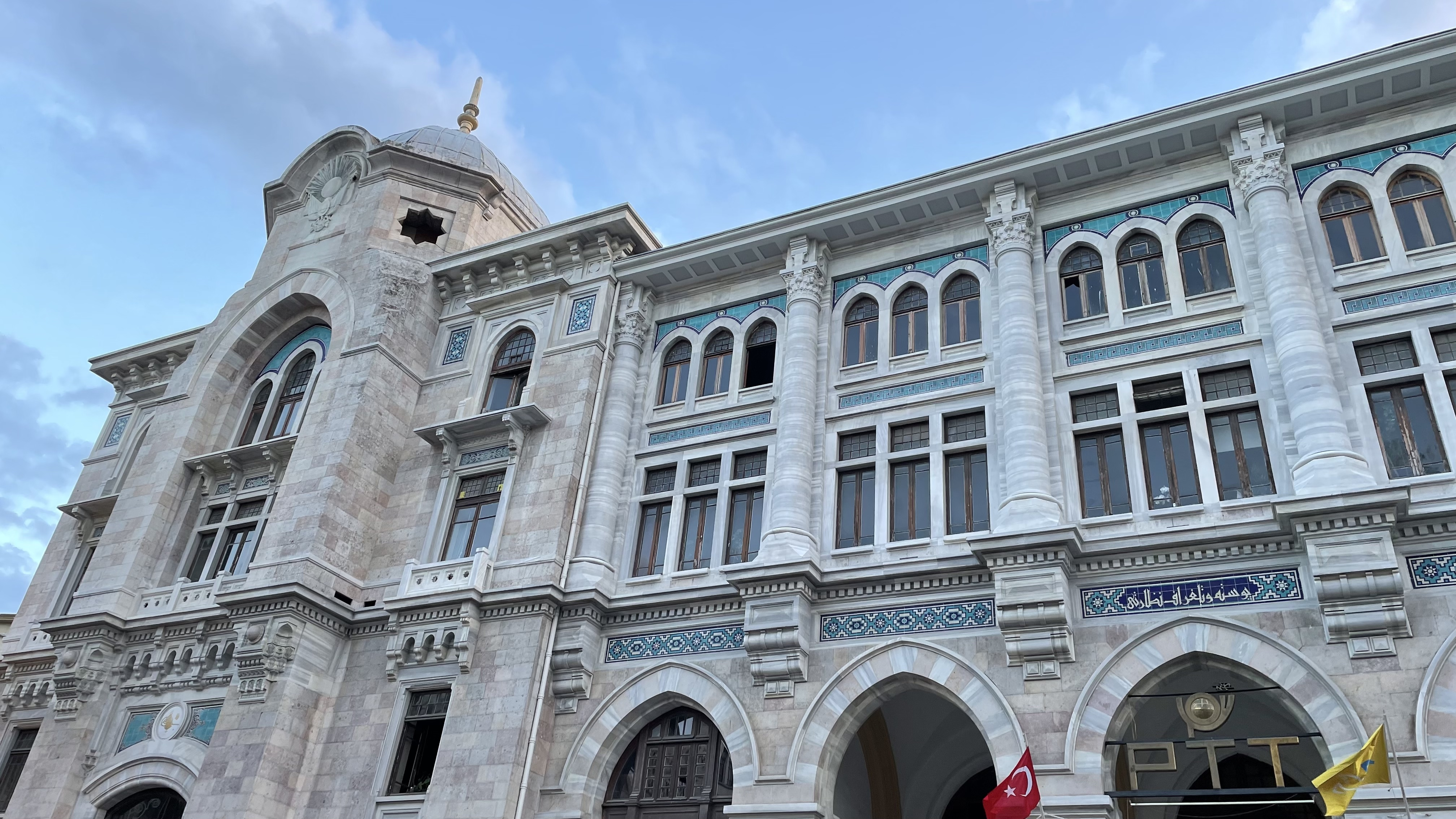
Exterior view of Istanbul Grand Post Office

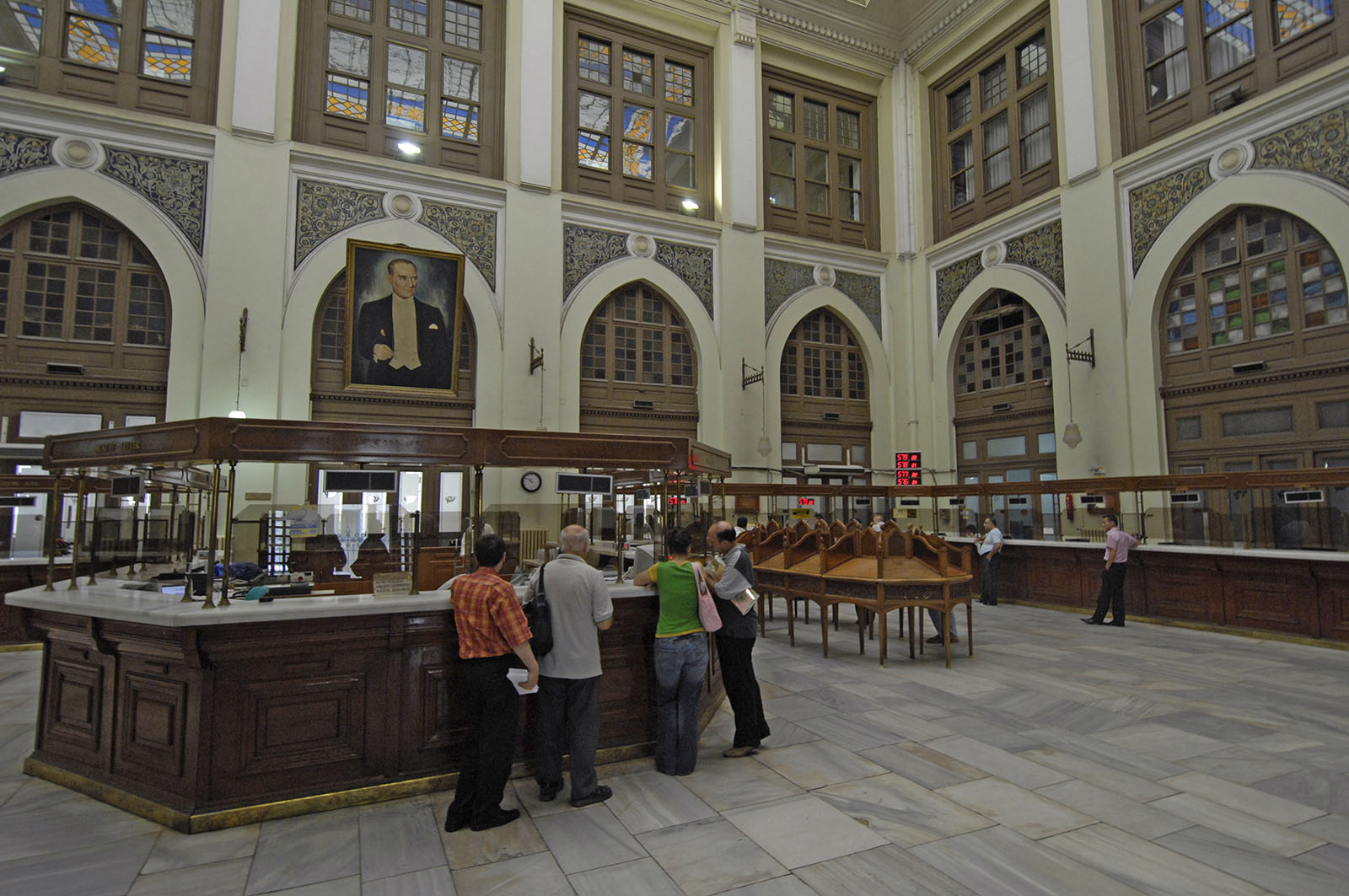
Interior view of Istanbul Grand Post Office

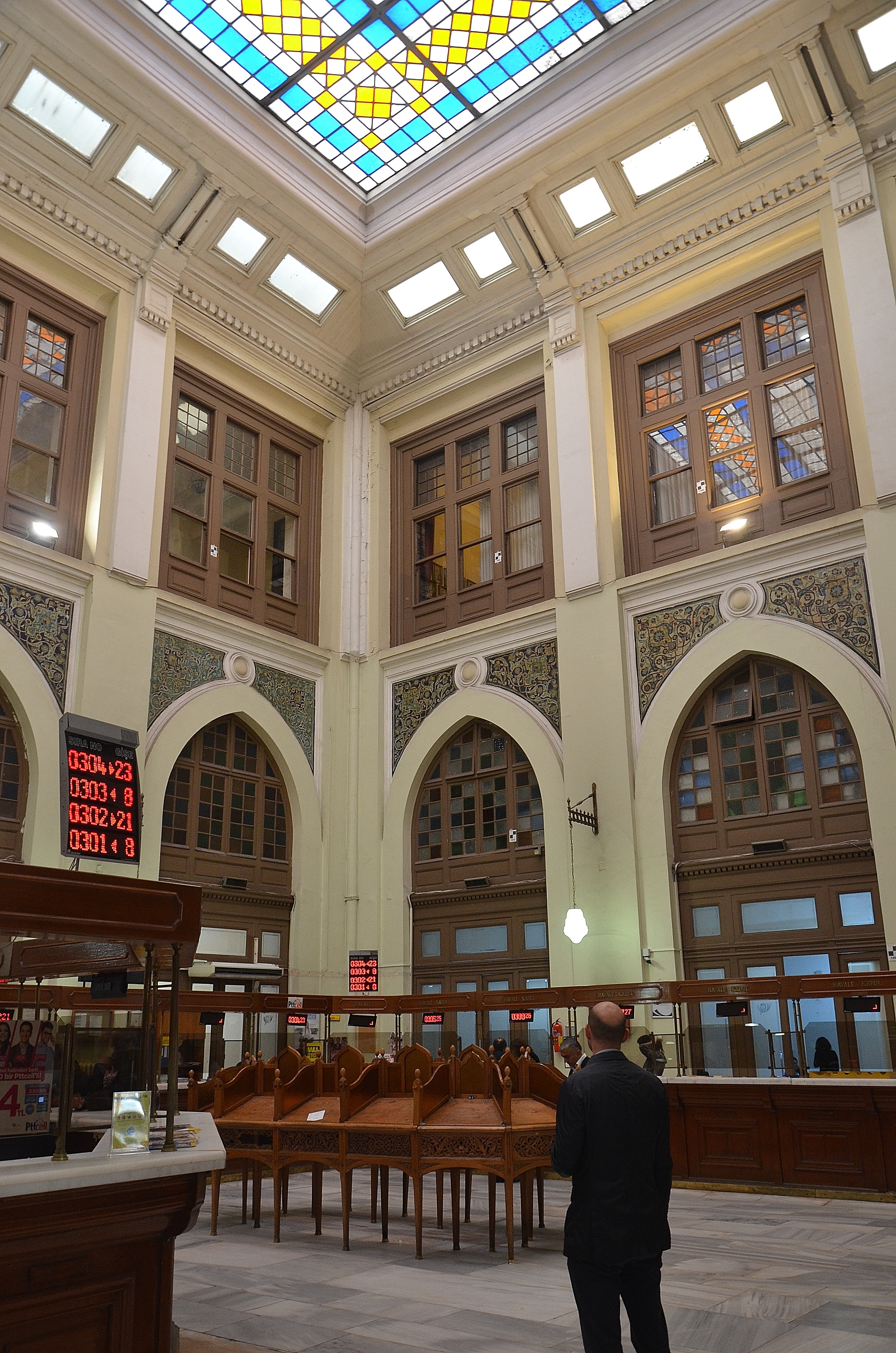
Interior view of Istanbul Grand Post Office

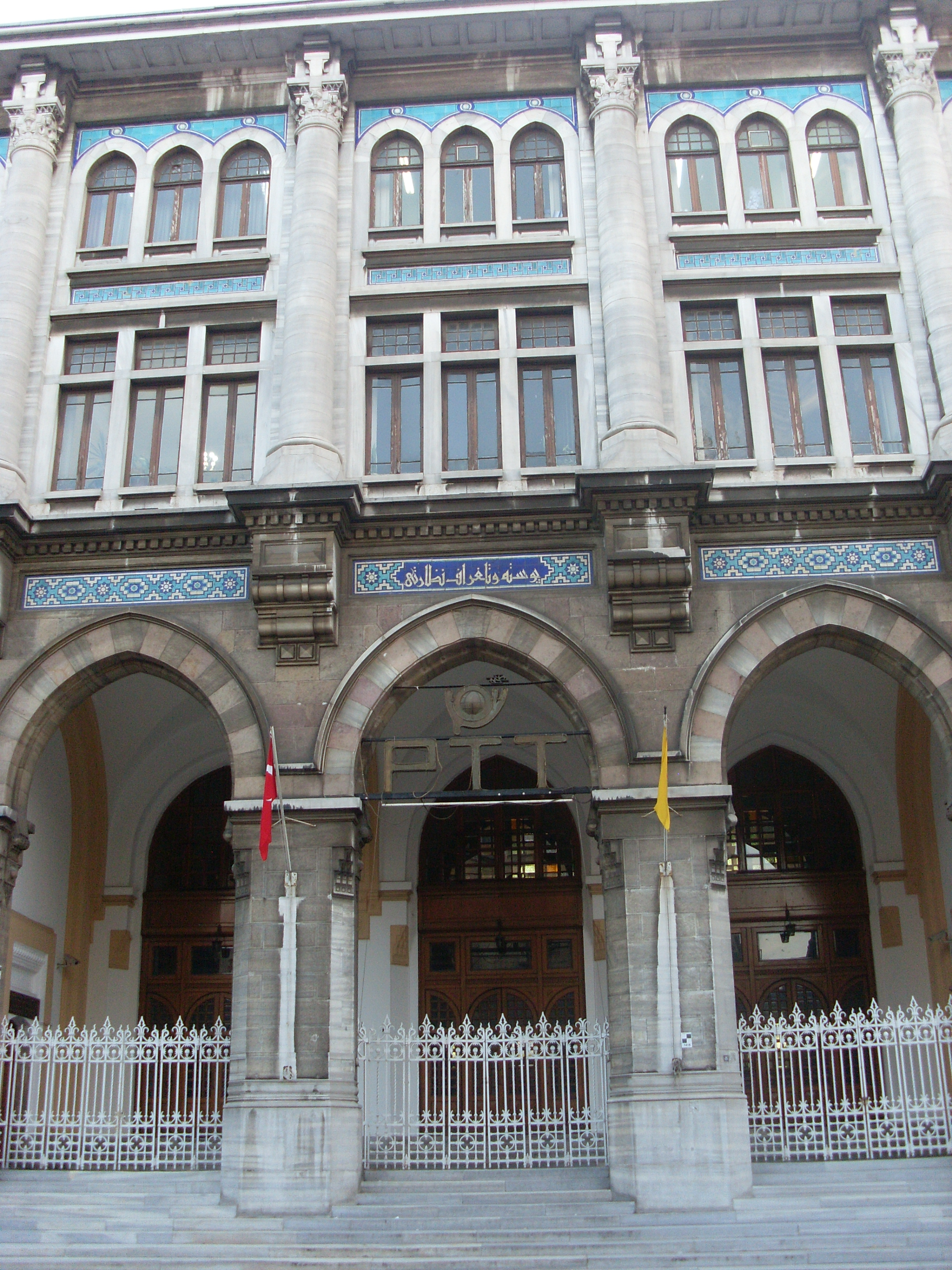
Main entrance with inscription above

== See also ==
- Istanbul Postal Museum
