= Istanbul Postal Museum =

- PTT İstanbul Müzesi
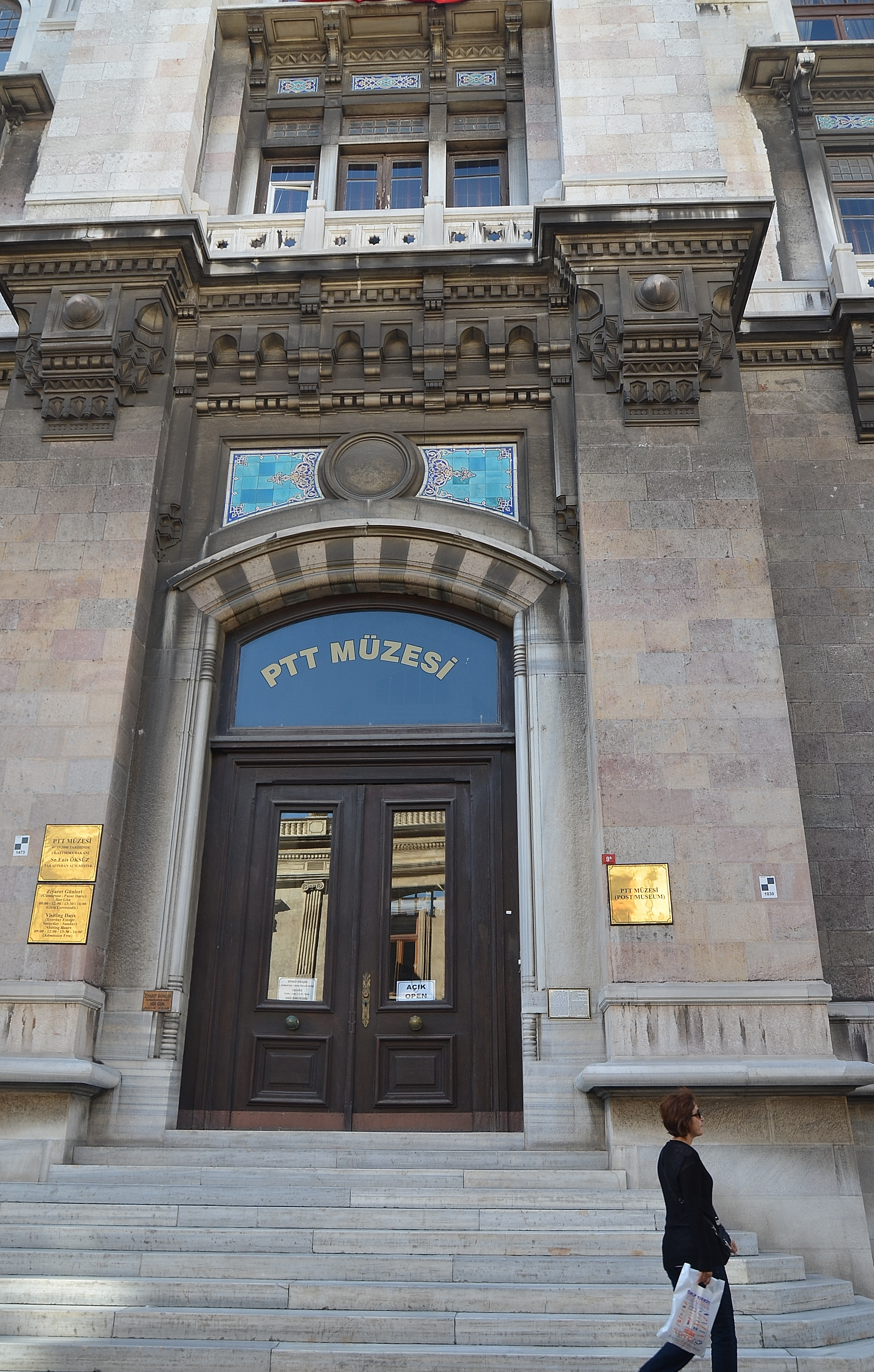
- Istanbul Postal Museum's entrance

- Location of Istanbul Postal Museum in Istanbul, Turkey
- Established: May 6, 2000; 26 years ago
- Location: Sirkeci, Istanbul, Turkey
- Coordinates: 41.01485°N 28.97361°E
- Type: Postal museum
- Owner: Turkish Post
- Website: http://www.ptt.gov.tr/?wapp=pttMuseum_en&open=1

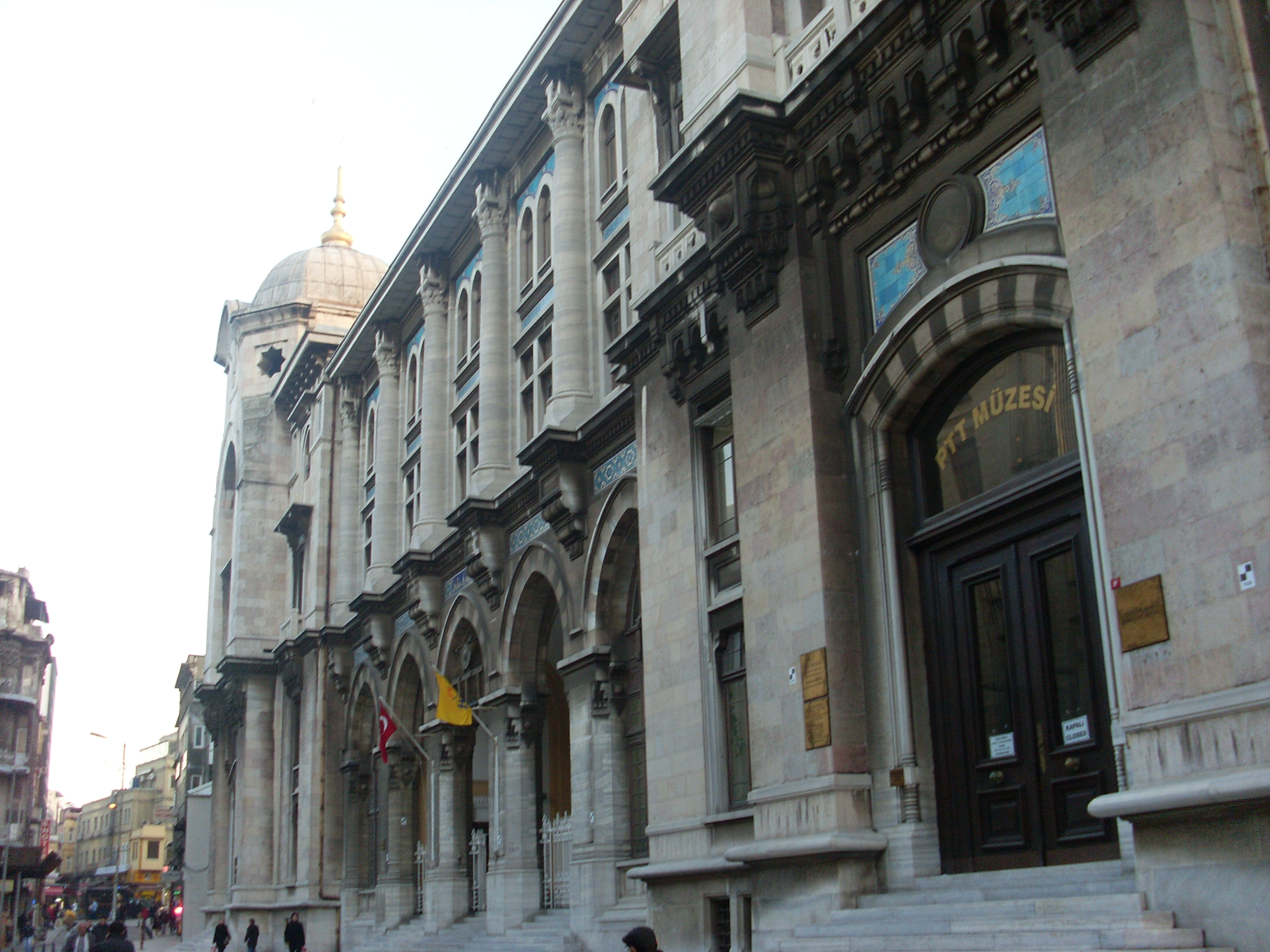
Istanbul Postal Museum (entrance at right) at the Grand Post Office building in Sirkeci, Istanbul

The Istanbul Postal Museum, aka PTT Museum Istanbul (Turkish: PTT İstanbul Müzesi), is a postal museum dedicated to the historical development of mail and telecommunication services in the Ottoman Empire and Turkey, exhibiting related equipment and instruments as well as a collection of postage stamps. It was established in 2000 by the Turkish Post, and is situated inside the Grand Post Office building at Sirkeci quarter of Fatih district in Istanbul, Turkey.

== Museum building ==
The Main Post Office (Turkish: Büyük Postane), which houses the museum, is a historical four-story building designed by architect Vedat Tek (1873–1942) in First Turkish National architectural style. It was constructed between 1905 and 1909 during the last period of the Ottoman Empire as the building of the Ministry of Post and Telegraph (Ottoman Turkish: Posta ve Telgraf Nezareti). Later, it was turned into a post office.

The museum has a separate entrance and occupies four stories in the western part of the building. It informs visitors about the country's history of communication and telecommunication services that officially began on October 23, 1840 with the foundation of the Ottoman Ministry of Post (Ottoman Turkish: Posta Nezareti). Established on May 6, 2000 by the Turkish Post, the museum consists of four sections for mail, telegraph, telephone and postage stamps. Photos taken during the construction of the building are also on exhibit.

== Mail ==
Examples of various uniforms worn by military couriers and mail carriers from the Constitutional era in the beginning of the 20th century and from the Republican era after 1923 to present time can be seen fitted on dolls and mannequins. Historical postal service items like mail satchels, mail pouches, mail sacks, letter boxes, locator maps, franking machines from the Ottoman and Republican era are on display.

== Telegraph ==
An inscription plate of the first telegraph office shows the year 1855. A painting depicting a battle scene from the Crimean War (1853–1856) affiliates with the first use of telegraphy in the Ottoman Empire on September 9, 1855. A telegraph was dispatched from Shumen (Bulgaria, then Ottoman Empire) to the capital Istanbul relayed in Edirne. The message reads "Allied troops entered Sevastopol." (Ottoman Turkish: Asâkir-i müttefika Sivastopol'a girmişlerdir.) to report the victory of the Allied troops, along with the Ottomans, ending the Siege of Sevastopol (1854–1855) during the Crimean War.

On the third floor, the telegraphy room of clerk Hamdi Bey of Monastır (today Bitola in North Macedonia) is preserved unchanged from those days with all the historical equipment. He was in charge when the Allied troops of World War I (1914–1918) occupied Istanbul on March 16, 1920 following the Armistice of Mudros. He sent messages to Mustafa Kemal (Atatürk) in Ankara using Morse telegraph about the situation in Istanbul until he was stopped by the enemy soldiers, who entered the post office building.

Later period's teletypewriters and an original telex machine is on exhibit as well.

== Telephone ==
The second floor hosts various early telephone instruments and related equipment. There are telephones with hand-cranked magneto generator or battery-powered, rotary dial and pushbutton dial telephones in both wall and desk versions, also produced in Turkish PTT factories, telephone switchboards, elektromechanical automatic telephone exchanges

Also an exact replica of Alexander Graham Bell's (1842–1922) original telephone from 1882 is exhibited here. It was a gift from the Alcatel-Bell company in 1990 on the 150th anniversary of Turkish Post's establishment. An example of telephone switchboard can be seen, which enabled to manually connect telephone subscribers. The installation of the first electromechanical automatic telephone exchange in Turkey was accomplished on October 23, 1931 making the switchboard operators superfluous.

== Postage stamps ==
The first Turkish postage stamp was issued by Post Minister Agah Efendi (1832–1885) on January 13, 1863. It was printed at the Ottoman Imperial Mint on thin cigarette paper. Postage stamp issues of Universal Postal Union's member countries are also on display along with the stamps of the Ottoman and Republican era as well as first day covers issued after the 1950s.

== Location and access ==
The museum is situated inside the Main Post Office building in Yeni Postane Cad. 25 in Sirkeci quarter of Fatih district in Istanbul. It is open between 08:30-17:30 on workdays only. Admission is free of charge. Museum's vsit is guided by an employee.

== Gallery ==
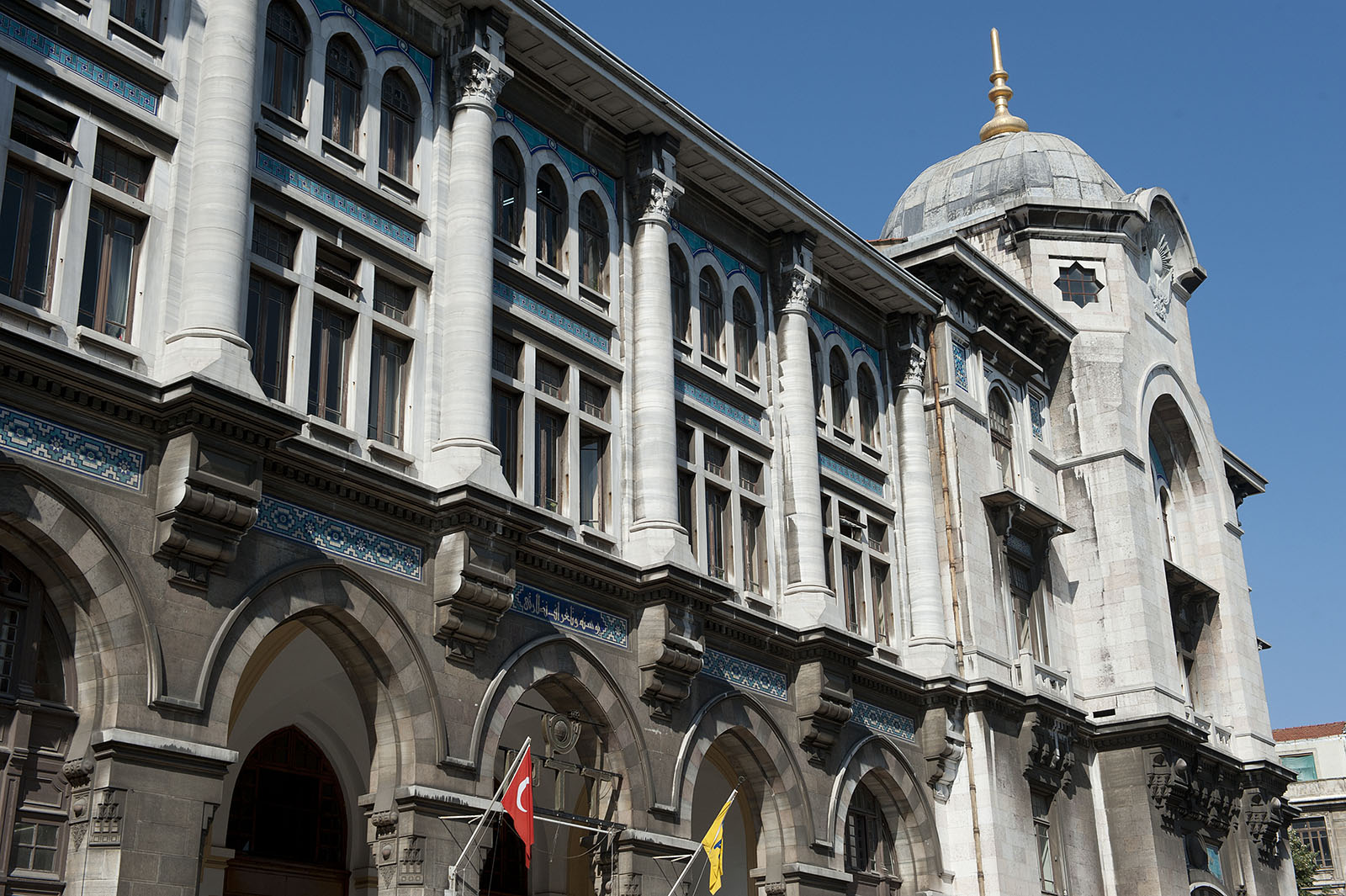
Istanbul Postal Museum Part of facade

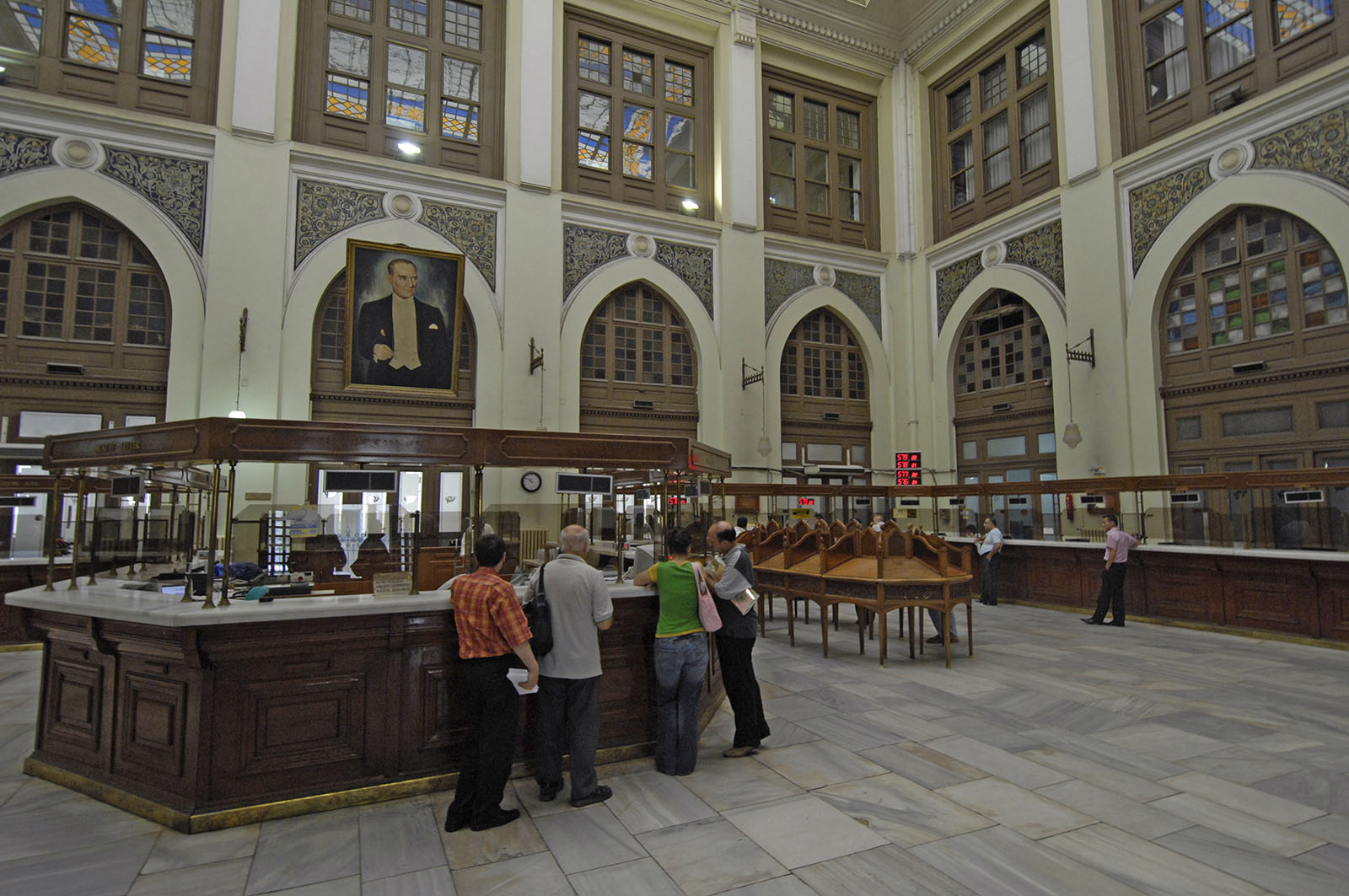
Istanbul Postal Museum Central Hall

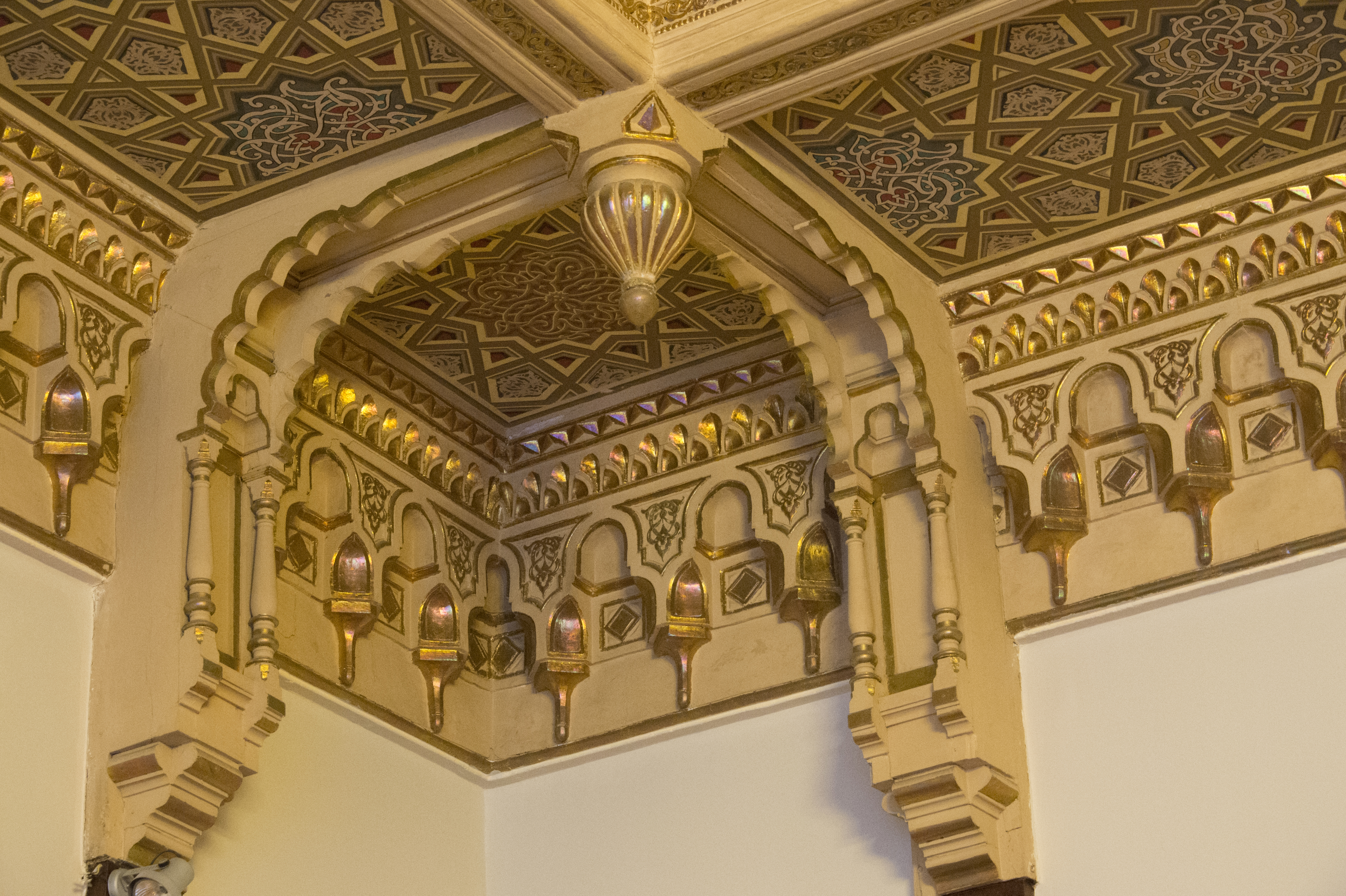
Istanbul Postal Museum Ceiling

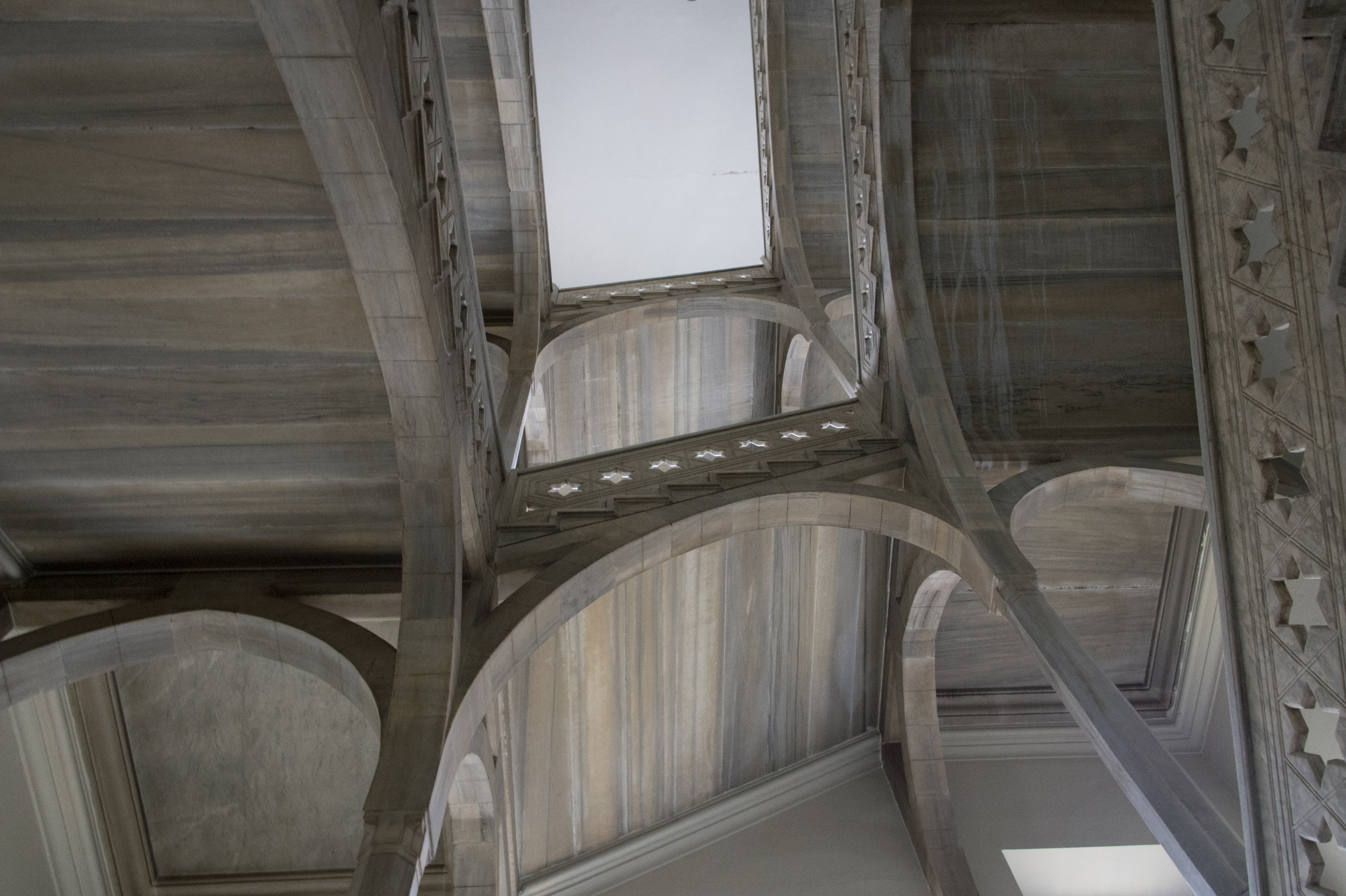
Istanbul Postal Museum Architecture

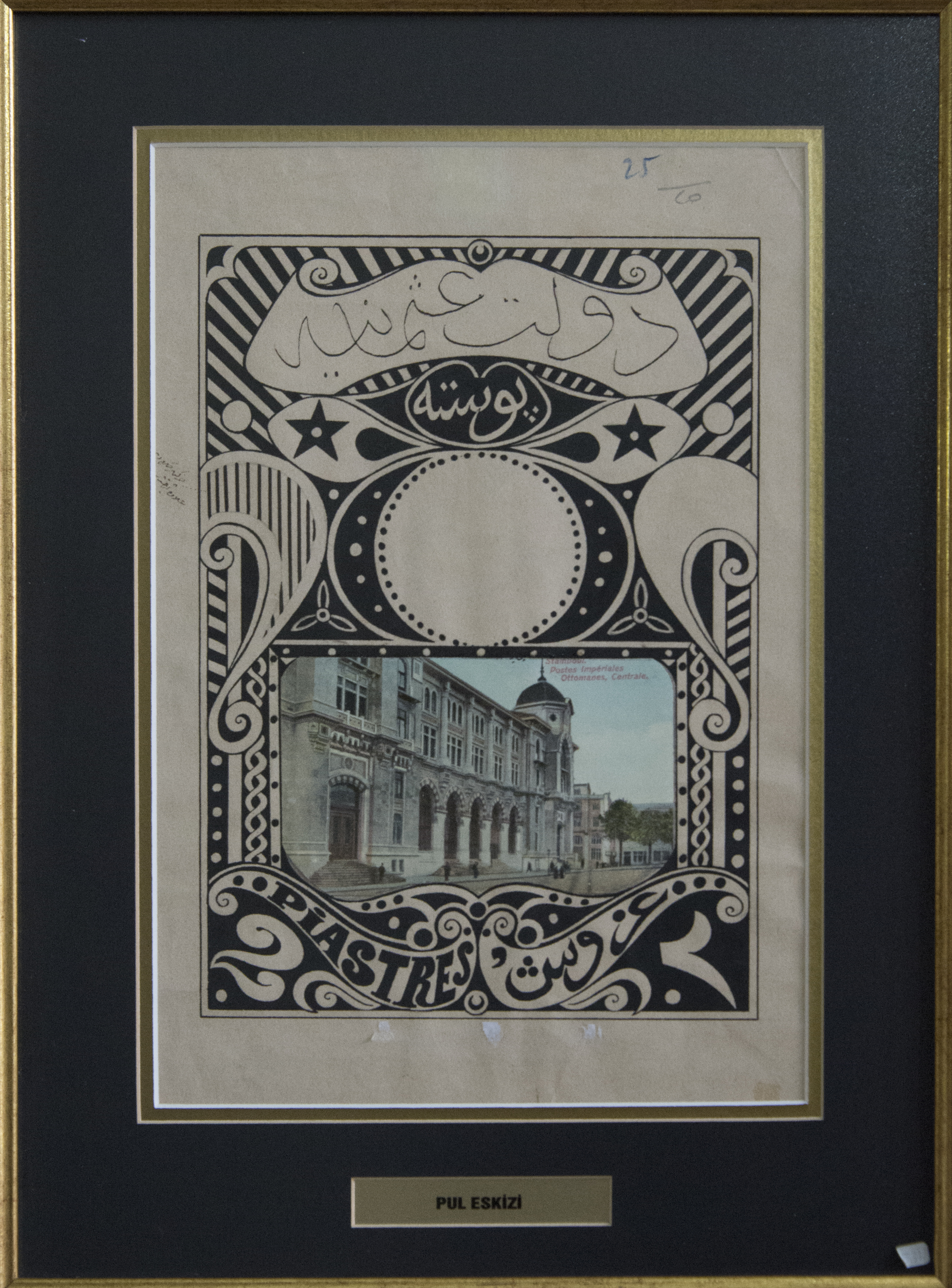
Istanbul Postal Museum

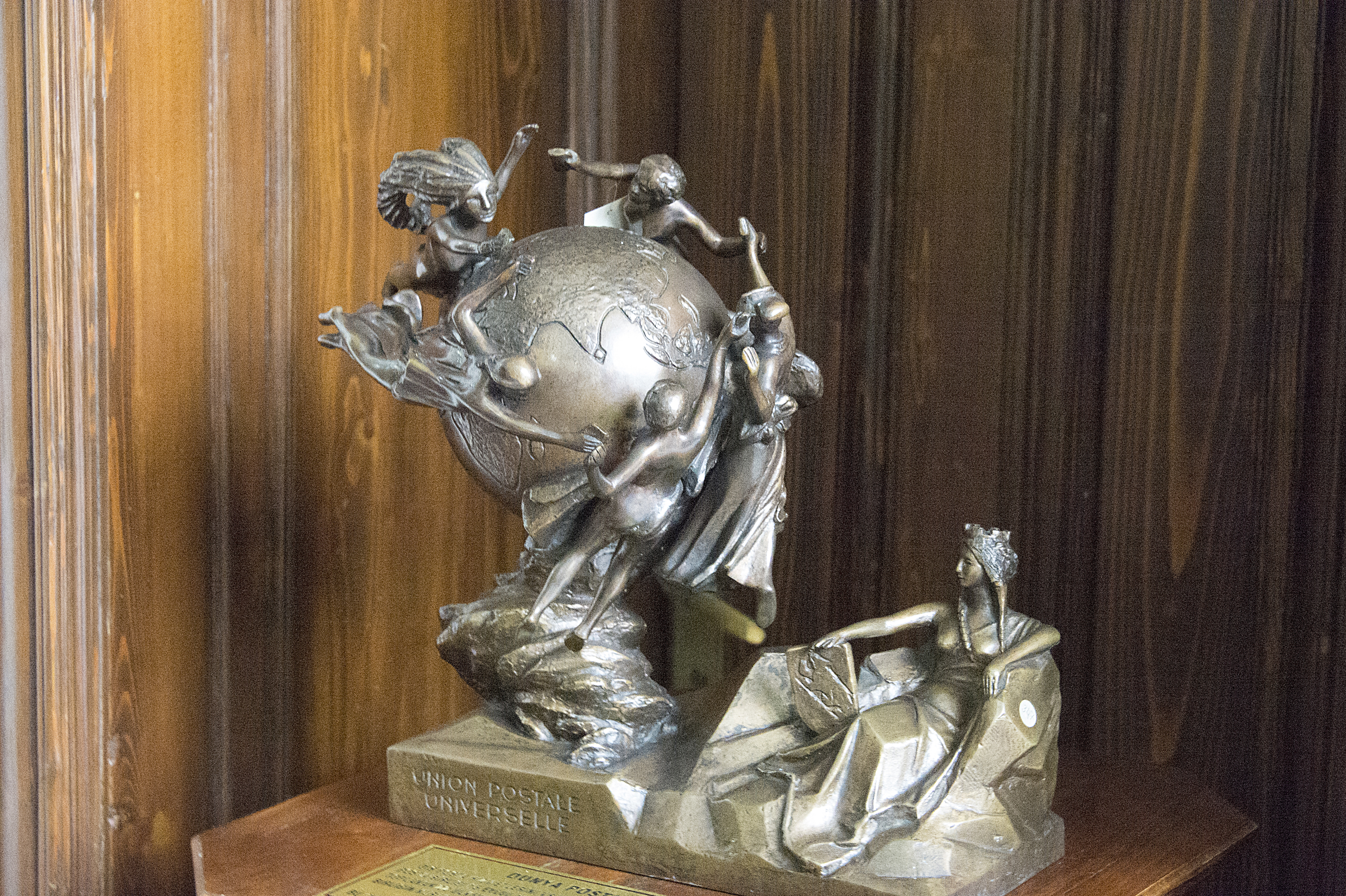
Istanbul Postal Museum Postal globe

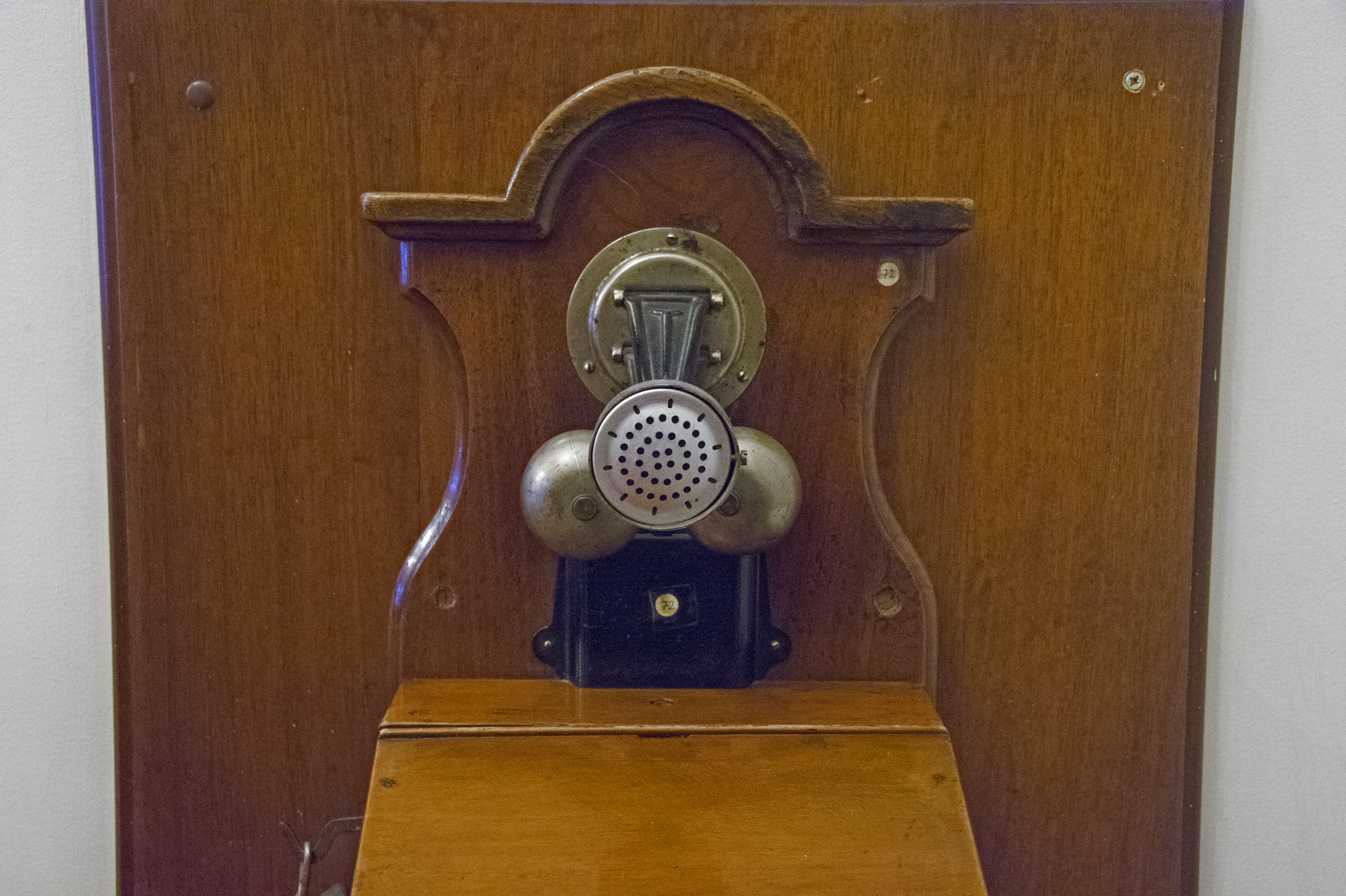
Istanbul Postal Museum Telephone

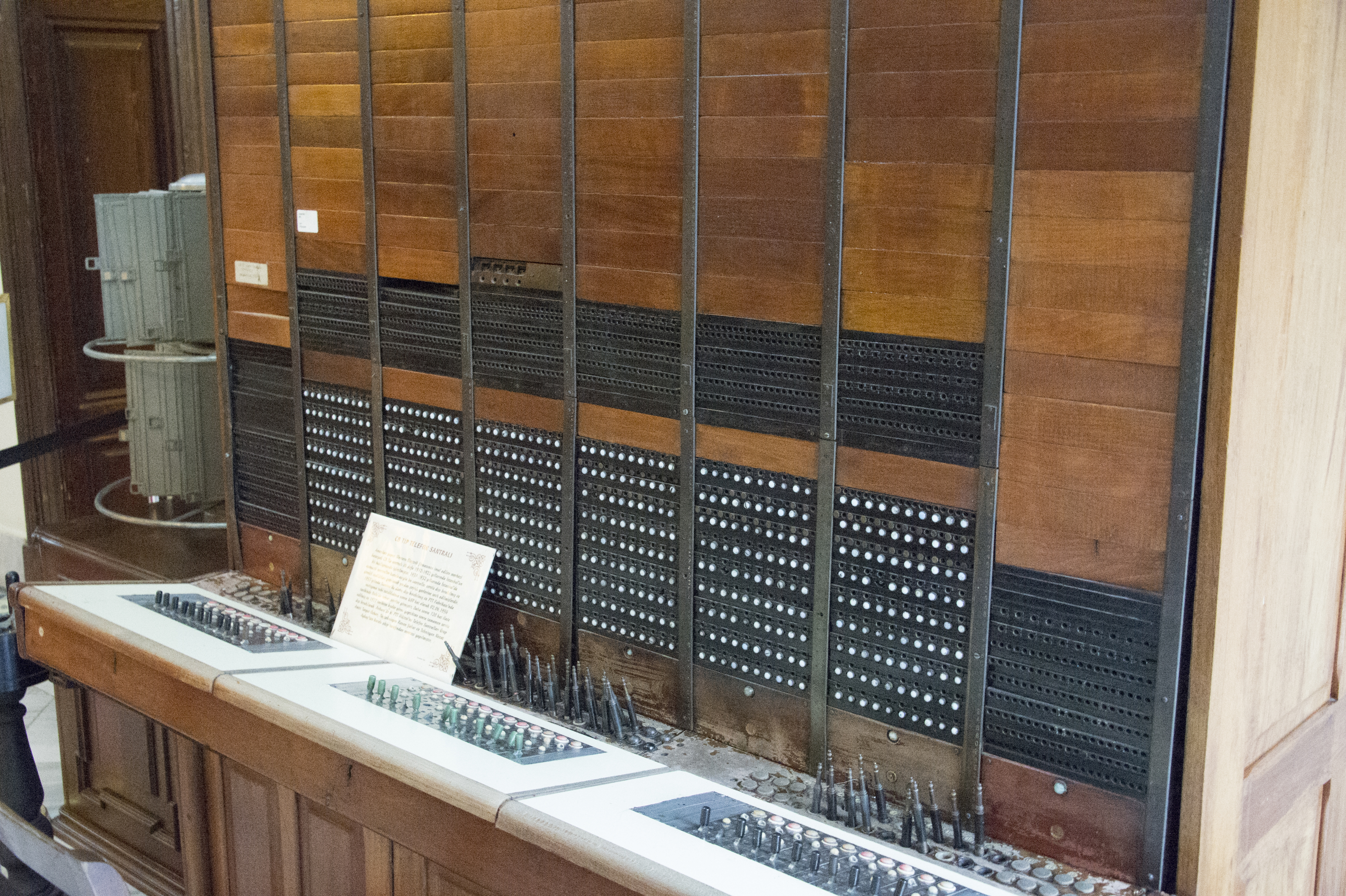
Istanbul Postal Museum Switchboard

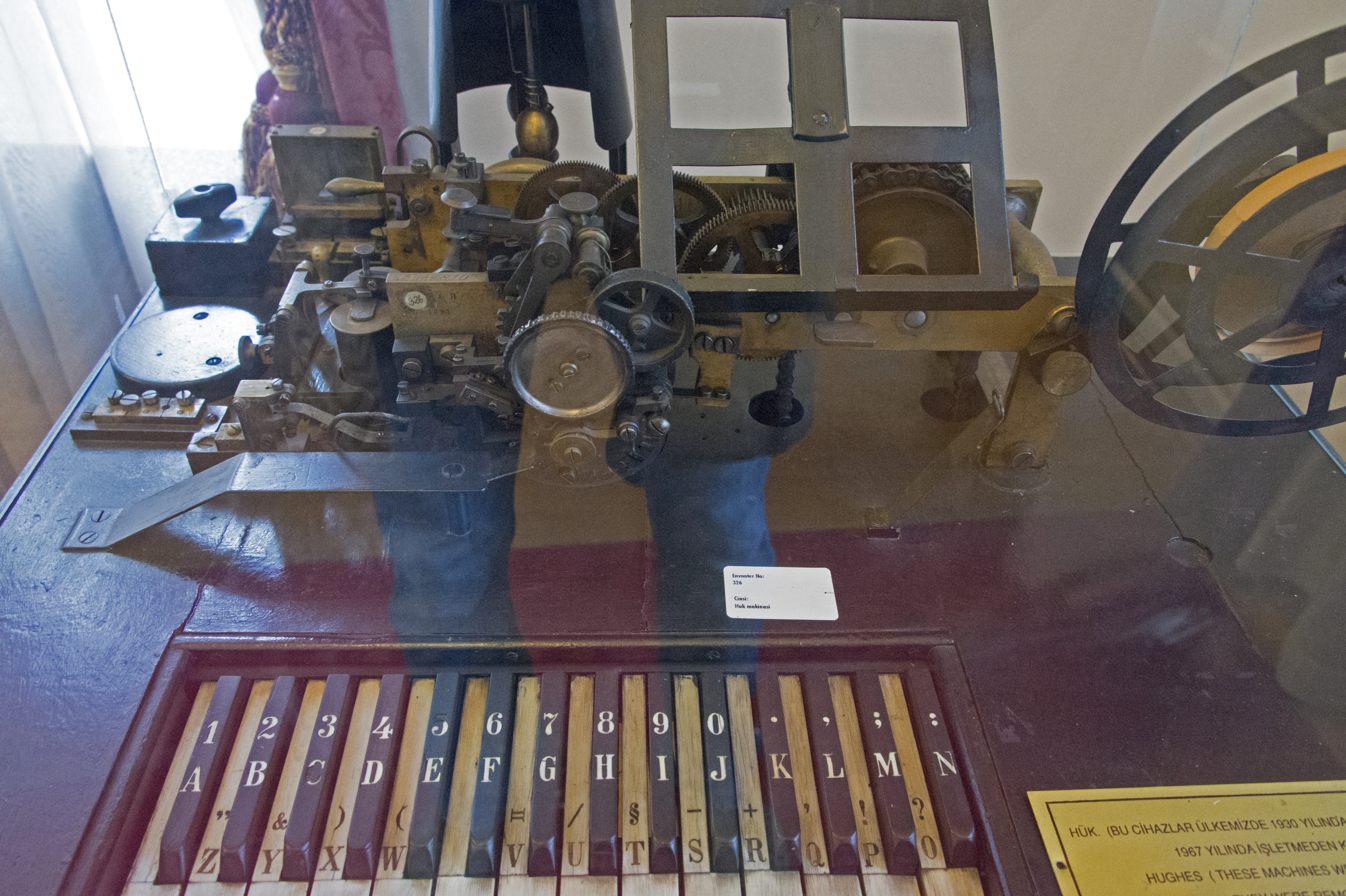
Istanbul Postal Museum Telegraph

== See also ==
- Postage stamps and postal history of Turkey
