= Clemens Holzmeister =

Austrian architect and stage designer

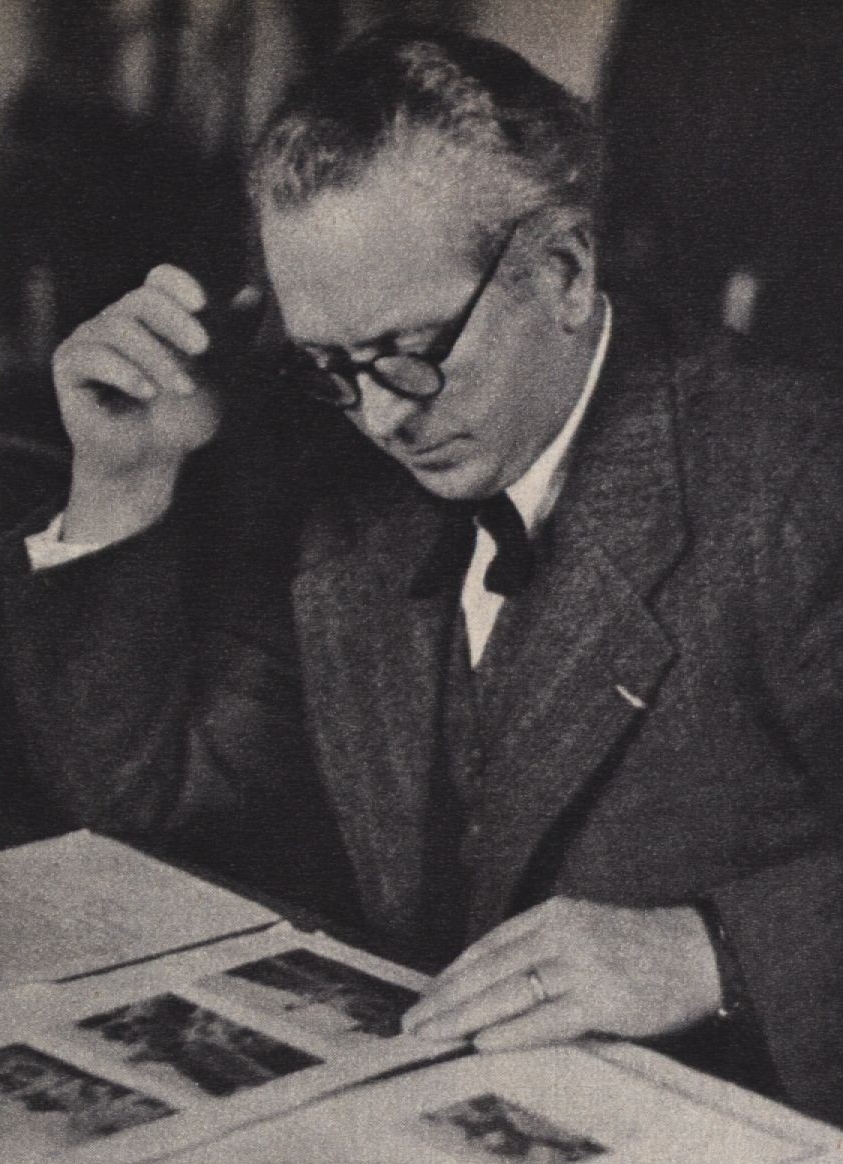
Photo of Clemens Holzmeister

Clemens Holzmeister (27 March 1886 – 12 June 1983) was a prominent Austrian architect and stage designer of the early twentieth century. The Austrian Academy of Fine Arts listed his life's work as containing 673 projects. He was the father of Judith Holzmeister.

== Biography ==
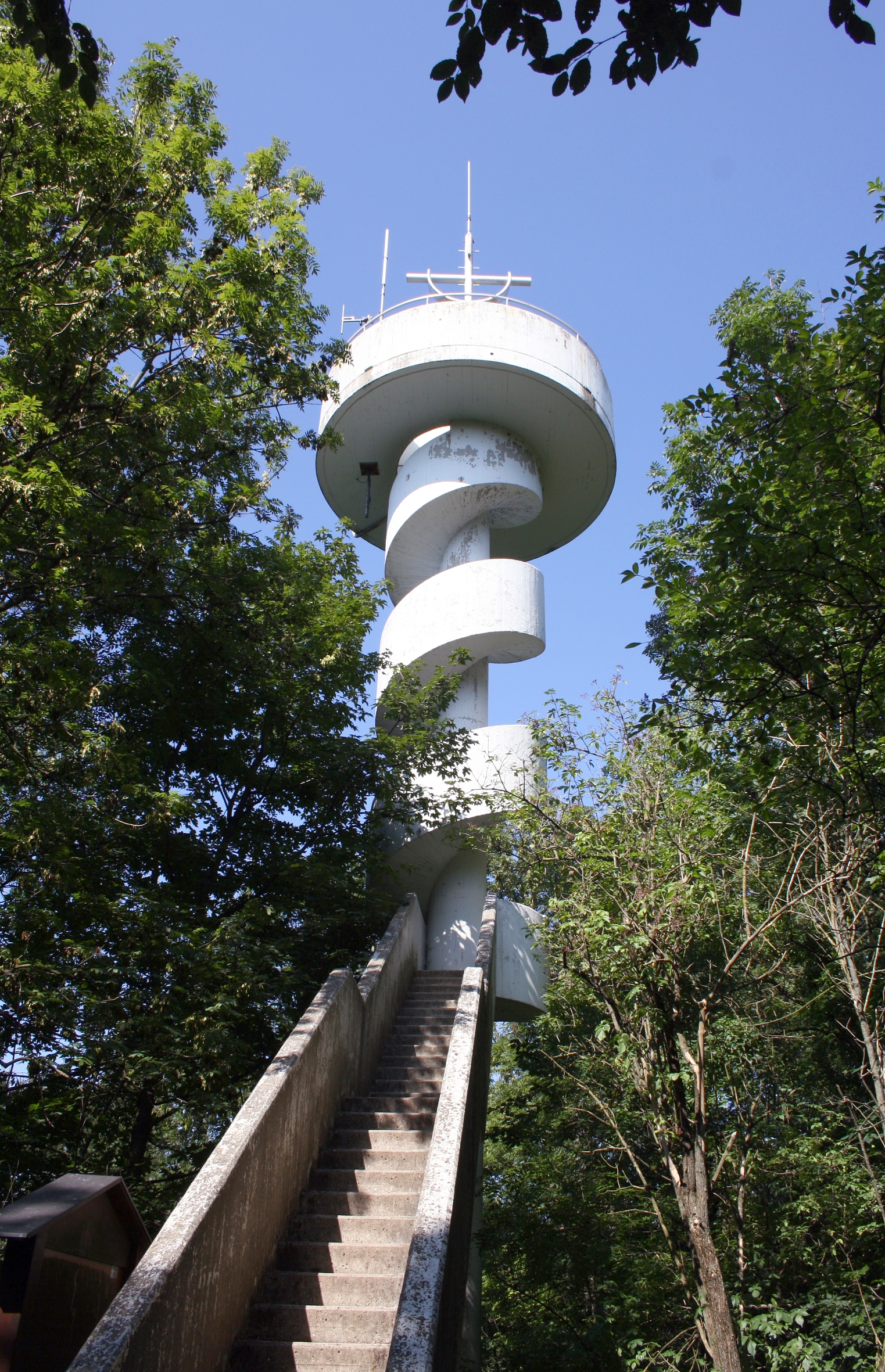
The Leopold-Figl-Warte, one of his works.

Holzmeister was born in the village of Fulpmes in the Tyrol state of Austria. He and Judith Bridarolli married in 1913 in Innsbruck. In 1914 His son Guido was born in Vienna. He attended the Vienna University of Technology and earned a doctorate in architecture in 1919. His daughter Judith Holzmeister was born in Innsbruck in 1920. After submitting a prize-winning design, he became the Head of the Architecture Department of Austria's Academy of Fine Arts in 1924. In 1926 he oversaw the remodelling of the Festival Theatre in Salzburg, then spent several years erecting government buildings in Ankara, Turkey.

In 1931 Holzmeister became the Director of the Austrian Academy of Fine Arts. Besides building projects in Austria, Germany and Turkey, he remained the Director of the Academy until being removed from this post during the Anschluss by the new German government in 1938. Although his offices, journals and papers were seized by the Nazis, he had the good luck to be in Turkey on another commission at the time; during which he designed the former Turkish Parliament building (1938) as well as numerous other state buildings. He remained in Turkey until 1954, then returned to Austria, where his 1950s commissions include the Großes Festspielhaus.

His body of work includes a large number of public and semi-public buildings and churches. He developed a new interpretation of local building traditions between simplicity and expressiveness. He also built monuments and scenery.

Holzmeister repeatedly worked as a stage designer beginning in the 1930s in collaboration with Max Reinhardt for whom he created the Faust-City for the Salzburg Festival. In the 1950s Holzmeister returned to stage design and again worked for the Salzburg Festival (Don Giovanni) as well as the Vienna State Opera (Fidelio, 1955, for the opening of the renovated State Opera) and the Burgtheater. Holzmeister's stage designs always respected the requirements of stage productions but never concealed the architectonic background of their creator.

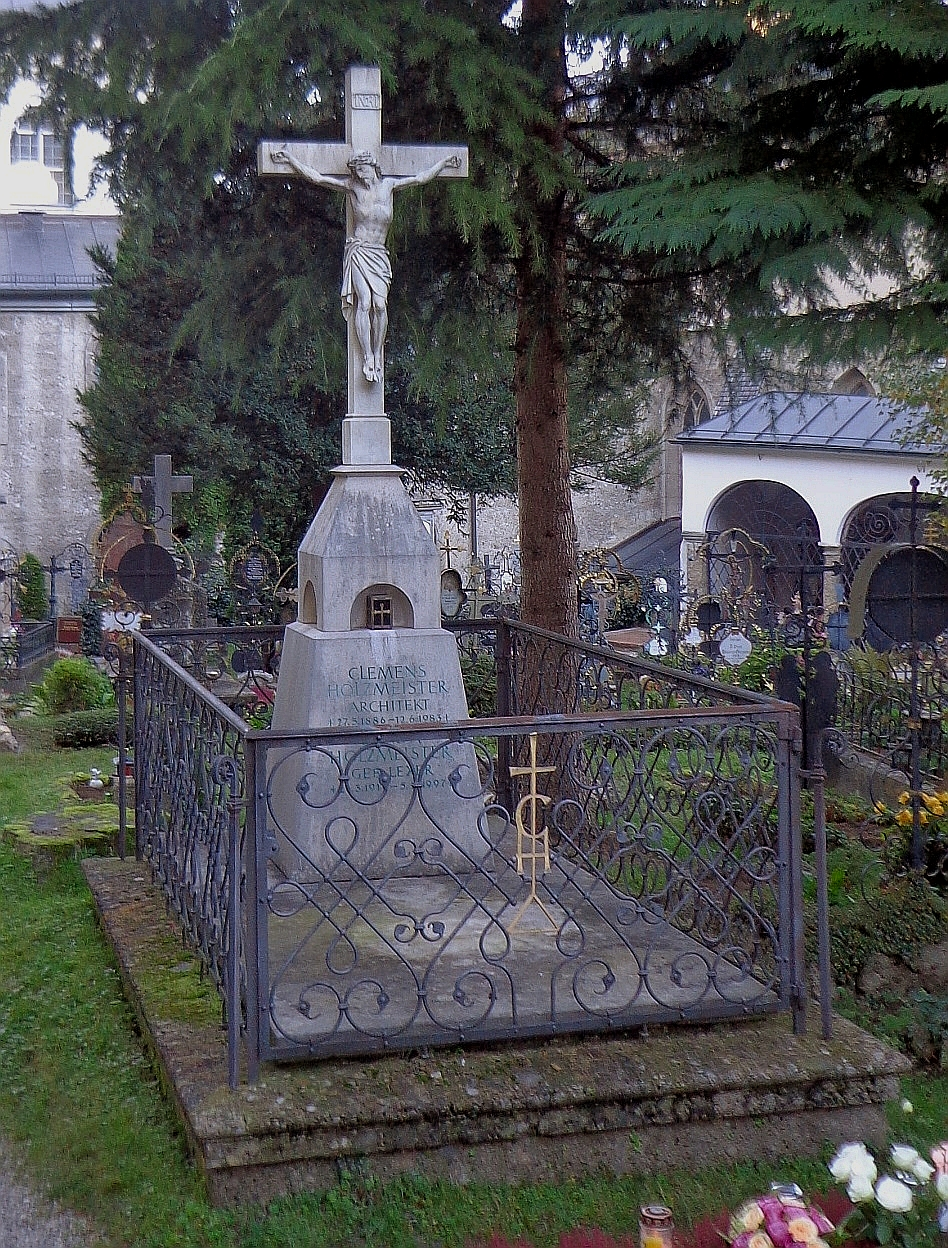
Grave of Clemens Holzmeister in Petersfriedhof Salzburg

He is buried in St. Peter's Cemetery in Salzburg.

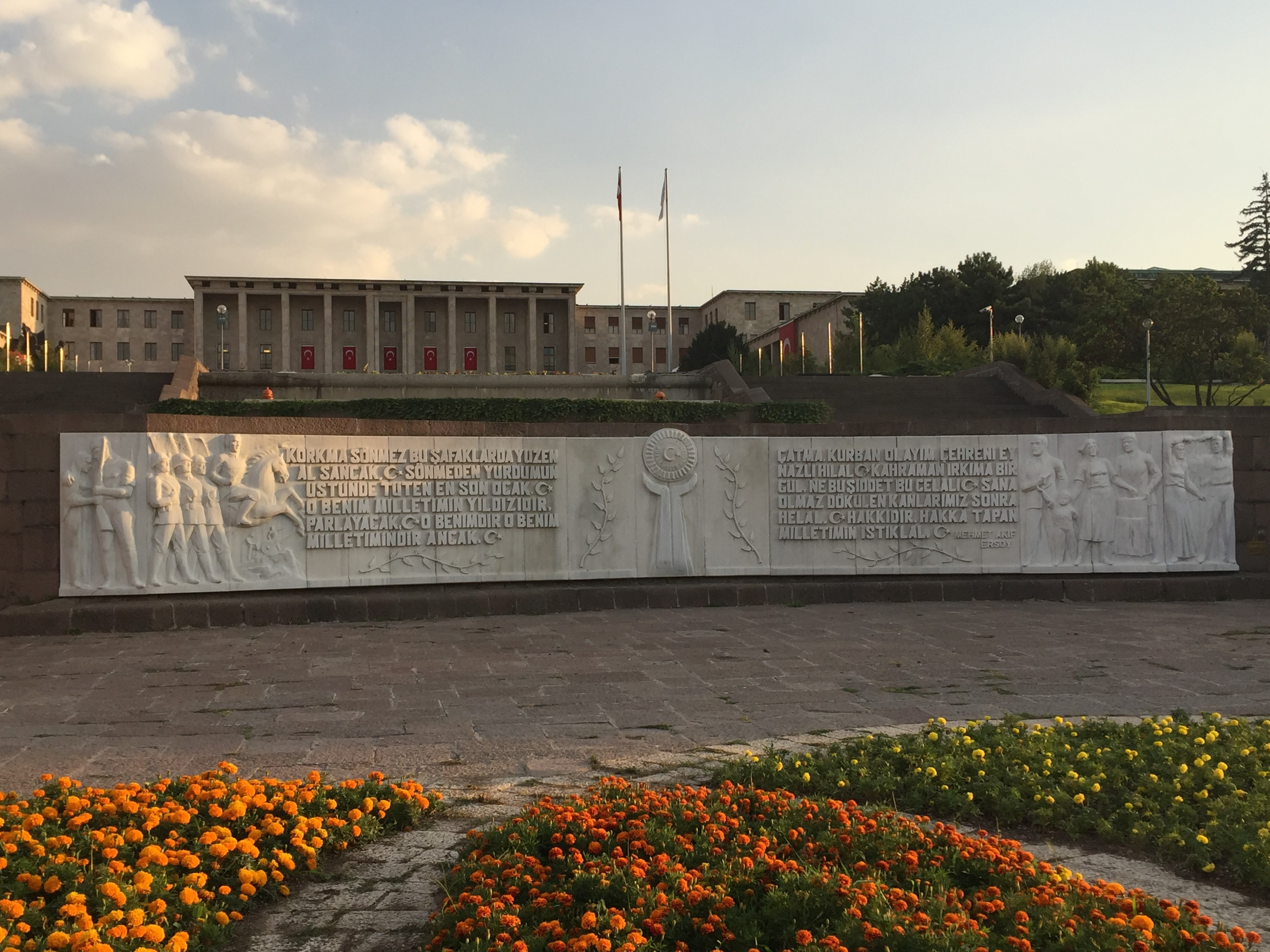
The third and current Grand National Assembly of Turkey building in Ankara was designed by Clemens Holzmeister in 1938.

== Honours and awards ==
- Grand Austrian State Prize for Architecture (June, 1953)
- Honorary Ring of Vienna (1955)
- Austrian Decoration for Science and Art (1957)
- Grand Decoration of Honour in Gold with Star for Services to the Republic of Austria (1981)
- Order of Merit of the Republic of Turkey (1990)

== Works ==
Sacred Buildings

- Parish Church of St. John the Baptist, Batschuns (1921-1923)
- Kloster Maria Hilf with the retreat house of the Missionaries of the Precious Blood in Kufstein (1923, 1928)
- Extensions of the parish church of Obergurgl in the municipality of Sölden (1924, 1966)
- Parish Mariahilf (Heldendankkirche) in Bregenz (1925-1931), Vorarlberg
- Parish church Crimea in Vienna Dobling (1931/32)
- Reconstruction and extension of the parish church Dornbach in Vienna Hernals (1931/32)
- Reconstruction and extension of the parish church of St. Anton am Arlberg (1932)
- Filialkirche Erlöserkirche in Wiener Neustadt; Reconstruction of a factory building to the Church (1932)
- Seipel-Dollfuss Memorial Church (now Christ the King Church) Neufünfhaus in Vienna (1933/34)
- Parish Church of St. Erhard, Mauer (Vienna) (1934–36)
- Christ Evangelical Church in Kitzbühel (1962)
- Parish Church of All Saints -St. George, Hoetting, Innsbruck (completed in 1964)
- Parish Pertisau, Tirol (1966-1970)
- Parish Don Bosco (Großfeldsiedlung) in Vienna Floridsdorf (1971 built)
- Guardian Angel Chapel (Schutzengel-Kapelle) in the Schlickeralm in the municipality of Telfes
- Parish Erpfendorf, Tirol
- Parish Bruckhäusl in Wörgl, Tirol
- Christ the King Church in Gloggnitz
- Mortuary Grafstein (Carinthia) (1965)
- Church of St. Stephan in Gmünd (Lower Austria), 1981-1982 Expansion
- Parish church in Zwölfaxing (1966-1967)
- Filialkirche Holzhausen, community Sankt Georgen bei Salzburg, 1985 Extension

Civil Buildings

- Elementary school in Marbach an der Donau (debut)
- Feuerhalle Simmering in Vienna (1921–22)
- Sanatorium Mehrerau in Bregenz (1922-1923)
- Hotel Steinbock in Steinach am Brenner (built in 1923; demolished 1986)
- Council Blathof in Vienna (1924-1925)
- Hotel Post in St. Anton am Arlberg (1927/28)
- The Berghaus on the Hahnenkamm, Kitzbühel (1929/30)
- Cardinal Piffl dormitory of Akademikerhilfe in Vienna (1931/32)
- New spa / therapy center in Bad Ischl (1932, today: Euro Therme Bad Ischl )
- 2 houses in the Werkbundsiedlung Vienna (1932)
- Memorial at Fuschertörl, Grossglockner High Alpine Road (1933)
- Broadcasting House Argentinierstraße in Vienna (1935–39)
- Festspielhaus in Salzburg (1 reconstruction in 1926; 2 reconstruction 1936/38)
- State Theatre in Linz (1953-1958)
- Grosses Festspielhaus in Salzburg (1955-1960)
- Schülerheim Don Bosco in Fulpmes
- Leopold Figl waiting on Tulbingerkogel Lower Austria (1966–67; opened in 1968)
- Elementary school Grafstein (Carinthia) (1969/71)
- Elementary school Jenbach, Tirol
- Cultural Hall at the elementary school Himmelberg, Carinthia (1978/80)
- Andreas Hofer monument in Vienna-Wieden on Südtirolerplatz (design, executed by Jacob Adlhart)

Germany

Sacred Buildings

- Parish Church of St. Mary of the Assumption, Mary Green, Blankenese, 1929–30
- St. Hedwig's Cathedral, Berlin, expressionist remodeling of the interior of the episcopal church, (destroyed in war)
- Parish Church of St. Peter, Mönchengladbach -Waldhausen, 1933
- Church of St. Adalbert, Berlin-Mitte, 1933
- Parish Church of St. Agatha, Merchingen
- Catholic parish church of St. Martin, Nuremberg, 1934-1935, reconstruction after the planned by Rolf Behringer 1946-1948
- Christ the King Church in Kleve (1934), (destroyed in war in 1944)
- St. Mary Magdalene, Brotdorf
- Franciscan monastery, Hermes wedge
- Reconstruction in the Romanesque church of St. Georg (Cologne)
- Parish Church in Augsburg-Hochzoll, 1964–66

Civil Buildings

- Schlageter National Monument, Dusseldorf-Golzheim, 1931

Italy

- Hotel Drei Zinnen, Sexten, 1929-1931
- Hotel Adler, St. Ortisei, 1926
- Villa Dr. Runggaldier, Ortisei, 1926
- Villa Pretz, Bolzano, 1926-1928
- Settlement Klösterlegrund, Bolzano, 1925
- Reconstruction of the parish church of San Vigilio, Untermais, Merano

Turkey

- Ministry of Defence 1928
- The Office of Commander in Chief 1929-1930
- Ankara Officers’ Club 1930-1933
- War Academy 1930-1935
- Çankaya Mansion 1931-1932
- Central Bank 1931-1933
- Ministry of Interior 1932-1934
- Court of Appeal 1933-1934
- Property Credit Bank 1933-1934
- Embassy of Austria 1935-1936
- Turkish Grand National Assembly 1938-1960
