= Stamp Museum =

Museum in Ankara, Turkey

- PTT Pul Müzesi
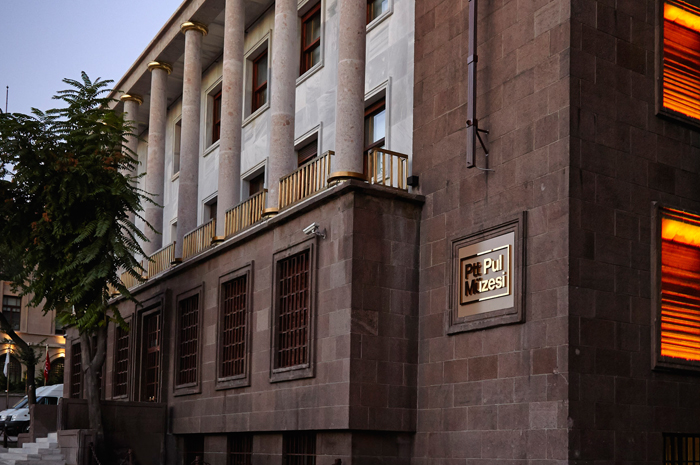
- Stamp Museum

- Stamp Museum
- Established: 2013; 13 years ago
- Location: Atatürk Bulvarı No: 13 Ulus / Ankara
- Coordinates: 39°56′18″N 32°51′15″E
- Type: Postage stamp
- Collections: Ottoman Empire, Turkish Republic, Other countries
- Owner: Turkish PTT
- Website: Stamp Museum

The Stamp Museum (Turkish: Pul Müzesi) is a museum in Ankara, Turkey.

== The building ==
The museum is in Ulus neighborhood of Ankara at 39°56′18″N 32°51′15″E. The museum building was the headquarters of a former bank named Emlak ve Eytam Bank. It was planned by Clemens Holzmeister, the renown Austrian architect and was built in 1933-34 term. It is a five floor building with a total area of 6,500 square metres (70,000 sq ft). After the bank was merged to another bank in 1946 the building was handed over to Turkish PTT. In 2013 after renovation the building was opened to public as a stamp museum.

== Collections ==
The Turkish and the Ottoman as well as some foreign postage stamps are displayed in the museum.There are also thematic collections shown below:

Cultural heritage
Atatürk (founder of Turkey)
Vehicles
Sports
Nature
Tourism
