= Sirkeci =

Neighborhood in western Istanbul

Coordinates: 41°00′53″N 28°58′32″E

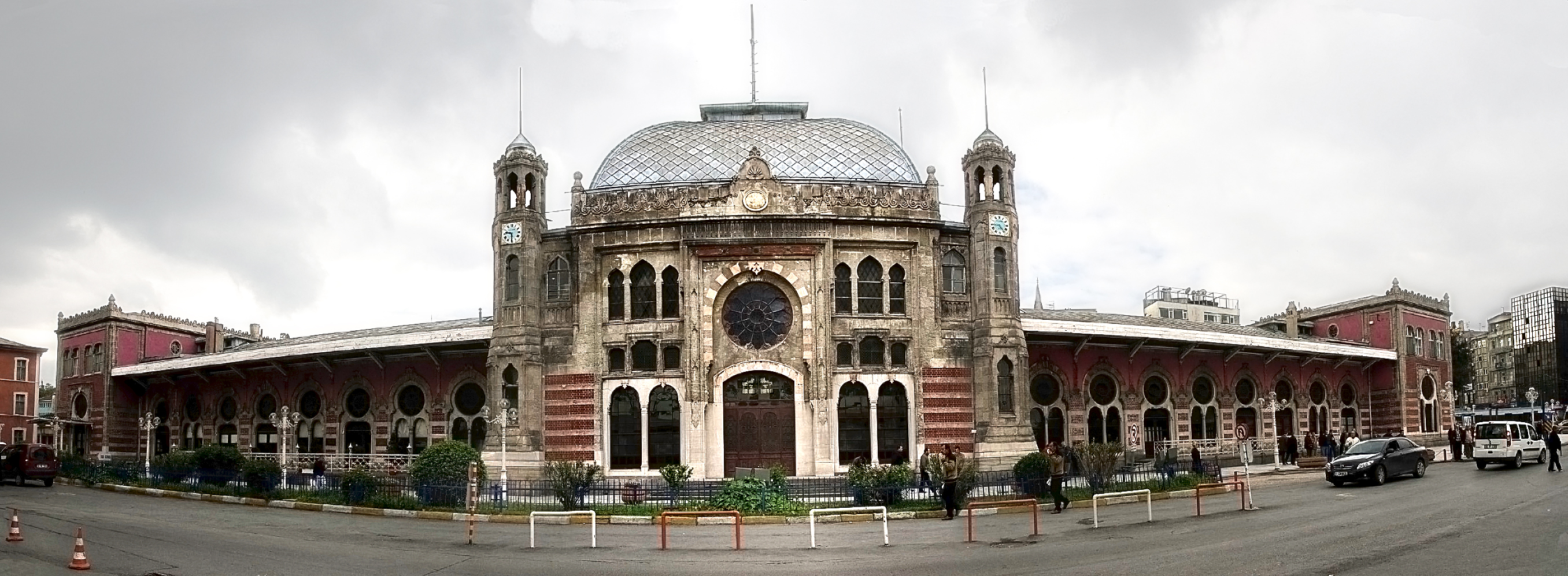
Sirkeci railway station in Istanbul was the eastern terminus of the famous Orient Express which operated between Paris and Istanbul from 1883 to 2009. Designed by German architect August Jasmund, the current terminal building was constructed between 1888 and 1890.

Sirkeci (pronounced [ˈsiɾkedʒi]) is a neighborhood in the Eminönü quarter of the Fatih district in Istanbul, Turkey. In the Byzantine period, the area was known as Prosphorion (Ancient Greek: Προσφόριον).

The neighborhood borders to the north the mouth of the Golden Horn, to the west the neighborhood of Bahçekapı, to the east the Topkapı Palace area, and to the south the Cağaloğlu neighborhood. It hosts the Sirkeci railway station, the easternmost terminus of the Orient Express, a historic long-distance passenger train service in Europe that operated between Paris and Istanbul in the period between 1883 and 2009.

The neighborhood consists mostly of commercial and tourist-oriented buildings. A combination of small shops, hans (larger workshops) and offices intermingle with boutique hotels, traditional Turkish restaurants, Turkish and foreign-language bookstores, and tourist offices.

== Accommodation ==
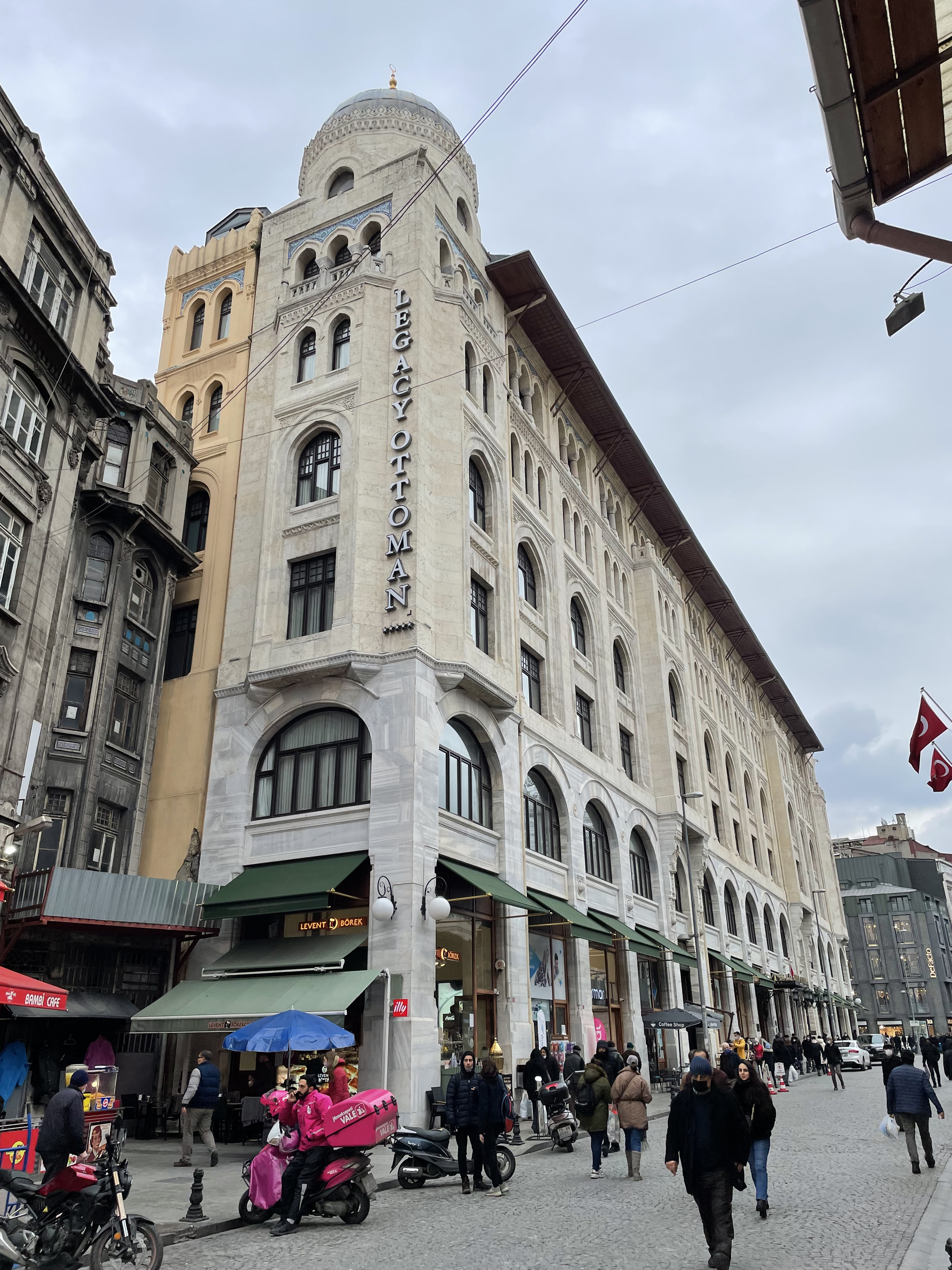
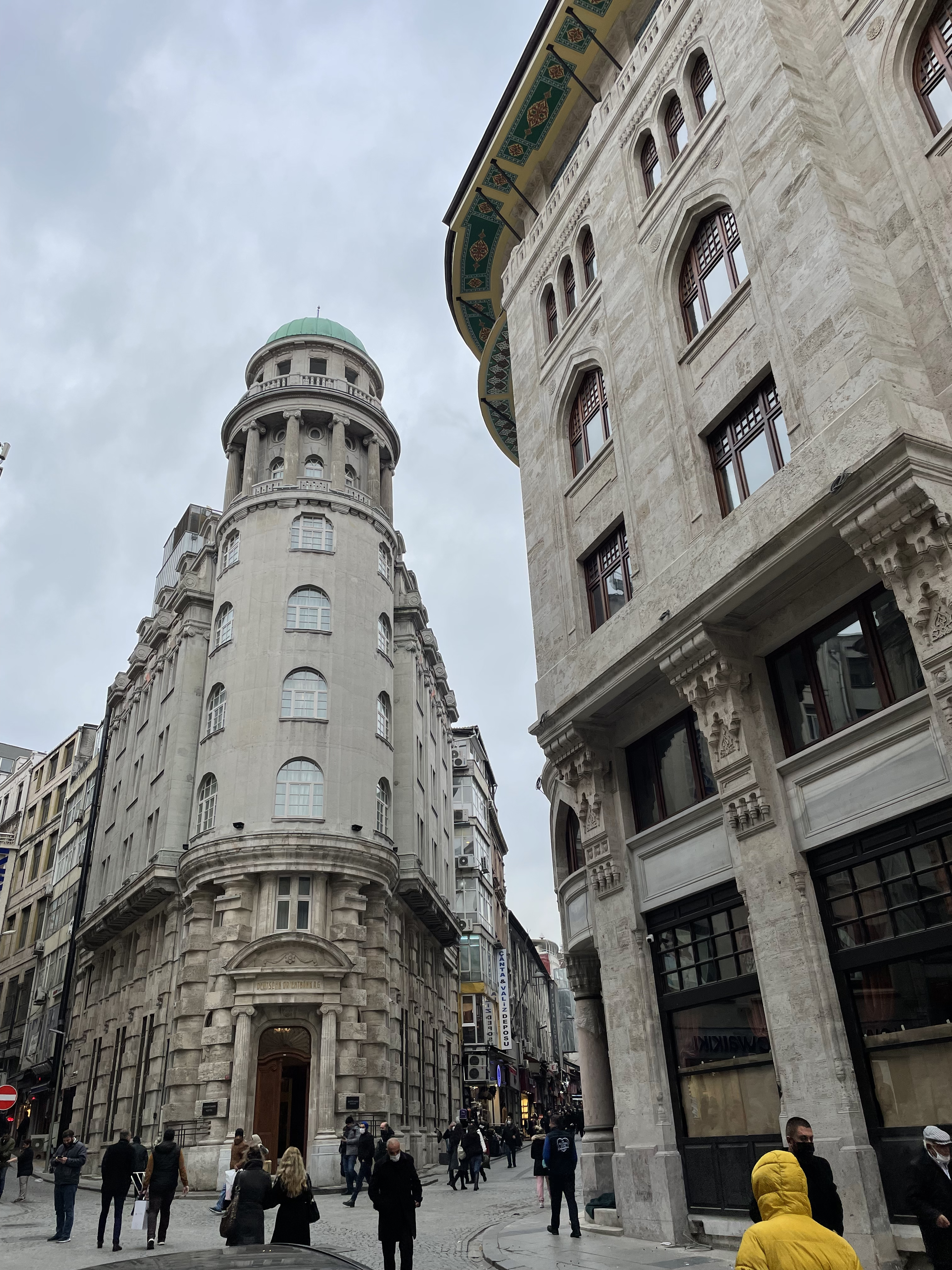
4th Vakıf Han (today the Legacy Ottoman Hotel) designed by Mimar Kemaleddin Bey (left) and Deutsche Orientbank (also known as Germania Han, today the Orientbank Hotel) designed by August Jasmund (right) in Sirkeci, Istanbul.

In recent years, Sirkeci has become one of the major hotel neighborhoods in the historical peninsula of Istanbul, located between the Beyoğlu district and Sultanahmet quarter.

== Transportation ==
Famous for its railway station which was the eastern terminus of the Orient Express, Sirkeci remains one of the main travel hubs for Istanbul, connecting suburban train, tram and ferry systems. The Sirkeci Station of the Turkish State Railways is the terminating node of the European railway network leading into Istanbul from Bucharest, Romania.

Sirkeci is a station on the Marmaray railway line running between Gebze and Halkalı, and connecting the European and Asian sides of Istanbul via a tunnel under the Bosphorus.

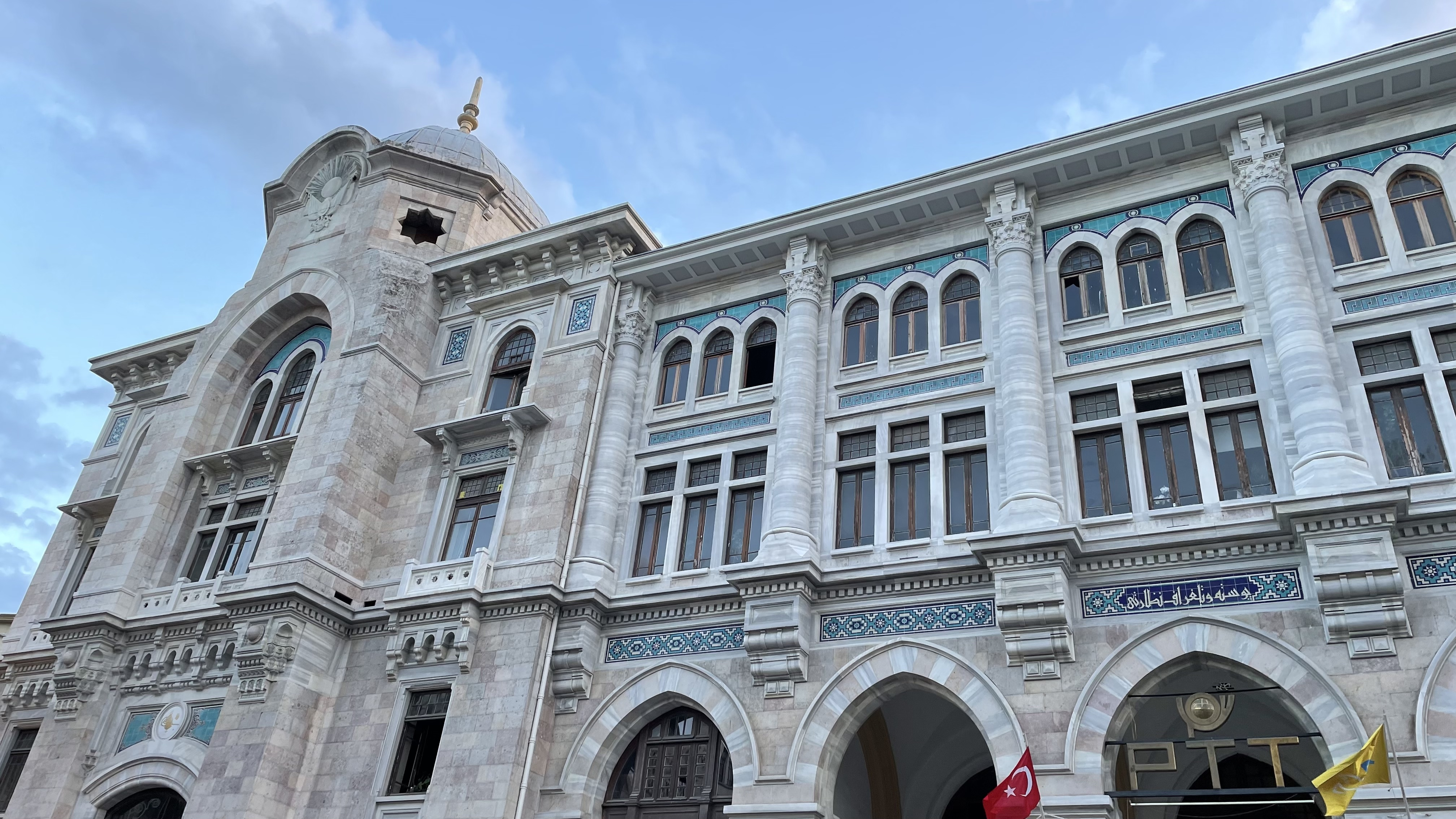
The Grand Post Office in Sirkeci, designed by Vedat Tek in the Turkish neoclassical style of the early 20th century.

Sirkeci Marmaray station tiles

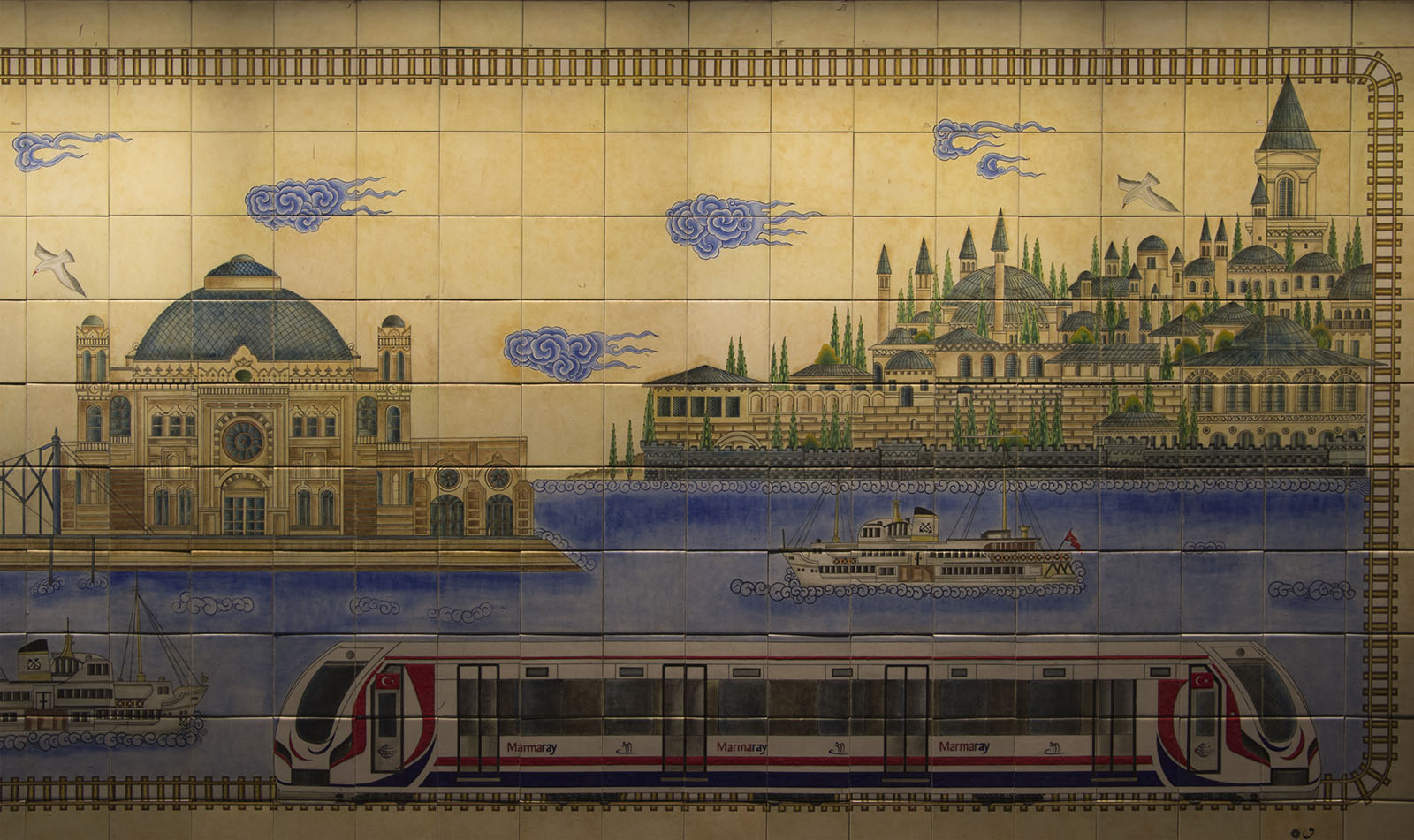

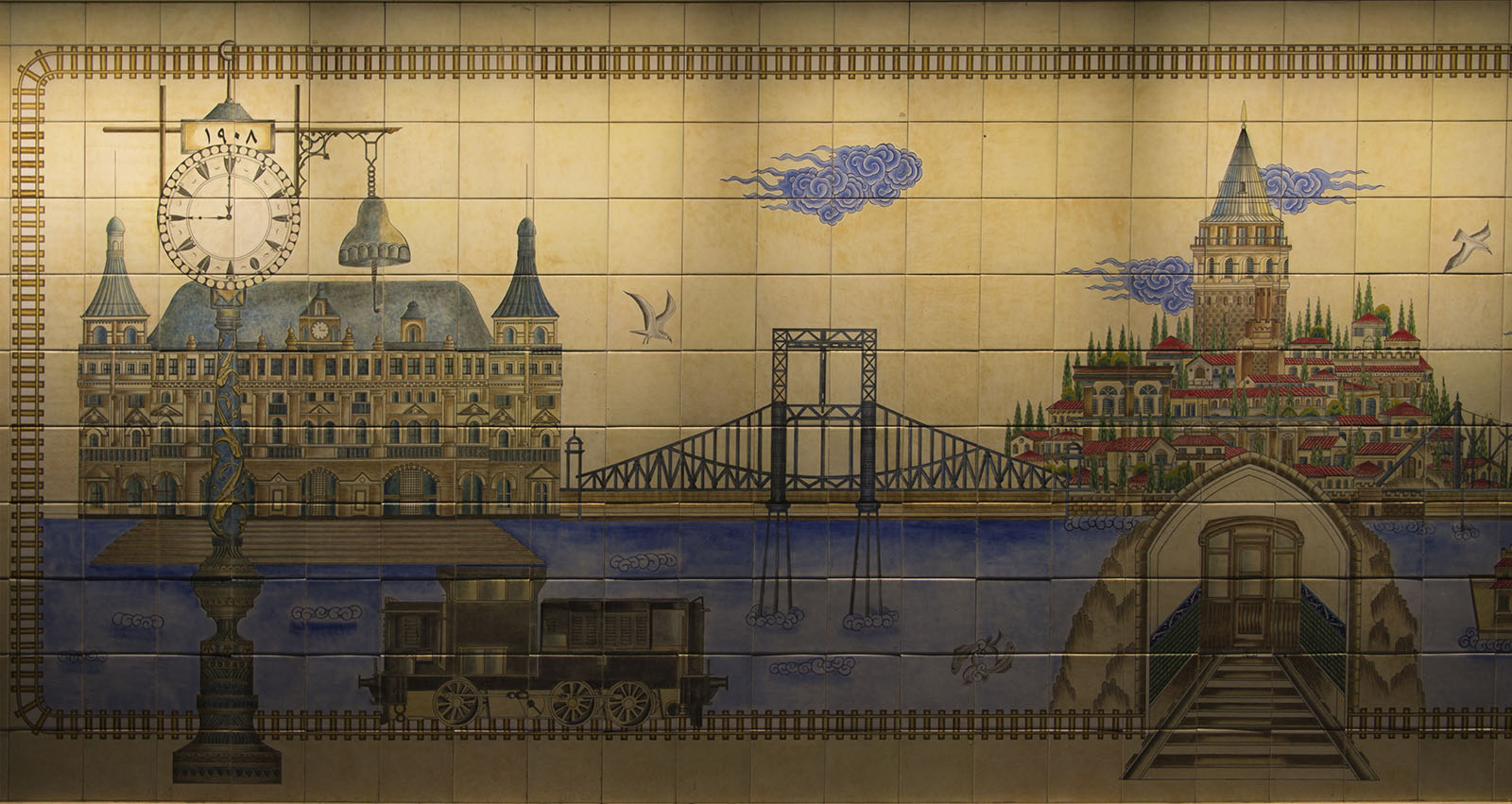

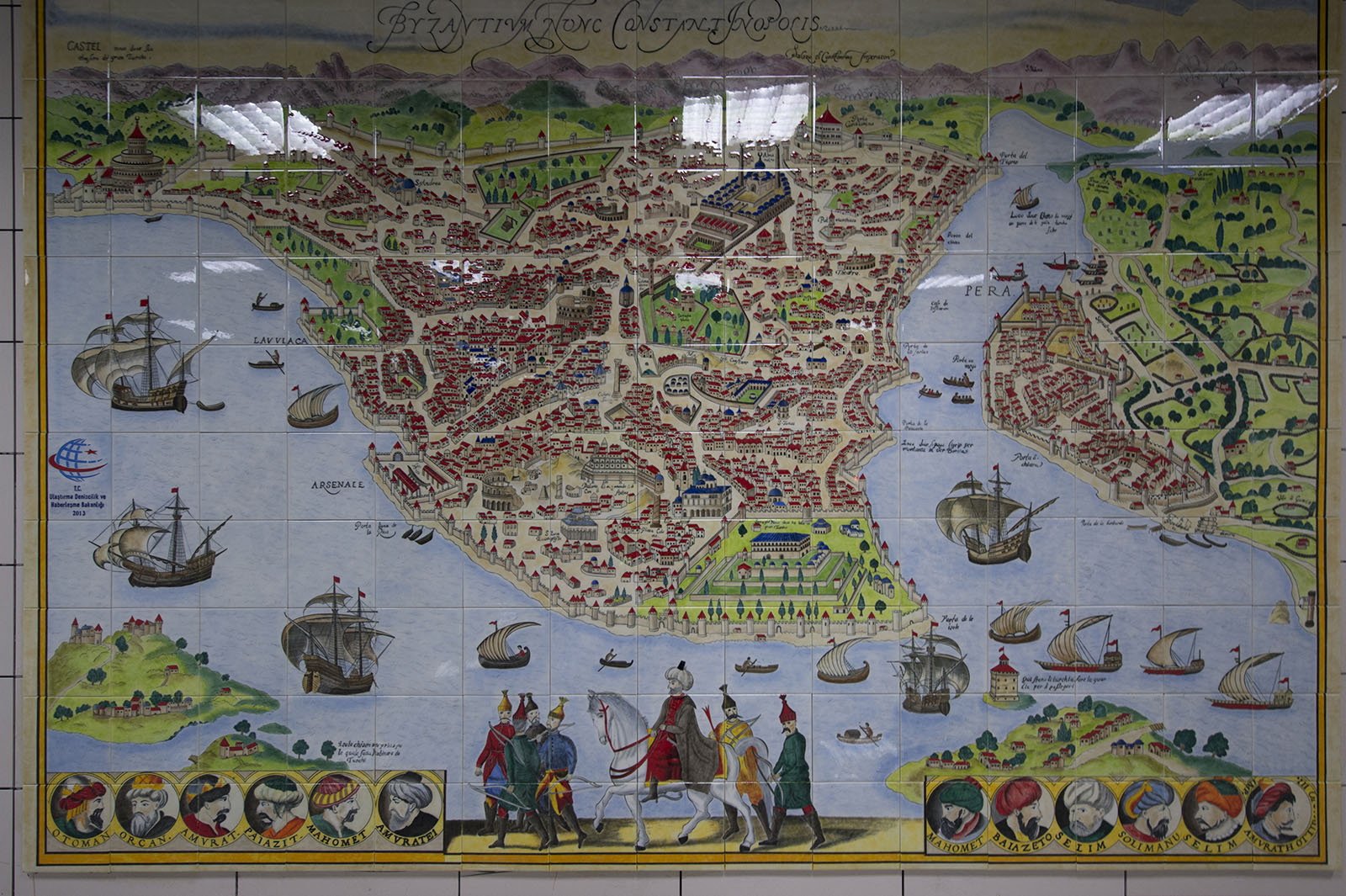

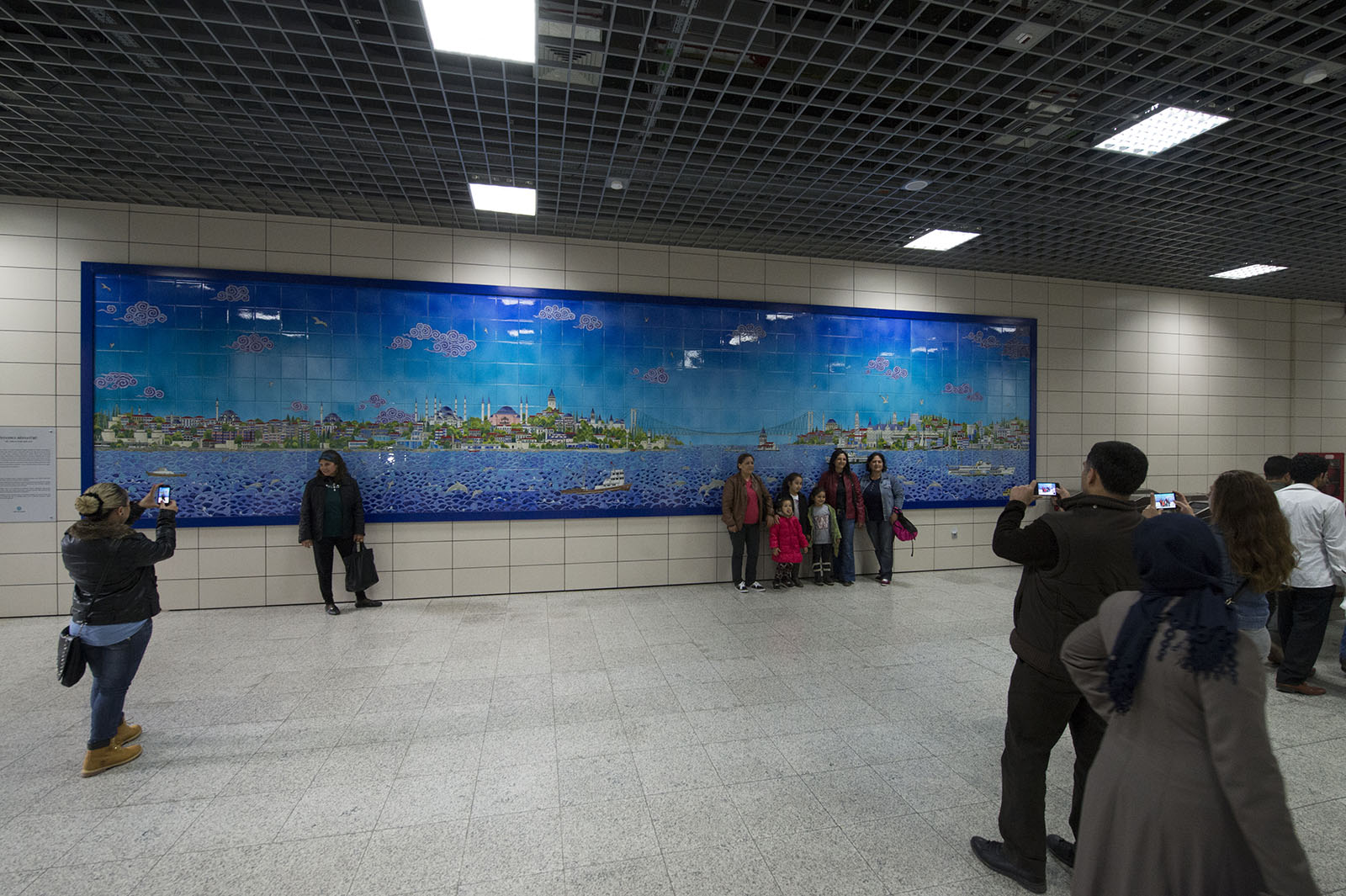

== See also ==
- Eminönü
- Sirkeci Terminal
- Marmaray
- Istanbul Metro
- Grand Post Office
- Istanbul Postal Museum

== Sources ==
- Janin, Raymond (1964). Constantinople Byzantine (in French) (2 ed.). Paris: Institut Français d'Etudes Byzantines.
- Müller-Wiener, Wolfgang (1977). Bildlexikon zur Topographie Istanbuls: Byzantion, Konstantinupolis, Istanbul bis zum Beginn d. 17 Jh (in German). Tübingen: Wasmuth. ISBN 978-3-8030-1022-3.
