= PTT (Turkey) =

National post and telegraph agency of Turkey

Ptt

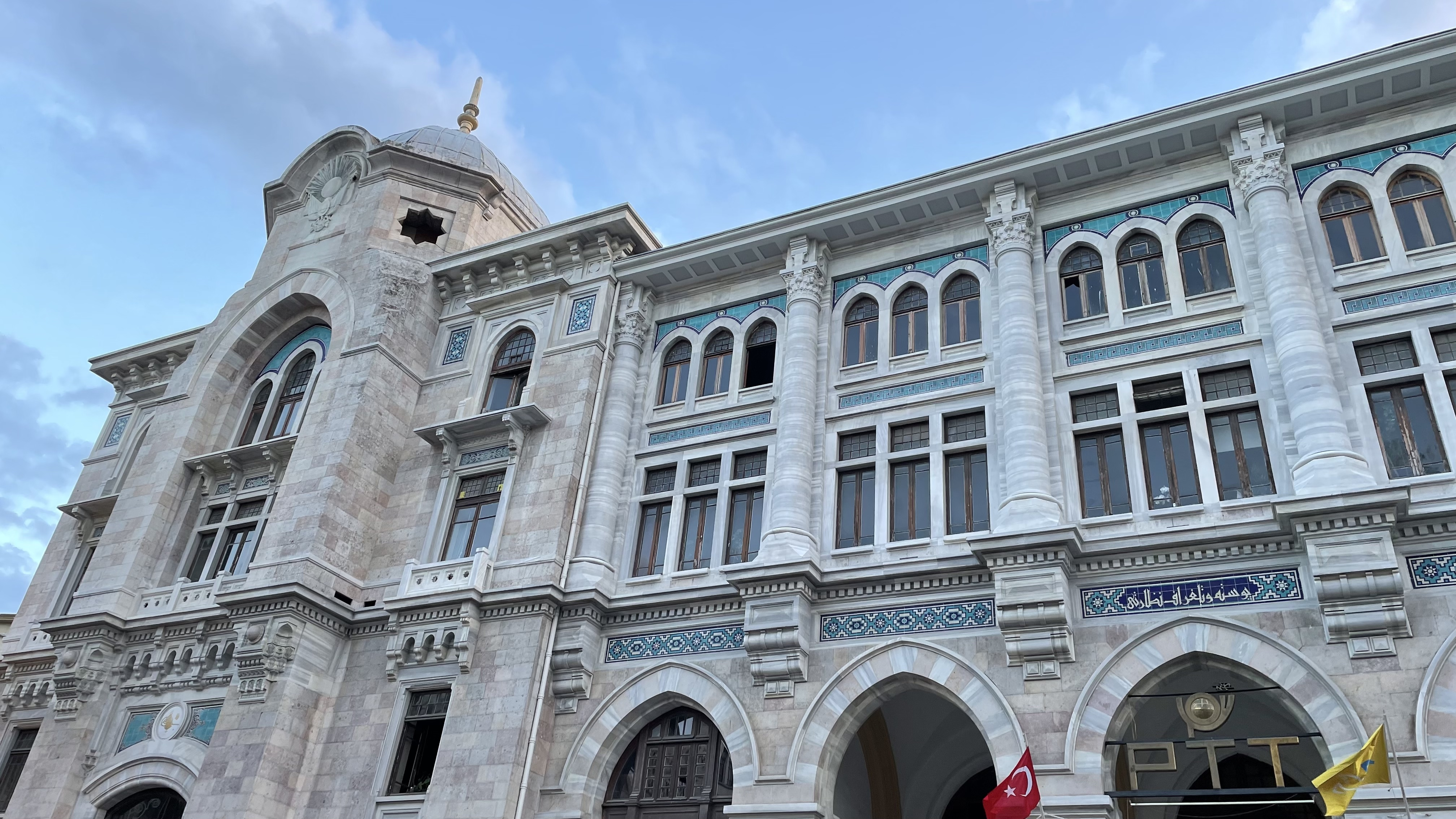
- The Grand Post Office building in Istanbul.
- Industry: Postal services Banking; Logistics
- Founded: 23 October 1840; 185 years ago
- Headquarters: Ankara, Turkey
- Key people: Hakan Gülten (General Manager) Abdulkadir Uraloğlu (Minister of Transport and Infrastructure)
- Net income: ₺361 million (2021); ₺741 million (2020)
- Owner: Turkey Wealth Fund
- Website: www.ptt.gov.tr

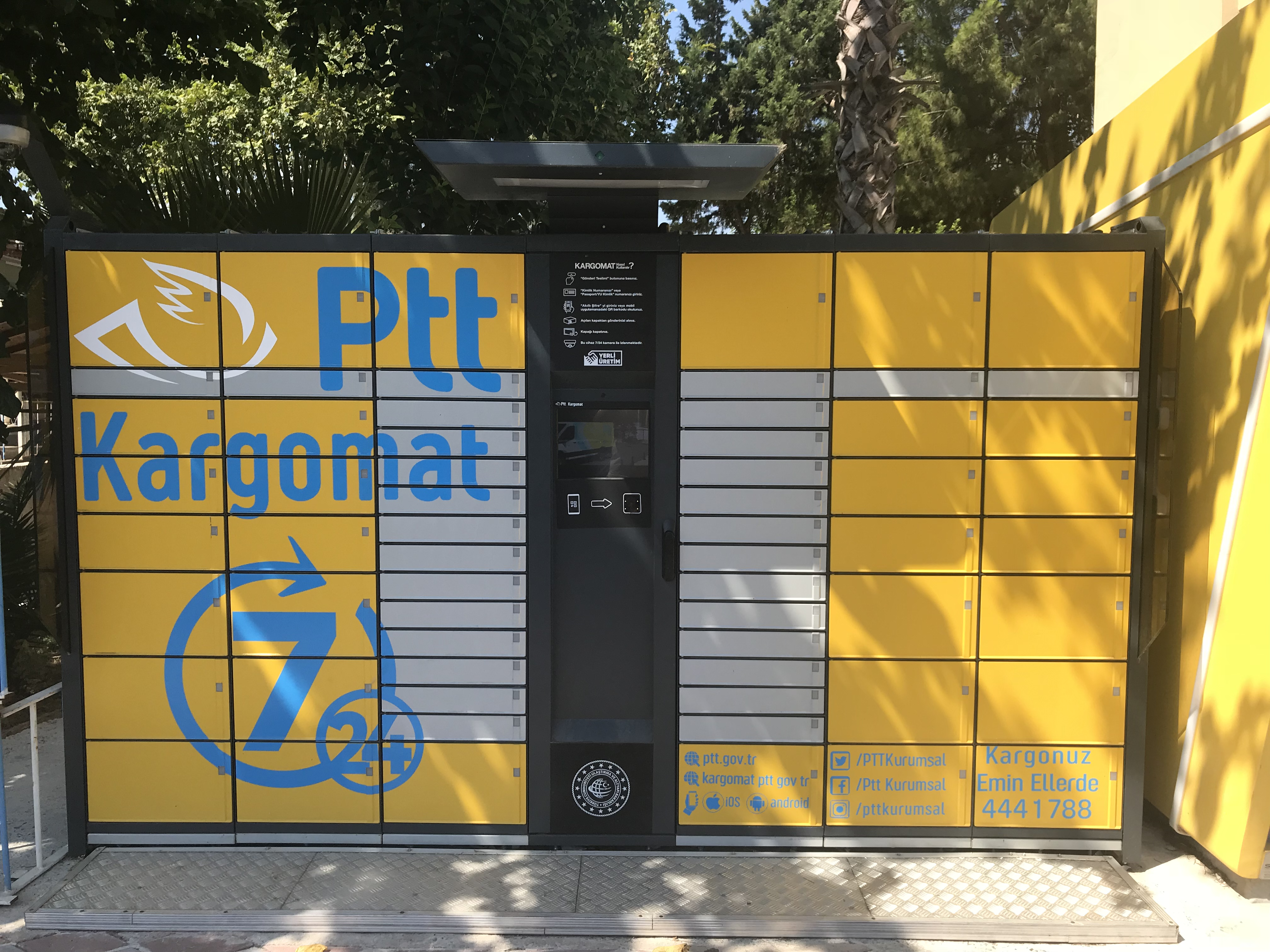
A PTT Kargomat parcel locker.

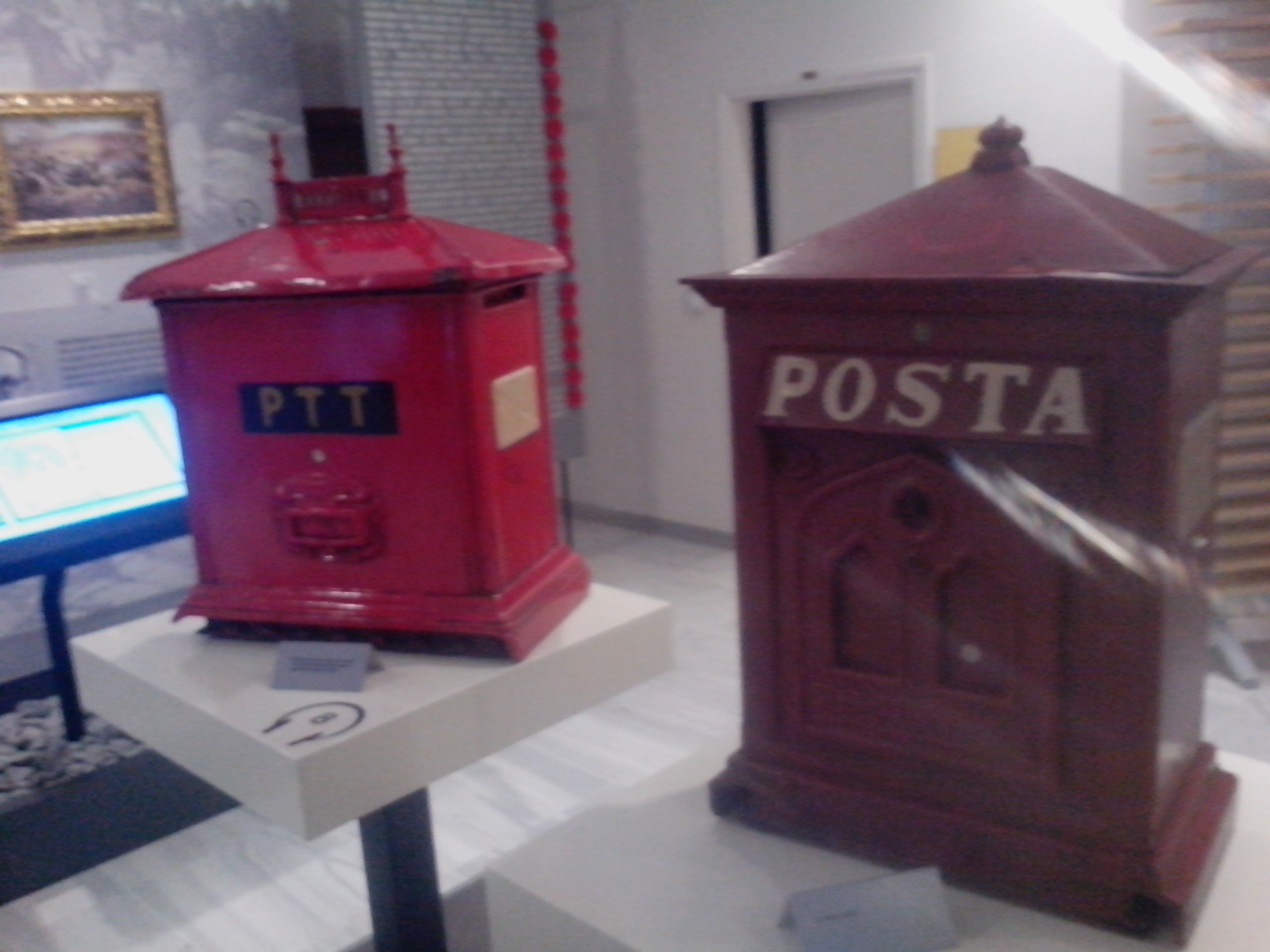
Mailboxes, used in 1940s by PTT, from PTT Museum- Ankara

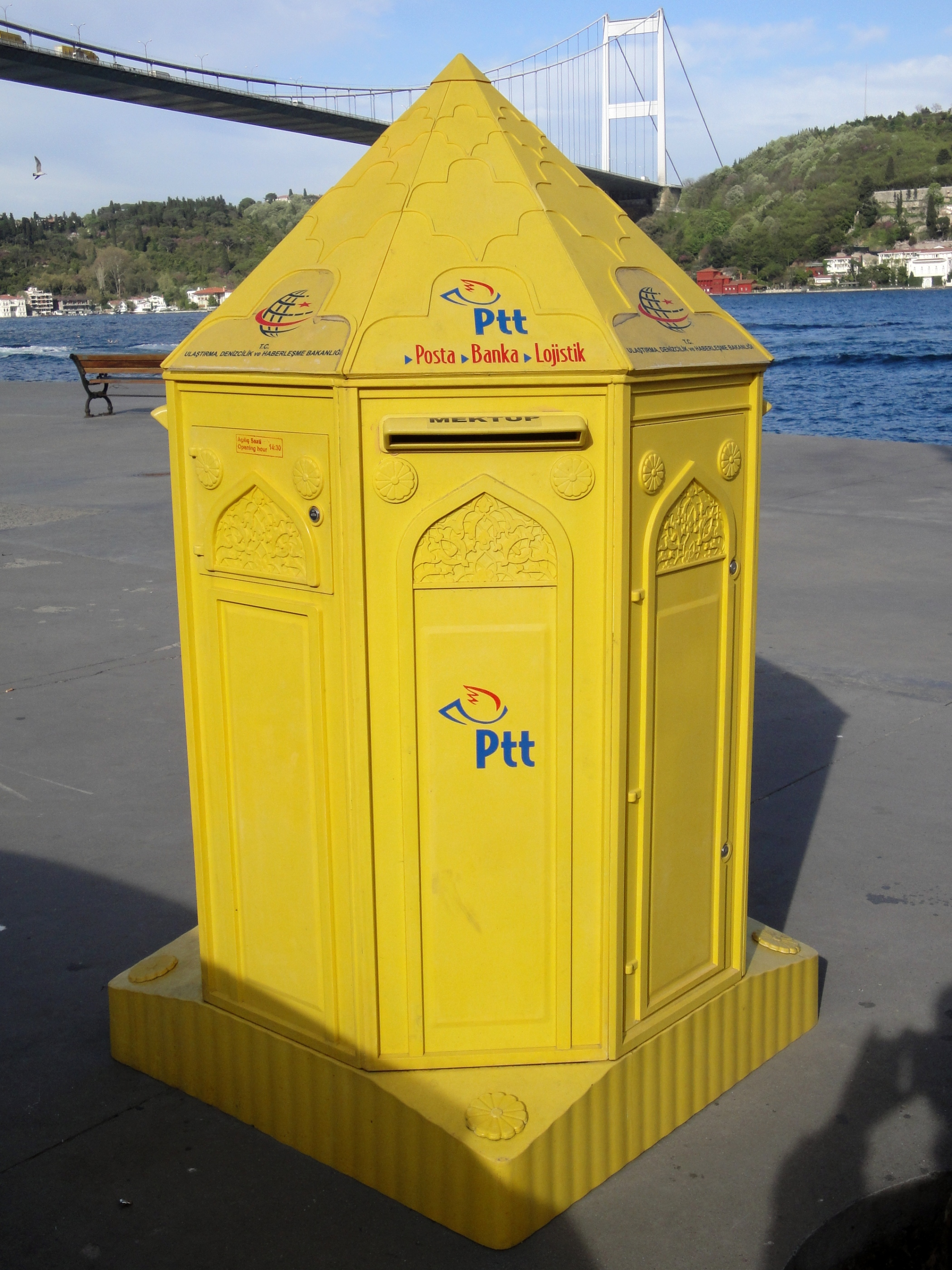
A modern PTT post box

PTT, an abbreviation for Posta ve Telgraf Teşkilatı (lit. Post and Telegraph Agency), is the national post and telegraph directorate of Turkey. Formerly, the organization was named Posta Telgraf Telefon. After the privatization of the telephone telecommunications service business, the directorate was renamed, keeping its acronym. It is headquartered in Ankara, and is known as Turkish Post internationally.

== History ==
On 23 October 1840, during the reign of Abdulmejid I, the Ottoman Ministry of Posts was established. In 1855, the first telegraph service and in 1909 the first telephone service were put into use. In the same year the name of the ministry was changed to Posta Telgraf Telefon ("Posts, Telegraph and Telephone" or PTT for short) a name which was used for 86 years. After the Turkish Republic replaced the Ottoman Empire in 1923, the ministry became a general directorate of the Republic. In 1995, the telephone and other telecommunication services were transferred to newly founded Türk Telekom (which was soon privatized). Accordingly, the directorate was renamed as "Organization of Post and Telegraph" (Turkish: Posta Telgraf Teşkilatı), thus the former acronym PTT is kept.

== Services ==
Alongside mailing services, the PTT also offers a variety of other services such as telegraph, postage stamps, philately, hybrid mailing, HGS payments, insurance, PttAVM: an e-commerce website, and PttCell: a mobile virtual network operator using Türk Telekom infrastructure, and much more.

== Service figures ==
In 2020, the service figures of the PTT were as follows:

- Accepted post items: 493 million
- Total revenue: TL 2,917 billion

== Service quality ==
The PTT runs for the ever-growing quality and efficiency with the fully modernized technology. It owns an ISO-9000 Quality Certificate.

The international outbound mail leaves the country from the International Mail Processing Center (Turkish: Uluslararası Posta İşletim Merkezi (UPİM)) at the Istanbul Airport, the PTT's main hub. Most of the mail bags are transported by the state-owned Turkish Airlines. UPİM provides information about the sent items, including the carrier name, flight number, and mail bag number containing the item when detailed information is required domestically. Electronic data interchange is provided whenever available.

== See also ==
- Grand Post Office, built between 1905-1909
- Istanbul Postal Museum, 2000 established in the Istanbul Grand Post Office building
- Stamp Museum in Ankara
