= Salvadori =

Salvadori may refer to:

== Surname ==
- Salvadori (surname), Italian surname

== Birds ==
- Salvadori's antwren, a bird species
- Salvadori's fig parrot, a species of parrot
- Salvadori's nightjar, a bird species
- Salvadori's pheasant, a bird species
- Salvadori's serin, a bird species
- Salvadori's teal, a bird species
- Salvadori's weaver, a bird species

== Buildings ==
- Palazzo Salvadori, a historic building in Trento, Italy
