= Hoogerwerf =

Hoogerwerf is a surname of Dutch origin; it may refer to:

- Andries Hoogerwerf (1906–1977), Dutch athlete and zoologist
  - Hoogerwerf's rat (Rattus hoogerwerfi)
  - Hoogerwerf's pheasant (Lophura hoogerwerfi), also known as Aceh pheasant
- Andries Hoogerwerf (political scientist) (born 1931), Dutch political scientist and public administration scholar
- Dylan Hoogerwerf (born 1995), Dutch short track speed skater
- Jason Hoogerwerf (born 1966), Australian rugby league footballer
