= Sumatran pheasant =

Sumatran pheasant can refer to:

- Hoogerwerf's pheasant
- Salvadori's pheasant
