= Augustus Charles Pugin =

French-born British artist, draughtsman and writer (1762–1832)

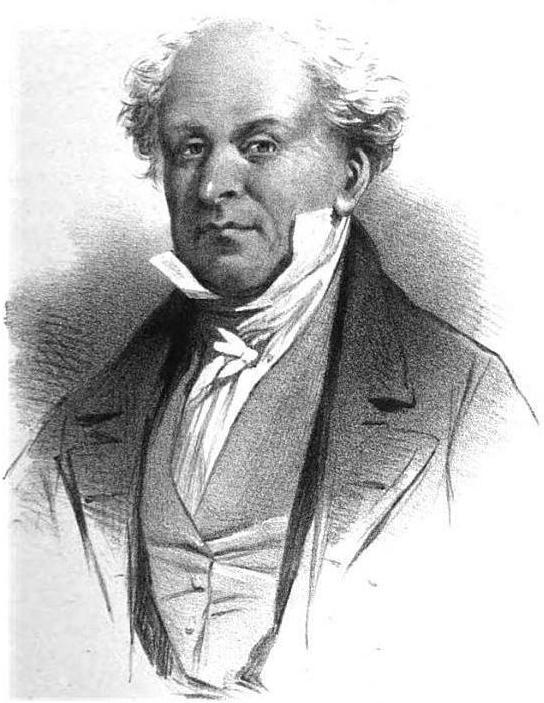
- Born: Auguste-Charles Pugin; 1768; Paris, France
- Died: 19 December 1832 (aged 69–70); London, England
- Education: Royal Academy
- Spouse: Catherine Welby
- Children: Augustus Pugin

Augustus Charles Pugin (born Auguste-Charles Pugin; 1762 – 19 December 1832) was a French-born British artist, architectural draughtsman and writer. He was born in Paris to a Swiss father, and Pugin himself was to spend most of his adult life in England. Pugin left France during the French Revolutionary Wars period for unclear reasons about 1798 and later entered the Royal Academy Schools in London, England to improve his skills. Shortly afterwards he obtained a position as an architectural draughtsman with the architect John Nash. After considering and abandoning a career in architecture Pugin married and settled on a career as a commercial artist working primarily for publishers of illustrated books. He was a skilful watercolourist as well as an accomplished draftsman.

== Drawings ==
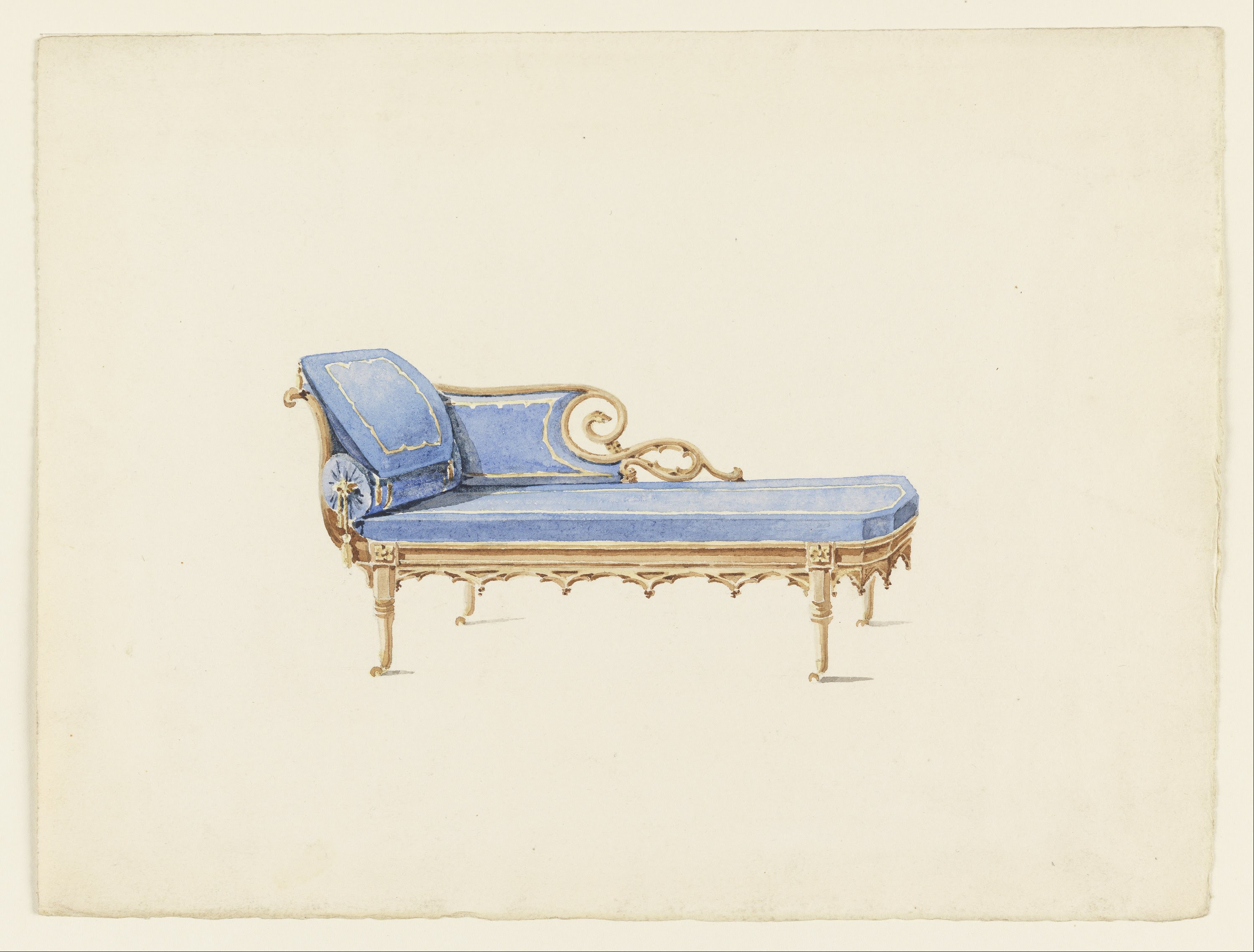
Augustus Charles Pugin – Design for a Sofa in the Gothic Revival Style – Google Art Project

Pugin produced views of London, jointly creating the illustrations for the Microcosm of London (1808–1811) published by Rudolph Ackermann, followed by plates for Ackermann's books about Westminster Abbey, Oxford and Cambridge universities, and Winchester College. He often collaborated with other artists, notably Thomas Rowlandson. His later works included illustrations for Specimens of Gothic Architecture (1821–1823), The Royal Pavilion at Brighton (1826), Architectural Antiquities of Great Britain (1826), Specimens of the Architectural Antiquities of Normandy (1827), Illustrations of the Public Buildings of London (1825 to 1828), Paris and its Environs (1829 to 1831), and Examples of Gothic Architecture (1831). He also produced a book of furniture designs called Gothic Furniture, and assisted architects with detailing for their gothic designs. He ran a drawing school at his house in Great Russell Street, Bloomsbury. His students included W. Lake Price, James Pennethorne, Talbot Bury, J. D'Egville, B. Ferrey, the architects Francis T. Dollman and Benjamin Green, and the comedian Charles James Mathews.

Pugin, along with J. Morgan, also designed the diorama building in Regent's Park in 1823, to house and display the Dioramas of Louis Jacques Mandé Daguerre (1787–1851), a year after the debut of his Paris original in 1822. These exhibitions in London displayed eight of the Daguerre Dioramas (1823–1832), which were also exhibited on tour in Liverpool, Manchester, Dublin and Edinburgh (1825–1836).

Pugin married Catherine Welby of the Lincolnshire Welby family of Denton and his developing interest in the Gothic was to be magnified in the career of their son Augustus Welby Pugin, an architect who was the leading advocate of Gothicism in 19th century England and the designer of the Palace of Westminster, home of the United Kingdom Parliament. Catherine Welby's brother Adlard Welby was great-great-grandfather to Joyce Lussu and Max Salvadori. His son also sometimes assisted him in some of his publications.
