= Hoogewerf =

Hoogewerf is a surname. Notable people with the surname include:

- Rupert Hoogewerf (born 1970), British researcher and accountant
- Simon Hoogewerf (born 1963), Canadian middle-distance runner
- Dillon Hoogewerf (born 2003) Dutch footballer

== See also ==
- Hoogerwerf
