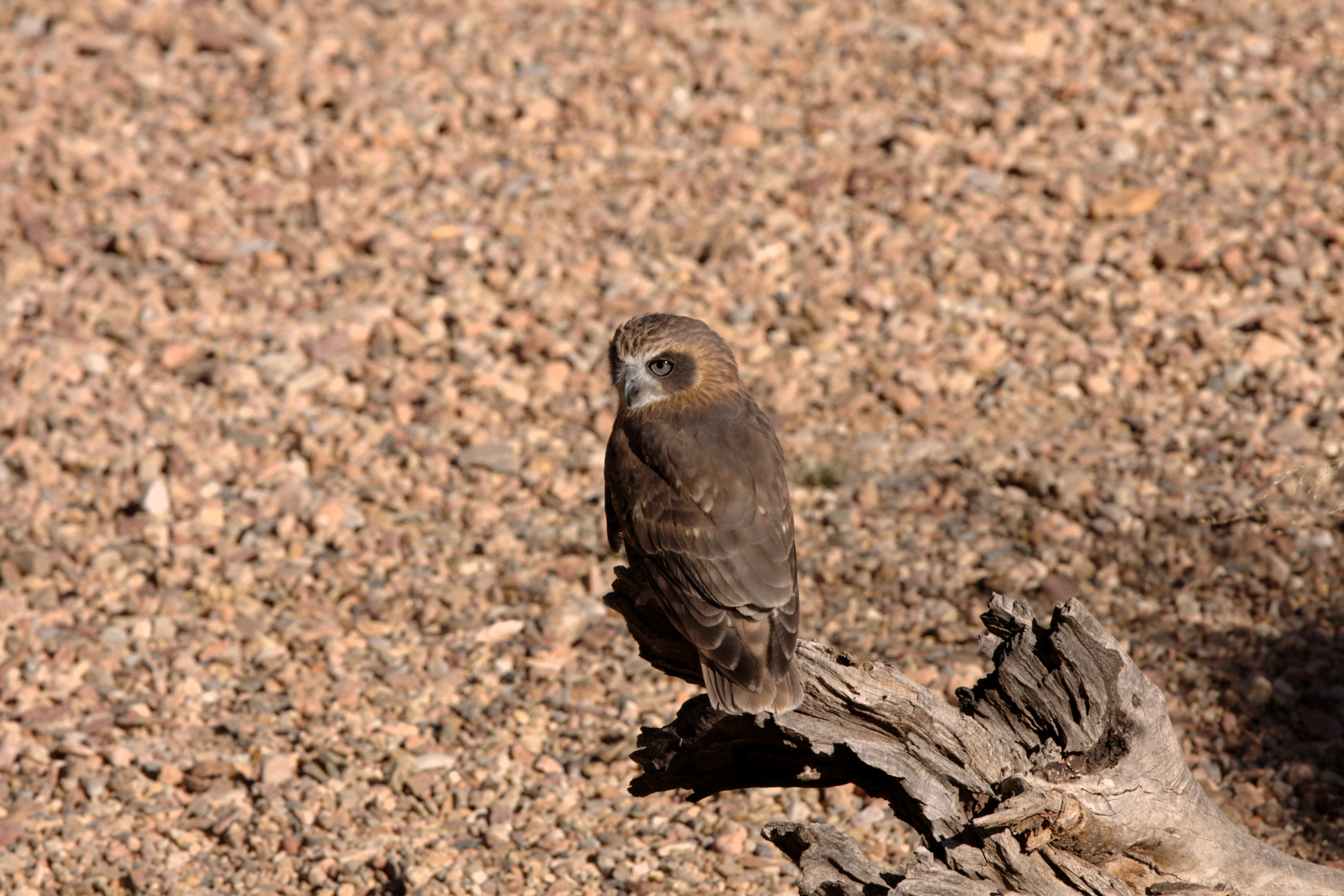
- N. b. ocellata, Central Australia

Scientific classification
- Kingdom: Animalia
- Phylum: Chordata
- Class: Aves
- Order: Strigiformes
- Family: Strigidae
- Genus: Ninox
- Species: N. boobook
- Subspecies: N. b. ocellata

Trinomial name
- Ninox boobook ocellata (Bonaparte, 1850)

= Ninox boobook ocellata =

Subspecies of bird

Ninox boobook ocellata is a subspecies of the Australian boobook, which is also widely known as the southern boobook. The southern boobook is the most common and smallest owl on the Australian mainland.

The subspecies is characterised by its lighter colour than other subspecies, and is generally found in a wide range of habitats (adapting very well to human activities). Ocellata is the smallest of the boobook subspecies as it is found in the warmer western parts of Australia (north-western New South Wales/western Queensland across to Western Australia). although it is not found in arid areas.

The boobook can be commonly known as the 'mopoke' due to its call (double hoot 'boo-book'). This owl is commonly mixed up with the barking owl due to their similar appearance; however, the boobook is a fair amount smaller. The boobook feeds on insects and small vertebrates (usually around the size of a mouse).

== Physical description ==
The ocellata subspecies of southern boobook differs from other subspecies in its plumage colouring, which is lighter than the mainland birds. southern boobooks have brown plumage on their backs and cream to rufous brown stomachs, often heavily streaked or spotted with white, they have markings on the scapulars and spots on the wings.

All boobooks have a 'facial mask' with dark chocolate brown circles around the eyes, these circles are outlined by lighter triangle shaped areas on the throat and forehead. The eyes are large and grey-green or yellow, and the bill grey. Being the smallest species of owl on the Australian mainland the boobook weighs in at 200–300 g, smaller birds being found in warmer areas (ocellata tends to be smaller), and measuring 27–37 cm in length. Boobooks are often confused with the barking owl; however, the easiest way to differentiate is by size, the boobook is a fair bit smaller.

Mayr found that colour in southern boobooks may directly correlate with rainfall, with the paler species being found in areas of lower rainfall, indicating the semi arid regions of Australia (the range of the ocellata subspecies).

== Call ==
The boobook has a very distinctive double hoot 'boo-book' with the second note being lower. This call has earned it the common name of 'mopoke'.

== Distribution and habitat ==
Subspecies ocellata tends to inhabit the warmer areas of Australia, from north-western New South Wales/western Queensland spanning across to Western Australia, although it is rarely found in the more arid regions. The boobook is found in a wide variety of habitats, from semi-arid areas, to scrubland, open woodland and forests. This species has adapted to human influence very well, being found in any area where there are scattered trees (such as suburban areas or farmland).

== Diet ==
The boobook is predominantly a nocturnal hunter, although morning and afternoon hunts can occasionally occur (on dull or overcast days). The boobook feeds on small vertebrates and insects (generally nocturnal species of insect and small vertebrates approximately the size of a mouse) with prey being located by observation from a high perch, the boobook can catch prey both aerially and on land.

== Breeding ==
The southern boobook breeds from September until February, with peak breeding happening in October. They nest in tree hollows high above the ground, and line nests with leaves and small twigs. Clutch sizes range from 3–5 eggs and are incubated for a period of approximately 31 days, and have a nesting period of 42 days, females incubate the eggs alone yet both sexes assist with feeding. Little is known about the life span of these birds; however, it is known that they reach breeding age at 2–3 years of age. The last recorded life span of a pure subspecies of southern boobook was at least 12 years of age, with hybrid individuals reaching a recorded 18 years of age.
