= Salvadori (surname) =

Salvadori is an Italian surname.

== Geographical distribution ==
As of 2014, 76.9% of all known bearers of the surname Salvadori were residents of Italy (frequency 1:4,046), 11.6% of Brazil (1:89,580), 5.3% of France (1:64,135), 2.3% of Argentina (1:93,736) and 1.9% of the United States (1:945,684).

In Italy, the frequency of the surname was higher than national average (1:4,046) in the following regions:

1. Tuscany (1:437)
2. Trentino-Alto Adige/Südtirol (1:1,132)
3. Veneto (1:2,947)
4. Aosta Valley (1:3,443)

== People ==
- Giulio Salvadori (1862–1928), Italian educator
- Mario Salvadori (1907–1997), Italian structural engineer and educator
- Massimo Salvadori, or Max Salvadori (1908–1992), Anglo-Italian historian
- Pierre Salvadori (born 1964), French film director born in Tunisia
- Roy Salvadori (1922–2012), English motor racing driver
- Tommaso Salvadori (1835–1923), Italian zoologist and ornithologist.
