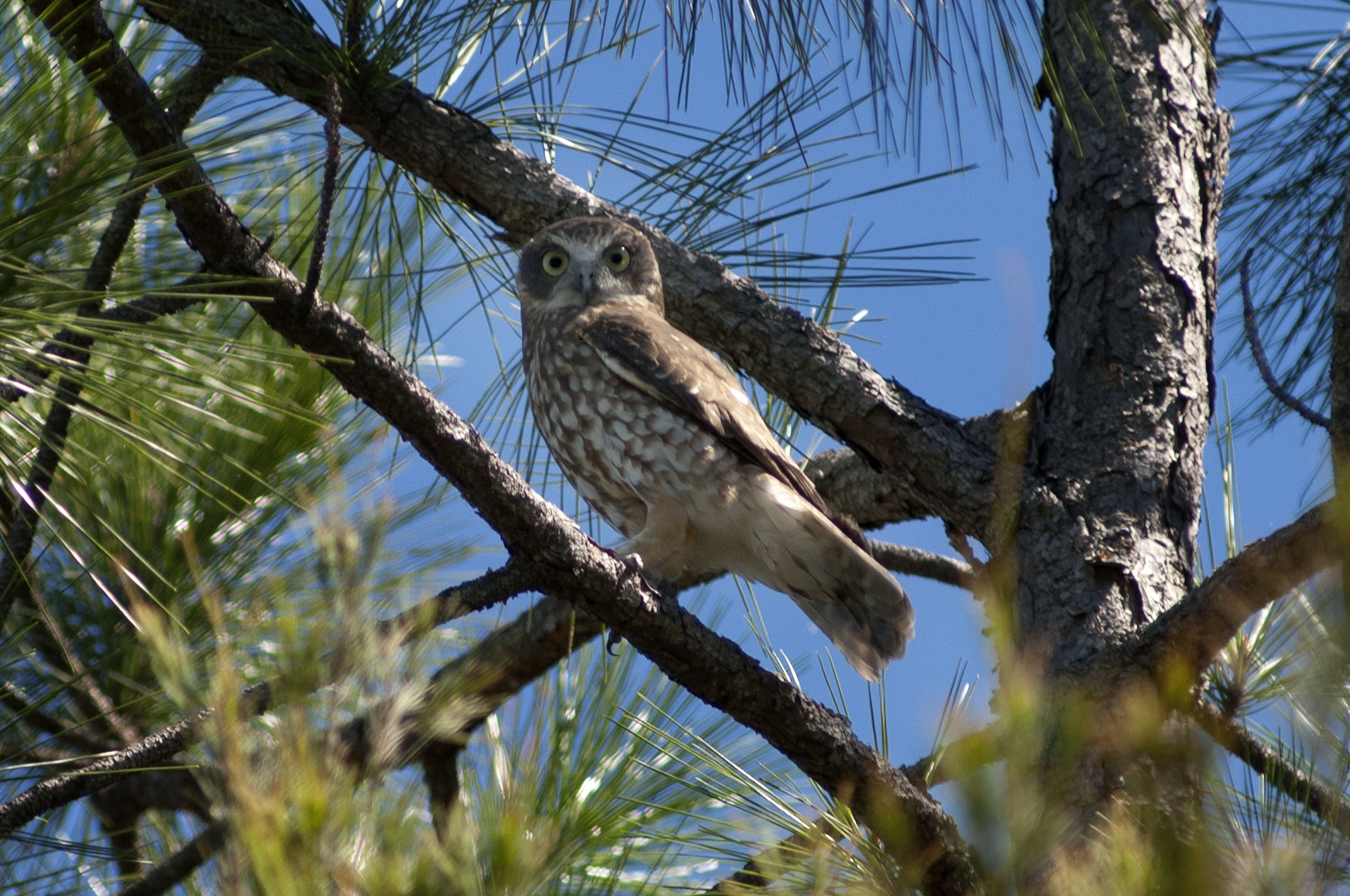

Conservation status
- Least Concern (IUCN 3.1)
- CITES Appendix II

Scientific classification
- Kingdom: Animalia
- Phylum: Chordata
- Class: Aves
- Order: Strigiformes
- Family: Strigidae
- Genus: Ninox
- Species: N. boobook

Binomial name
- Ninox boobook (Latham, 1801)

Subspecies
- 11, see text
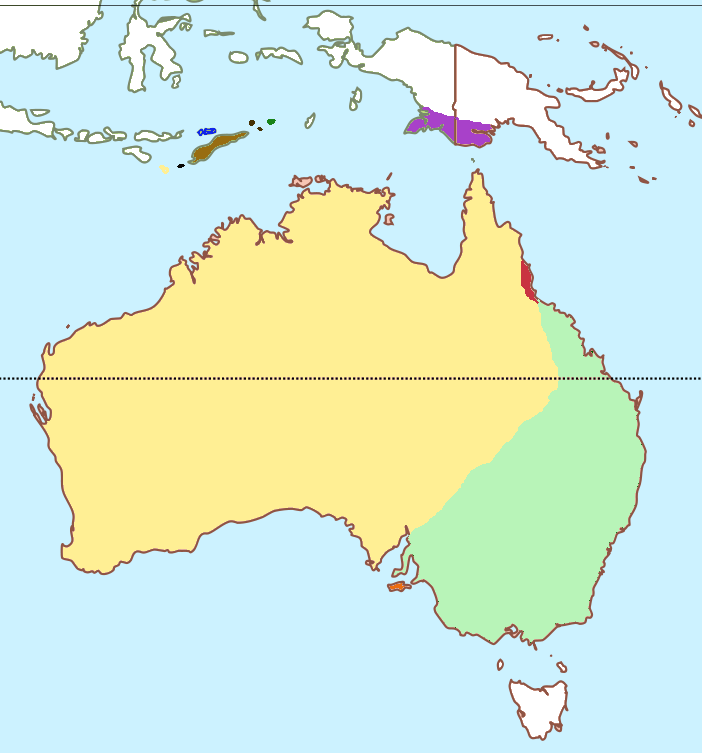
- Distribution of Ninox boobook subspecies, including 3 related species N.b.boobook N.b.ocellata N.b.halmaturina N.b.lurida N. fusca N.b.pusilla N. plesseni N. rotiensis N.b.moae N.b.cinnamomina

Synonyms
- Strix boobook Latham, 1801
- Athene marmorata Gould, 1846
- Athene ocellata Bonaparte, 1850
- Ieraglaux (Spiloglaux) bubuk Kaup, 1852
- Strix novaehollandiae Strickland, 1855
- Ninox boobook mixta Mathews, 1912
- Ninox boobook melvillensis Mathews, 1912
- Ninox boobook macgillivrayi Mathews, 1912
- Spiloglaux boobook tregellasi Mathews, 1913
- Spiloglaux novaeseelandiae everardi Mathews, 1913
- Ninox yorki Cayley, 1929
- Ninox ooldeaensis Cayley, 1929
- Ninox novaeseelandiae aridaMayr, 1943
- Spiloglaux boobook parocellataMathews, 1946

= Australian boobook =

Species of owl native to Australia

The Australian boobook (Ninox boobook) is a species of owl native to mainland Australia, southern New Guinea, the island of Timor, and the Sunda Islands. Described by John Latham in 1801, it was generally considered to be the same species as the morepork of New Zealand until 1999. Its name is derived from its two-tone boo-book call. Eight subspecies of the Australian boobook are recognized, with three further subspecies being reclassified as separate species in 2019 due to their distinctive calls and genetics.

The smallest owl on the Australian mainland, the Australian boobook is 27 to 36 cm (10.5 to 14 in) long, with predominantly dark-brown plumage with prominent pale spots. It has grey-green or yellow-green eyes. It is generally nocturnal, though sometimes it is active at dawn and dusk, retiring to roost in secluded spots in the foliage of trees. The Australian boobook feeds on insects and small vertebrates, hunting by pouncing on them from tree perches. Breeding takes place from late winter to early summer, using tree hollows as nesting sites. The International Union for Conservation of Nature has assessed the Australian boobook as being of least concern on account of its large range and apparently stable population.

== Taxonomy ==
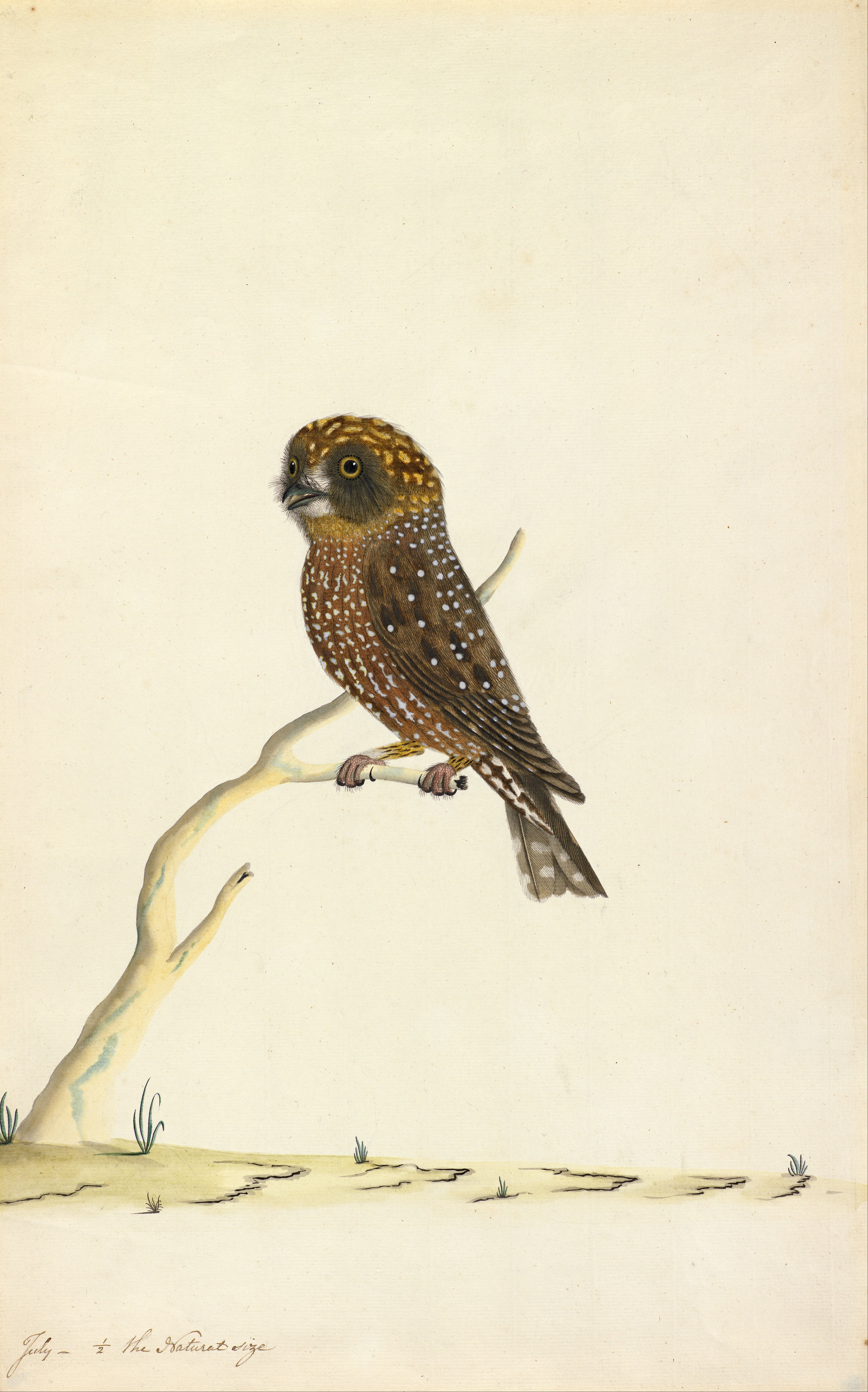
The c. 1790 painting by Thomas Watling on which Latham's description is based

English ornithologist John Latham described the boobook owl as Strix boobook in 1801, writing about it in English, before giving it its scientific name, taking its species epithet from a local Dharug word for the bird. The species description was based on a painting by Thomas Watling of a bird—the holotype—in the Sydney district in the 1790s. John Gould described Athene marmorata in 1846 from a specimen in South Australia. This is regarded as a synonym. German naturalist Johann Jakob Kaup classified the two taxa into subgenus Spiloglaux of a new genus Ieraglaux in 1852, renaming S. boobook to Ieraglaux (Spiloglaux) bubuk. In his 1865 Handbook to the Birds of Australia, Gould recognised three species, all of which he placed in the genus Spiloglaux: S. marmoratus from South Australia, S. boobook, which is widespread across the Australian mainland and Tasmania, and S. maculatus from southeastern Australia and Tasmania. Meanwhile, in India, English naturalist Brian Houghton Hodgson had established the genus Ninox in 1837, and his countryman Edward Blyth placed the Australian boobook in the new genus in 1849.

Australian boobook has been designated the official name by the International Ornithological Committee, changed from "southern boobook" in 2019 with the separation of some Indonesian subspecies. The common name comes from the two-tone call of the bird, and has also been transcribed as "mopoke". William Dawes recorded the name bōkbōk "an owl" in 1790 or 1791, in his transcription of the Dharug language, and English explorer George Caley had recorded the native name as buck-buck during the earliest days of the colony, reporting that early settlers had called it cuckoo owl as its call was reminiscent of the common cuckoo. He added, "The settlers in New South Wales are led away by the idea that everything is the reverse in that country to what it is in England; and the Cuckoo, as they call this bird, singing by night, is one of the instances they point out." Gould recorded local aboriginal names: Goor-goor-da (Western Australia), Mel-in-de-ye (Port Essington), and Koor-koo (South Australia). Alternative common names include spotted owl and brown owl. The Ngarluma people of the western Pilbara knew it as gurrgumarlu. In the Yuwaaliyaay dialect of the Gamilaraay language of southeastern Australia, the Australian boobook is guurrguurr.

Dutch naturalist Gerlof Mees and German evolutionary biologist Ernst Mayr regarded the taxonomy of the boobook owl complex as extremely challenging, the latter remarking in 1943 that it was "one of the most difficult problems I have ever encountered". In his 1964 review of Australian owls, Mees treated Australian and New Zealand boobooks, along with several taxa from Indonesia and Papua New Guinea, as one species—Ninox novaeseelandiae—with 16 subspecies. In his 1968 book Nightwatchmen of the Bush and Plain, Australian naturalist David Fleay observed that the boobooks from Tasmania more closely resembled those of New Zealand than those from mainland Australia, though he followed Mees in treating them as a single species. The Australian boobook was split from the Tasmanian boobook and morepork in volume 5 of the Handbook of the Birds of the World in 1999, though several authors, including Australian ornithologists Les Christidis and Walter Boles, continued to treat the three taxa (Australian plus Tasmanian boobooks and moreporks) as a single species.

Examining both morphological and genetic (cytochrome b) characters in 2008, German biologist Michael Wink and colleagues concluded that the Australian boobook is distinct from the morepork and Tasmanian boobook (which they proposed to be raised to species status as Ninox leucopsis), and that it is instead the sister taxon to the barking owl (N. connivens). A 2017 study by Singapore-based biologist Chyi Yin Gwee and colleagues analysing both multi-locus DNA and boobook calls confirmed a sister relationship of N. n. novaeseelandiae and N. (n.) leucopsis and their close relationship to N. connivens. Genetic and call analysis show the Christmas boobook (N. natalis) to be very close to the Australian populations of the Australian boobook, leading Gwee and colleagues to suggest it be reclassified within this species.

Gwee and colleagues found that boobook populations on larger, mountainous islands were more distinct from Australian stock, while those on flatter smaller islands were much more similar. This was taken as suggesting that these locations were colonised much more recently, after previous populations had become extinct.

=== Subspecies ===
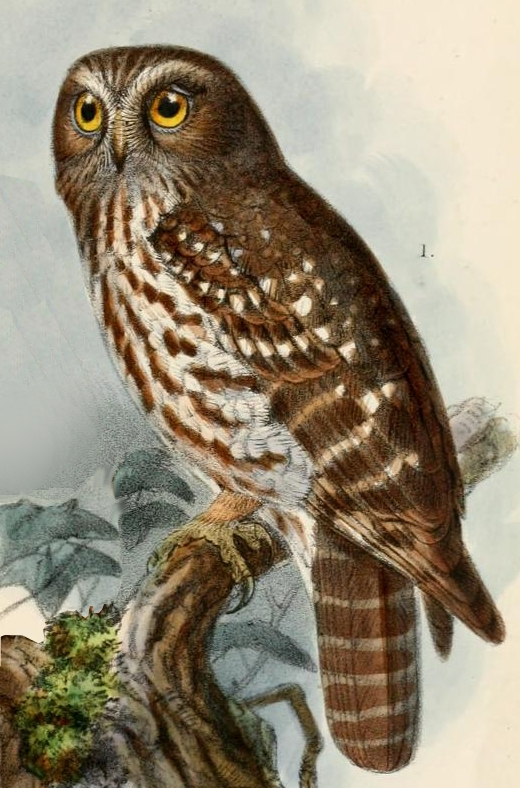
Illustration of N. b. fusca by J. G. Keulemans

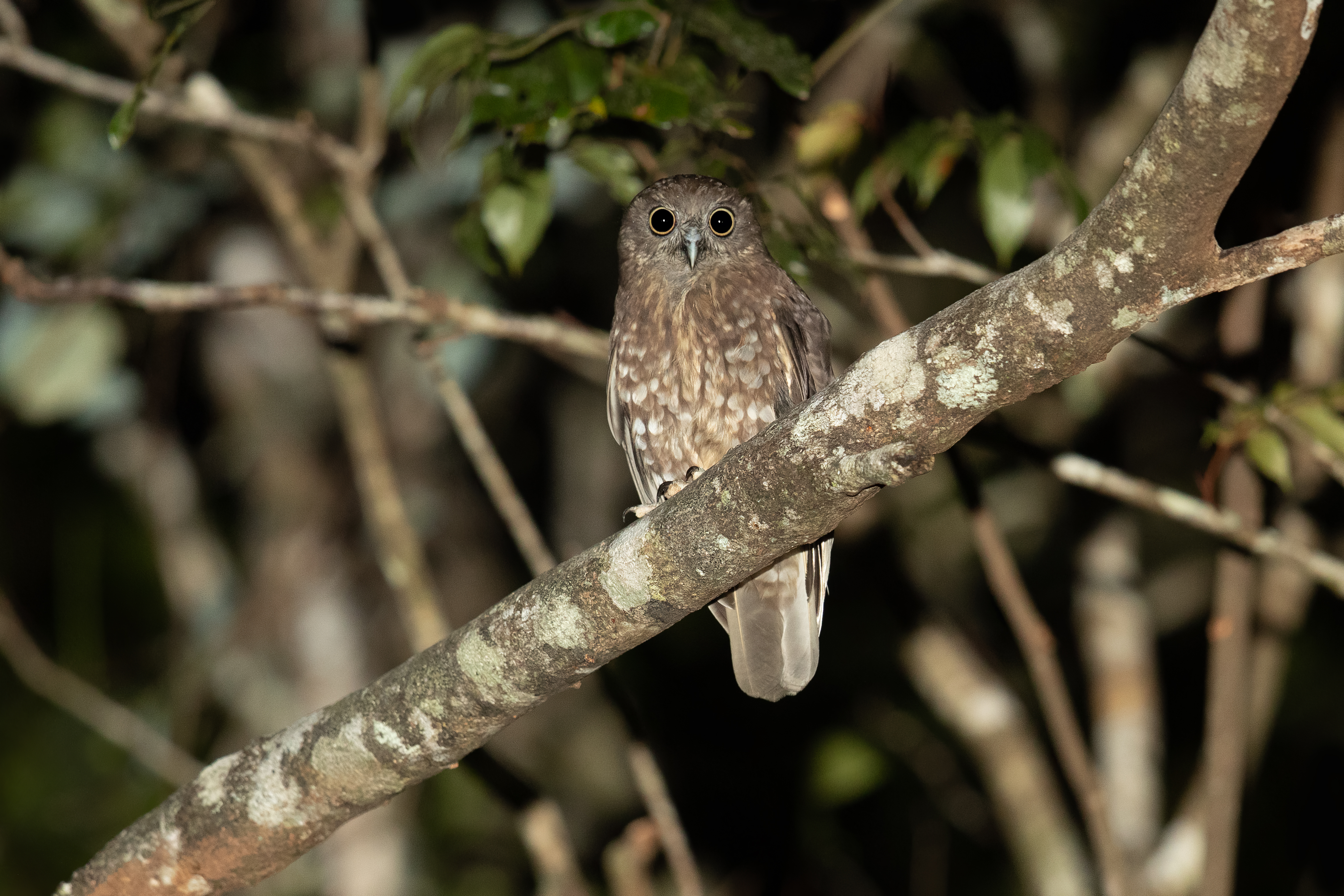
Red boobook – N. b. lurida

Seven subspecies of Ninox boobook are recognised in version 12.1 of the IOC World Bird List, published in January 2022:

- N. b. boobook, the nominate subspecies, is found on the Australian mainland, from southern Queensland, through New South Wales and Victoria into South Australia. Port Augusta marks its westernmost range limit, with subspecies N. b. ocellata found westwards. The border between these two taxa is unclear.
- N. b. cinnamomina is found on Tepa and Babar Islands in the eastern Lesser Sunda Islands. It has cinnamon upperparts, brownish crown and cinnamon-streaked underparts. Its redder coloration and small size led German naturalist Ernst Hartert to describe it as a distinct taxon in 1906. The call is similar to those of the Australian subspecies.
- N. b. halmaturina is found on Kangaroo Island. It was described by Australian amateur ornithologist Gregory Mathews in 1912 on the basis of darker and more reddish plumage than other subspecies. It is sometimes included in the nominate subspecies. It has dark brown underparts with reddish-brown rather than white markings. Some individuals of subspecies boobook from the mainland do have similar coloration, but are consistently larger.
- N. b. lurida, also known as the red boobook, is a distinctive subspecies from north Queensland. English naturalist Charles Walter De Vis discovered it in 1887, describing it from two specimens collected in the vicinity of Cardwell. Analysis of its DNA and call differ little from other Australian mainland subspecies. It is small and dark compared to other subspecies, with a reddish tinge and few spots on its upperparts, and many spots on its underparts. It also has much thinner and less obvious white eyebrows than other subspecies.
- N. b. moae is found on Moa, Leti and Romang Islands in the Lesser Sunda Islands. It is darker than subspecies boobook. It was described by Mayr in 1943 from a specimen collected by one H. Kühn in 1902 on Moa. Mayr noted that it had dark reddish upperparts with pronounced barring on wings and tail, larger white spots on scapulars and buff streaks on the nape. The call is similar to those of the Australian subspecies.
- N. b. ocellata is found across northern Australia, Western Australia and western South Australia, as well as Savu near Timor. It was described as Athene ocellata by French biologist Charles Lucien Bonaparte in 1850, from a specimen from Raffles Bay on the Cobourg Peninsula. It is generally lighter-coloured than other mainland boobooks, though occasional dark-plumaged individuals are seen. The face, in particular, is pale with feathers of the forehead and lores white with black shafts. Birds from Melville Island are small and generally dark and were previously classified as a separate subspecies melvillensis by Mathews in 1912. Birds from southwestern Australia north to Tantabiddy on the North West Cape and Glenflorrie on the Ashburton River are relatively dark with more uniform rufous-brown underparts. Mees classified them as a separate subspecies rufigaster. Mayr classified the lightest birds of northern Australia as arida, medium-toned birds as mixta and darker ones macgillivrayi. All these taxa are now regarded as ocellata. Its call is similar to that of the nominate subspecies.
- N. b. pusilla is from the southern lowlands of New Guinea, along the Oriomo and Wassi Kusa Rivers, west of the Fly River. Described by Mayr and Canadian zoologist Austin L. Rand in 1935 from a specimen collected in Dogwa, it resembles subspecies ocellata but is smaller.

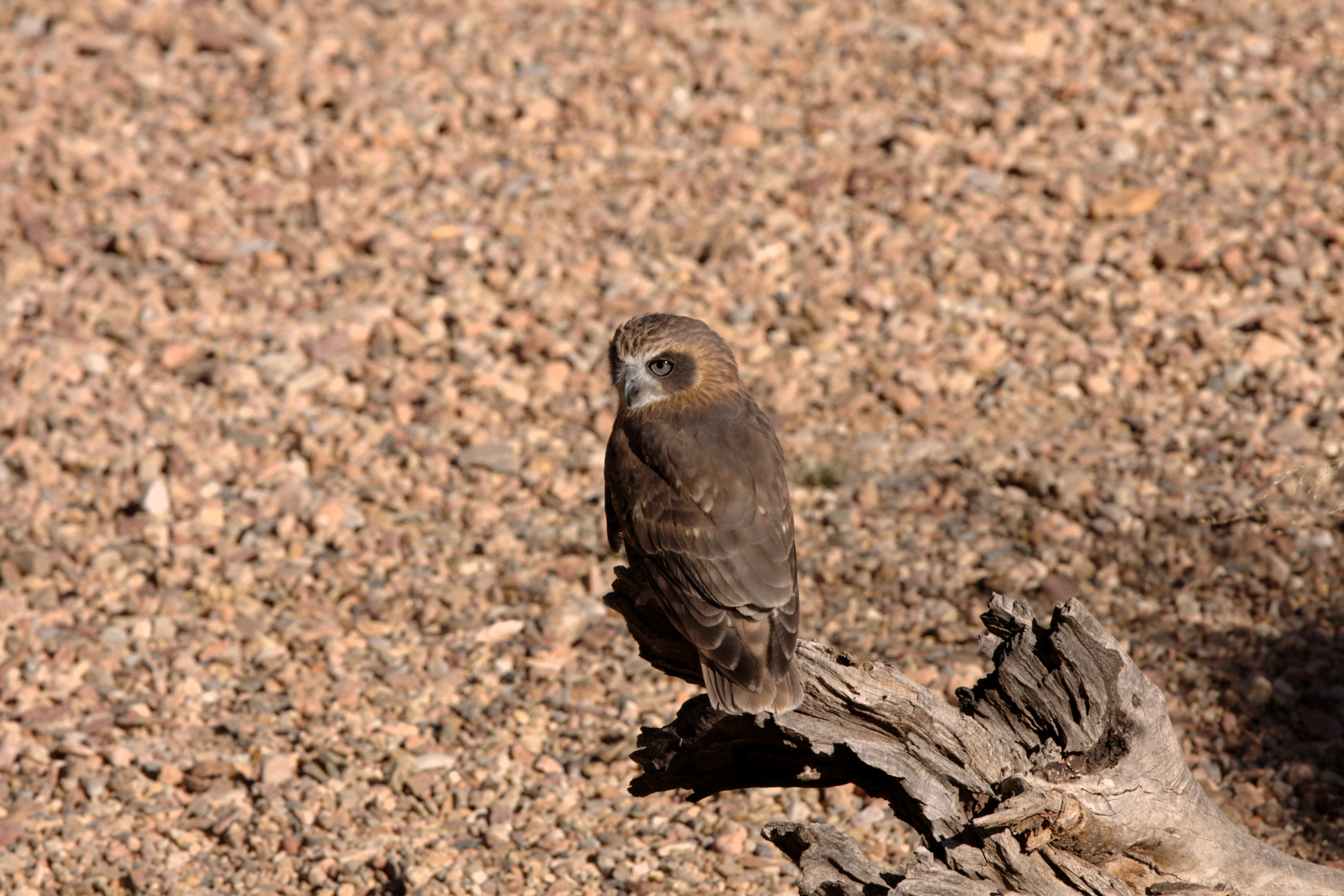
Subspecies ocellata, Central Australia

Three former subspecies of Ninox boobook have been classified as distinct species since 2017: namely, Rote boobook (Ninox rotiensis), Timor boobook (N. fusca), and Alor boobook (N. plesseni). The subspecies N. b. remigialis was transferred to the barking owl by the International Ornithological Congress in 2022.

== Description ==
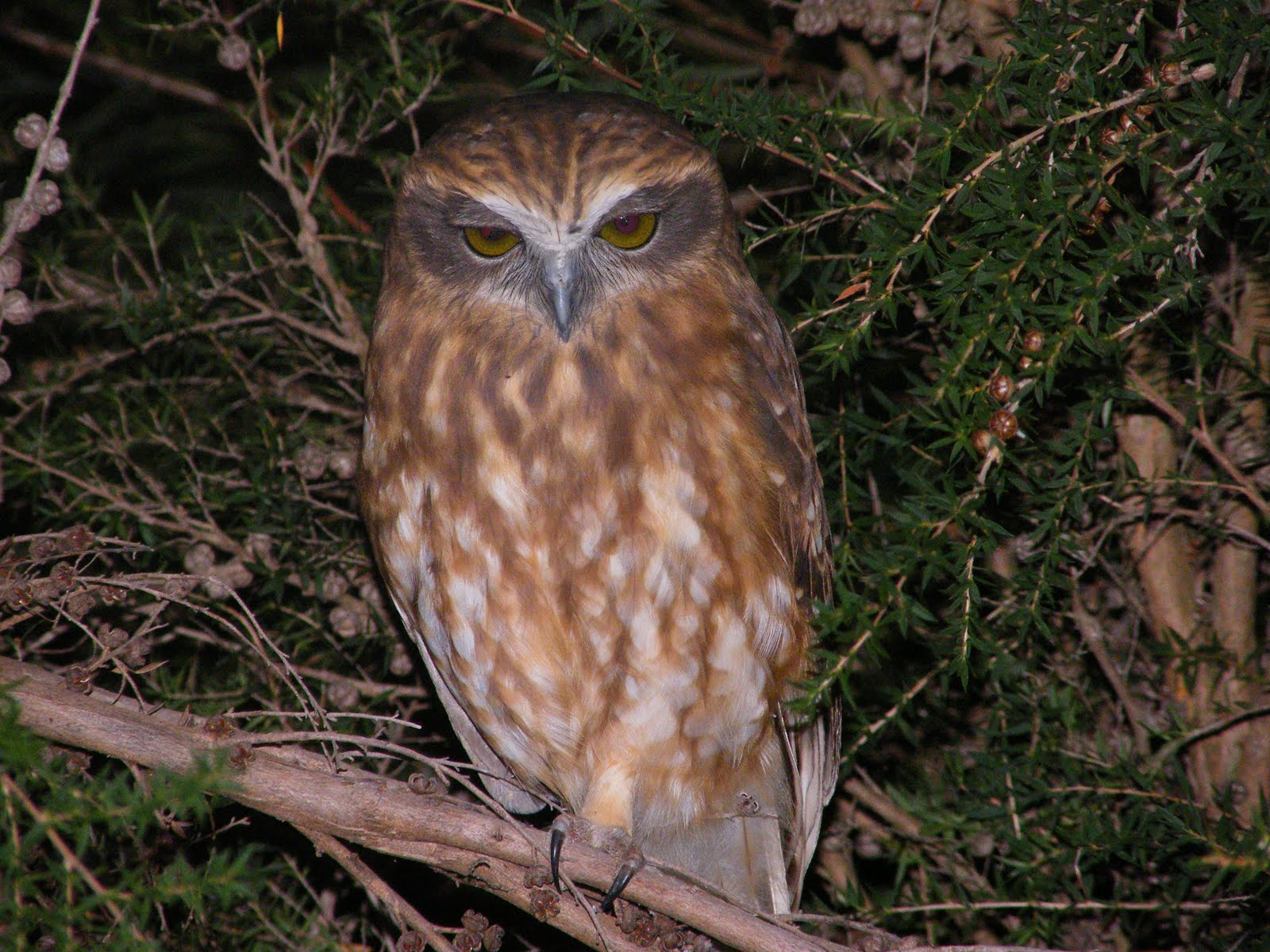
Subspecies boobook roosting in Melbourne

The smallest owl on the Australian mainland, the Australian boobook is 27 to 36 cm (10.5 to 14 in) long. The nominate subspecies is the largest. It has short, rounded wings and a short tail, with a compact silhouette in flight. Australian boobooks on the Australian mainland follow Bergmann's rule, in that birds from cooler and more southerly parts of the range tend to be larger. Thus, birds from the Canberra region weigh around 300 g (11 oz) while those from the Cape York Peninsula and Broome are around 200 g (7.1 oz). Females tend to be a little larger and heavier than males, with males weighing 146–360 g (5.1–12.7 oz) and females 170–298 g (6.0–10.5 oz).

The Australian boobook has generally dark brown head and upperparts, with white markings on the scapulars and spots on the wings. Its head lacks tufts common in other owls and has a paler facial disk, with a white supercilium (eyebrow) and dark brown ear coverts and cheeks. The brown feathers of the upper forehead, above the supercilium, and sides of the neck have yellow-brown highlights. The feathers of the lores, chin and throat are white with black shafts. The feathers of the underparts are mostly brown with white spots and dark blue-grey bases. The upper tail is dark brown with lighter brown bars and a grey fringe at the end, while the undertail is a lighter grey-brown. The female tends to be more prominently streaked than the male overall, though this is inconsistent and wide variation is seen. The eyes have been described as grey-green, green-yellow, or even light hazel. The bill is black with a pale blue-grey base and cere. The feet are greyish to pinkish brown with dark grey to blackish claws. The underparts are pale, ranging from buff to cream, and are streaked with brown. The overall colour is variable and does not appear to correspond to subspecies or region. In northern and central Australia, Mayr found that the colour of the plumage appears to correlate with the rainfall or humidity, paler birds being found in three disjunct areas, each around 1,600 km (990 mi) away from the other two: the western Kimberley and Pilbara, Sedan on the Cloncurry River, and around Ooldea, with darker birds found on Cape York and Melville Island.

Young Australian boobooks are usually paler than adults and do not attain adult plumage properly until their third or fourth year. Juveniles (up to a year old) have whitish underparts and foreneck, a larger and more prominent pale eyebrow and larger whitish spots on their upperparts. The tips of their feathers are white and fluffy, remnants of the nestlings' down. These are worn away over time, persisting longest on the head. The feathers of the head, neck and underparts are fluffier overall. Immatures in their second and third year have plumage more like adults, though their crowns are paler and more heavily streaked.

=== Similar species ===
On mainland Australia, it could be confused with the barking owl or the brown boobook (Ninox scutulata), a rare vagrant to the northwest, although the Australian boobook is easily distinguished by its squat posture and distinctive pale border to its face mask. The Tasmanian boobook has been recorded from southern Victoria, with one record from New South Wales. It has darker and more reddish upperparts with brighter white dots, with more prominent white dots and a yellow-brown tinge to the underparts. It has pinkish grey feet and golden eyes.

== Distribution and habitat ==
The Australian boobook is found across mainland Australia, although it is scarce in more arid regions such as western New South Wales, southwestern and western Queensland, much of South Australia away from the coast and interior Western Australia and Northern Territory. In drier areas, it is generally found along watercourses such as the Darling and Paroo Rivers, and Lake Eyre Basin. It is found on numerous offshore islands such as Groote Eylandt, Melville Island, Mornington Island in the Gulf of Carpentaria and many islands off eastern Australia. It is found in southern New Guinea, Timor and surrounding islands in Indonesia. It is found in a wide range of habitats, from forest and open woodland to scrubland and semidesert areas. In Australia, it resides in mainly eucalypt forests. It has adapted to landscapes altered by human activity and is found in farmland and suburban areas as long as some scattered trees are present.

== Behaviour ==
The Australian boobook is a mainly nocturnal species, though it may be active at dawn and dusk. It is heard much more commonly than seen, being particularly vocal in the breeding season. The characteristic two-note boo-book call or hoot can be heard up to 1 km (0.6 mi) away, the second note generally lower in pitch than the first. Samples can be heard online. Calling takes place from sunset through dawn, generally with a peak in the two hours after dusk and just before dawn. It can continue for several hours. The male's hooting is higher pitched and of shorter duration, and is heard much more commonly than that of the female. He uses it as a contact call and to advertise his territory to females, as well as when bringing food to his mate or even before mating. Birds give a harsher version of the call when mobbing intruders. Both sexes, though mainly the female, give a single monosyllabic hoot as an alarm call or warning. Australian boobooks also make a repetitive croaking or grunting call while courting, mating, or greeting, or as a response to other boobooks hooting. Birds may switch from croaks to hoots seamlessly. Males generally croak at the beginning of the evening, and when arriving at the nest with food. A purring or braying call is used by both sexes as a contact call around the nest and (more quietly) when bringing food to nestlings, or by the female to beg for food from the male. The female makes a low trill during courtship and nesting. Growls, high-pitched yelps, and screeches can be made when attacking intruders.

The Australian boobook maintains and defends a territory in the breeding season; whether this continues for the rest of the year is unclear. It retires to densely foliated spots in trees in the daytime, each individual often having several roosting sites. Caves or ledges are alternative roosting sites if no suitable trees are available. Although unobtrusive, it may give itself away by droppings or pellets on the ground beneath. The Australian boobook is mobbed by passerines if discovered. It may allow people to approach to within 1 to 3 m (3.5 to 10 ft).

The maximum age recorded from banding has been 15 years 11 months, in a bird caught and later caught again on Black Mountain in the Australian Capital Territory.

=== Breeding ===
Across Australia, breeding takes place from July to February, peaks in October, and is generally earlier in more northern areas. Eggs are laid from August to October in Queensland, from September to November in New South Wales and southern Western Australia, July to September in central and northern Western Australia, in October and November in Victoria, and in September to December in South Australia.

The Australian boobook nests in holes in trees between 1 and 20 m (3–70 ft) above the ground. The holes are generally vertical, and mostly in eucalypts, though other trees such as coast banksia (Banksia integrifolia) have been recorded. Some sites are reused by the species for up to 20 years, especially if broods have been successfully raised in them before. Boobooks may also evict other birds such as galahs (Eolophus roseicapillus) to use their hollows, and have used sites abandoned by babblers, crows, and ravens. The male does more of the site preparation, such as lining the base of the hollow with leaves.

Two or three oval, white eggs, laid two to three days apart, are most commonly laid in a clutch, though one to five may be seen. They average 41.6 mm long by 35.5 mm wide and are finely pitted. The female alone incubates the eggs, during which time she is fed by the male. She does leave the nest at dusk for around half an hour, sometimes to bathe. Incubation takes 30–31 days, with the young often hatching at the same time. Occasionally, the time between the first and the last eggs hatching can be a few days.

Newly hatched chicks are covered with whitish down, and are blind and largely helpless (nidicolous). Their eyes begin to open on day 6 and are fully open by day 15. The juvenile feathers begin growing through the down from days 7 to 10, covering the baby owls by two weeks of age. Their mother broods them continuously for the first week, then only in the day until the third week. Her partner brings food to the nest, which she tears into pieces before feeding the nestlings. The young regurgitate pellets and defecate in the nest, which becomes quite smelly. They leave the nest 5–6 weeks after hatching, by which time they are fully feathered, with downy head and underparts and short tails. The tail reaches its adult length by 65 to 70 days. Young boobooks then live in their parents' territory for a further 2–4 months before dispersing, losing the remainder of their downy feathers by around 5 months of age.

Brushtail possums (Trichosurus spp.) and introduced cats and rats raid the nests for nestlings and eggs, and raptors such as the brown goshawk (Accipiter fasciatus), grey goshawk (Accipiter novaehollandiae), Australian masked owl (Tyto novaehollandiae), and probably powerful owl (Ninox strenua) seize young birds. Juvenile Australian boobooks are at greater risk after bushfires and have perished after being tangled up in dodder (Cassytha) or bidgee-widgee (Acaena novae-zelandiae).

=== Feeding ===
The Australian boobook generally preys on mice, insects, particularly nocturnal beetles and moths, and birds the size of a house sparrow (Passer domesticus). A higher proportion of its diet is invertebrates compared with other Australian owls. Fieldwork in the vicinity of Canberra found that vertebrates made up more of the diet in autumn and particularly in winter. Although more invertebrates were eaten than vertebrates (even more so in autumn), they made up only 2.8% of the biomass consumed. Mammals were the predominant prey species, especially the house mouse (Mus musculus), and also black rat (Rattus rattus), bush rat (R. fuscipes), and Gould's wattled bat (Chalinolobus gouldii). Birds including common starling (Sturnus vulgaris), house sparrow, red-browed finch (Neochmia temporalis), common myna (Acridotheres tristis), red-rumped parrot (Psephotus haematonotus), and white-browed babbler (Pomatostomus superciliosus), and invertebrates including grasshoppers, crickets, beetles, cockroaches, moths, wolf spiders, and huntsman spiders were also consumed. A study in Victoria found that larger animals were eaten, including Baillon's crake (Porzana pusilla), common ringtail possum (Pseudocheirus peregrinus) and feral rabbit (Oryctolagus cuniculus).

Using a fence, branch, or telegraph pole as a perch or vantage point from which to hunt, the Australian boobook pounces on prey then retreats to a tree or elevated place to eat it. It often hunts in open areas near trees, and also where prey is likely to congregate, such as mice near haystacks or barns, or flying insects near street- or house-lights.

== Conservation status ==
A widespread and generally common species, the Australian boobook is listed as being a species of least concern by the International Union for Conservation of Nature, on account of its huge range and stable population, with no evidence of any significant decline. Like most species of owl, the Australian boobook is protected under Appendix II of the Convention on International Trade in Endangered Species of Wild Fauna and Flora (CITES) meaning the international import and export of the species (including parts and derivatives) is regulated. A decline has occurred on the Swan Coastal Plain north of Perth. There, Australian boobook owls are dying after eating the rodents people have killed with second-generation anticoagulant rat poison. Older poisons such as warfarin or coumatetralyl were unlikely to affect owls.

== Sources ==
- Higgins, P.J. (1999). Handbook of Australian, New Zealand and Antarctic Birds. Volume 4: Parrots to Dollarbird (PDF). Melbourne, Victoria: Oxford University Press. ISBN 978-0-19-553071-1.
