= Rio Suno antwren =

Conservation status
- Least Concern (IUCN 3.1)

Scientific classification
- Kingdom: Animalia
- Phylum: Chordata
- Class: Aves
- Order: Passeriformes
- Family: Thamnophilidae
- Genus: Myrmotherula
- Species: M. sunensis

Binomial name
- Myrmotherula sunensis Chapman, 1925

Species of bird

The Rio Suno antwren (Myrmotherula sunensis) is a species of bird in subfamily Thamnophilinae of family Thamnophilidae, the "typical antbirds". It is found in Brazil, Colombia, Ecuador and Peru.

== Taxonomy and systematics ==
The Rio Suno antwren has two subspecies, the nominate M. s. sunensis (Chapman, 1925) and M. s. yessupi (Bond, J, 1950).

The Rio Suno antwren, slaty antwren (M. schisticolor), and Salvadori's antwren (M. minor) have similar morphology, behavior, and voices and may form a monophyletic group.

== Description ==
The Rio Suno antwren is about 9 cm (3.5 in) long. It is a smallish bird with a short tail. Adult males of the nominate subspecies are mostly gray with a hidden white patch between the shoulders. Their wings are darker gray with white tips on the coverts. Their throat and upper breast are black. Adult females have olive-brown upperparts with a browner tail and wings. Their underparts are mostly dull buff with a rufous tinge; their sides, flanks, and crissum have an olive-brown tinge. Subadult males are like adult females with some black starting to show on the throat and breast. Males of subspecies M. s. yessupi are like the nominate; females are grayer above and less rufescent below than the nominate.

== Distribution and habitat ==
The Rio Suno antwren has a disjunct distribution, and is found locally within each area. The nominate subspecies is found in south-central Colombia's Meta Department and from Putumayo Department in southern Colombia into eastern Ecuador as far as Pastaza Province. Subspecies M. s. yessupi is found in east-central Peru's departments of Huánuco and Pasco and into southwestern Brazil at least to the Rio Juruá. The species inhabits the understorey to mid-storey of evergreen forest and mature secondary forest in the lowlands and foothills. In Colombia and Ecuador it occurs almost entirely in terra firme forest; in Brazil it is associated with várzea and transitional forests. In all areas it appears to favor areas with dense and viny vegetation including much Heliconia. In elevation it occurs mostly between 200 and 500 m (700 and 1,600 ft) but reaches 900 m (3,000 ft) in a few places.

== Behavior ==
=== Movement ===
The Rio Suno antwren is believed to be a year-round resident throughout its range.

=== Feeding ===
The Rio Suno antwren's diet is not known in detail but is probably mostly insects and spiders. It forages singly, in pairs, or in family groups, and usually as part of a mixed-species feeding flock. It typically forages in dense vegetation mostly between about 1 and 7 m (3 and 20 ft) above the ground. It seeks prey less actively and acrobatically than other antwrens, mostly by gleaning leaves, and also takes prey from clusters of dead leaves, vine tangles, and along branches.

=== Breeding ===
Nothing is known about the Rio Suno antwren's breeding biology.

=== Vocalization ===
The Rio Suno antwren's song is "a clear, melodic 'wi-weedy-weedy-weedy' ". Its call is "a thin, upslurred 'wheet' " that is often doubled.

== Status ==
The IUCN has assessed the Rio Suno antwren as being of Least Concern. Its population size is not known and is believed to be decreasing. No immediate threats have been identified. It is considered rare to uncommon in its several ranges. It occurs in a few protected areas "but more survey work is needed in order to permit a better assessment of the true distributional limits and status of this species".
