= William Frederick Lake Price =

English watercolourist and photographer (1810–1896)

William Frederick Lake Price (1810–1896) was an English watercolourist and an innovator in mid-nineteenth-century photography.

Lake Price was trained as a topographical and architectural artist by the architect Augustus Charles Pugin. Lake Price exhibited his paintings and watercolours at the Royal Academy and the Royal Watercolour Society. In the 1850s he joined the London Photographic Society and the Photographic Exchange Club of London. In 1858, many of his photographic portraits were published in Portraits of Eminent British Artists.

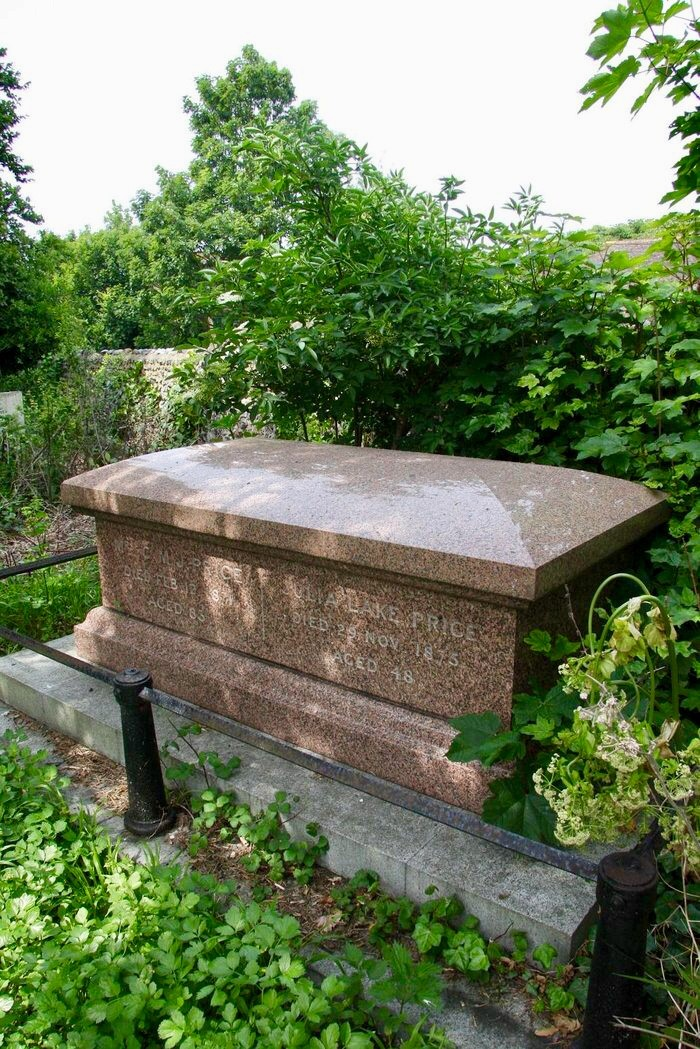
The grave of William Frederick Lake Price in the churchyard of St Peter's, Kent
