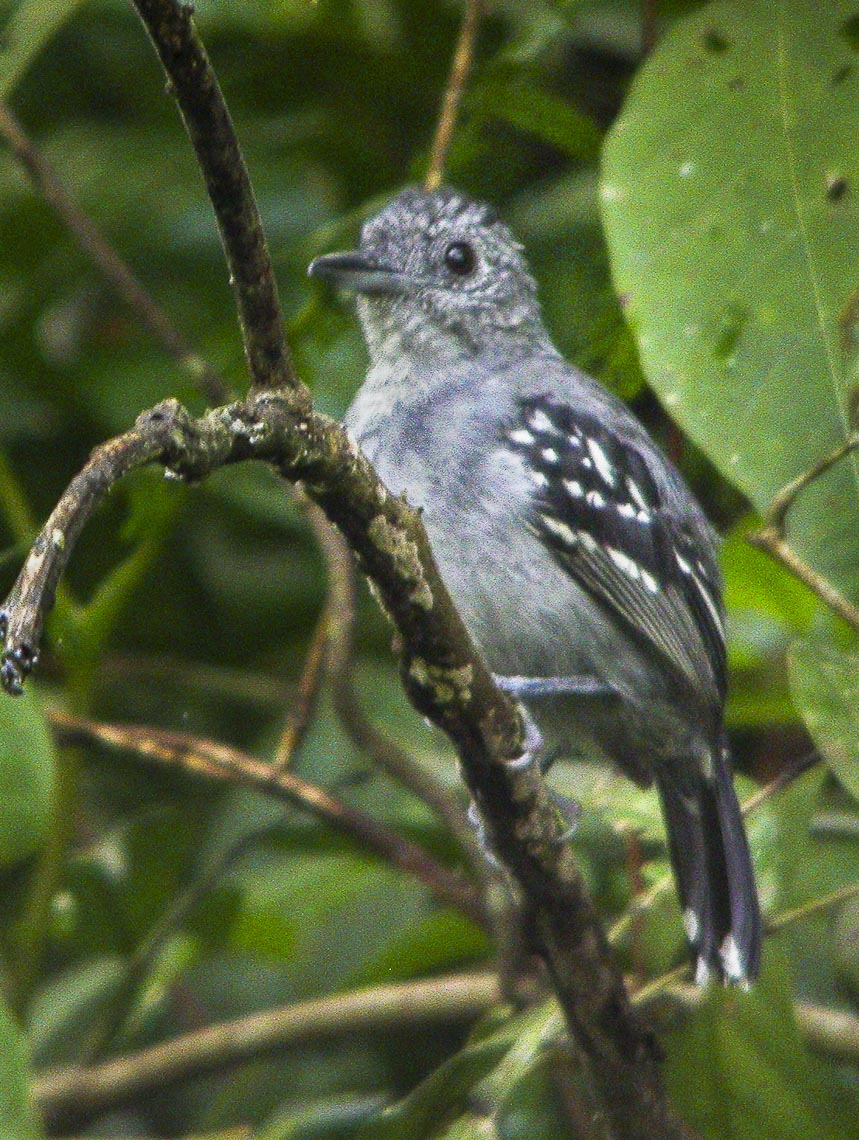

Conservation status
- Least Concern (IUCN 3.1)

Scientific classification
- Kingdom: Animalia
- Phylum: Chordata
- Class: Aves
- Order: Passeriformes
- Family: Thamnophilidae
- Genus: Myrmotherula
- Species: M. schisticolor

Binomial name
- Myrmotherula schisticolor (Lawrence, 1865)

= Slaty antwren =

Species of bird

The slaty antwren (Myrmotherula schisticolor) is a small passerine bird in subfamily Thamnophilinae of family Thamnophilidae, the "typical antbirds". It is found from Mexico south through Central America, Colombia, Ecuador, Peru, and Venezuela.

== Taxonomy and systematics ==
The slaty antwren has three subspecies, the nominate M. s. schisticolor (Lawrence, 1865), M. s. sanctaemartae (Allen, JA, 1900), and M. s. interior (Chapman, 1914).

The slaty antwren, Rio Suno antwren (M. sunensis), and Salvadori's antwren (M. minor) have similar morphology, behavior, and voices and may form a monophyletic group.

== Description ==
The slaty antwren is 9 to 12 cm (3.5 to 4.7 in) long and weighs 8.5 to 10 g (0.30 to 0.35 oz). It is a smallish bird with a short tail. Adult males of the nominate subspecies are mostly dark gray with a hidden white patch between the shoulders. Their tail is dark gray with thin white edges to the feathers. Their wings are dark gray with white tips on the coverts. Their throat and upper breast are black; their crissum is dark gray with whitish tips on the feathers. Adult females have grayish olive upperparts with a browner tail. Their wings are browner than the back with rufous edges on the coverts. Their throat is pale cinnamon, their sides and flanks olive-brown, and the rest of their underparts tawny-tinged cinnamon that becomes yellowish brown on the crissum.

Males of subspecies M. s. sanctaemartae are much paler than nominate males, with browner edging on the flight feathers. The black on their underside is only on the throat and center of the uppermost breast. Females have much grayer upperparts and more yellowish-brown underparts than nominate females. Males of subspecies M. s. interior are intermediate between those of the nominate and sanctaemartae. Their white shoulder patch is small. Females are darker and more blue-gray than sanctaemartae females, with tawny-tinged cinnamon underparts.

== Distribution and habitat ==
The slaty antwren has a disjunct distribution. The nominate subspecies is by far the most widely distributed. One population of it is found from Chiapas in extreme southeastern Mexico through Guatemala, southern Belize, and the Caribbean slope of Honduras into northern Nicaragua. Another is found mostly on the Pacific slope through Costa Rica and spottily through Panama. A third population extends from Colombia's Western Andes south on most of Ecuador's Pacific slope. Subspecies M. s. sanctaemartae is found in Colombia's isolated Sierra Nevada de Santa Marta, in the Serranía del Perijá on the Colombian-Venezuelan border, and in the Venezuelan Andes and Coastal Ranges. Subspecies M. s. interior is found on the western slope of Colombia's Central Andes, in Coloimbia's Eastern Andes, and south on the eastern Andean slope through Ecuador and Peru almost to the Bolivian border.

The slaty antwren inhabits a variety of moist forested landscapes, generally at higher elevations than most others of its genus. In most of its range it occurs in foothill and montane evergreen forest, where it favors cloudforest, and in nearby secondary woodland. Along the Pacific slope from Costa Rica south and on the Caribbean slope in Venezuela it occurs in semi-humid forest. In Central America it generally ranges between sea level and 1,250 m (4,100 ft), though in Costa Rica it reaches 2,000 m (6,600 ft). In Colombia it ranges between 1,000 and 2,300 m (3,300 and 7,500 ft). In western Ecuador it mostly occurs between 400 and 1,450 m (1,300 and 4,800 ft) and in the east 900 and 1,700 m (3,000 and 5,600 ft).

== Behavior ==
=== Movement ===
The slaty antwren is believed to be a year-round resident throughout its range.

=== Feeding ===
The slaty antwren's diet is not known in detail but is probably mostly insects and spiders. It forages singly, in pairs, or in family groups, and often as part of a mixed-species feeding flock. It typically forages in dense vegetation mostly between about 1 and 6 m (3 and 20 ft) above the ground, but also on the ground and as high as 12 m (40 ft) above it. It actively seeks prey mostly by gleaning leaves, and also takes prey from clusters of dead leaves, vine tangles, and along branches by gleaning, reaching, lunging, and with short sallies from a perch. It will chase dislodged prey to the ground. There are two records of the species following army ant swarms.

=== Breeding ===
The slaty antwren's breeding season has not been defined but appears to vary geographically. In Costa Rica it breeds between March and July; its season in Venezuela includes January and February. Its nest is a deep cup made of thinly woven fungal rhizomorphs bound by spider silk. It is typically suspended by its rim from a branch fork or between two parallel branches in a small tree up to about 2 m (7 ft) above the ground. The clutch size is two eggs which are white or cream with reddish or purplish markings. At one nest the incubation period was about 15 days; both parents incubated during the day and the female alone at night. The time to fledging was about nine days and both parents provisioned the nestlings.

=== Vocalization ===
The slaty antwren's song is an "upslurred whistle sounding like 'wheet' " that is given as single notes a couple of seconds apart or more quickly as two to four interations. Its calls include a "downslurred nasal whine", the "same type of note turned into nasal 'chirr' by overtones", and "sharp 'chip' notes" that are sometimes repeated as a twitter.

== Status ==
The IUCN has assessed the slaty antwren as being of Least Concern. It has a very large range and an estimated population of at least 50,000 mature individuals, though the latter is believed to be decreasing. No immediate threats have been identified. It is considered uncommon to fairly common in different parts of its range and occurs in many protected areas. "The foothill and middle-elevation slopes favoured by this species are often subject to the most intensive pressure from human colonization and cultivation, which could place some of its populations at risk."
