= Barking owl =

Conservation status
- Least Concern (IUCN 3.1)
- CITES Appendix II

Scientific classification
- Kingdom: Animalia
- Phylum: Chordata
- Class: Aves
- Order: Strigiformes
- Family: Strigidae
- Genus: Ninox
- Species: N. connivens

Binomial name
- Ninox connivens (Latham, 1801)

Audio
- Calls recorded in Marong, Victoria

Species of owl

The barking owl (Ninox connivens) or barking boobook, also known as the winking owl, is a nocturnal bird species native to mainland Australia and parts of New Guinea and the Moluccas. They are medium-sized brown owls and have a characteristic voice with calls ranging from a barking dog noise to an intense human-like howl.

== Etymology ==
The owl takes its name from its characteristic barking voice. For a short period before 2016, the Red List of Threatened Species referred to this species as the "barking boobook". However, this is not used as a common name in Australia or other English speaking areas in this species' range and has now been corrected to barking owl. The Yanyuwa name for the owl is mulurrku.

== Taxonomy ==
The barking owl was first described by the English ornithologist John Latham in 1801 with the binomial name Falco connivens. Latham commented that the species "Inhabits New Holland, but no history annexed, further than that it has a wonderful faculty of contracting and dilating the iris: and that the native name is Goora-a-Gang." The specific epithet is the Latin connivens 'winking'.

There are five subspecies:

- N. c. rufostrigata (Gray, GR, 1861) - north Maluku Islands
- N. b. remigialis Stresemann, 1930 - Kai Islands. Stresemann described it in 1930 from a specimen collected in 1909. Poorly known, it has been recorded twice more in 1998 and 2010.
- N. c. assimilis Salvadori & D'Albertis, 1875 - east New Guinea, Manam, Karkar and Daru Islands
- N. c. peninsularis Salvadori, 1876 - north Australia
- N. c. connivens (Latham, 1801) - southwest, east and southeast Australia

N. b. remigialis was formerly considered a subspecies of the Australian boobook (N. boobook) but was transferred to N. connivens by the International Ornithological Congress in 2022.

== Description ==

The barking owl is coloured brown with white spots on its wings and a vertically streaked chest. They have large eyes that have a yellow iris, a discrete facial mask and yellow skin on the feet. Their underparts are brownish-grey and coarsely spotted white with their tail and flight feathers being strongly banded brown and white. They are a robust, medium-sized owl 39–44 cm (15–17 in) long and their wingspan is between 85 and 120 cm (33 and 47 in). They weigh between 380 and 960 g (13 and 34 oz)^{[p20]} Size varies only slightly between the male and female birds with the male barking owl being 8-10 % heavier. In a banding study conducted in the Pilliga forests of northern New South Wales, males averaged 824 g (29.1 oz) with females averaging 745 g (26.3 oz)^{[p20]}. In Australia, the smallest barking owls are found on Cape York Peninsula and the largest in southern Australia.

== Distribution and habitat ==
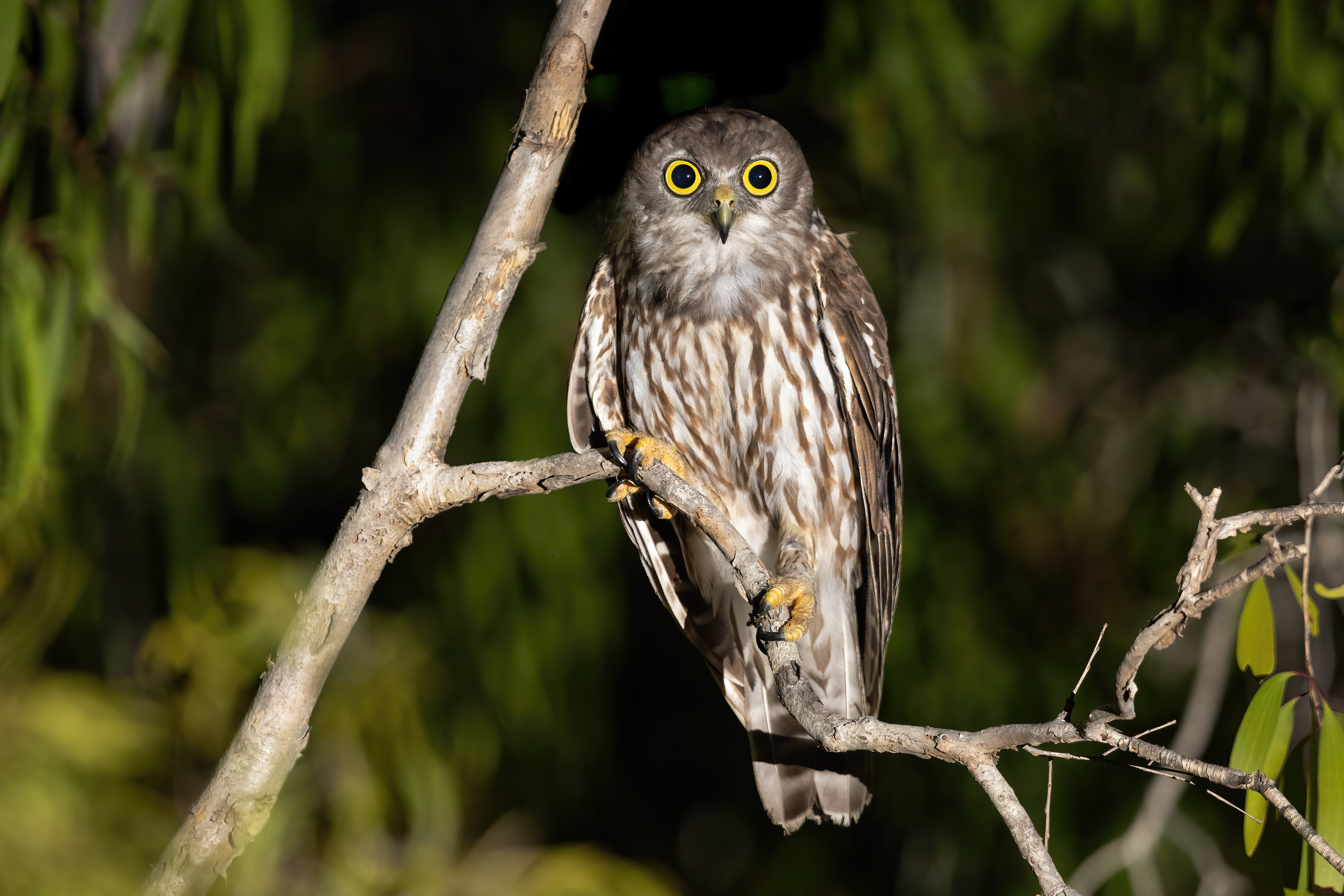

The barking owl lives in mainland Australia along the eastern and northern coast of the continent and the southwest areas surrounding Perth, Western Australia. Inland they occupy areas near lakes and waterways or other wooded environments. They also live in drier parts of New Guinea and the Moluccas (Halmahera, Morotai, Bacan and Obi). Once widespread, barking owls are now less common in southern mainland Australia. They choose to live in forests or woodland areas that have large trees for nesting and foliage cover for roosting. They often reside near river, swamp or creek beds as these features often have large trees with hollows required for nesting and the productivity to support sufficient prey. The only detailed studies of barking owl home-ranges have been conducted in southern Australia where the species is declining. In northern Victoria, barking owl pairs were found to average a home-range of 1,424 ha (3,520 acres) with little overlap between pairs. Foraging was concentrated within forested areas of each home range. These results are mirrored in the Pilliga forests of northern NSW although there the home ranges were larger, often up to 2,500 ha (6,200 acres).

== Behaviour ==
=== Diet ===
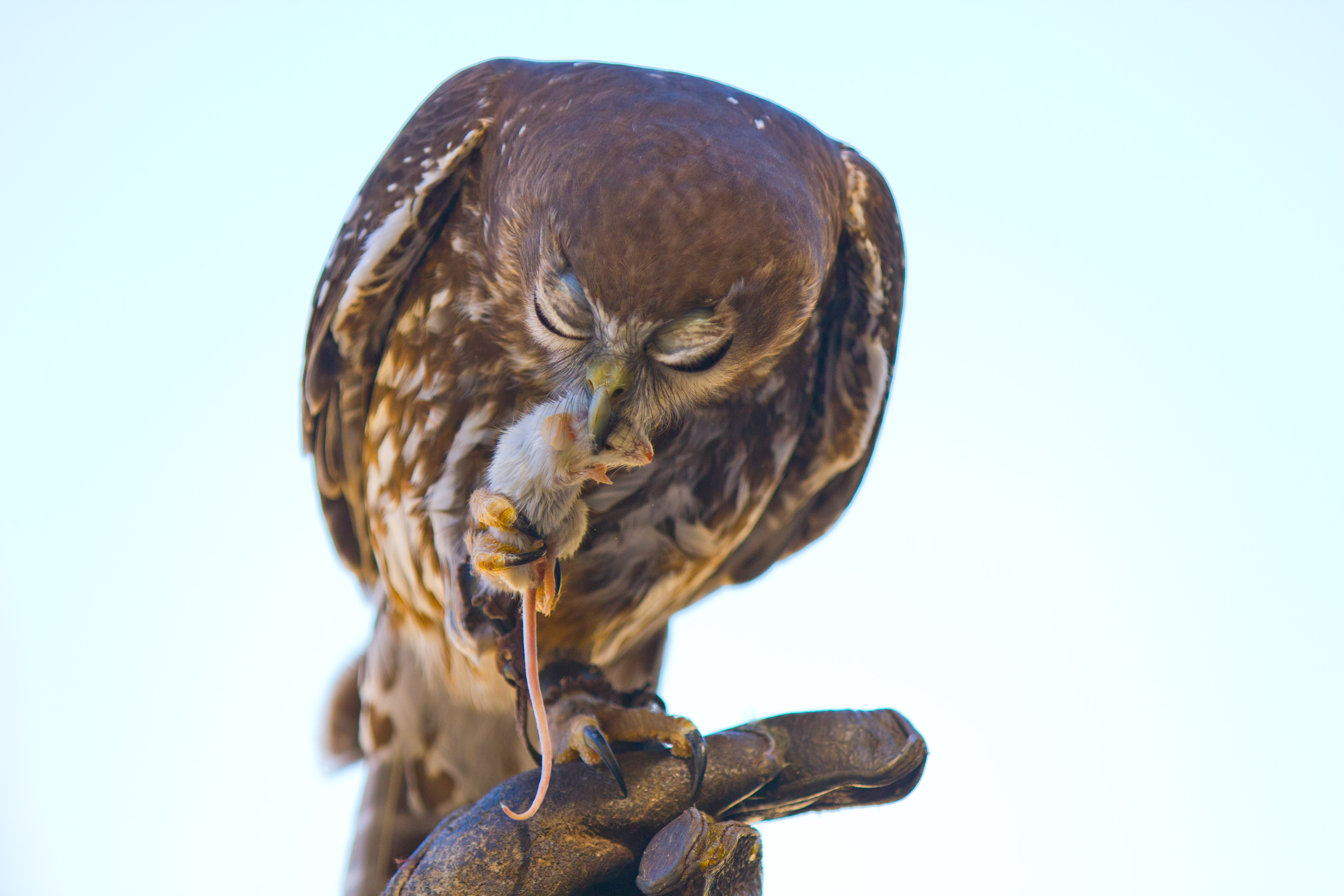
Rocket, the Barking Owl enjoying her reward after performing in the Birds of Prey display at Lone Pine Koala Sanctuary

The barking owl has one of the broadest diets of any Australian owl. Barking owls hunt in timbered and open habitats but usually rely on trees as hunting perches. Their diet includes prey taken from the ground, the trees, the surface of waterbodies, and directly from the air. In some locations mammals make up the majority of prey biomass with prey sizes from mice, rats, and small carnivorous marsupials up to rabbits, young hares, and brushtail possums around a kilogram or more in weight. Sugar gliders are a frequent prey item. Bats of all sizes are also commonly taken. It also occasionally takes house cats.

In some areas, bird prey items make a sizeable contribution to the diet. Birds up to the size of Australian magpies, sulphur-crested cockatoos (~800 grams), and ducks are taken, but many smaller roosting birds, such as passerines, are more commonly taken. One frequent prey item is the tawny frogmouth, a nocturnal bird of Australian forests and woodlands. Insect prey items can dominate the prey item count. Beetles and moths are commonly taken on the wing. A range of other insects are also consumed. Occasionally frogs, reptiles, fish or crustaceans are eaten. In summary, if an animal can be detected by a barking owl and it is of its size or smaller, it can be considered as potential prey.^{[pp8–11, 35-77]}

=== Breeding ===
The breeding season of the barking owl is from July to September in the north of Australia and from August to October in the south. The nest is formed of decayed debris, usually in the large hollow of an old eucalypt near a river. A clutch of 2 or 3 roundish, dull-white eggs, each measuring 48 by 38 mm (1.9 by 1.5 in), is laid and incubated by the female for about 36 days. The young at first are covered in white down and fledge by 5 to 6 weeks.

=== Voice ===
Most people hear the barking owl rather than see it as it has a loud and explosive voice. The main territorial vocalisation is in the form of a double 'hoot', similar in pattern to the other Australian hawk owls. It sounds like a double dog bark, so closely resembling a small dog that it is difficult to tell the difference. The barking owl name is derived from these calls. Males 'bark' at a lower pitch than females, particularly when a pair perform the barking calls together. Barking calls can be varied in pitch and intensity depending on the purpose of the call. Loud barks are given as territorial calls and can be used in confrontations between pairs in adjacent territories. Lower pitched softer barks are often used around the nest or roost areas by the male to call the female for a meal.

Barking owls also have a range of other vocalisations. These might be described as growls, howls or screams and bleating and twittering. Growls and howls are part of a continuum of calls relating to threats, particularly during nesting. The level of the threat, typically determines the level of the call, with the lowest level being a low pitched and soft growl. This is usually a warning note to the nesting partner. This climbs into a louder and higher pitched series of howls, often made while the owl dives at the intruder. At its most extreme, this might be described as a scream. The screaming of the barking owl is said to sound like a woman or child screaming in pain. Hearings of 'screaming lady,' as it is so nicknamed, are rare and many only hear the sound once in their life even if they live next to a barking owl nest. While screams are usually related to nest defence, some barking owls will make this call in non-nest related situations. Myths surround the events that caused the owl to originally "mimic" the sounds.

Juvenile barking owls have a twittering, insect-like call when begging for food. It is similar to that of other juvenile hawk owls. Female barking owls will often make a gentle bleating sound when receiving food from the male owl. An excited variation of this sound is made during copulation.

== Conservation status ==
Barking owls are not listed as threatened on the Australian Environment Protection and Biodiversity Conservation Act 1999.

However, their conservation status varies from state to state within Australia. For example:

- The barking owl is listed as 'Threatened' on the Victorian Flora and Fauna Guarantee Act (1988). Under this Act, an Action Statement for the recovery and future management of this species has been prepared.
- On the 2007 advisory list of threatened vertebrate fauna in Victoria, the barking owl is listed as endangered.
- The barking owl was listed as 'Vulnerable' under the NSW Threatened Species Conservation Act 1995. This listing was transferred to the equivalent schedules under the Biodiversity Conservation Act 2016 (NSW) from August 2017.
- The Action Plan for Australian Birds 2010 lists the barking owl southern sub-species as 'near threatened'.

=== Decline and extent ===
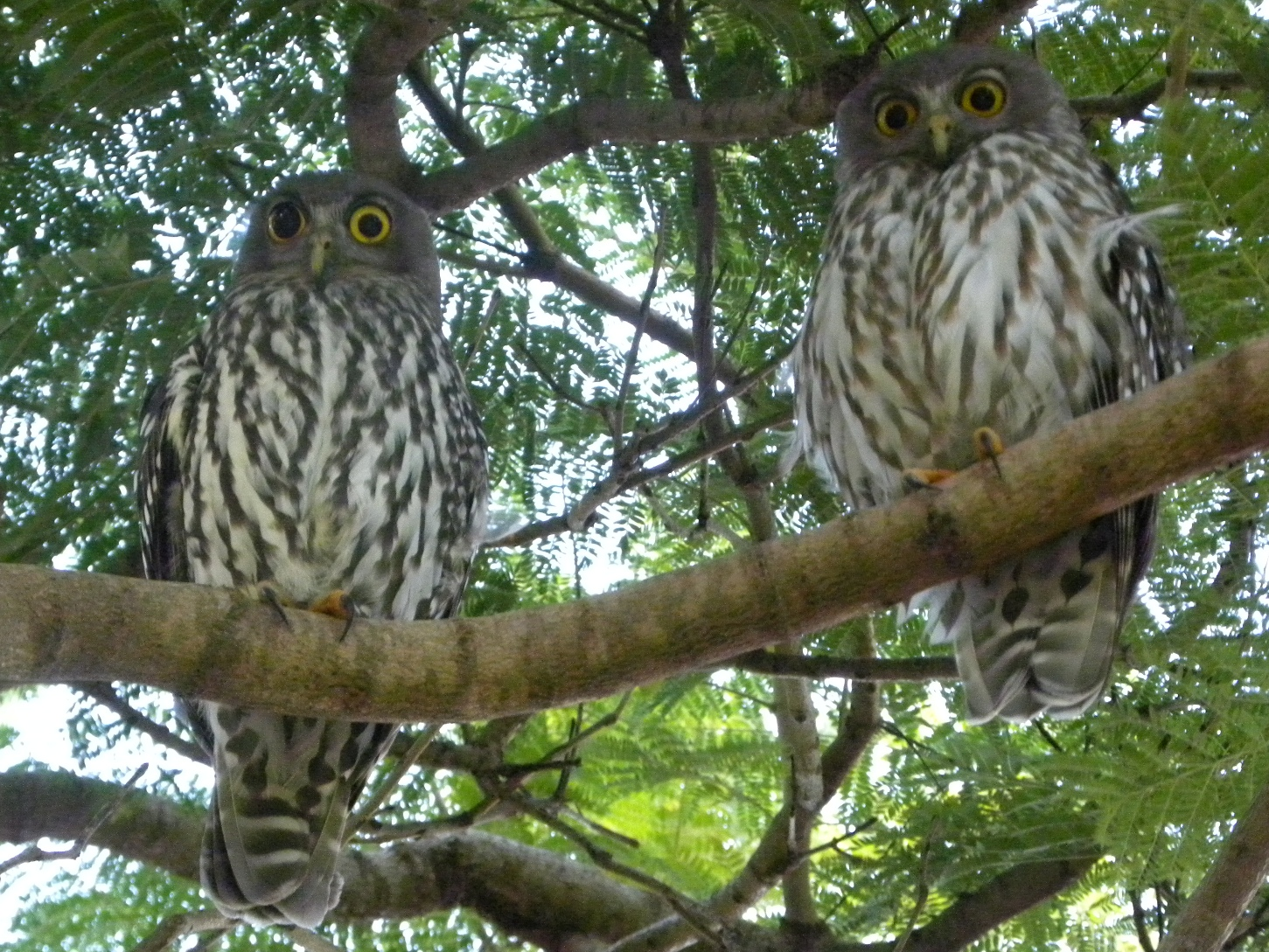
Adult barking owl and offspring - photographed in Central Queensland

In the State of Victoria, according to Action Statement 116 issued under the FFG Act: "The Barking Owl is the most threatened owl in Victoria. The population has been estimated to be fewer than 50 breeding pairs (Silveira et al. 1997), though work in north-eastern Victoria (Taylor et al. 1999;) suggests that this estimate may have been conservative in the late 1990s and early 2000s. Existing records of Barking Owls on the Atlas of Victorian Wildlife database (NRE 2001) are unlikely to give an accurate representation of the current distribution and abundance of the species. Many of these records are dated, occurring in areas where once-suitable habitat has been lost or degraded. Extensive surveys in Victorian forests have shown the species to be rare, localised and mainly found in north-eastern Victoria (Loyn et al. 2001)." A similar pattern of decline is evident in NSW with surveys in 1998, 2004 and 2008 showing barking owls to be rare in areas that had been assumed to be strongholds. Larger population areas have been demonstrated to be isolated from one another. In south-western Australia a survey (in the late 1990s) of 100 forest sites found no barking owls. In contrast (as of 2012), barking owl calls are still a common sound in many wooded parts of Queensland and the Northern Territory, although there have been few recent published population studies/surveys in those areas.

=== Threatening processes ===
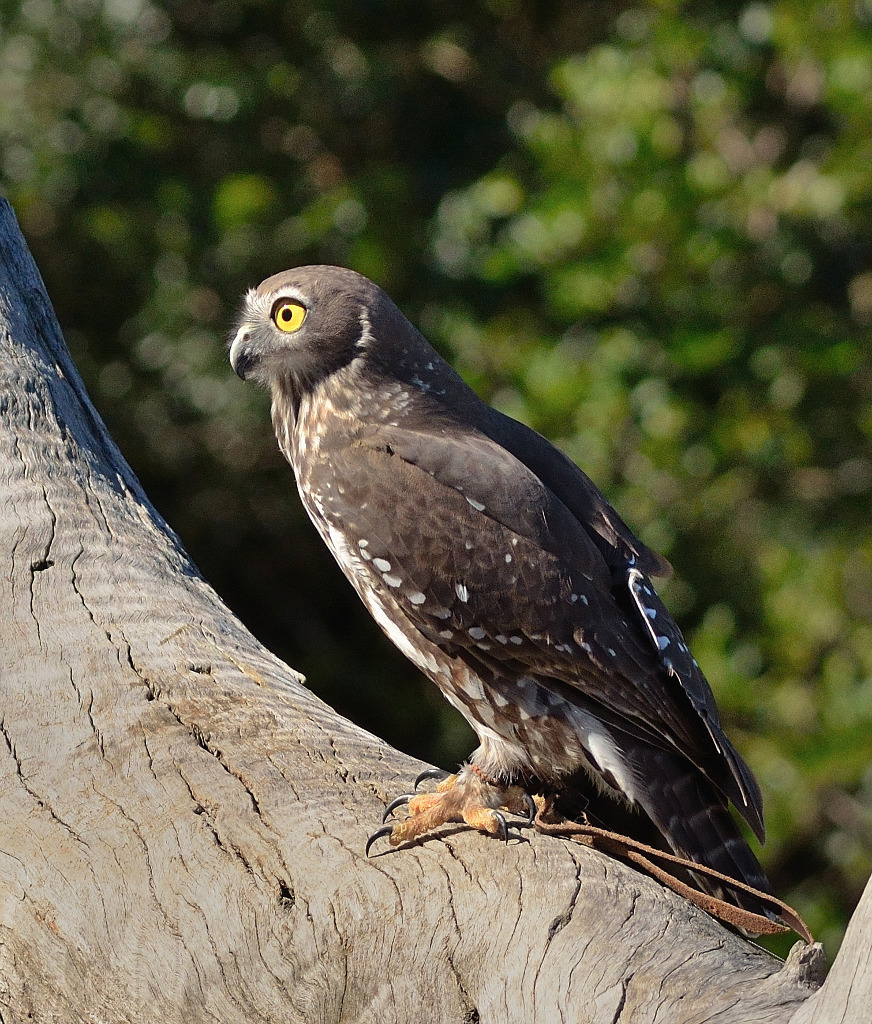

According to the Action Statement No. 116 made under the state of Victoria, the primary threat to the barking owl is loss of habitat, particularly the deterioration or loss of the large, hollow-bearing trees on which the species depends for nesting. Hollows suitable for nesting for owls do not form in eucalypts until they are at least 150–200 years old.

Similarly, hollows are an important resource for many prey species of the barking owl, e.g. gliders and possums. Such trees are not being regrown rapidly enough to exceed expected losses in the next century. The removal of dead, standing trees and stags for firewood is also likely to remove nesting sites for the species. Native prey species such as arboreal mammals and hollow-nesting birds have declined in some areas through clearing of native vegetation, loss of hollows and the impact of introduced predators. These declines may also have contributed to the decline of the barking owl, although in some areas European rabbits have become a substitute prey, and local populations of the barking owl have become heavily dependent upon them. It is not known how the owls will fare through periods of rabbit decline due to climate fluctuations, control programs or disease such as calicivirus. Where poisons are used to control rabbits, secondary poisoning of owls may be an issue.

== Mythology ==
In the early settlement of Australia a screaming noise matching the barking owl's description was credited and told to the settlers by the Indigenous Australians or the Aboriginals as the bunyip. The bunyip was said to be a fearsome creature that inhabited swamps, rivers and billabongs. Bunyips had many different descriptions but most were of an animal of some sort whose favorite food was human women. The cries and noises coming from swamps and creeks at night were not said to be the victims but actually the noise the bunyip made. It is believed by many that the sound is of the nocturnal barking owl and that proves the location, the noises and the rarity of the bunyip cries. It is still not proven though that the barking owl actually started the bunyip story and it could be due to other sources. But it seems that the barking owl will stay as the most likely explanation. Myths surround the events that caused the owl to originally "mimic" the screaming sounds.
