= Tommaso Salvadori =

Italian zoologist and ornithologist

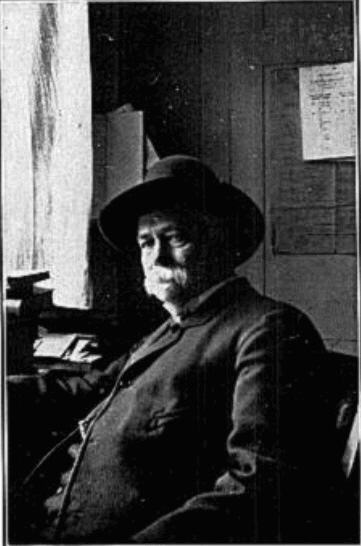
- Tommaso Salvadori
- Born: 30 September 1835; Porto San Giorgio, Papal States
- Died: 9 October 1923 (aged 88); Turin, Italy
- Scientific career
- Fields: Zoology and ornithology

Count Adelardo Tommaso Salvadori Paleotti (30 September 1835 – 9 October 1923) was an Italian zoologist and ornithologist.

== Biography ==
Salvadori was born in Porto San Giorgio, son of Count Luigi Salvadori and Ethelyn Welby, who was English. His brother Giorgio married their cousin Adele Emiliani (daughter of Giacomo Emiliani and Casson Adelaide Welby) and had five children (Charlie, Robbie, Minnie, Nellie and Guglielmo "Willie"). His nephew Guglielmo Salvadori Paleotti married Giacinta Galletti de Cadilhac (daughter of Arturo Galletti de Cadilhac and Margaret Collier) and had three children (Gladys, Massimo "Max" and Gioconda Beatrice "Joyce"). He studied medicine in Pisa and Rome and graduated in medicine at the University of Pisa.

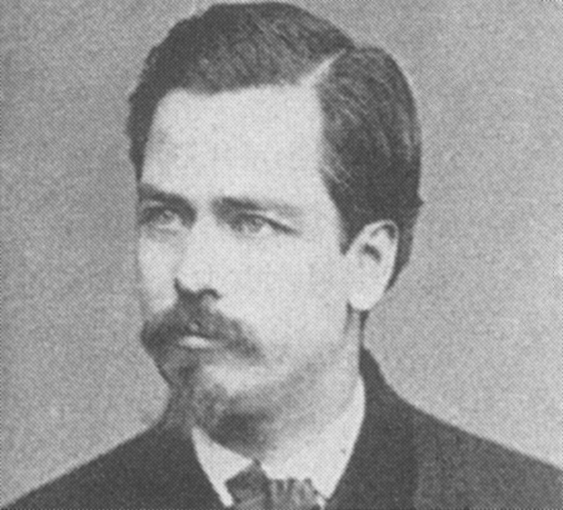
Tommaso Salvadori

He participated in Garibaldi's military expedition in Sicily (the Expedition of the Thousand), serving as a medical officer.

He was assistant in the Museum of Zoology in 1863, becoming Vice-Director of the Royal Museum of Natural History in Turin in 1879.

== Naturalist ==
Tommaso Salvadori took an early interest in birds and published a catalogue of the birds of Sardinia in 1862.

He was a specialist in birds of Asia. He studied the wide collections of birds of these regions held by the Museo Civico di Storia Naturale di Genova and the collections of East Indian birds at Paris, London, Berlin and Leyden.

In 1880, he was on leave to the British Museum of Natural History in London to work on three volumes of their Catalogue of the Birds.

Salvadori's pheasant (Lophura inornata) is named after him, as is also the crocodile monitor (Varanus salvadorii), which is also commonly known as Salvadori's monitor, the Papua monitor, or the artelia.

Many other species of birds are named after him, for example, Salvadori's fig parrot Psittaculirostris salvadorii, Yellow-capped pygmy parrot (Micropsitta keiensis), Salvadori nightjar (Caprimulgus pulchellus), Salvadori's antwren (Myrmotherula minor), Salvadori's eremomela (Eremomela salvadorii), Salvadori's seedeater (Serinus xantholaemus), Salvadori's teal (Salvadorina waigiuensis) and others.

He published as many as 300 papers in ornithology.

== Works ==
- Monografia del Gener Ceyx Lacépède. Torino (1869) (Atti della Accademia delle Scienze di Torino)
- Nuove specie di uccelli dei generi Criniger, Picus ed Homoptila Nov. Gen.. Torino (1871) (Atti della R. Accademia delle Scienze)
- Intorno al Cypselus horus . Torino (1872) (Atti della R. Accademia delle Scienze) coautore: O. Antinori
- Intorno ad un nuovo genere di Saxicola . Torino (1872) (Atti della R. Accademia delle Scienze) coautore: O. Antinori
- Nuova specie del Genere Hyphantornis . Torino (1873) (Atti della R. Accademia delle Scienze)
- Di alcune specie del Genere Porphyrio Briss.. Torino (1879) (Atti della R. Accademia delle Scienze)
- Ornitologia della Papuasia e delle Molucche. Torino (1879) (Atti della R. Accademia delle Scienze)
- Osservazioni intorno ad alcune specie del Genere Collocalia G.R. Gr.. Torino (1880) (Atti della R. Accademia delle Scienze)
- Collezioni ornitologiche fatte nelle isole del Capo Verde da Leonardo Fea. Annali Museo Civico di Storia Naturale di Genova (2) 20: 1–32. (1889)
- Catalogue of the Psittaci, or parrots, in the collection of the British museum. London (1891)
- Catalogue of the Columabe, or pigeons, in the collection of the British museum. London (1893)
- Catalogue of the Chenomorphae (Palamedeae, Phoenicopteri, Anseres) Crypturi and Ratitae in the collection of the British Museum. London (1895)
- Due nuove specie di Uccelli dell'Isola di S. Thomé e dell'Isola del Principe raccolte dal sig. Leonardo Fea. Bollettino della Società dei Musei di Zoologia ed Anatomia comparata della R. Università di Torino (1901)
- Uccelli della Guinea Portoghese raccolti da Leonardo Fea. Annali del Museo Civico di Storia Naturale di Genova (1901)
- Caratteri di due nuove specie di Uccelli di Fernando Po. Bollettino della Società dei Musei di Zoologia ed Anatomia comparata della R. Università di Torino (1903)
- Contribuzioni alla ornitologia delle Isole del Golfo di Guinea. Memorie della Reale Academia delle Scienze di Torino, serie II, tomo LIII (1903)
  - I – Uccelli dell'Isola del Principe
  - II – Uccelli dell'Isola di San Thomé
  - III – Uccelli di Anno-Bom e di Fernando Po

== Sources ==
- P. Passerin D'Entreves, A. Rolando, C. Violani Tommaso Salvadori nel centocinquantenario della nascita (1835–1923), Rivista Italiana di Ornitologia, II-56 3/4 133 (1986).
- E. Arrigoni Degli Oddi Cenni sulla vita e sulle opere di Tommaso Salvadori, Rivista Italiana di Ornitologia, I-6 2 66 (1923–24).
- G. Zanazzo, C. Violani, M. Pandolfi Studio della Collezione ornitologica personale di Tommaso Salvadori conservata a Fermo. Atti VII Convegno Nazionale di Ornitologia, Suppl. Ric.Biol. Selvaggina, XXII:15–21 (1995).
- M. Pandolfi, C. Violani, G. Zanazzo L'opera scientifica di Tommaso Salvadori. Città di Fermo, Fermo: 1–7 (1994).
