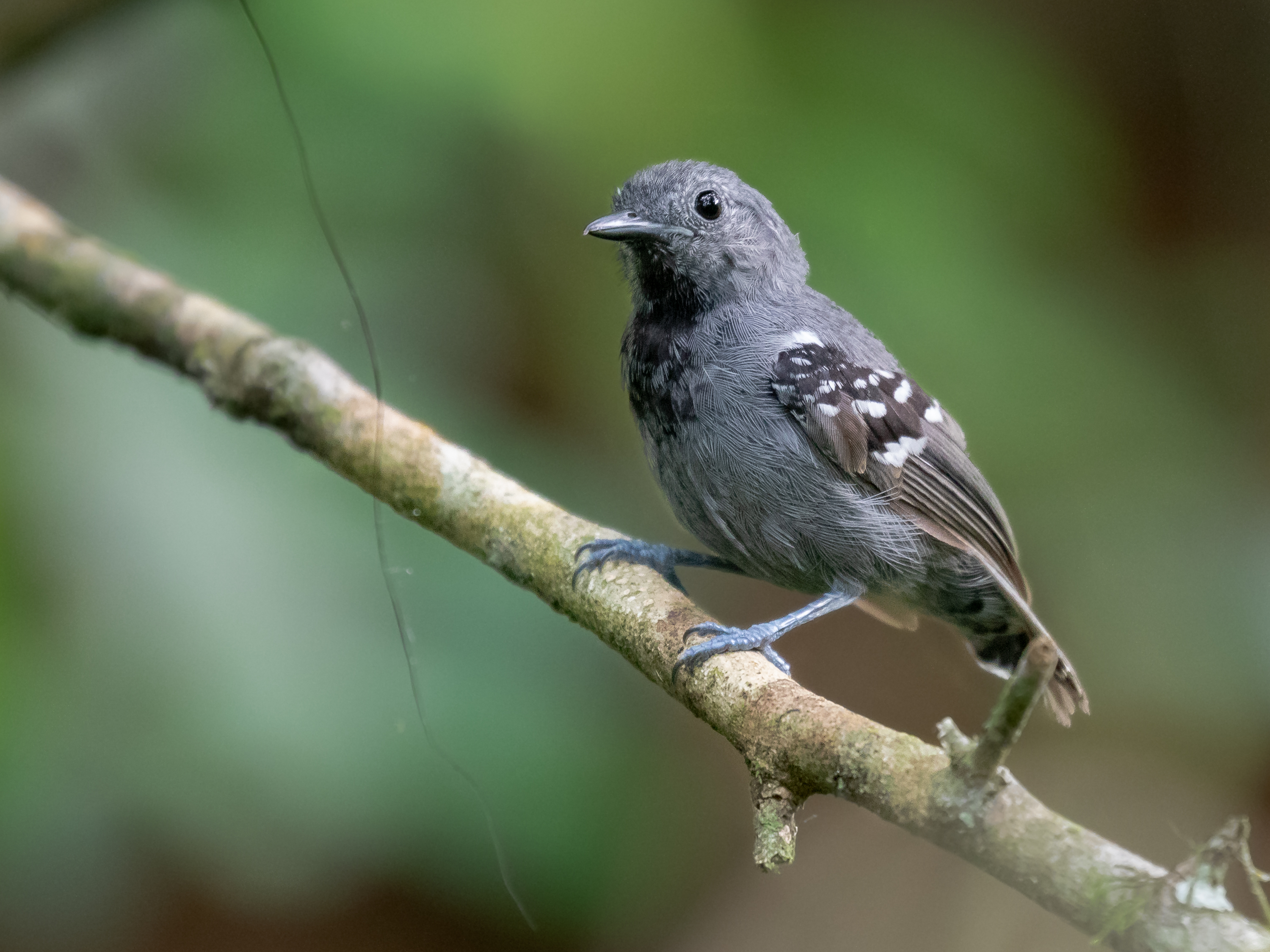

Conservation status
- Vulnerable (IUCN 3.1)

Scientific classification
- Kingdom: Animalia
- Phylum: Chordata
- Class: Aves
- Order: Passeriformes
- Family: Thamnophilidae
- Genus: Myrmotherula
- Species: M. minor

Binomial name
- Myrmotherula minor Salvadori, 1864

= Salvadori's antwren =

Species of bird in Brazil

Salvadori's antwren (Myrmotherula minor) is a species of bird in subfamily Thamnophilinae of family Thamnophilidae, the "typical antbirds". It is endemic to Brazil.

== Taxonomy and systematics ==
Salvadori's antwren is monotypic. It, the Rio Suno antwren (M. sunensis), and the slaty antwren (M. schisticolor) have similar morphology, behavior, and voices and may form a monophyletic group.

The species' English name honors Italian zoologist and ornithologist Tommaso Salvadori, who first described it.

== Description ==
Salvadori's antwren is about 9 cm (3.5 in) long. It is a smallish bird with a short tail. Adult males are mostly gray that is lighter on the underparts. Their tail is gray with a black band near the end and white tips on the feathers. Their wings are gray with white-tipped blackish coverts. Their throat and the center of the upper breast are black; their crissum has blackish bars. Adult females have a gray head and olive-brown upperparts. Their tail and wings are dull rufous-brown; the tail feathers have russet edges and the wing coverts thin buff edges. Their throat is dingy white and the rest of their underparts deep buff that is deepest on the flanks and crissum. Subadult males lack the adult's black band on the tail.

== Distribution and habitat ==
Salvadori's antwren is a bird of the Atlantic Forest. It found very spottily and locally in coastal eastern Brazil between Bahia and extreme northeastern Santa Catarina. It inhabits the understorey to mid-storey of evergreen forest and adjacent mature secondary forest in the lowlands and foothills. It favors the forest interior and usually occurs near running water. In elevation it mostly occurs below 500 m (1,600 ft) but is found as high as 900 m (3,000 ft).

== Behavior ==
=== Movement ===
Salvadori's antwren is believed to be a year-round resident throughout its range.

=== Feeding ===
The diet of Salvadori's antwren's diet is not known in detail but is probably mostly insects and spiders. It forages singly, in pairs, or in family groups, and usually as part of a mixed-species feeding flock. It typically forages around the crown and perimeter of trees with medium-size to large leaves. It feeds mostly between about 4 and 8 m (10 and 30 ft) above the ground but will go as low as 1 m (3 ft) and as high as 12 m (40 ft). It seeks prey mostly by gleaning live leaves, and also takes prey from clusters of dead leaves, moss, and hanging Usnea lichen.

=== Breeding ===
The breeding season of Salvadori's antwren includes October but is otherwise undefined. Nothing else is known about its breeding biology.

=== Vocalization ===
The song of Salvadori's antwren is "short twittering, starting extr. high, completed by liquid 'tyweet-tweet-tueet' ". Its calls include "variable...short whistles, given singly", "sharp chips, often in short series", and the same chips in a longer, more widely spaced, series.

== Status ==
The IUCN originally in 1988 assessed Salvadori's antwren as Threatened and since 1994 as Vulnerable. It has a small and fragmented range and its estimated population of 2500 to 10,000 mature individuals is believed to be decreasing. The primary threat is habitat destruction. "Virtually all lowland Atlantic forest outside protected areas has been deforested within its historical range, and even some of the protected areas in which it occurs are not secure." It is considered uncommon to rare and local. It does occur in some protected areas, but "most do not contain sufficient forest habitat in the relevant elevational range (below 300 m)".
