= Andries Hoogerwerf =

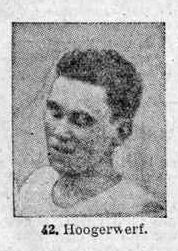
Andries Hoogerwerf in 1929

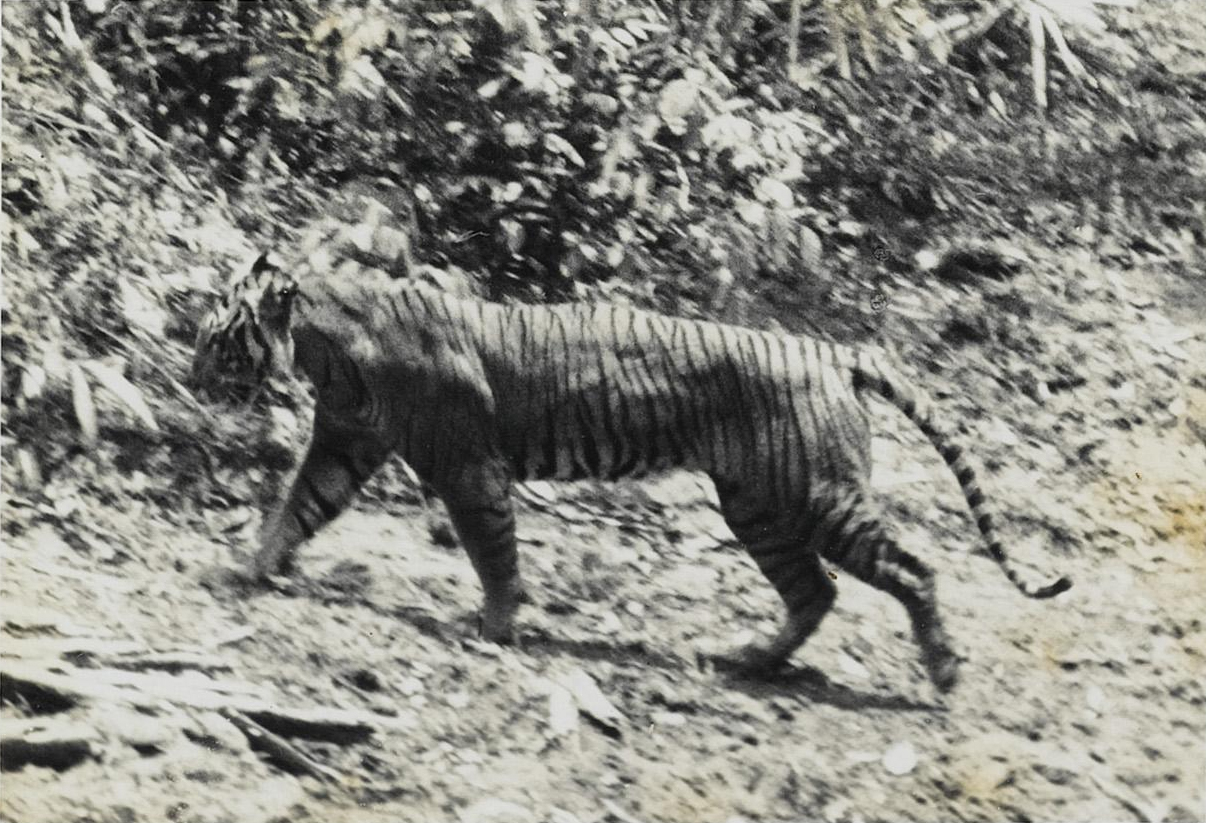
The now extinct Javan tiger photographed by Andries Hoogerwerf in 1938

Andries Hoogerwerf (29 August 1906 – 5 February 1977) was a Dutch track and field athlete, naturalist, ornithologist and conservationist, who spent much of his working life in the Dutch East Indies and Dutch New Guinea.

Hoogerwerf's athletics career lasted from the early 1920s until 1930, during which period he competed in middle-distance running events. In 1923 Hoogerwerf established his first Dutch national record, completing the 800 m in 1:56.6. In the 1000 m event he improved the Dutch record even three times, starting with 2:40.2 in 1929 and ending in 2:35.2 in 1930. In 1930 he finally also improved the Dutch 1500 m record from 4:10.6 into 4:08.6.

Hoogerwerf competed in the 1928 Summer Olympics in Amsterdam as a member of the Dutch 4 × 400 m relay team. The team was eliminated in the qualifications.

In 1927, 1929 and 1930 Andries Hoogerwerf was Dutch 800 m champion. Besides he was also a member of the 4 × 400 m relay team of his club HAV, that captured the Dutch title in 1926, 1927 and 1929.

In 1931 Hoogerwerf moved to Java in the Dutch East Indies (now Indonesia), where he worked at the Bogor Botanical Gardens. He was appointed the nature protection officer of the colony's nature reserves in 1935, and is especially associated with Ujung Kulon National Park, Indonesia's first, and the conservation of the Javan Rhinoceros.

Hoogerwerf returned to the Netherlands in 1957, although continuing to visit Indonesia. He was also stationed from October 1962 to April 1963 at the Agricultural Experimental Station at Manokwari in Dutch New Guinea, serving as its Scientific Officer. He eventually settled at the town of Castricum in the Netherlands, where he died of cardiac arrest in 1977. He is commemorated in the names of Hoogerwerf's rat (Rattus hoogerwerfi) and the Hoogerwerf's pheasant (Lophura hoogerwerfi).

== Publications ==
As well as numerous reports and some 250 scientific papers, books authored by Hoogerwerf include:

- 1938 – De avifauna van Batavia en omstreken. Leiden.
- 1949 – Bijdrage tot de oölogie van Java. Netherlands.
- 1949 – De avifauna van de Plantentuin te Buitenzorg (Java). Buitenzorg.
- 1949 – De Avifauna van Tjibodas en omgeving. Buitenzorg.
- 1953 – An Ornithological bibliography having particular reference to the study of the Birds of Java. Jakarta.
- 1967 – A further contribution to our oological knowledge of the Island of Java (Indonesia). Leiden. (with W.Ph.J. Hellebrekers).
- 1970 – Udjung Kulon: The Land of the Last Javan Rhinoceros. Brill: Leiden.
- selection of scientific papers written by A. Hoogerwerf and published in Leiden
