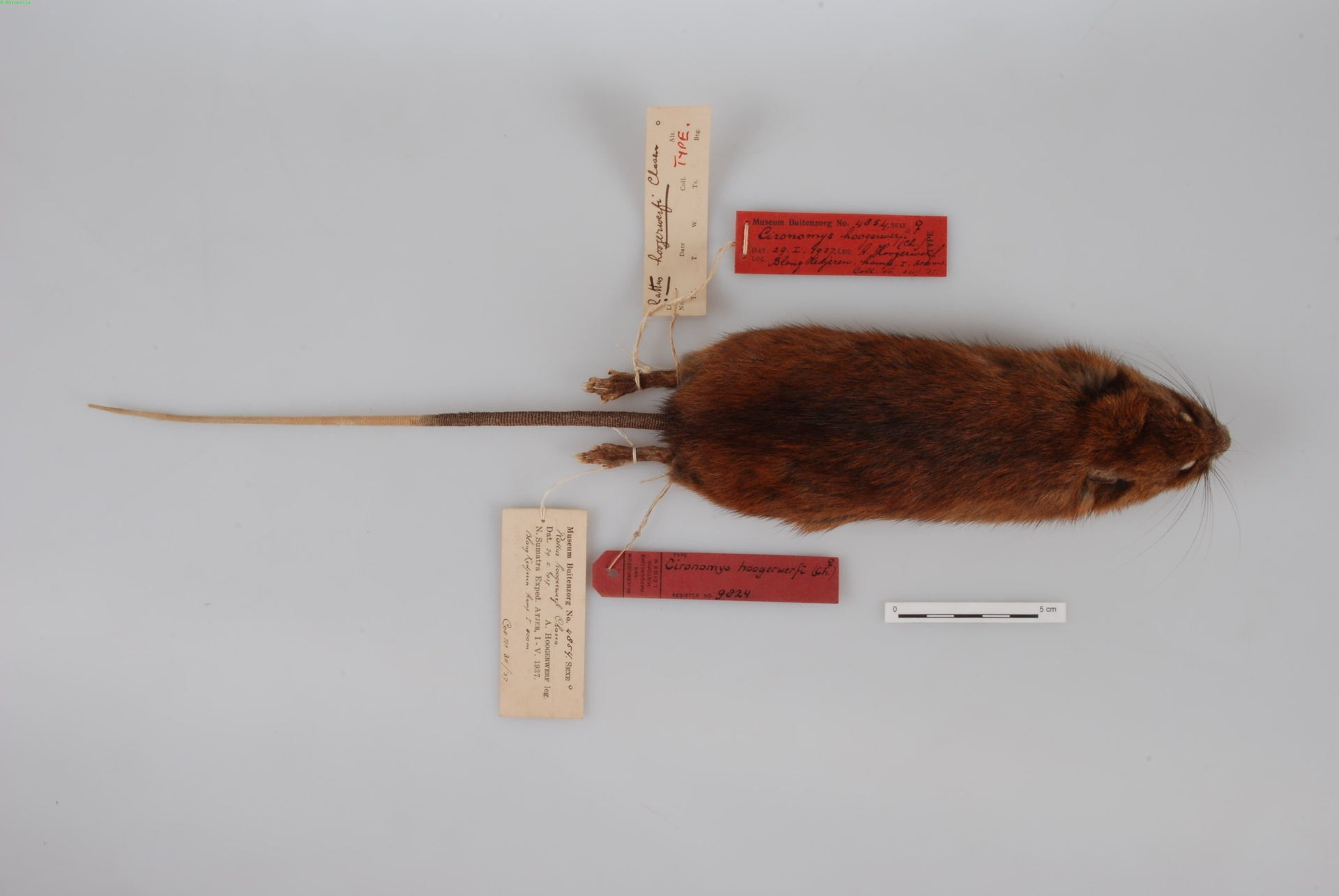

Conservation status
- Vulnerable (IUCN 3.1)

Scientific classification
- Kingdom: Animalia
- Phylum: Chordata
- Class: Mammalia
- Infraclass: Placentalia
- Order: Rodentia
- Family: Muridae
- Genus: Rattus
- Species: R. hoogerwerfi

Binomial name
- Rattus hoogerwerfi Chasen, 1939

= Hoogerwerf's rat =

Species of rodent

Hoogerwerf's rat (Rattus hoogerwerfi) is a species of rodent in the family Muridae. It is named after zoologist Andries Hoogerwerf and is found only in western Sumatra, Indonesia, including Mount Leuser, where it is found only above 2000 m. It is known from few museum specimens. Genetic analysis indicate its closest relative is Rattus korinchi, another Sumatran mountain rat from which it diverged around 1.4 million years ago.
