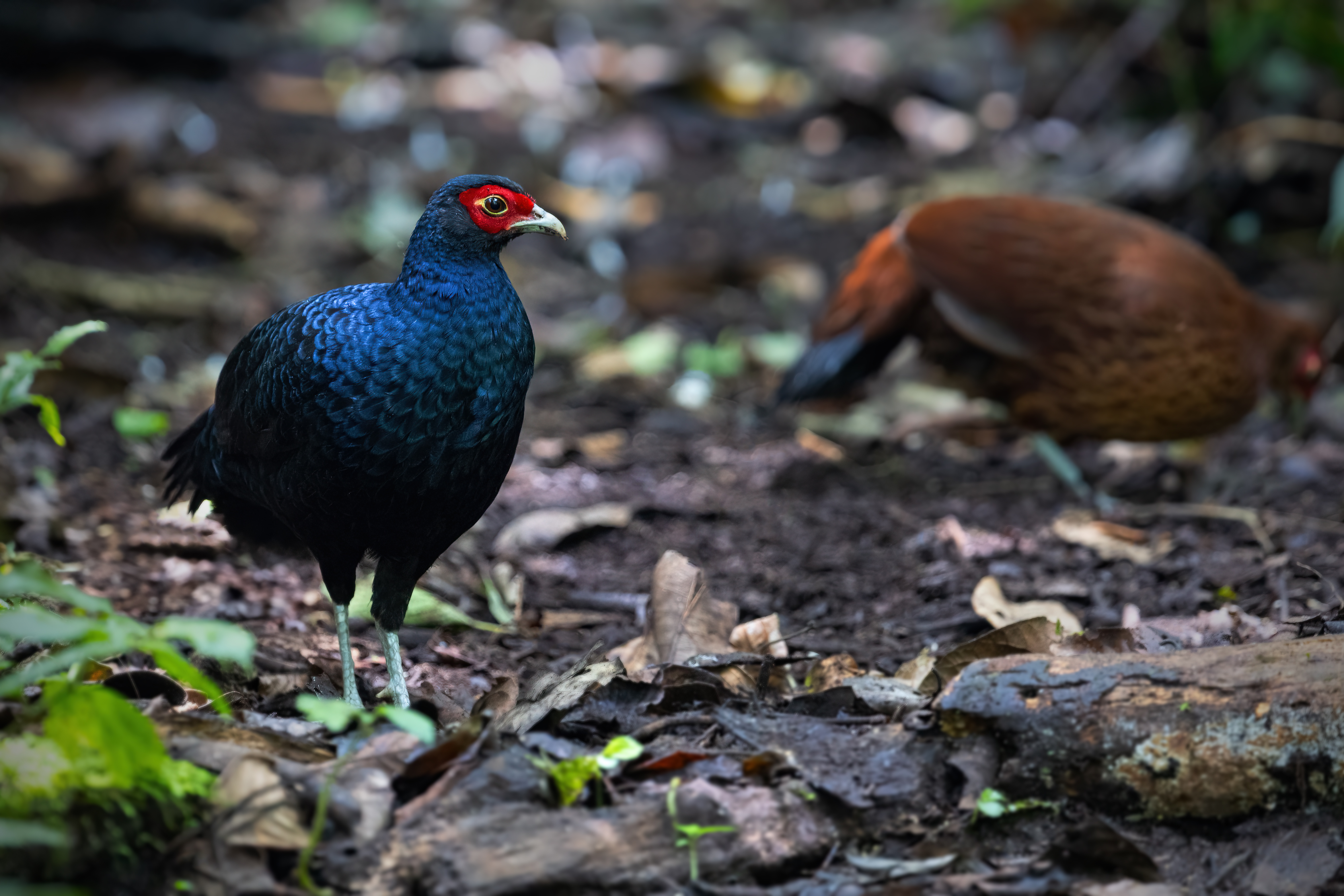
- Male
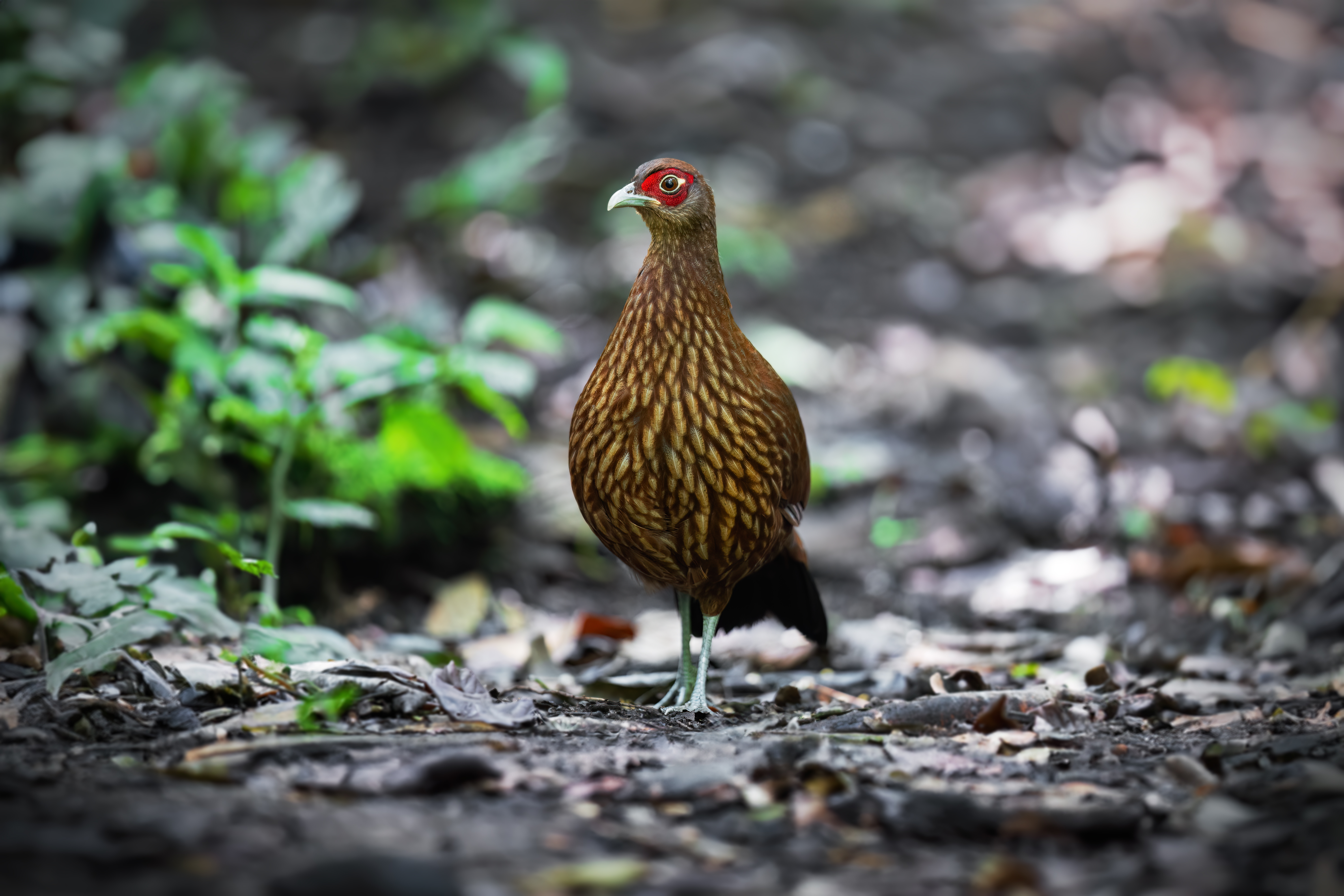
- Female

Conservation status
- Near Threatened (IUCN 3.1)

Scientific classification
- Kingdom: Animalia
- Phylum: Chordata
- Class: Aves
- Order: Galliformes
- Family: Phasianidae
- Genus: Lophura
- Species: L. inornata

Binomial name
- Lophura inornata (Salvadori, 1879)

= Salvadori's pheasant =

Species of bird

Salvadori's pheasant (Lophura inornata) is a landfowl bird of genus Lophura, native to Indonesia. It is found in the mountain rainforests of Sumatra. Thus it is also known as the Sumatran pheasant. This bird was first described in 1879 by the Italian ornithologist Tommaso Salvadori. The species name inornata means "without ornament". The Hoogerwerf's pheasant is usually thought to be a subspecies.

This species is classified as "near threatened" by the IUCN because of the reduction in its population size caused by the destruction of its habitat and hunting.

== Description ==
The male and female Salvadori's pheasant are quite unlike each other in appearance, and in fact the male bird is very similar to the female crestless fireback (Lophura erythrophthalma). The male Salvadori's pheasant is 46 to 55 cm (18 to 22 in) in length and is plain black, with a bluish fringe to the feathers of body and neck. The tail is short and rounded. The beak is whitish-green and the iris orange-red. There is a yellowish-green or grey-green ring of bare skin round the eye, and the rest of the bare facial skin is bright red. The legs are greyish-blue with a strong spur. The female is slightly shorter and has no spur. Her colour is reddish-brown, each feather having fine black speckling and a pale streak by the shaft, giving her a mottled look. The throat is paler brown and the tail is blackish-brown. Juveniles are similar to females but the feathers are edged with pale buff giving a scaled effect.

The principle differences between the male Salvadori's pheasant and the female crestless fireback is that the former is longer, has a pale bill and holds the tail lowered while the latter is more robust, has a black beak and tends to keep the tail cocked. Also, Salvadori's pheasant occurs at higher altitudes in Sumatra than the crestless fireback.

== Distribution and habitat ==
Salvadori's pheasant is endemic to Sumatra, Indonesia, where it is found at altitudes between about 650 and 2,200 m (2,130 and 7,220 ft). There are two subspecies; L. i. inornata being relatively common and known from many locations in the centre and south of the Barisan Mountains, while L. i. hoogerwerfi, Hoogerwerf's pheasant, is restricted to the northern part of the mountains and has been seen infrequently.

== Status ==
L. inornata is classified by the International Union for Conservation of Nature as a "near-threatened species". This is because the total population is thought to be trending downwards, it being estimated that there are between five thousand and twenty thousand individuals in total, and the bird's habitat is being degraded by the clearing of its forest home for illegal agricultural activities. Some birds are hunted and a few have appeared on sale in local markets, the vendors admitting that they had been poached from the Gunung Leuser National Park.
