= Hoogerwerf's pheasant =

Scientific classification
- Kingdom: Animalia
- Phylum: Chordata
- Class: Aves
- Order: Galliformes
- Family: Phasianidae
- Genus: Lophura
- Species: L. inornata
- Subspecies: L. i. hoogerwerfi

Trinomial name
- Lophura inornata hoogerwerfi (Chasen, 1939)

Subspecies of bird

Hoogerwerf's pheasant (Lophura inornata hoogerwerfi), also known as the Aceh pheasant or Sumatran pheasant, is a medium-sized, up to 55 centimetres (22 in) long, bird of the family Phasianidae. The name commemorates the Dutch ornithologist and taxidermist Andries Hoogerwerf. It is usually considered as a subspecies of the Salvadori's pheasant.

== Description ==
Males are a crestless bluish-black pheasant with bare red facial skin, short tail and grey legs. Its appearance resembles Salvadori's pheasant, with the male indistinguishable in the field. The female is a rufous brown bird with a dark bluish grey legs and short dark tail, and differs from Savadori's pheasant females for having darker brown, plainer plumage lacking buff mottling.

== Distribution and habitat ==
An Indonesian endemic, this little-known pheasant inhabits to mid-mountain forests of Gunung Leuser National Park in Aceh province. Previously known only from two female specimens, it was recently discovered in a market in Medan, North Sumatra.
