= Massimo Salvadori =

British-Italian historian and anti-Fascist

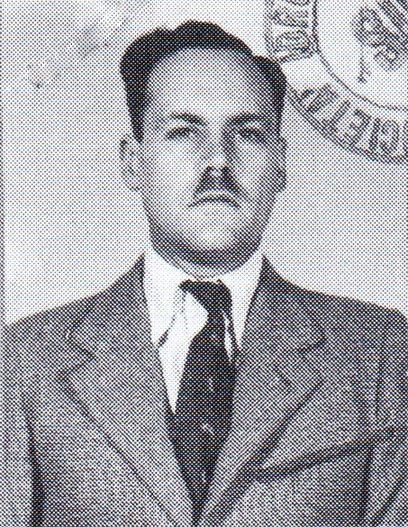
Massimo Salvadori

Massimo Salvadori, or Max William Salvadori Paleotti (16 June 1908, in London – 6 August 1992) was a British-Italian historian and anti-Fascist.

Salvadori was educated at the University of Geneva and the University of Rome. He was involved in the anti-Fascist movement in Italy before World War II. Imprisoned from 1931 to 1932 as a result of his political activities, Salvadori fled Italy for Switzerland. In 1943 he joined the British army and after participating in landings at Salerno and Anzio, parachuted into Italy to organize resistance. As agent of the British Special Operations Executive, Salvadori played a central role in providing weapons supplies for partisan formations and in pushing the Action Party to cooperate with the Italian Monarchy after the "svolta di Salerno" (1944). For this service, he was awarded the Military Cross and Distinguished Service Order. He served on the faculty of Smith College from 1945 until his retirement in 1973, with two notable breaks: in 1948-49 he was director of the Division of Political Science of UNESCO in France and in 1952 he worked as a political analyst for the Information Service of the Secretariat of NATO.

== Publications ==
- Salvadori, Massimo (1958). The labour and the wounds: a personal chronicle of one man's fight for freedom. London: Pall Mall.
- Salvadori, Massimo (1958). Liberal democracy: an essay on liberty. London: Pall Mall.
