= Ottoman architecture in the 19th–20th centuries =

Late Ottoman period architecture

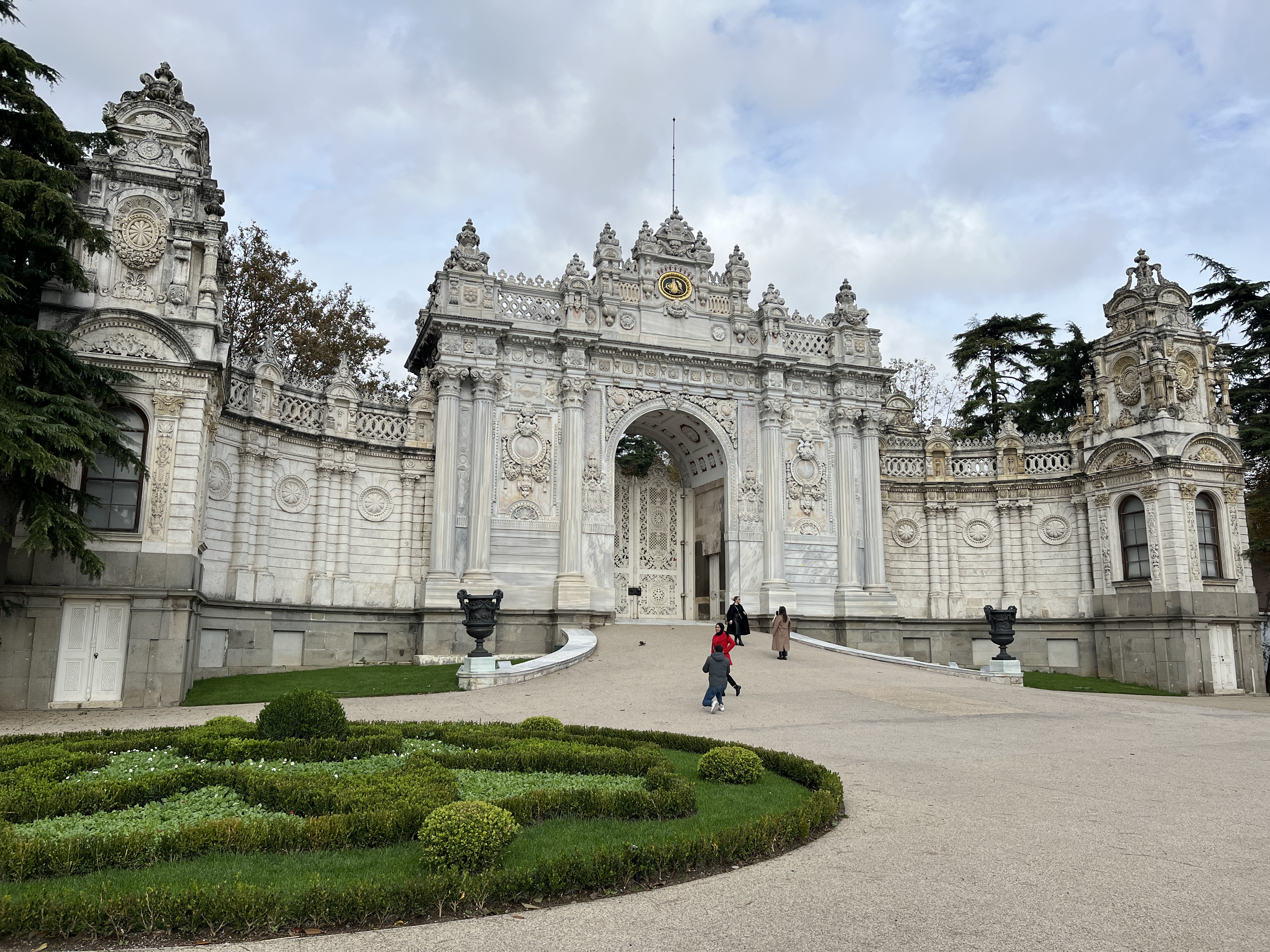
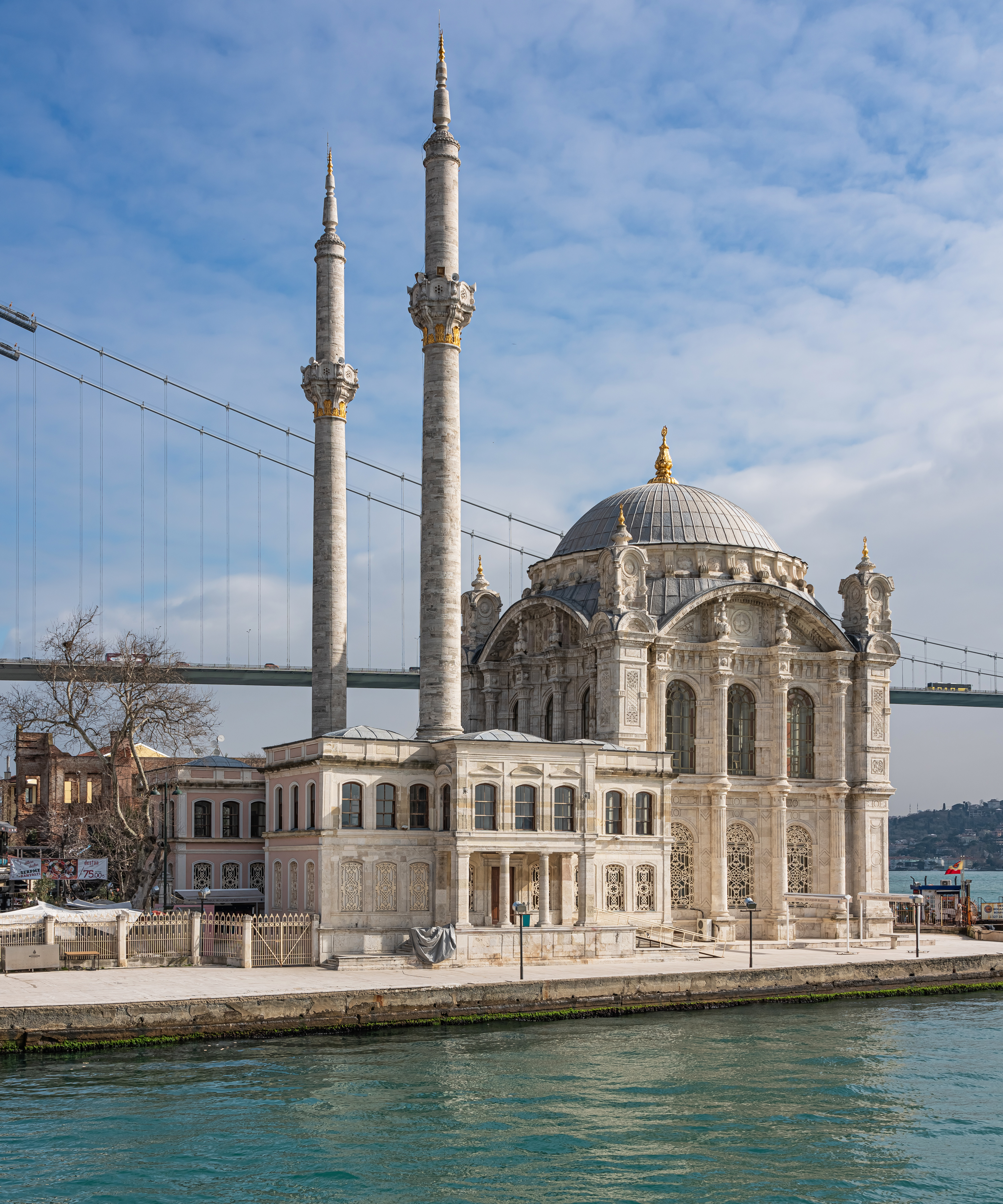
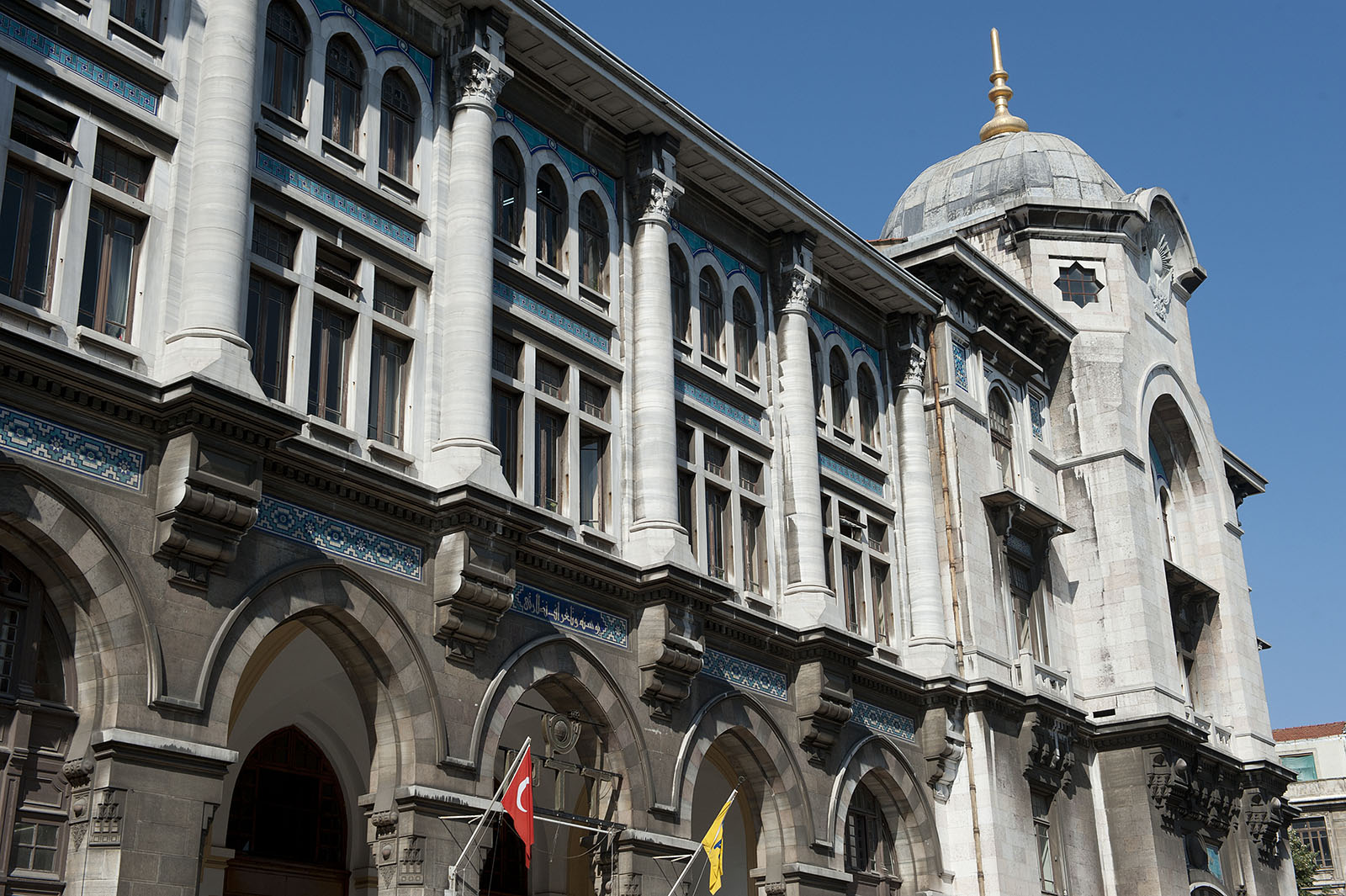
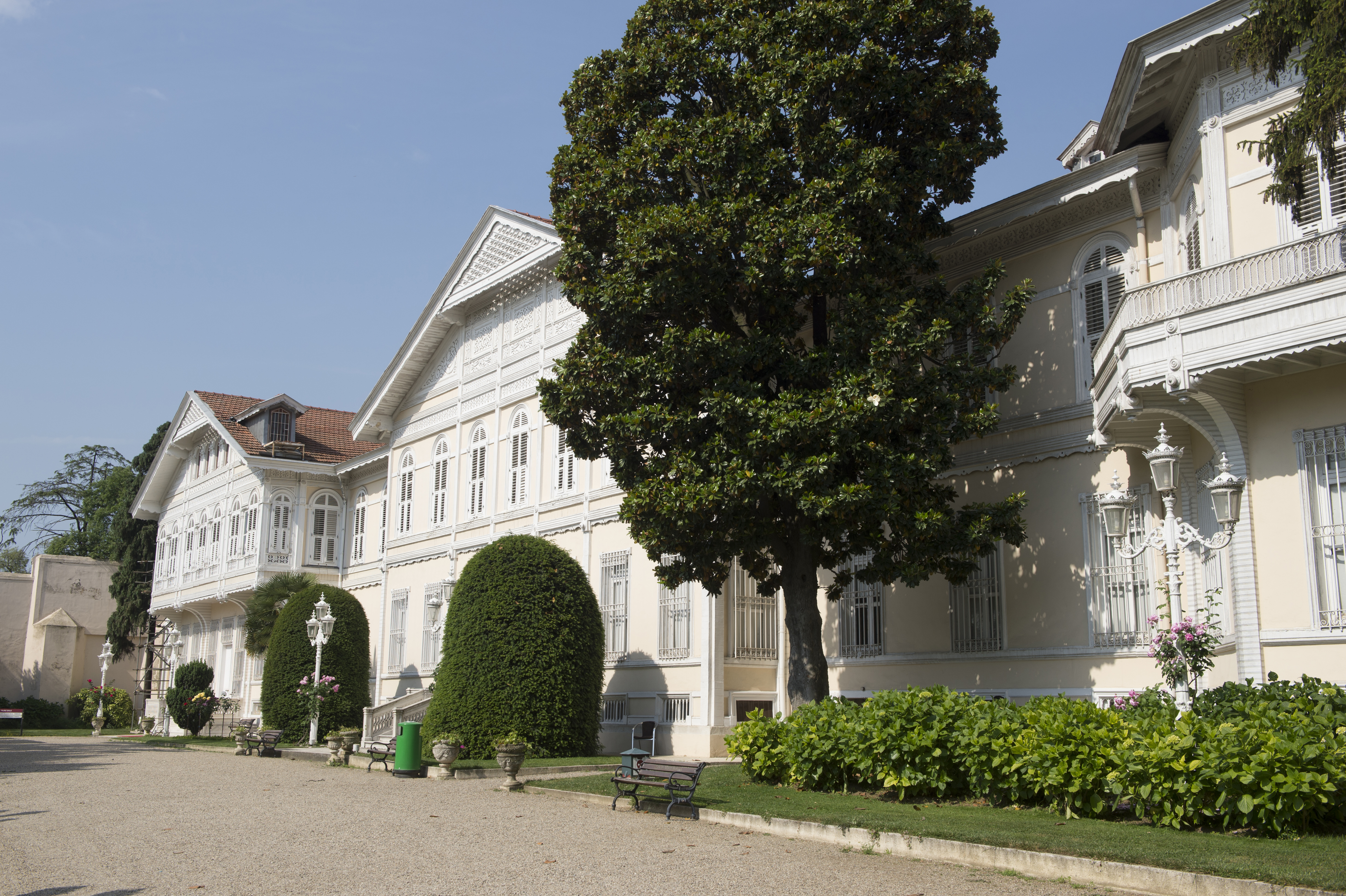
Clockwise from top left: Dolmabahçe Palace (1843–1856), Ortaköy Mosque (1854–1856), Yıldız Palace (after 1876), Grand Post Office (1909)

This article covers the history of Ottoman architecture from the 19th century up to the end of the Ottoman Empire in the early 20th century. The 19th century saw an increase of architectural influences from Western Europe in Ottoman culture. The Ottoman Baroque style, which emerged in the 18th century, continued to be evident in the early 19th century under the reigns of Selim III and Mahmud II. Empire style and Neoclassical motifs also began to be introduced around this time. Subsequently, a trend towards eclecticism became prominent in many types of buildings, particularly during the Tanzimat period (1839 and after), as exemplified by the Dolmabaçe Palace and many mosques of this era designed by architects of the Balyan family.

In the late 19th century, an Orientalist fashion mixed neo-Ottoman and other traditional Islamic architectural elements into new buildings, seen in many of the designs by Alexandre Vallaury. Art Nouveau also appeared towards the end of the century, promoted most notably by Raimondo D'Aronco. The last decades of the Ottoman Empire saw the development of a new architectural style that was more rigorously neo-Ottoman and revivalist, often known as the First National Architectural Movement, by architects such as Mimar Kemaleddin and Vedat Tek.

== Background ==
Following the Ottoman conquest of Constantinople (present-day Istanbul) in 1453, Ottoman architecture evolved progressively into what became the classical Ottoman style, which was consolidated in the 16th century under the long tenure of Mimar Sinan as imperial architect. The classical style remained during the 17th century but became less innovative and more repetitive. Cultural shifts in the early 18th century, particularly during the Tulip Period (c. 1718 – c. 1730), triggered a shift away from this style, as the Ottoman ruling class opened itself to Western influence. New decorative trends and new building types became evident in the architecture of this era.

During the 1740s, a new Ottoman Baroque style emerged in its full expression and rapidly grew dominant in imperial architecture. This signaled the final end to the classical style. After the Tulip Period, Ottoman architecture began to openly imitate European architecture, so that architectural and decorative trends in Europe were mirrored in the Ottoman Empire. Changes were especially evident in the ornamentation of new buildings rather than in their overall forms, though new building types were eventually introduced from European influences as well.

== Last Ottoman Baroque monuments (early 19th century) ==
Some of the last clearly Ottoman Baroque monuments to be constructed were those built under Selim III (r. 1789–1807) and Mahmud II (r. 1808–1839). At the end of the 18th century, one of Selim III's major projects was rebuilding the Eyüp Sultan Mosque between 1798 and 1800. Other family members and high state officials built new monuments in the same area around this time, such as Mihrişah Sultan's charitable complex (1792–1796) and the Tomb of Şah Sultan (1800–1801).

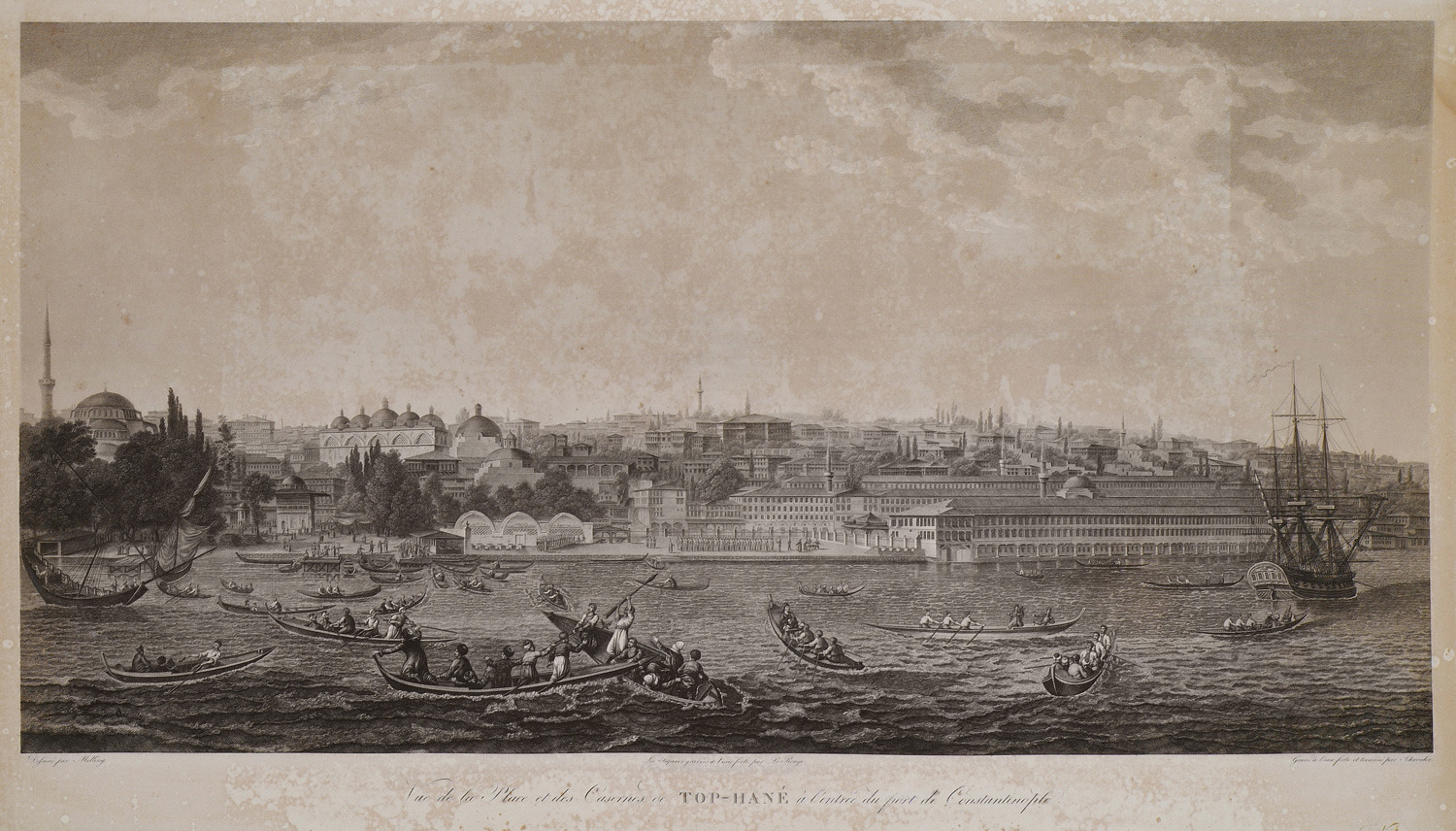
Barracks of Selim III (right) in Tophane, Istanbul, seen in a 1819 engraving by Melling

In other trends, Selim III established the monumental barracks as a new and prominent type of building in Istanbul's urban landscape. This took place in conjunction with Selim III's reform attempts, the Nizam-i Cedid ("New Order"), which among other things created a new Western-style army. Selim III built a barracks building for his "New Artillery" regiment in Tophane, near the later site of the Nusretiye Mosque. This was destroyed by fire in 1823 and rebuilt by Mahmud II in 1824. The Selimiye Barracks was built in southern Üsküdar between 1800 and 1803. It was rebuilt in stone by Mahmud II between 1825 and 1828 and further expanded to its current form by Abdulmecid between 1842 and 1853.

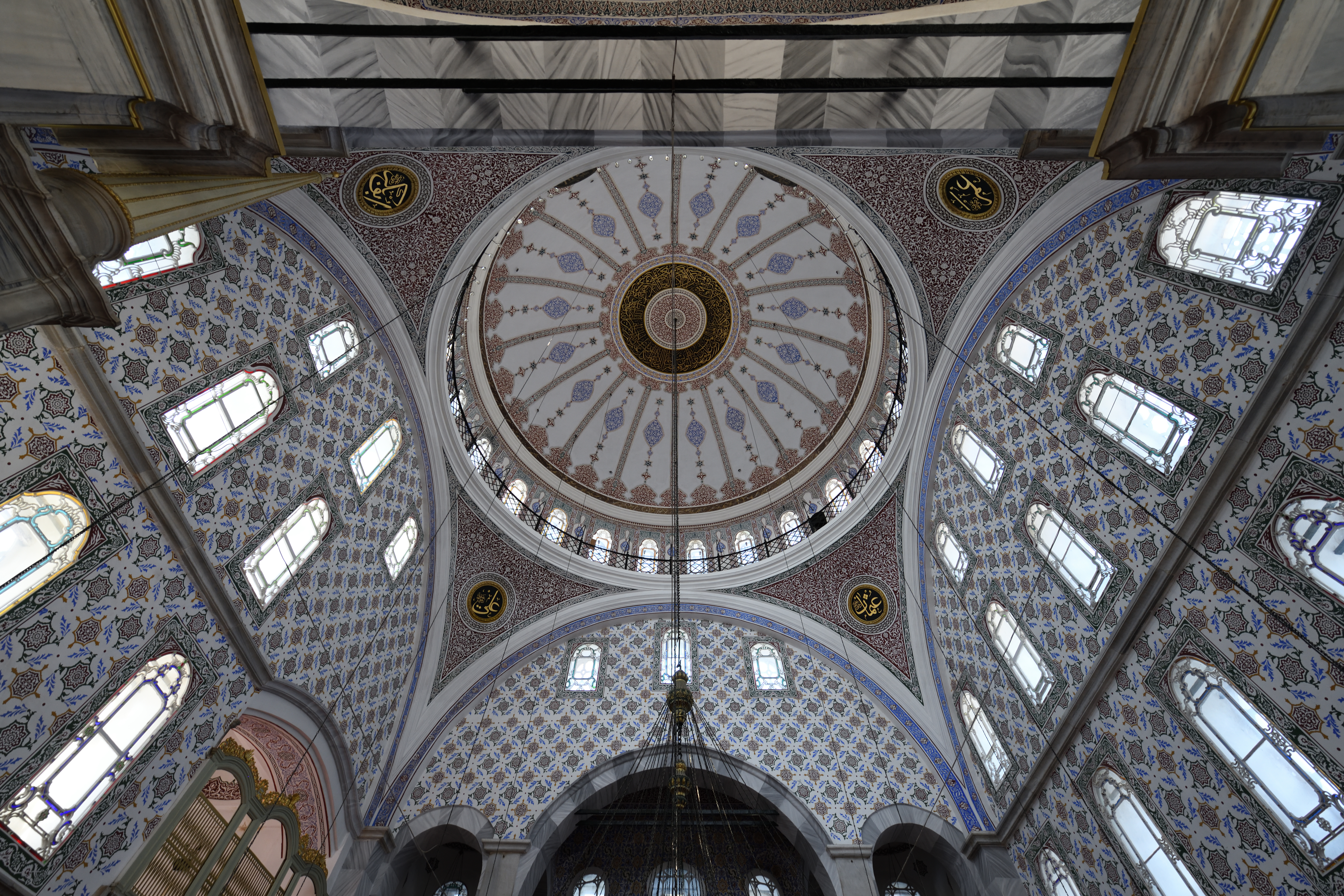
Domed interior of the Selimiye Mosque in Üsküdar, Istanbul (1801–1805)

The construction of the Selimiye Barracks was followed by the construction of the nearby Selimiye Mosque complex between 1801 and 1805. The complex included the usual mosque dependencies, but more innovative was the construction of factories, shops, and modern facilities such as a printing house, all arranged to form the nucleus of a new neighbourhood with a regular grid of streets. The mosque incorporates a wide imperial pavilion (a small lounge or residence for the sultan) that stretches across its front façade, a feature that appeared in the 18th century (e.g. Beylerbeyi Mosque) but which was further refined here. The prayer hall largely retains a traditional single-domed layout.

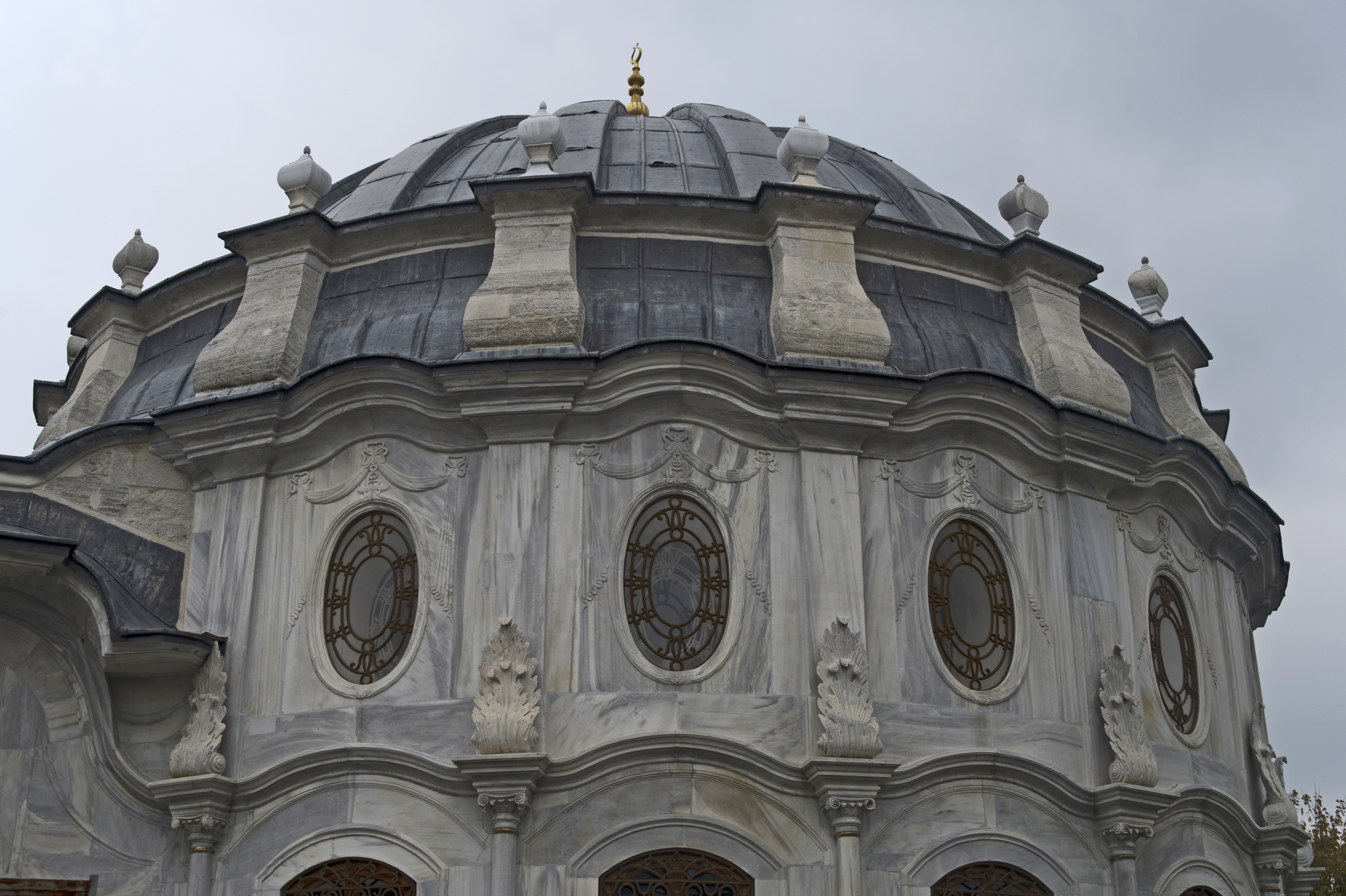
Tomb of Nakşidil Sultan in Istanbul (1818)

From Mahmud II's time, the Tomb of Nakşidil Sultan (1818) is one of the finest Ottoman Baroque tombs and one of the best examples of late Baroque monuments. It also incorporates some influence from the Empire style, which was being introduced in Istanbul around this time. Some of the Baroque mosques from this period feature elliptical domes, such as the small single-domed Küçük Efendi (or Fevziye) Mosque in Istanbul (1825) and the multi-domed Kapı Mosque in Konya (1812).

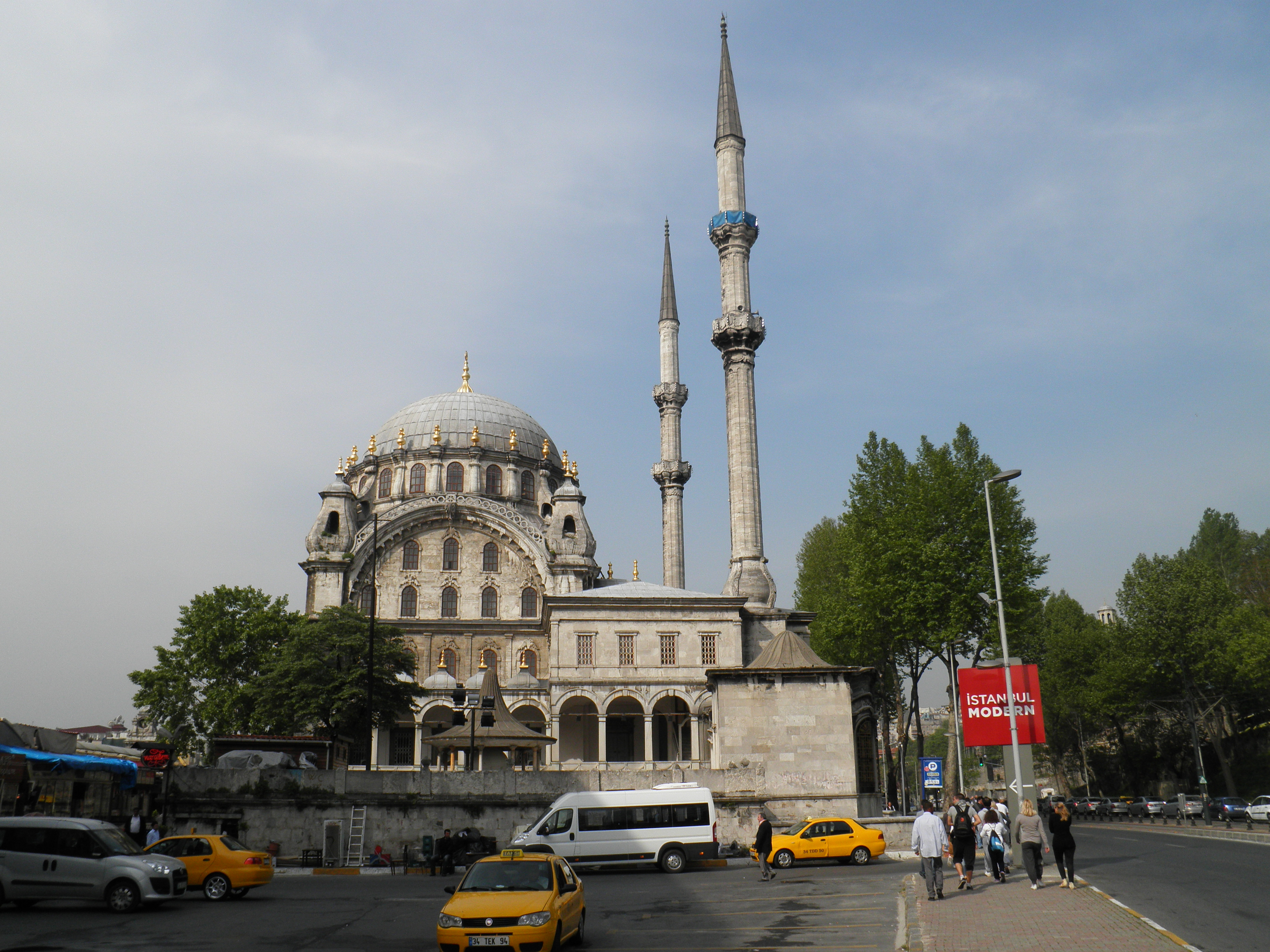
Nusretiye Mosque in Tophane, Istanbul (1822–1824)

The Nusretiye Mosque, Mahmud II's imperial mosque, was built between 1822 and 1826 at Tophane. This mosque was the first major imperial work by Krikor Balian. It is sometimes described as belonging to the Empire style, but is considered by art historians Godfrey Goodwin and Doğan Kuban as one of the last Ottoman Baroque mosques. Another art historian, Ünver Rüstem, describes the style as moving away from the Baroque and towards an Ottoman interpretation of Neoclassicism. Goodwin also describes it as the last in a line of imperial mosques that started with the Nuruosmaniye (1748–1755). Despite its relatively small size the mosque's tall proportions creates a sense of height, marking the culmination of a trend that likely began with the Ayazma Mosque (1757–1761).

== Empire style (early–mid 19th century) ==
During the reign of Mahmud II (r. 1808–1839) the Empire style, a Neoclassical style which originated in France under Napoleon, was also introduced into Ottoman architecture. This marked the trend towards increasingly direct imitation of Western styles, particularly from France. The purest example of the Empire style in Istanbul is the Tomb of Mahmud II (1840), an imposing octagonal monument designed by Ohannes and Bogos Dadyan. Other examples are the Cevri Kalfa School on Divanyolu Street, dated to 1819, and the tomb and library complex of Hüsrev Pasha in the Eyüp neighbourhood, dated to 1839. The upper section of the Tower of Justice or Divan Tower in Topkapı Palace was also rebuilt in its current form under Mahmud II in 1820, adopting Renaissance and Palladian elements. Empire style motifs, such as colonettes and composite capitals, continued to be widely used throughout the 19th century alongside other styles.

The Hırka-i Şerif Mosque, built between 1847 and 1851 under Abdülmecid I (r. 1839–1861), is a unique religious building in Ottoman architecture which was designed to house the Holy Mantle (Hırka-i Şerif), a relic of Muhammad. (Another mantle and relic, the Hırka-i Saadet, is housed in Topkapı Palace.) Because of this special function, the mosque has an unusual design. It was built and decorated in a purely Empire or Neoclassical style. It is fronted by an imperial pavilion with a somber Neoclassical façade and slender minarets that look like Corinthian columns. This section leads to an octagonal mosque lit by large windows, with a mihrab and minbar fashioned of dark grey marble. The sacred relic is kept inside another smaller octagonal building directly behind the mosque.

Empire style

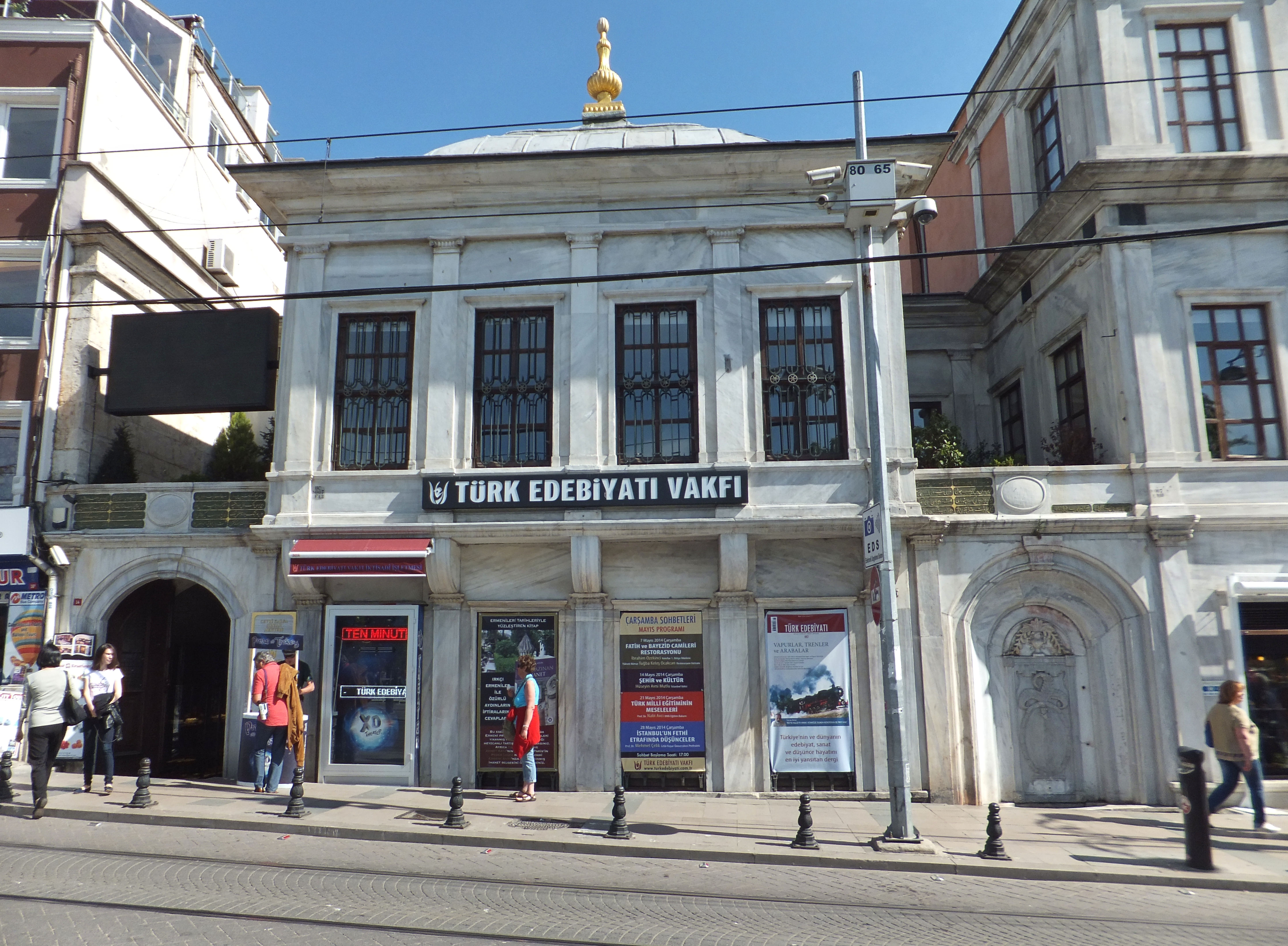
Cevri Kalfa School in Istanbul (1819)

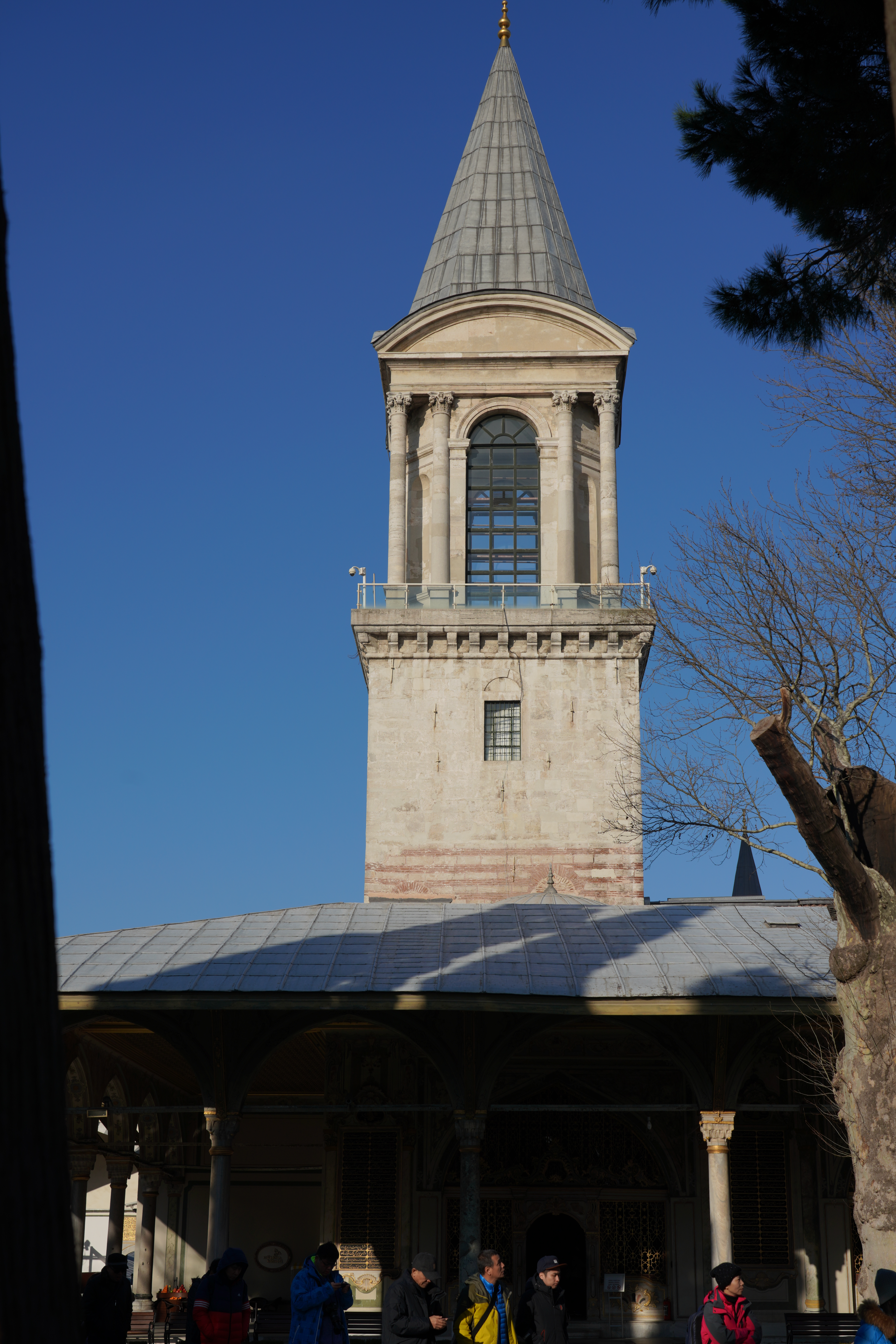
Tower of Justice in Topkapı Palace (1820)

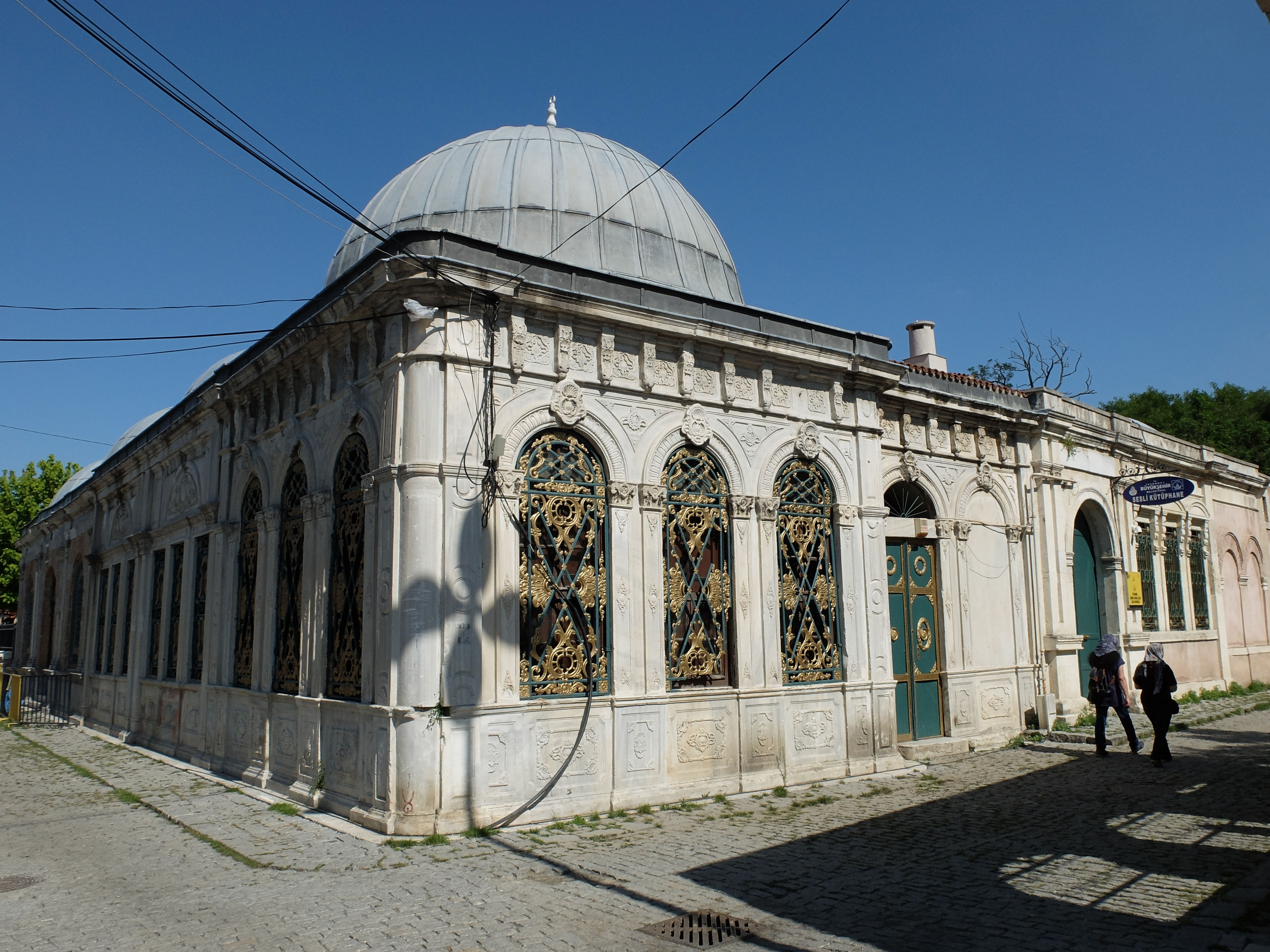
Tomb of Hüsrev Pasha in Eyüp, Istanbul (1839)

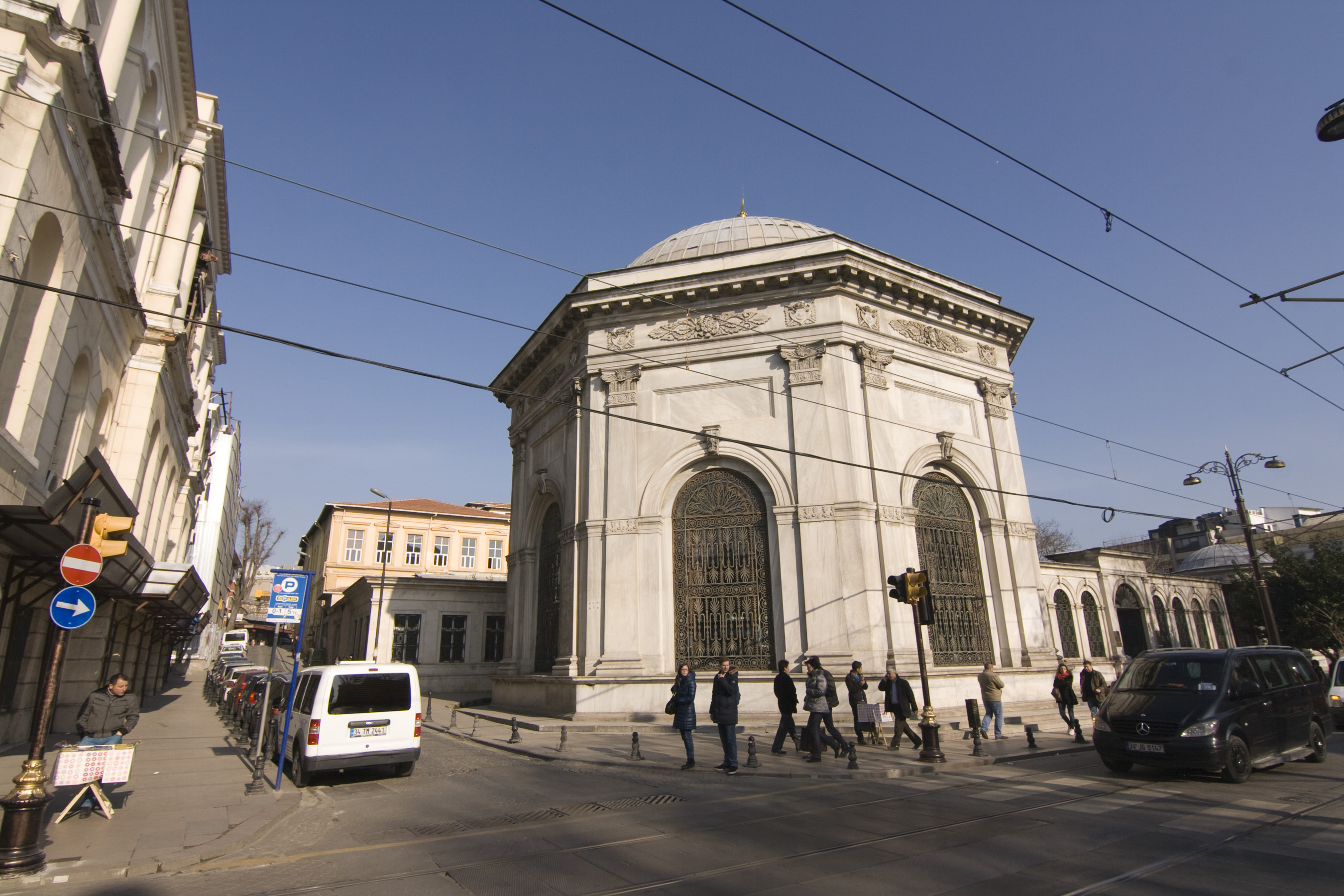
Tomb of Mahmud II in Istanbul (1840)

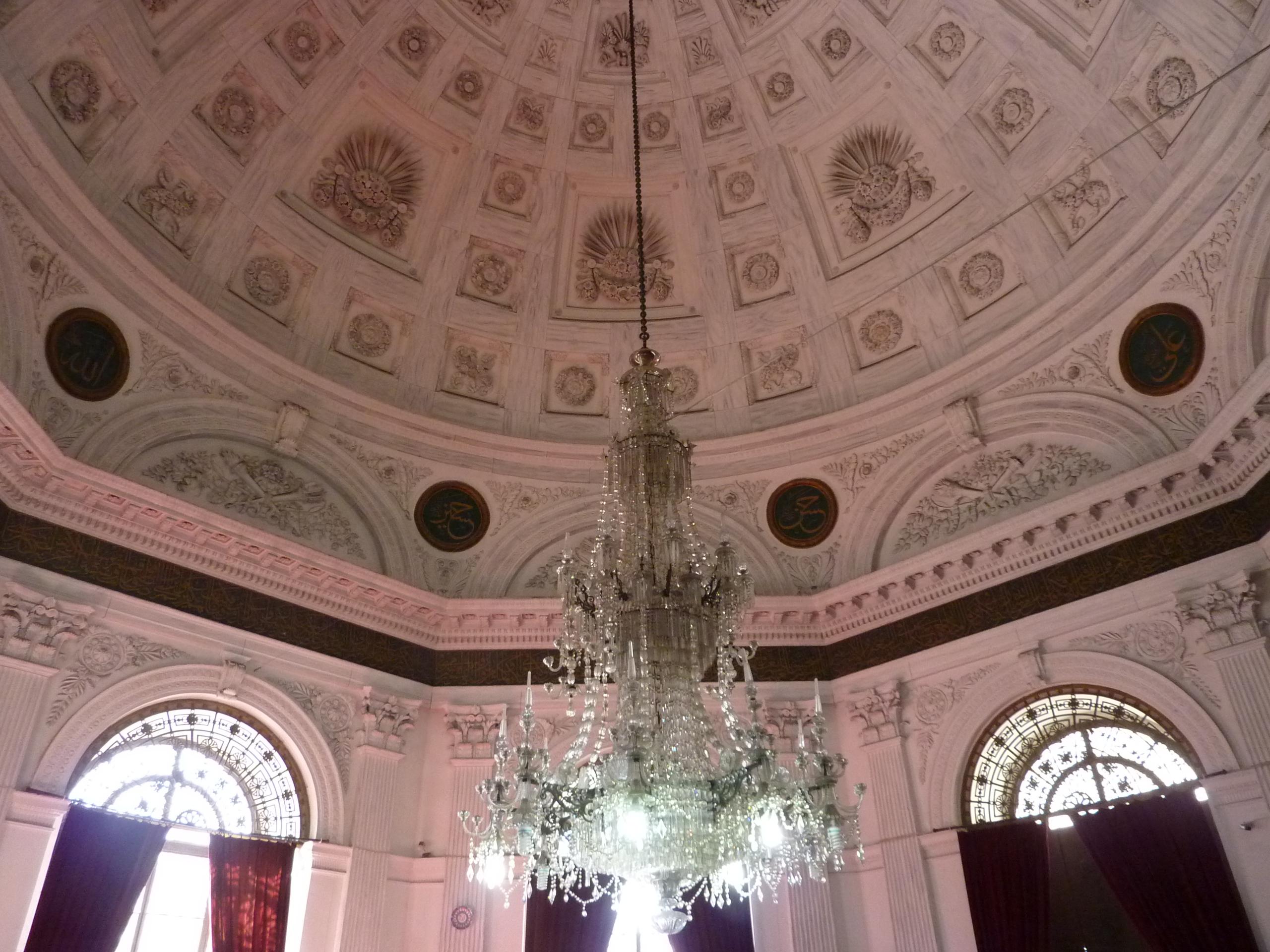
Interior of the Tomb of Mahmud II

== Eclecticism (19th century) ==
The Tanzimat reforms began in 1839 under Abdülmecid I (r. 1839–1861) and sought to modernize the Ottoman Empire with Western-style reforms. In the architectural realm, this period resulted in the dominance of European architects and of Ottoman architects with European training. Among these, the Balyans, an Ottoman Armenian family, succeeded in dominating imperial architecture for much of the century. They were joined by European architects such as the Fossati brothers, William James Smith, and Alexandre Vallaury. After the early 19th century, Ottoman architecture was characterized by an eclectic architecture that mixed or borrowed from multiple styles. The Balyans, for example, commonly combined Neoclassical or Beaux-arts architecture with highly eclectic decoration. As more Europeans arrived in Istanbul, the neighbourhoods of Galata and Beyoğlu (or Pera) took on very European appearances.

=== Palaces ===
==== Dolmabahçe Palace ====
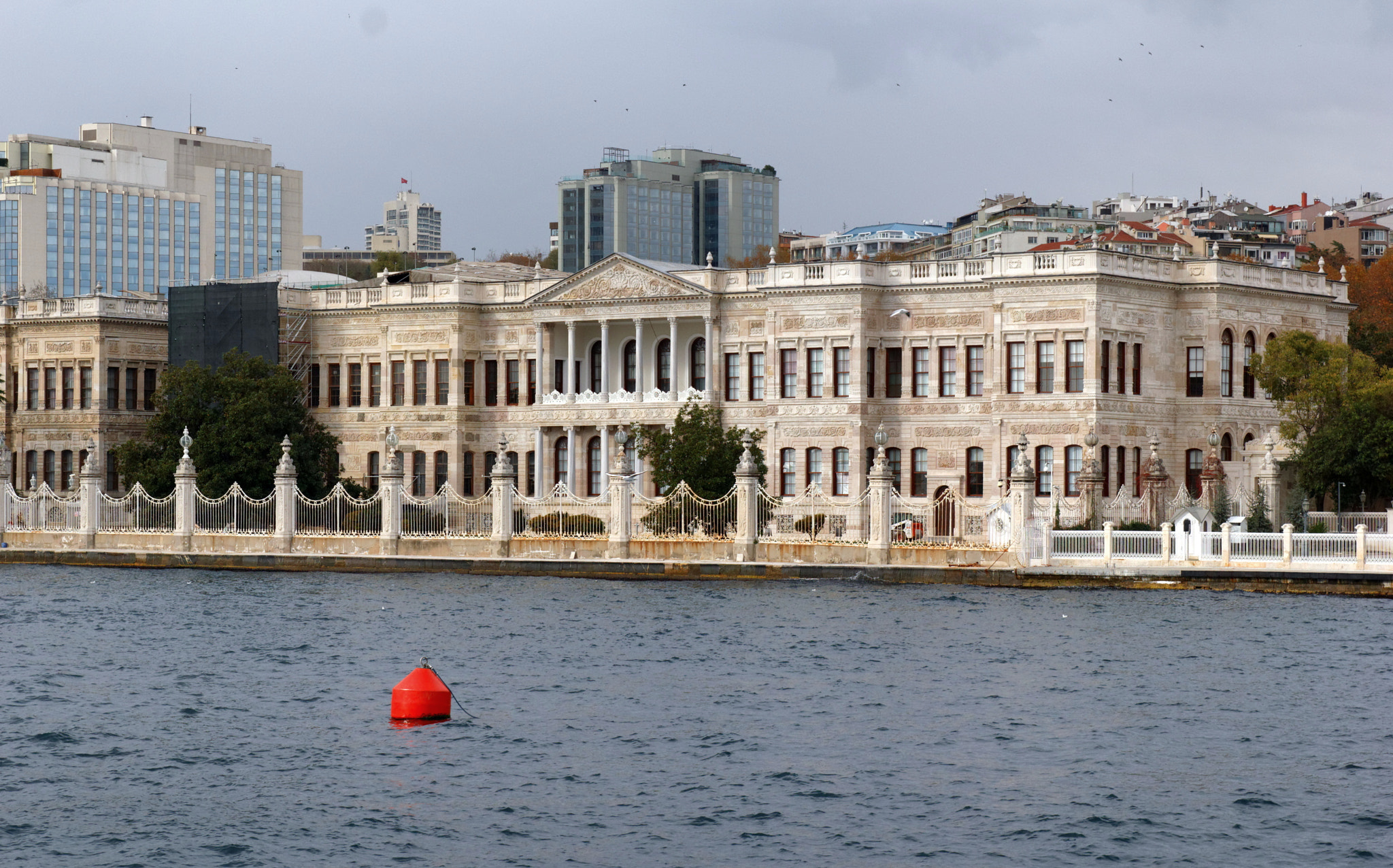
View of the Dolmabahçe Palace from the Bosphorus

The Dolmabahçe Palace was constructed for Sultan Abdülmecid between June 13, 1843, and June 7, 1856. Construction was finished by 1853 or 1854, but the sultan did not move into the palace until 1856. It replaced the Topkapı Palace as the official imperial residence of the sultan. It was built on a site along the Bosphorus that had been previously occupied by the old Beşiktaş Palace and its gardens, which had been used and expanded by various sultans since the 17th century until its demolition to make room for the current palace. Dolmabahçe Palace was designed by Garabet Balyan, though his son Nikogos was known to collaborate with him and may have designed the Ceremonial Hall and the palace gates. The palace consists mainly of a single building with monumental proportions. These characteristics represented a radical rejection of traditional Ottoman palace design.

The style of the palace is fundamentally Neoclassical but is characterized by a highly eclectic decoration that mixes Baroque motifs with other styles. The monumental gates that lead to the palace grounds are especially ornate and distinguished by highly sculptural and eclectic decoration in stone, marble, and plaster. The decoration of the palace goes beyond the usual eclecticism seen in contemporary Western architecture, as it mixes multiple different styles in the same building. It lacks some consistency and unity as a result. Aside from the European-inspired design, the organization of the palace still reflected a traditional Ottoman division between the selamlık (official section), which occupies the southwestern wing of the palace, and the harem (private section), which occupies the northeastern wing. The two wings of the palace are separated by the Ceremonial Hall, a grand domed hall. The different sections of the palace are also centred around cruciform halls, another feature retained from the Ottoman tradition.

Dolmabahçe Palace (1843–1856)

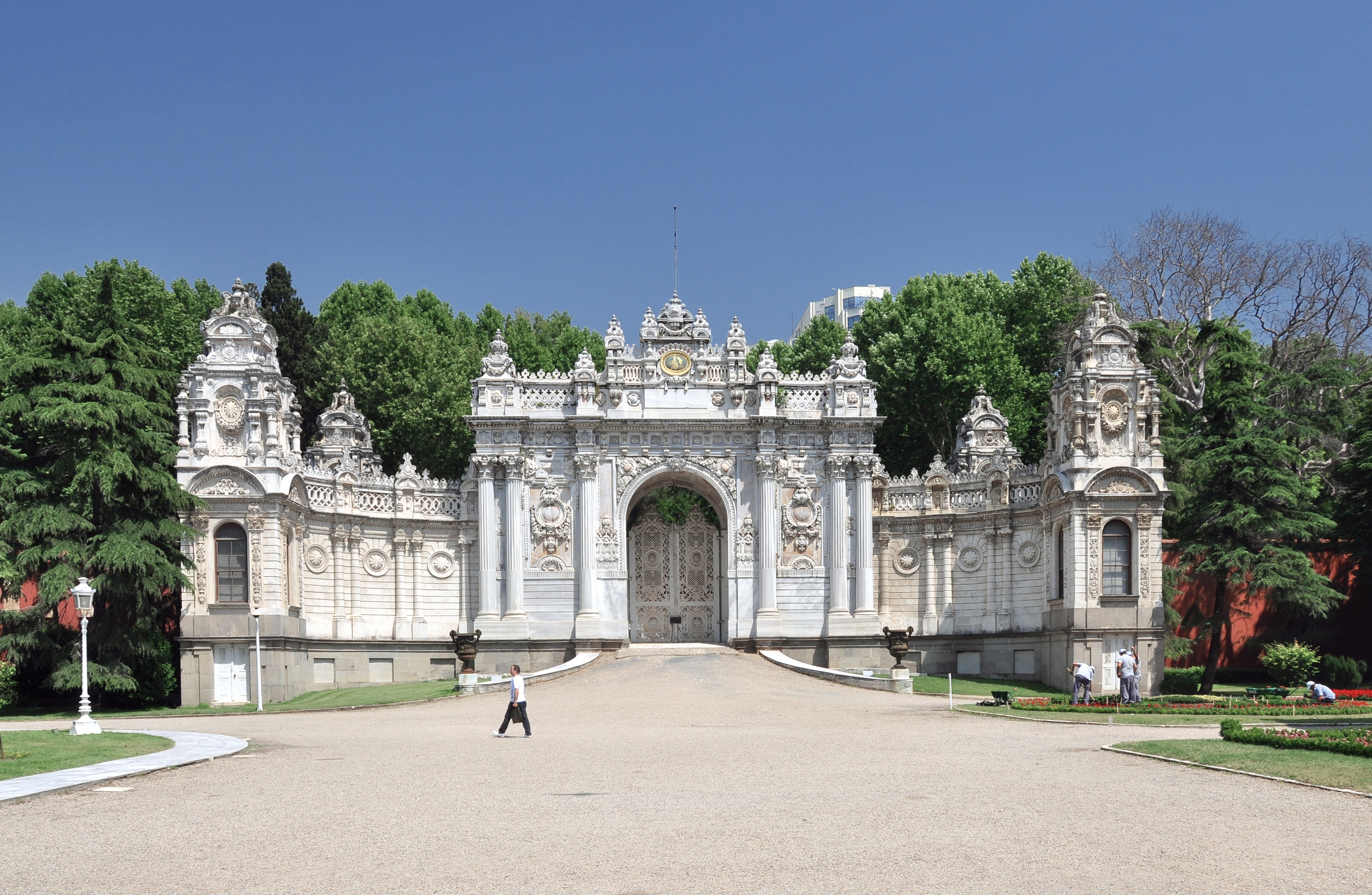
Treasury Gate

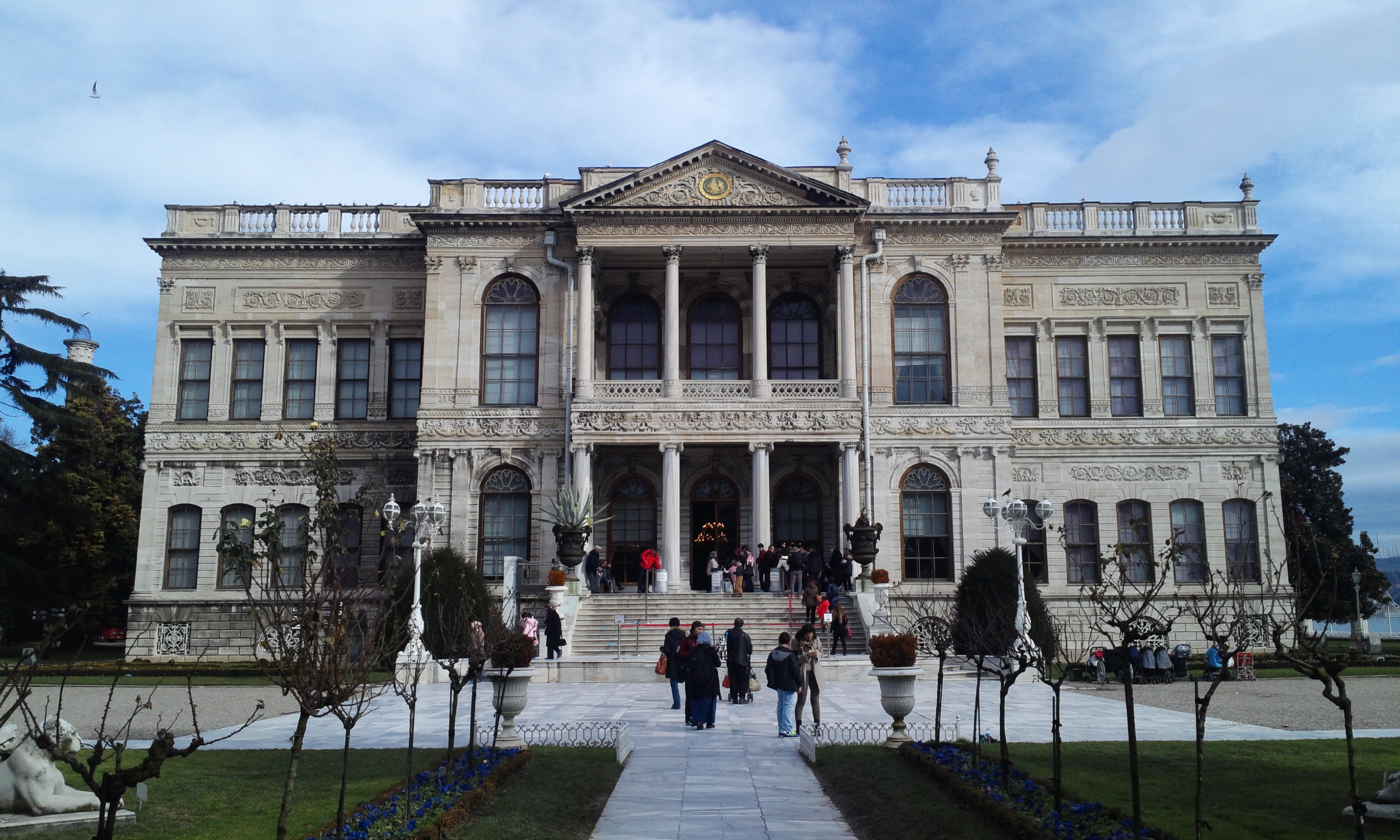
External façade of the selamlık

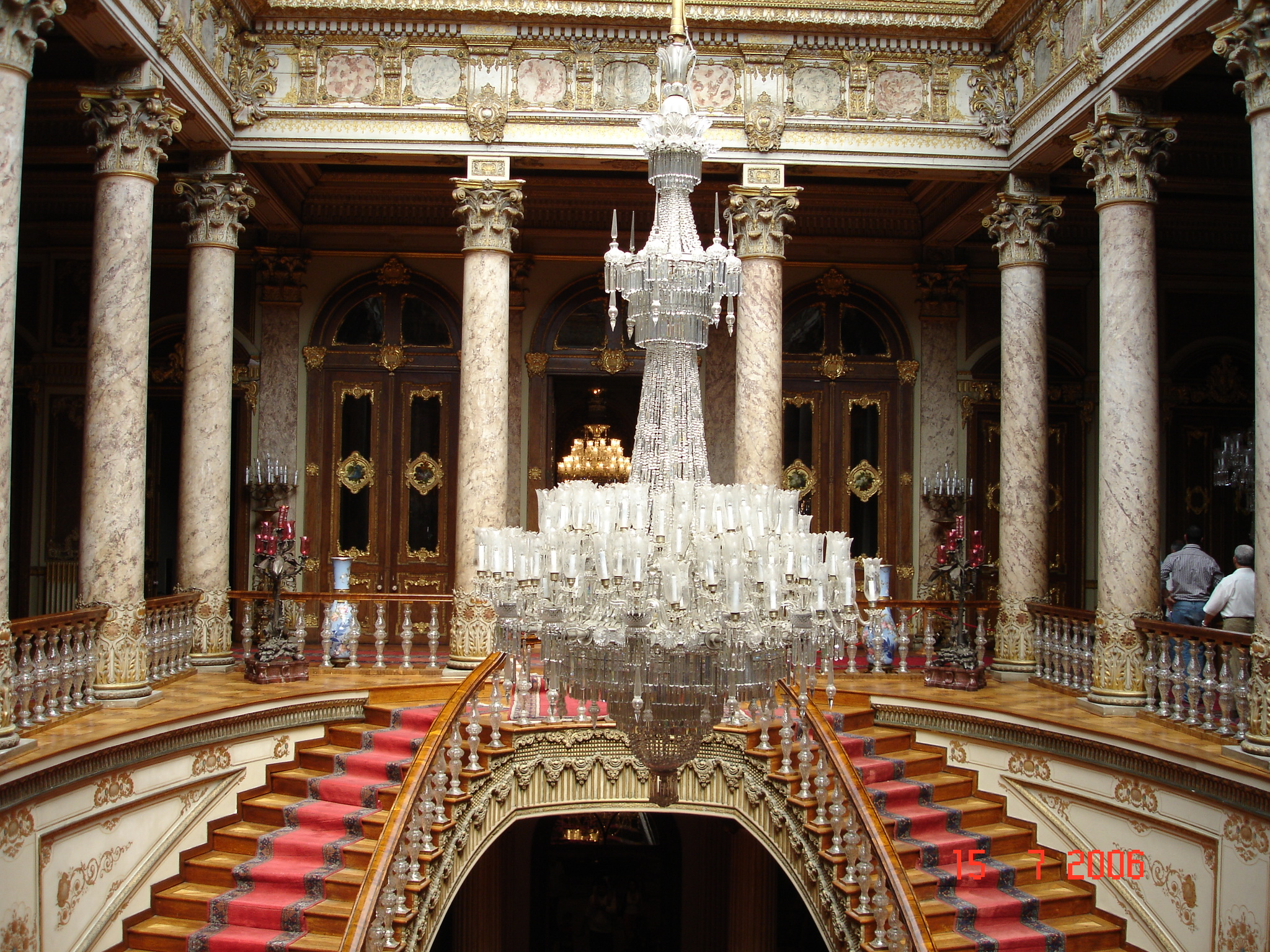
Crystal Staircase in the selamlik section of the palace

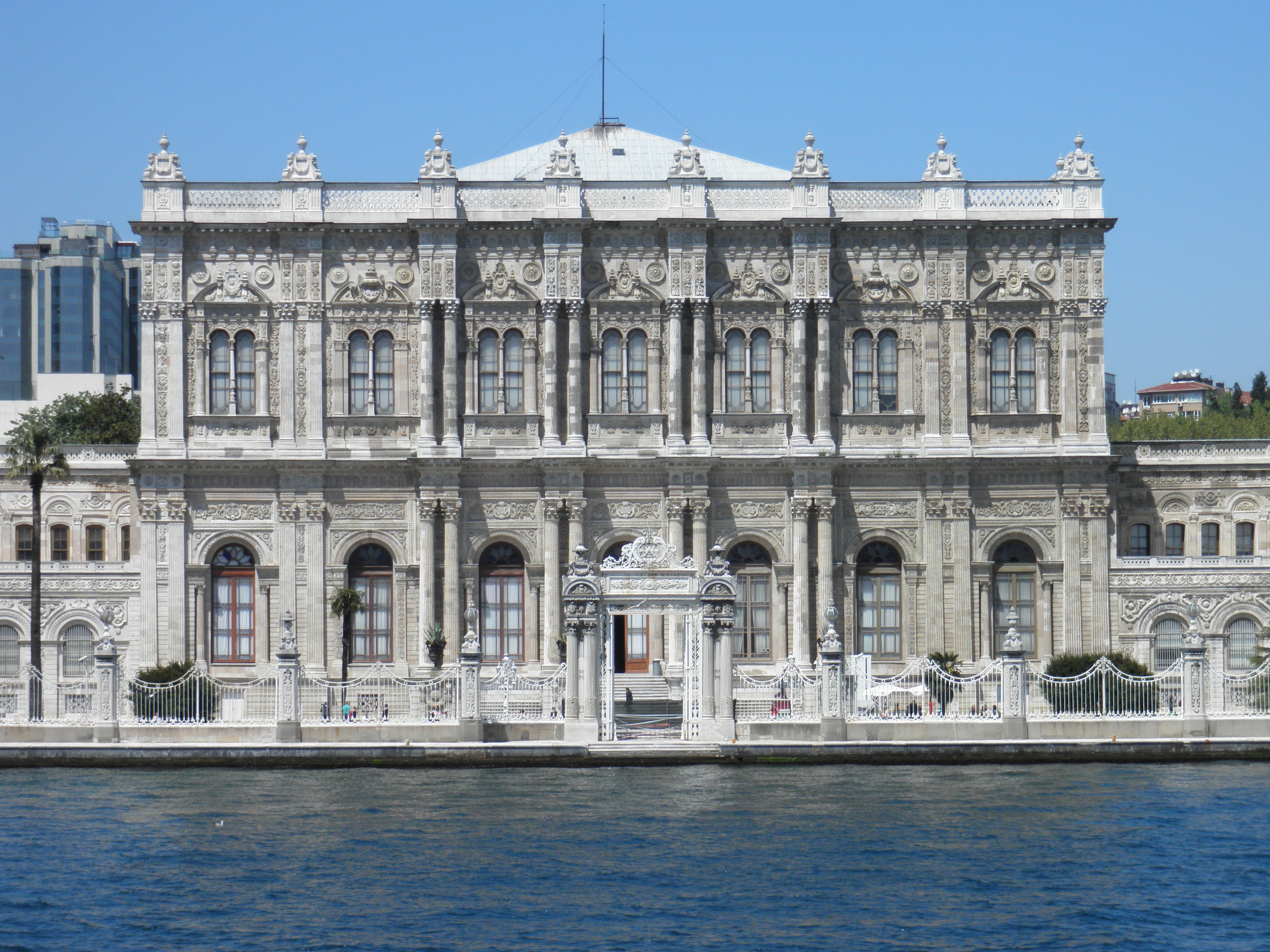
External façade of the Ceremonial Hall

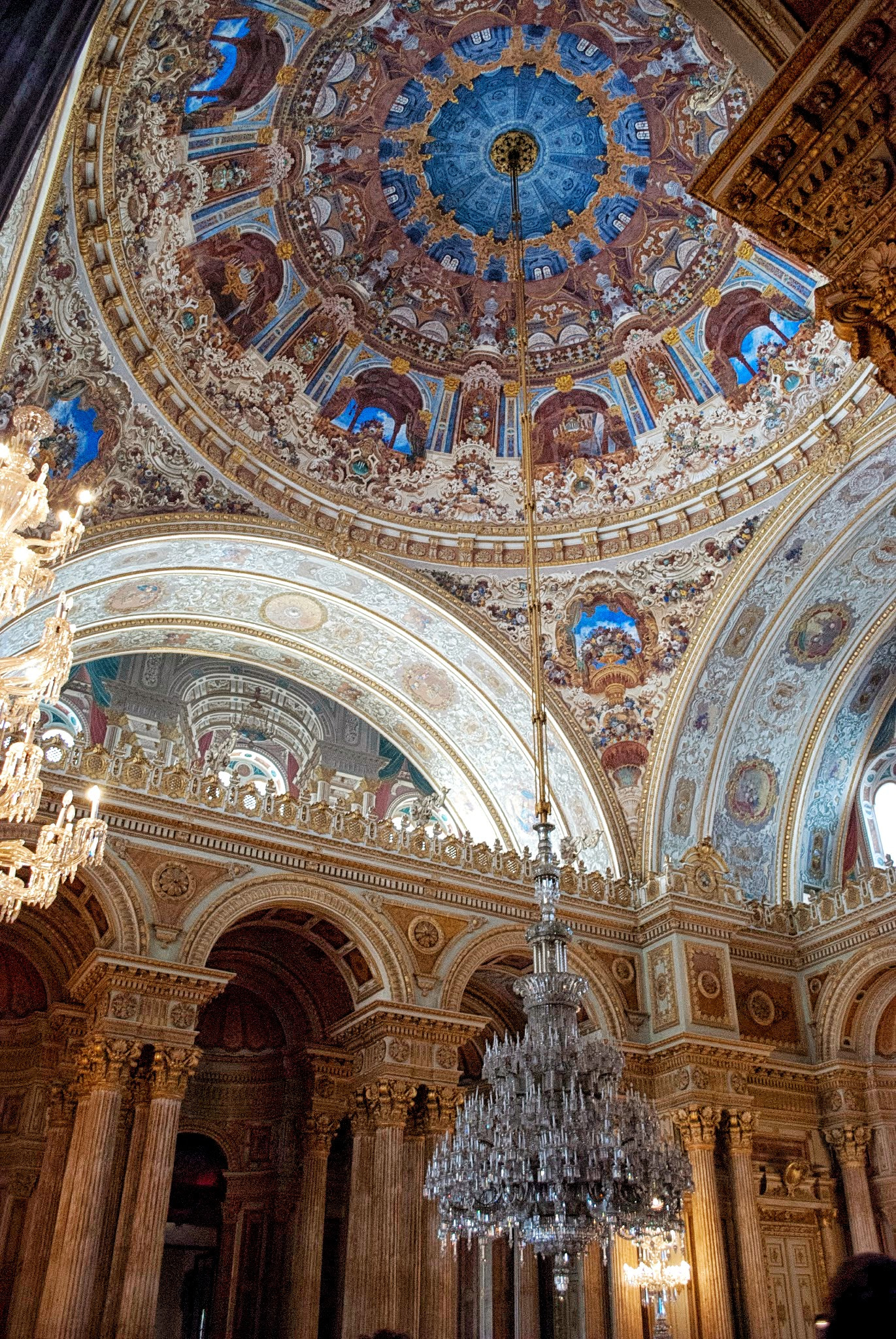
Interior of the Ceremonial Hall

==== Other residences and pavilions ====
Many other palaces, residences, and pleasure pavilions were built in the 19th century, most of them in the Bosphorus suburbs of Istanbul. The small single-story Ihlamur Pavilion, built in 1849–1855, and the slightly larger two-story Küçüksu Pavilion, built in 1856, were both designed by Nikogos Balyan and feature very ornate façades. They were originally used as recreational pavilions or resting areas and did not contain bedrooms, though bedrooms were later added to the Küçüksu Pavilion when it was used to house foreign dignitaries. The Mecidiye Kiosk in the Fourth Court of Topkapı Palace is another small single-story structure in a similar style, designed by Sarkis Balyan and built in 1840.

The Beylerbeyi Palace, along the shore of the Bosphorus, was designed by Sarkis Balyan and his brother Agop Balyan in a Neoclassical style with eclectic and Orientalist interior decoration. It was completed in 1864–1865 and replaced an earlier structure by Krikor Balyan from the reign of Mahmud II. The palace was used as the sultan's summer residence and as a guest residence for foreign dignitaries. Like Dolmabahçe Palace, its interior is divided into selamlık and harem sections separated by a large central hall.

Soon after this, the Çırağan Palace was commissioned by Sultan Abdülalziz (r. 1861–1876) and completed in 1872. Nikogos or Sarkis Balyan was probably responsible for the design. It has a severe Neoclassical appearance except for the decoration, which is Orientalist and includes carved openwork in the windows. The palace was destroyed by fire in 1910, leaving only the seaside façade standing which was later integrated into a hotel in 1987.

Other 19th-century palaces

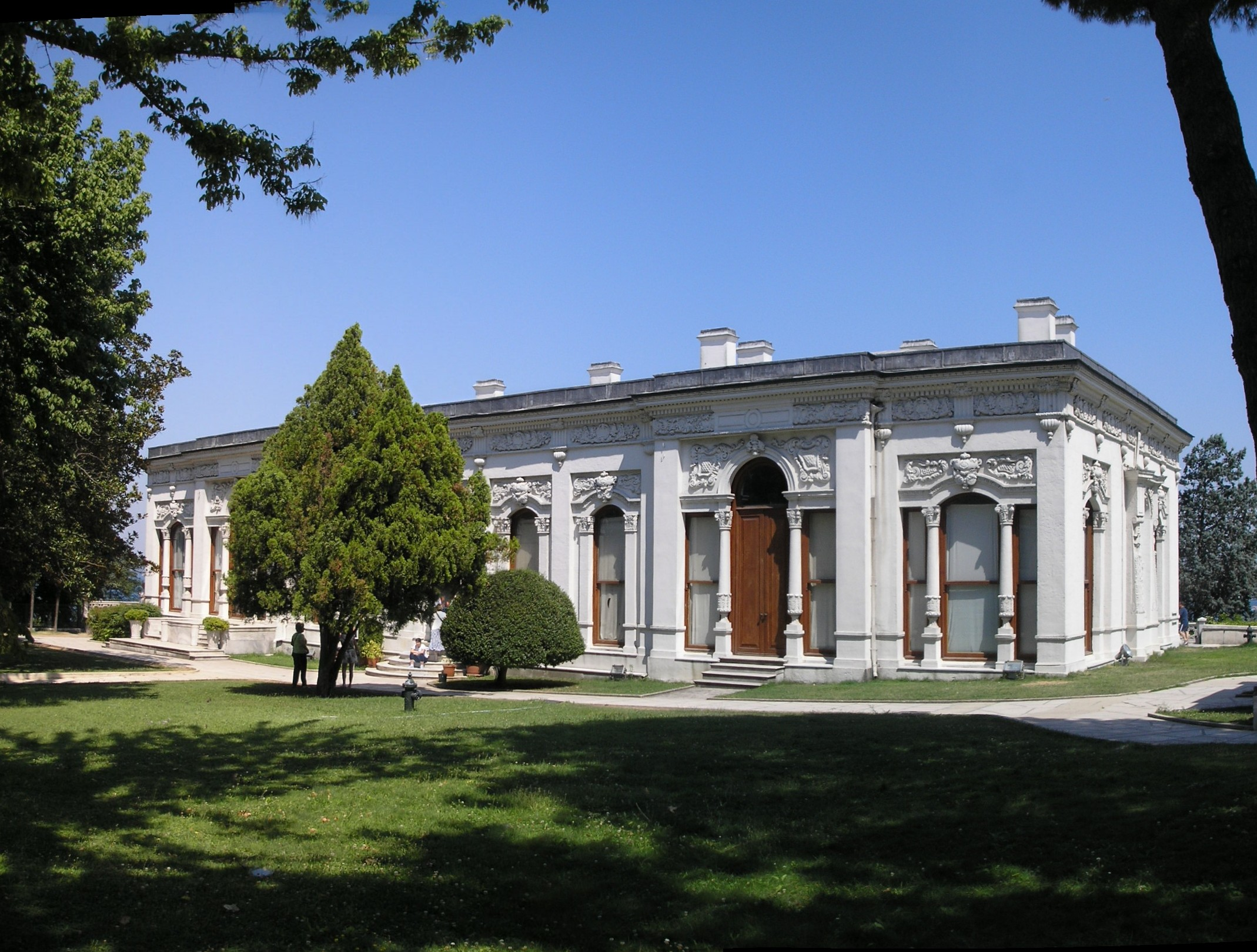
Mecidiye Kiosk in Topkapı Palace (1840)

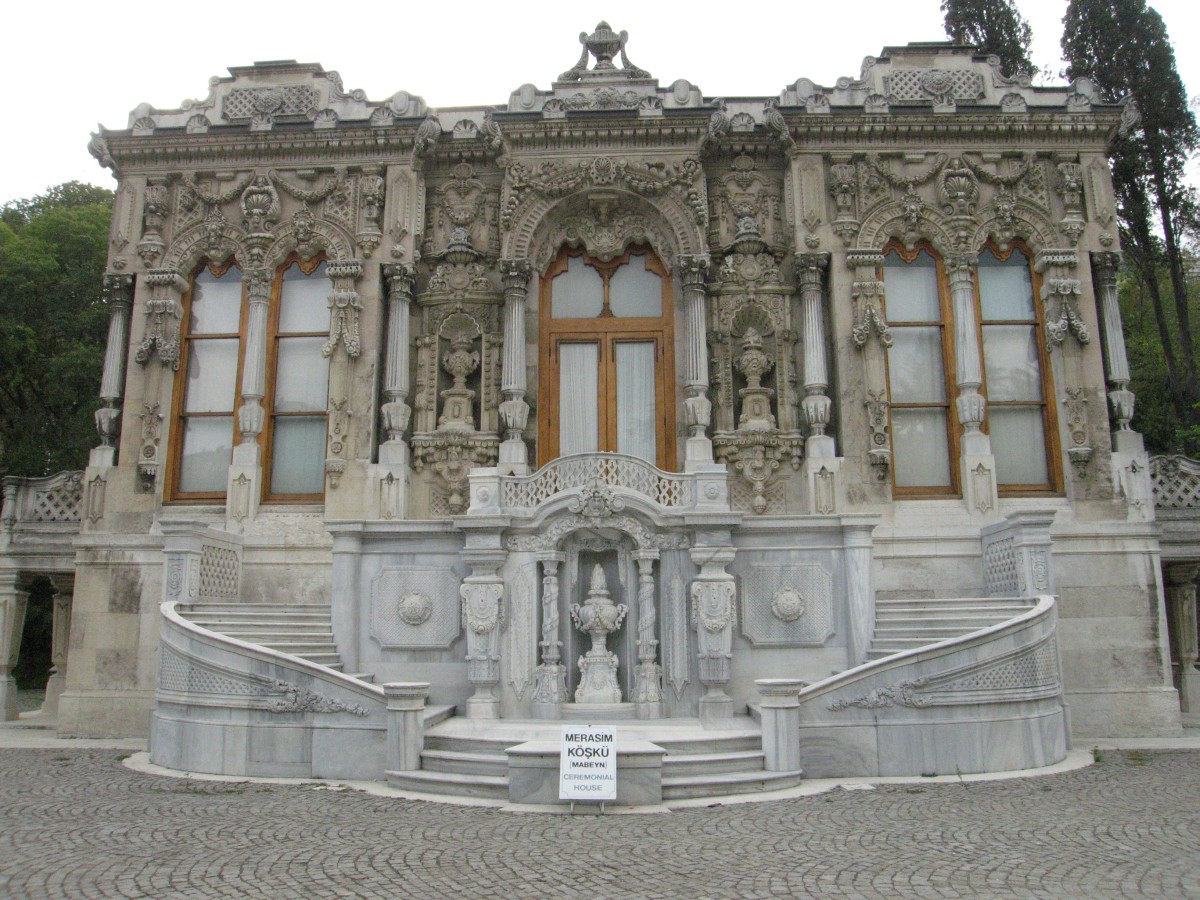
Ihlamur Pavilion, Istanbul (1849–1855)

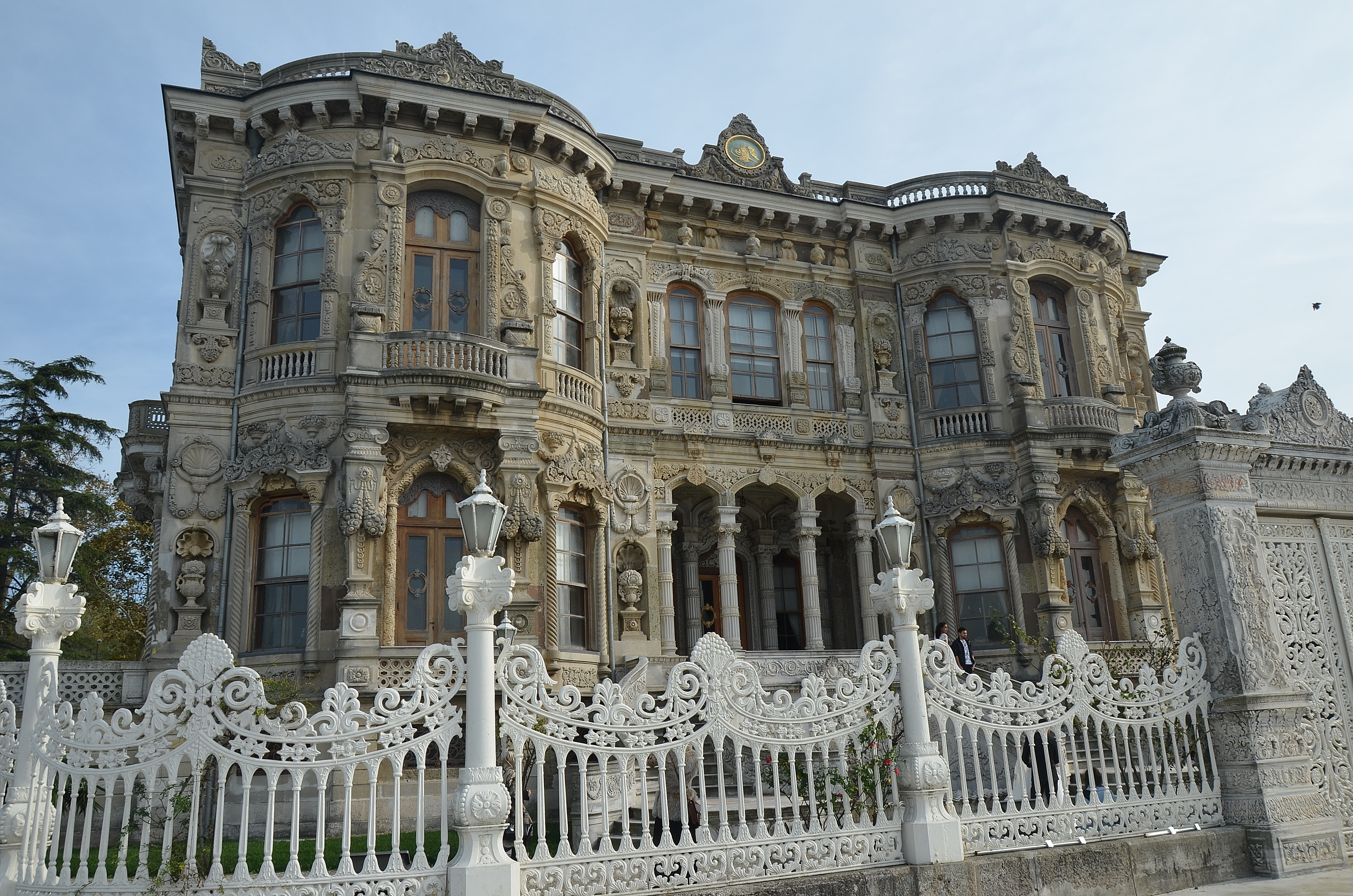
Küçüksu Pavilion, Istanbul (1856)

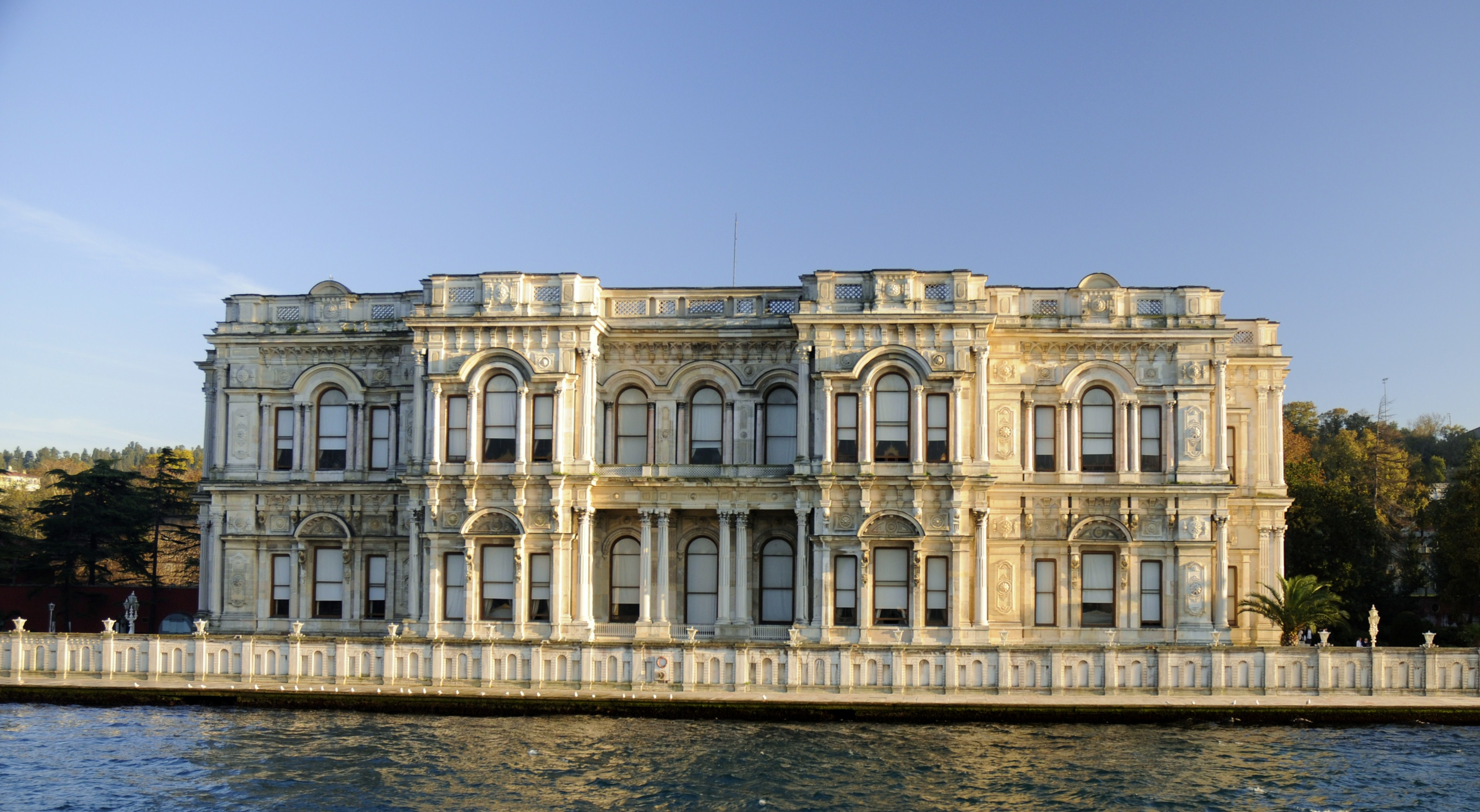
Beylerbeyi Palace, Istanbul (completed 1864–1865)

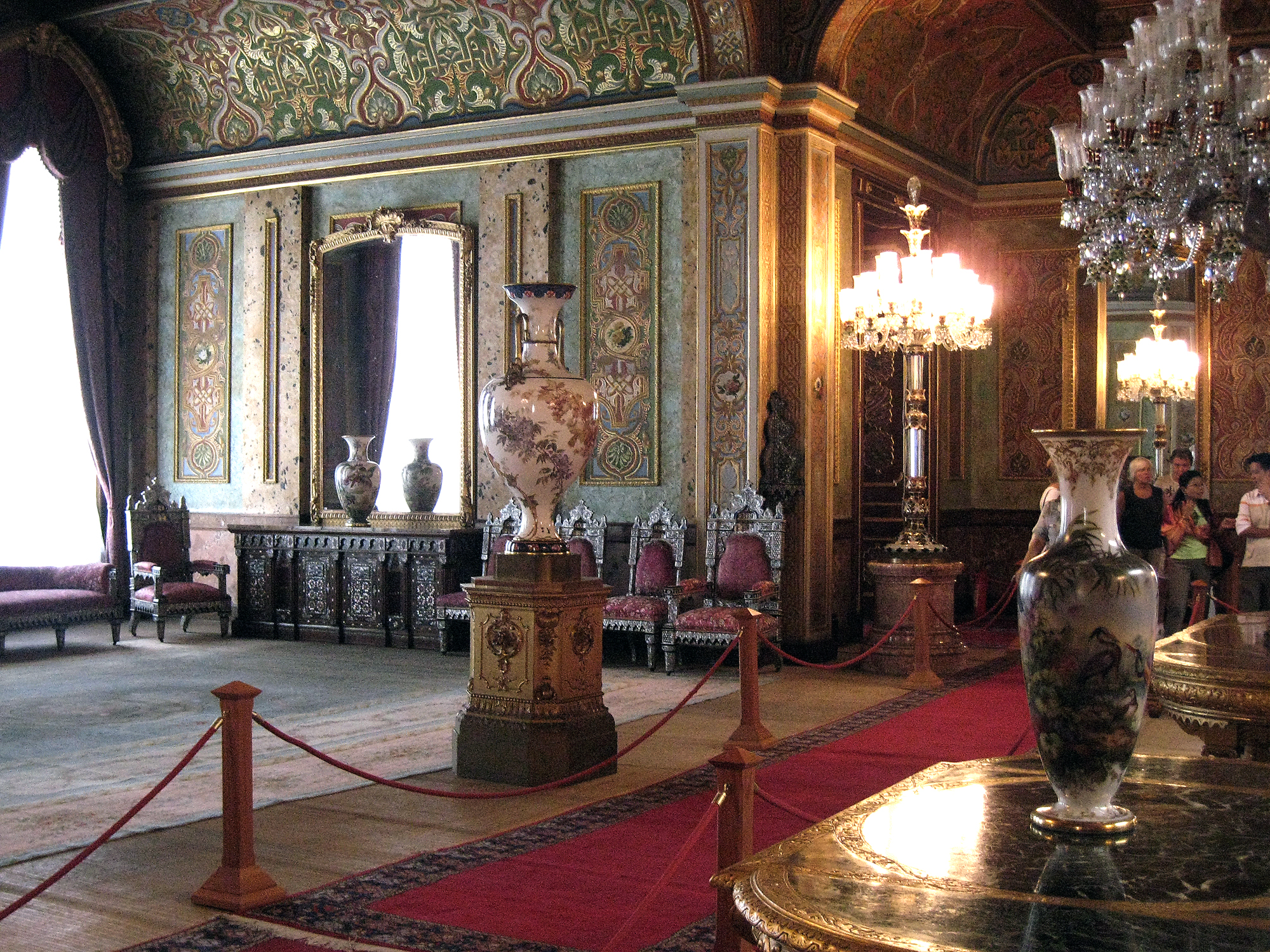
Interior of Beylerbeyi Palace

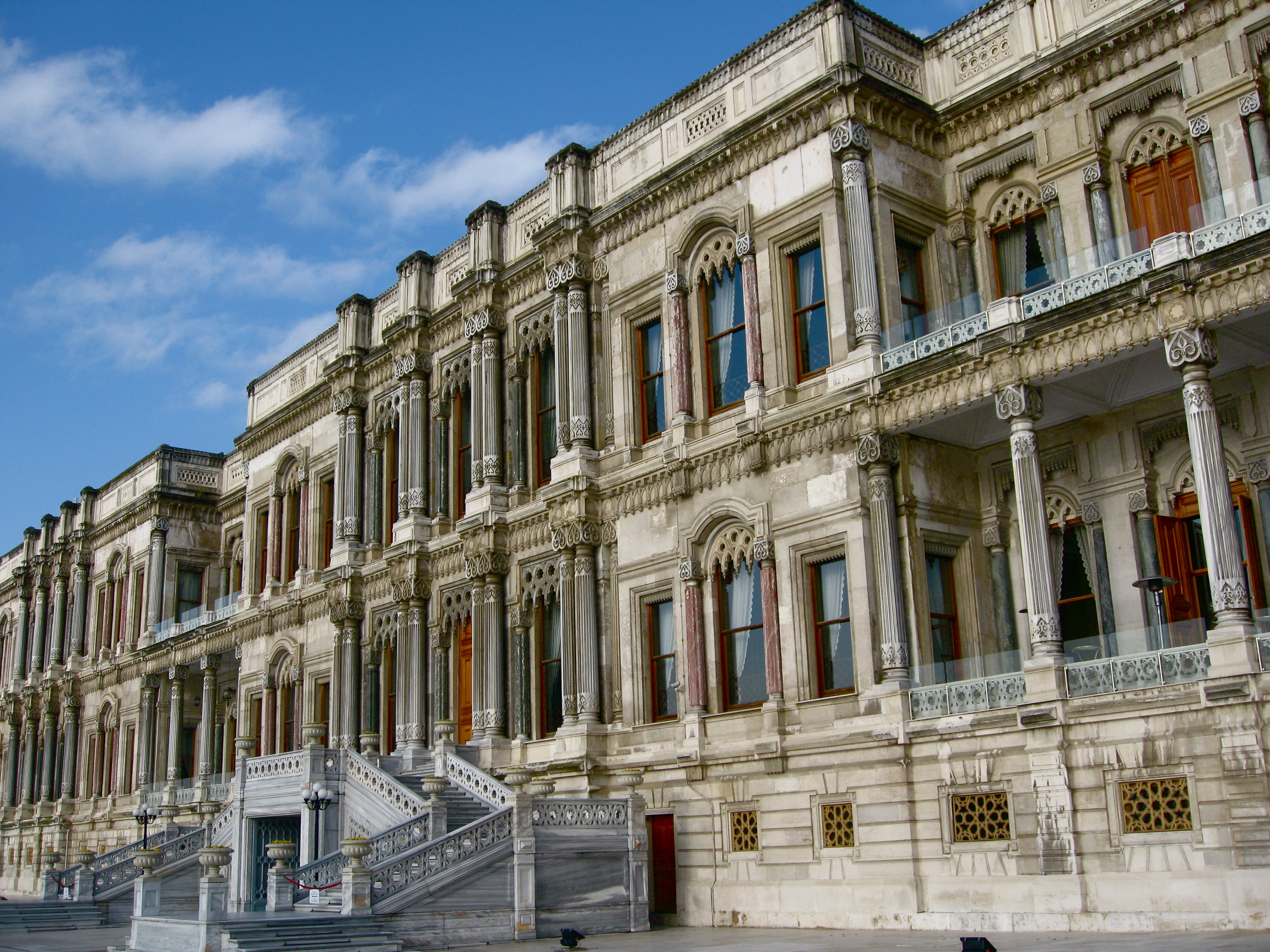
Çırağan Palace, Istanbul (1872)

==== Yıldız Palace ====
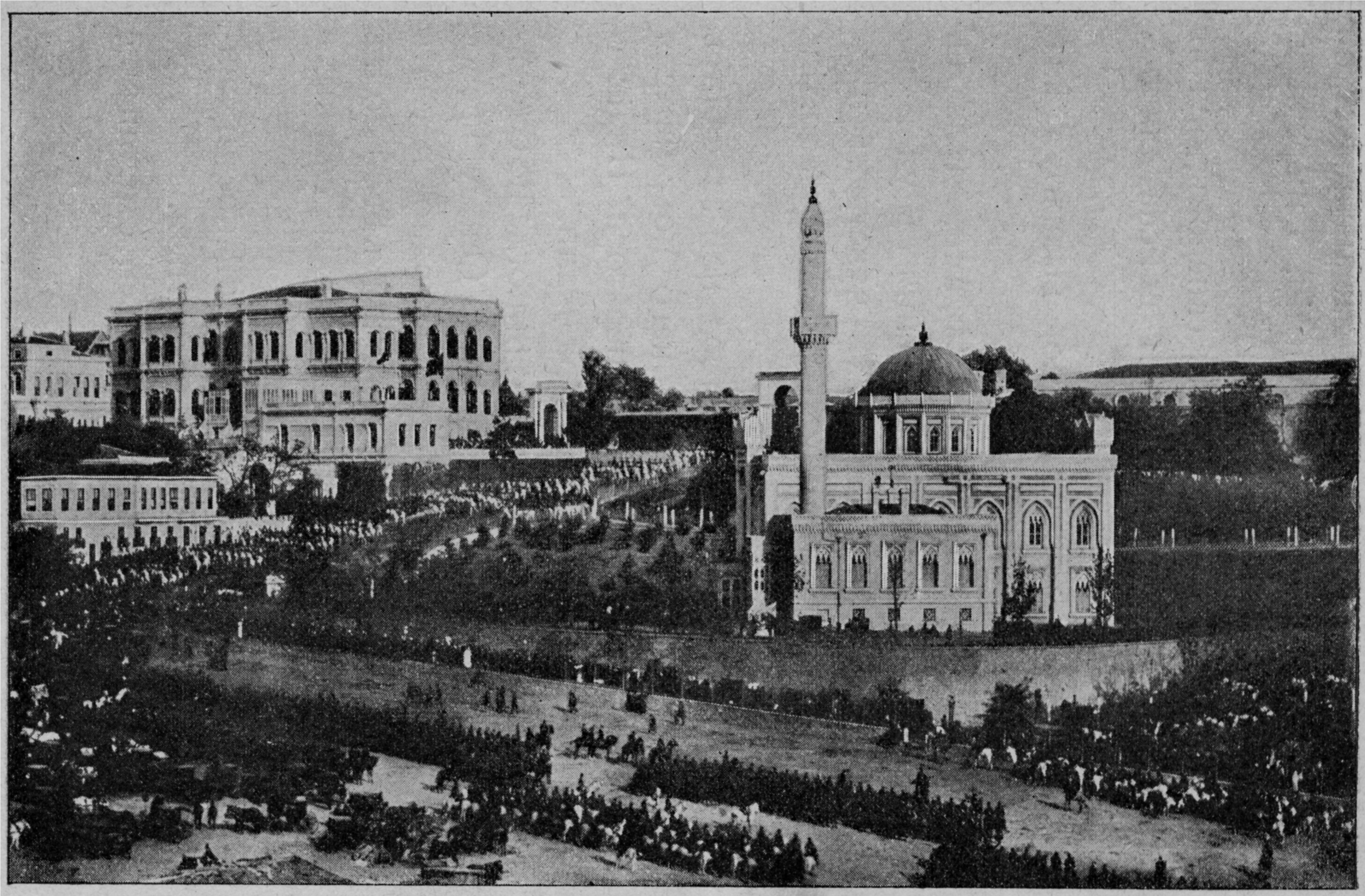
Photo of the Yıldız Palace grounds in 1905. Some of the pavilions are visible on the left, the Hamidiye Mosque stands on the right.

One of the last major Ottoman imperial creations was the Yıldız Palace, a sprawling complex of buildings set amidst a large wooded park (Yıldız Park) on a hillside overlooking the Bosphorus. The area had been a private garden of the sultans since the 17th century and was known as the Çırağan garden during the Tulip Period. Selim III, Mahmud II, Abdülmecid and Abdülaziz each erected various pavilions here, but it was Abdülhamid II (r. 1876–1909) who transformed it into an imperial palace, residence, and seat of government. After the massive single-block palace buildings like Dolmabahçe, the Yildiz Palace returned to the older tradition of creating many different structures with no overarching site plan. Unlike Topkapı Palace though, the structures are not linked together around courtyards and they instead resemble a kind of rural mountain village. Moreover, the palace and inner gardens were separated from the adjacent wooded park which was open to the public. One part of the palace complex formed its own private harem section. The most imposing structure in the center of the palace is the Büyük Mabeyn Köşk erected by Abdülaziz and designed by Agop and Sarkis Balyan. It has a traditional divanhane layout typical of earlier Ottoman pavilions and a Neoclassical design with Orientalist decoration similar to the contemporary Çırağan Palace.

The many subsequent buildings built under Abdülhamid II are less monumental and many of them were designed by Raimond D'Aronco in an Art Nouveau style. One of the largest and most interesting is the Şale or Chalet Pavilion, so-called because it was built to resemble a Swiss mountain chalet in the Alps. The palace complex also included a theatre, a greenhouse, stables, and an official mosque, the Hamidiye Mosque. Several other pavilions stand in the park outside the private palace enclosure such as the Malta Kiosk and the Çadır Kiosk, both designed by the Balyans under Sultan Abdülaziz. The mosque, designed by Sarkis Balyan for Abdülhamid II and dated to 1886, has no resemblance at all to the traditional form of Ottoman mosques and looks more like a church. It is decorated with neo-Gothic and Orientalist details, some of which recall the decoration of the earlier Çırağan Palace and the Pertevniyal Valide Mosque (discussed below).

Yıldız Palace complex

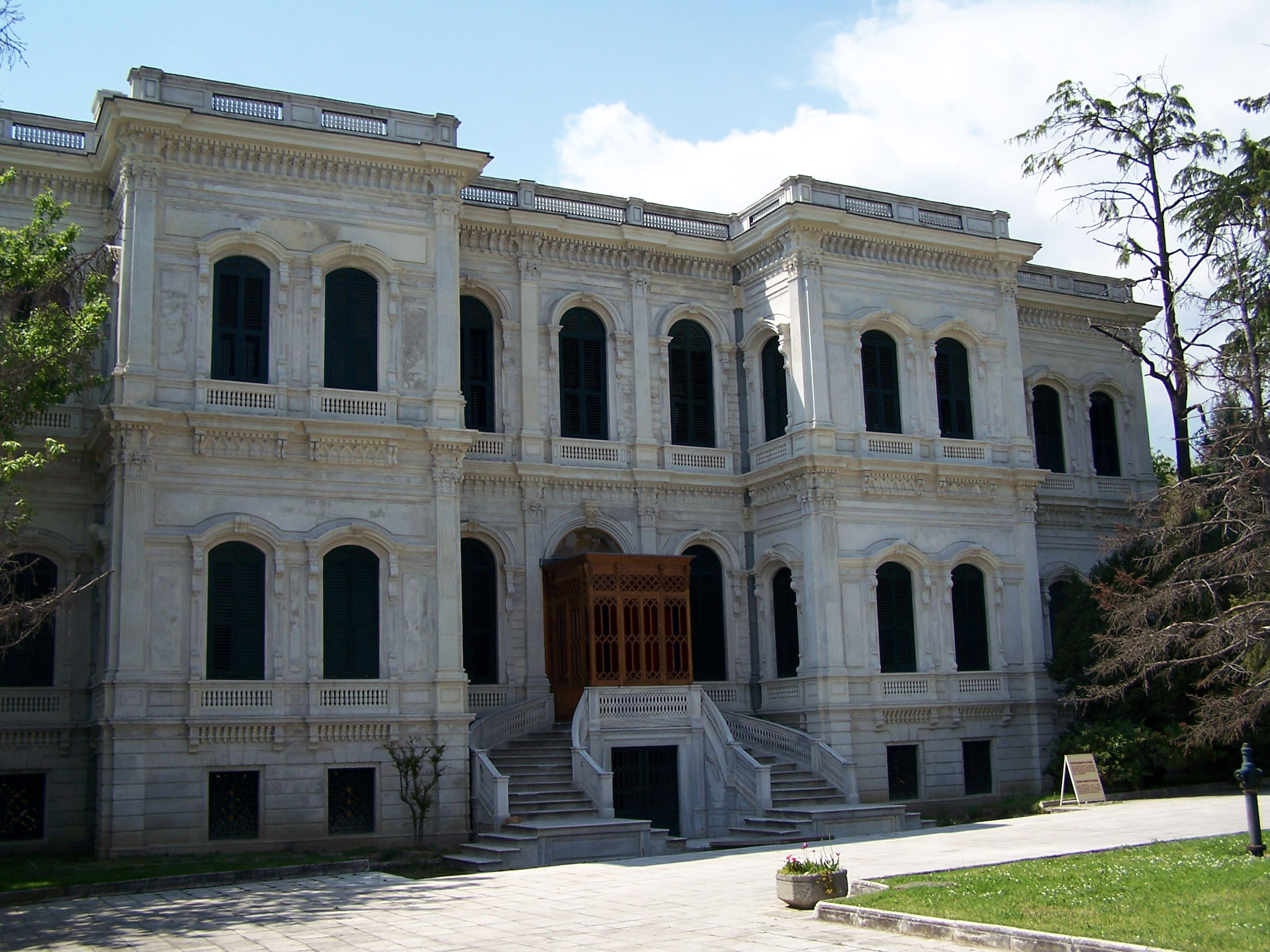
Büyük Mabeyn Köşkü, built during reign of Abdülaziz (r. 1861–1876)

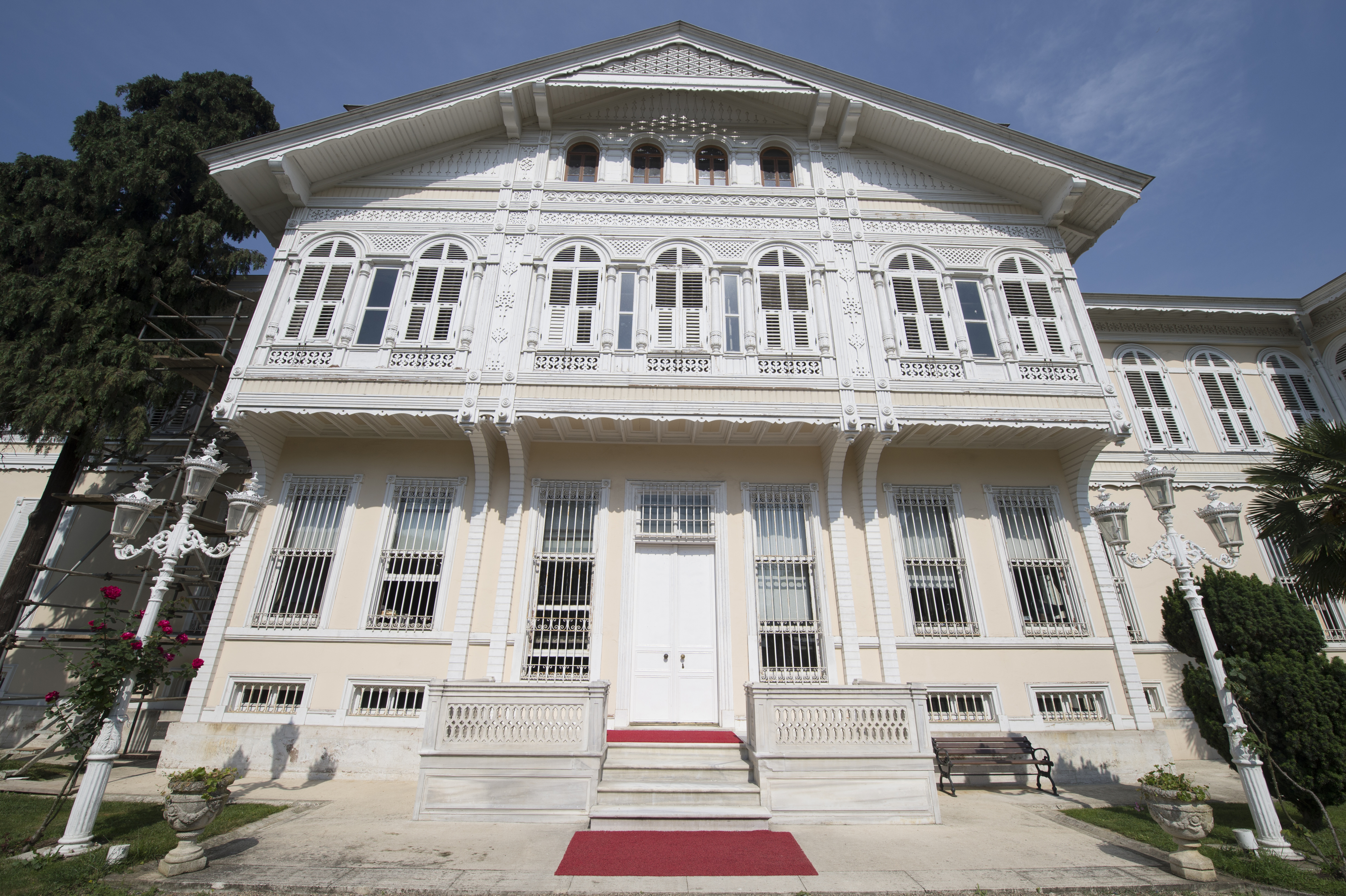
Chalet Pavilion, built by Abdülhamid II (multiple building phases)

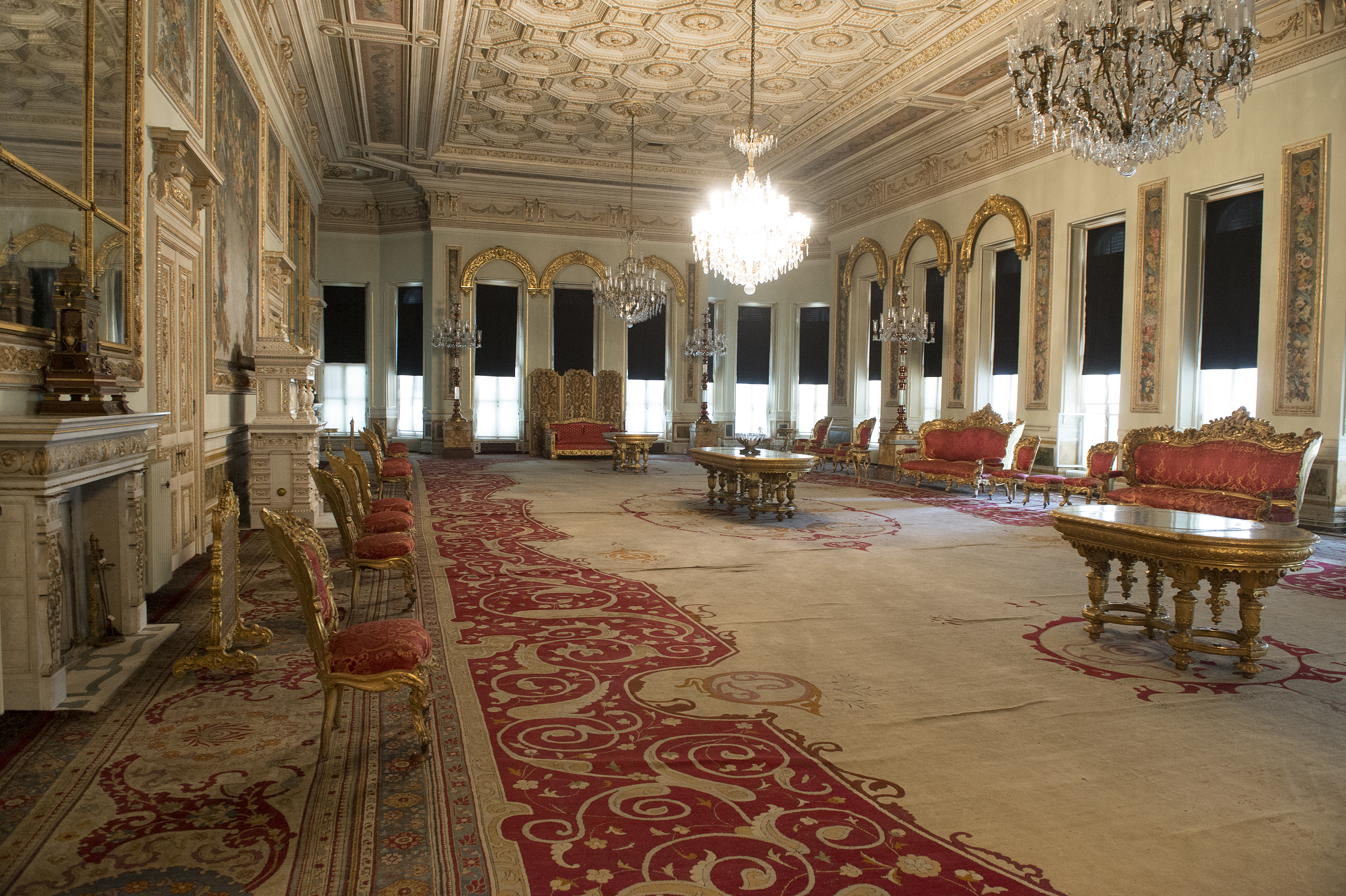
The "Mother-of-Pearl" Hall inside the Chalet Pavilion

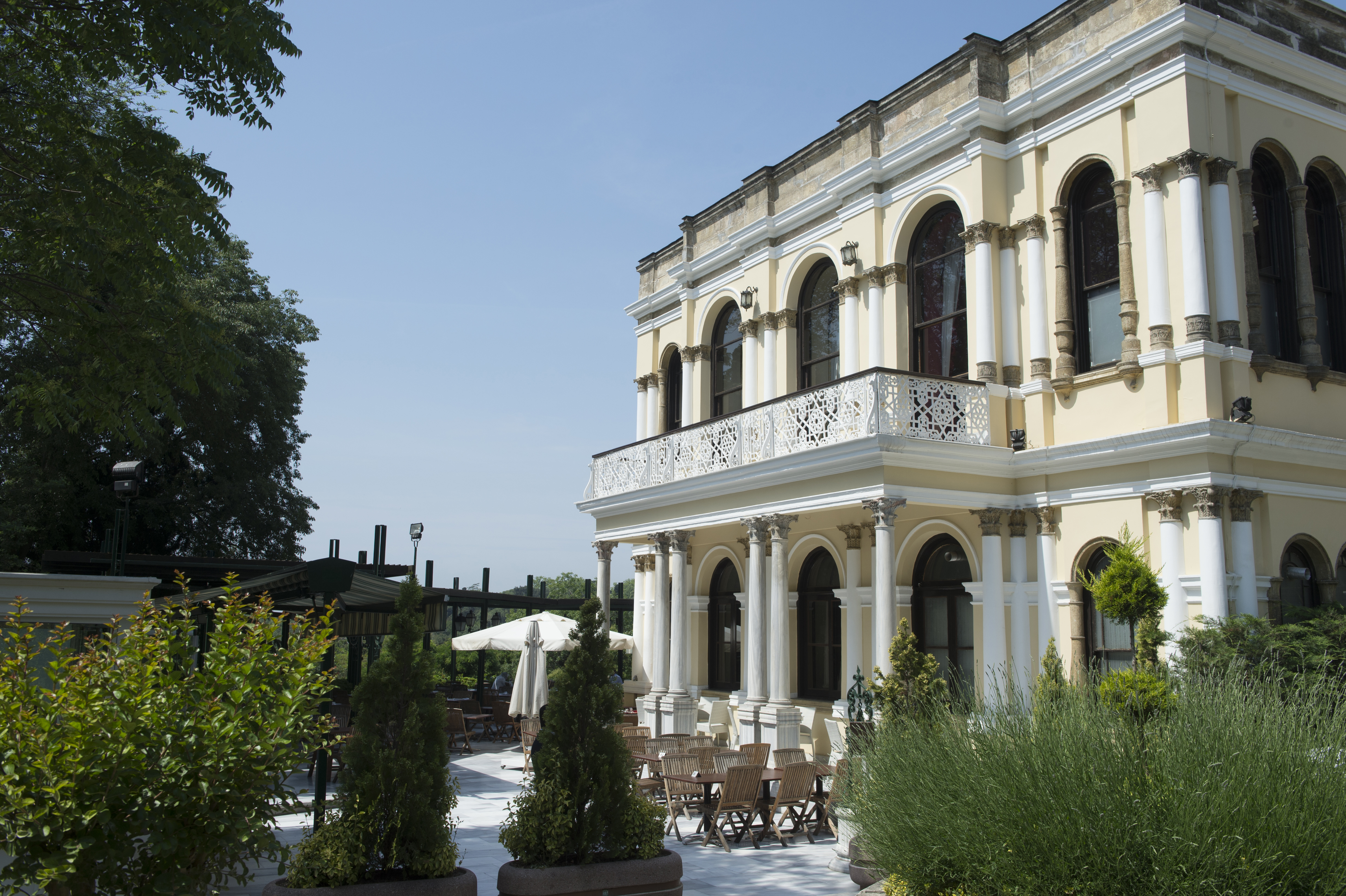
Malta Kiosk in Yıldız Park

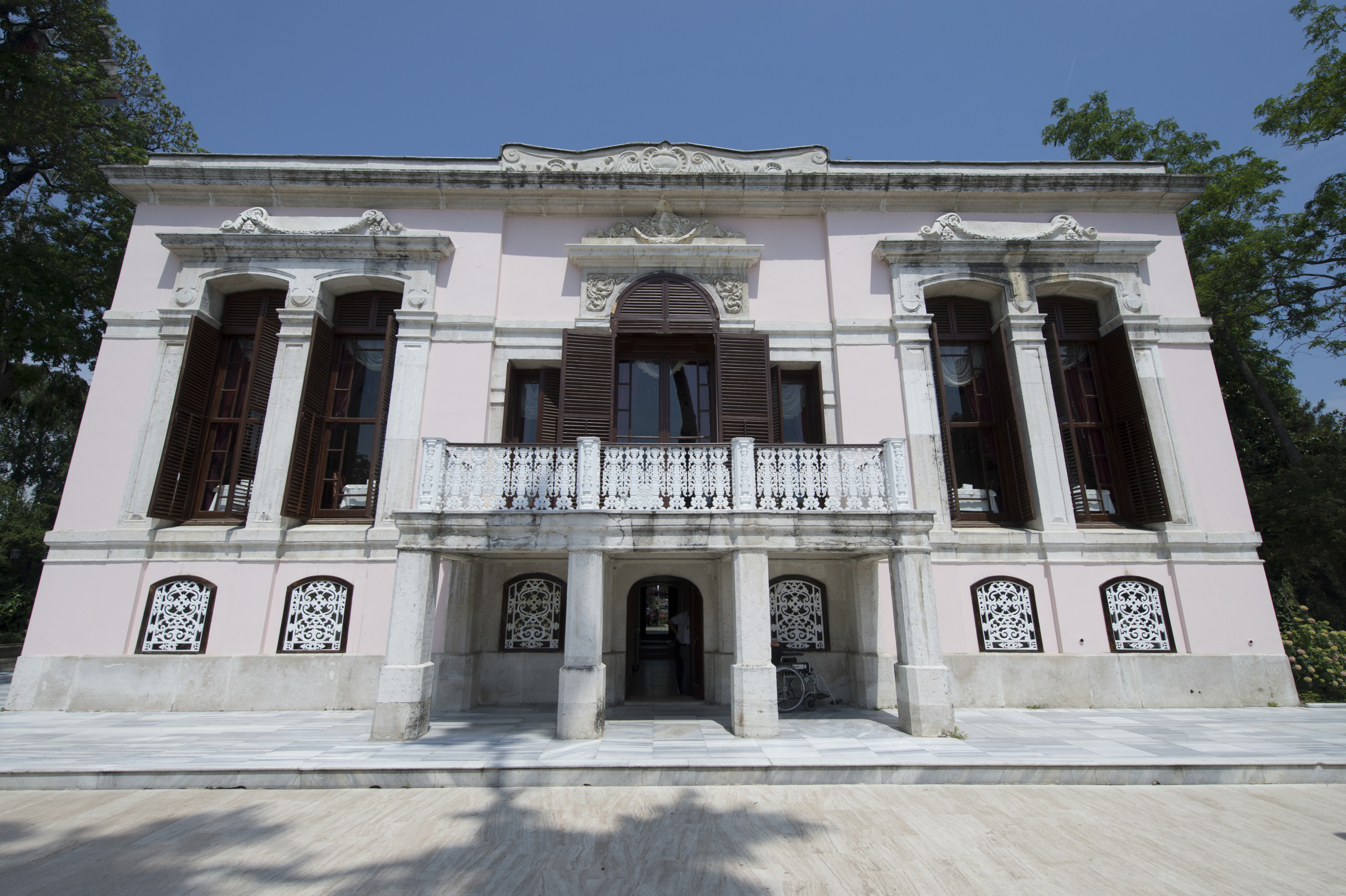
Çadir Kiosk in Yıldız Park

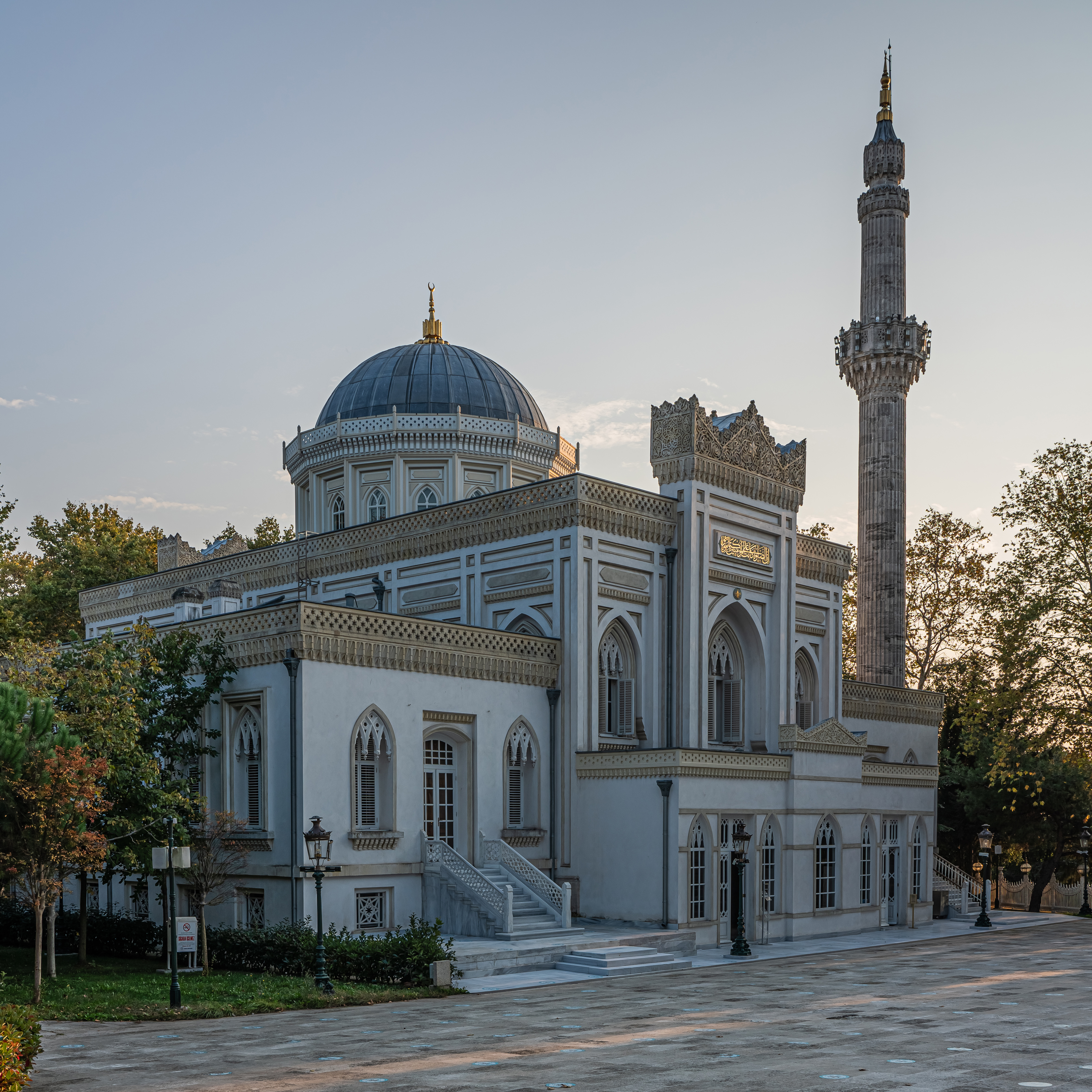
Hamidiye Mosque (1886), the official mosque of the palace

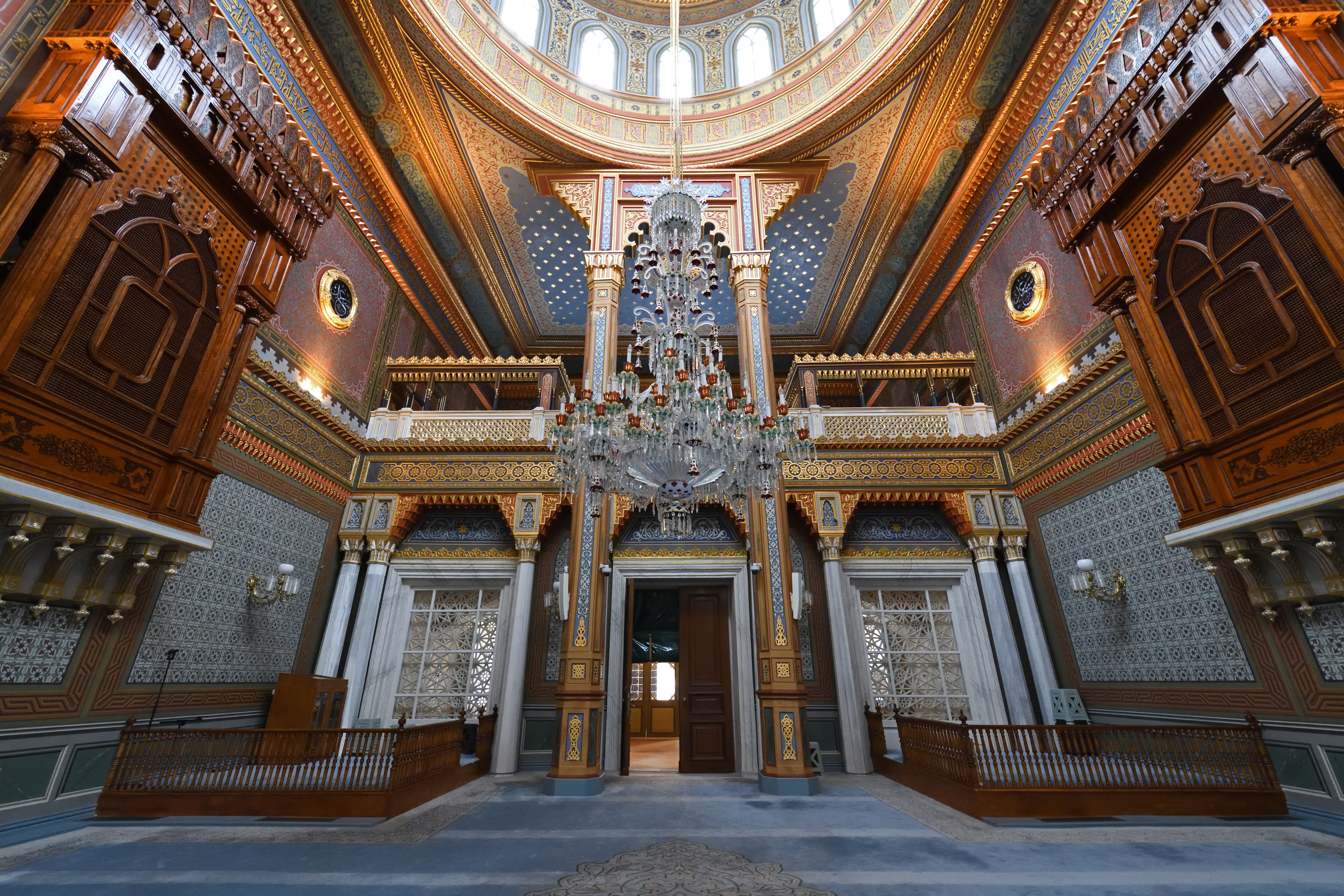
Interior of Hamidiye Mosque: view towards the rear and the imperial balconies

=== Mosques ===
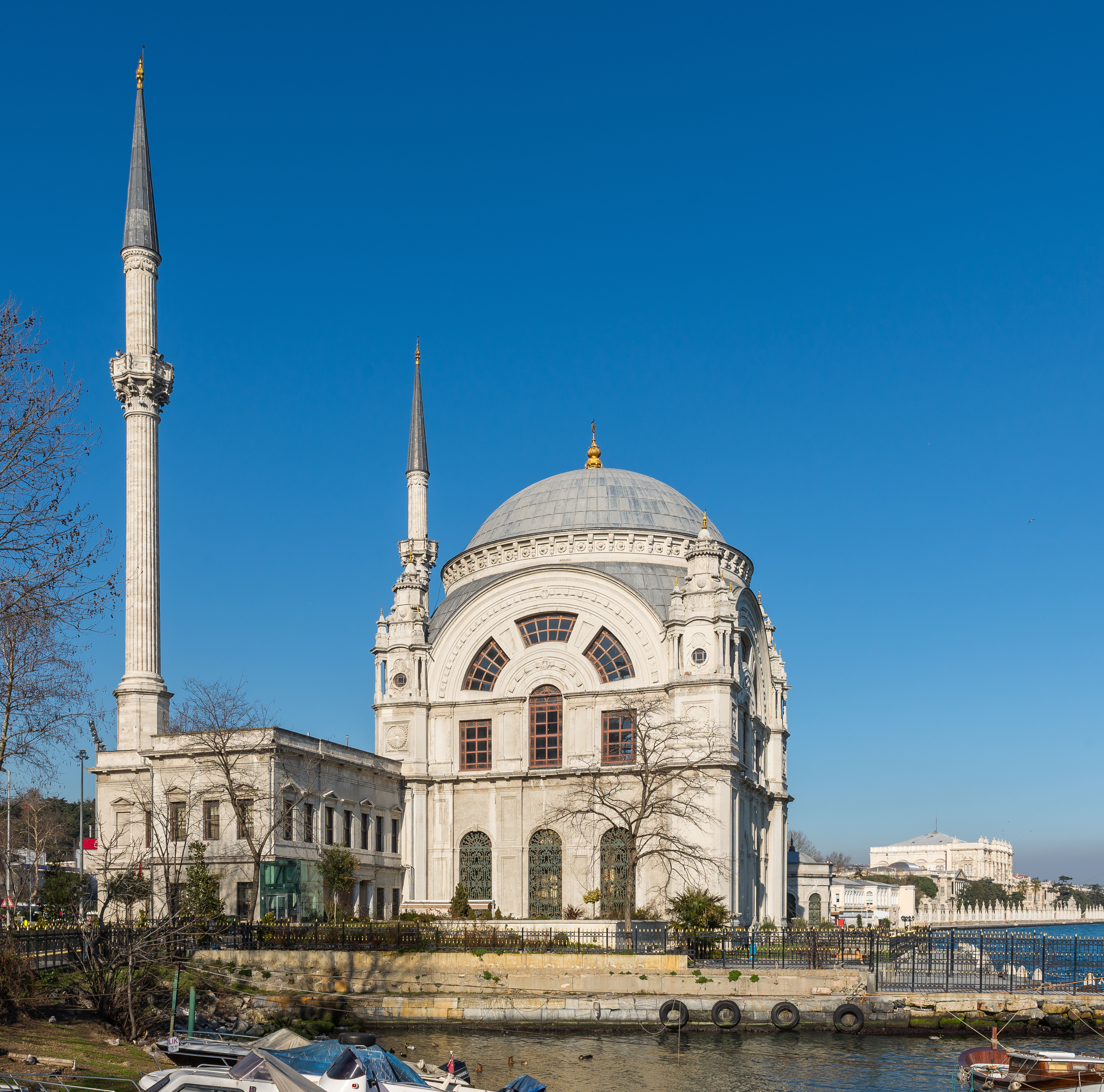
Dolmabahçe Mosque, Istanbul (1853–1855), seen from the water

After the Nusretiye Mosque, one of the earliest mosques designed by the Balyan family is the Küçuk Mecidiye Mosque in Istanbul, near Yıldız, which was built in 1848. At the same time as the Dolmabahçe Palace was being built, Garabet and Nikogos Balyan also built the nearby Dolmabahçe Mosque, commissioned by Bezmi'alem Valide Sultan in 1853 but finished after her death by her son Abdülmecid in 1855. The mosque is Neoclassical in style and distinguished by its minarets which are shaped like Corinthian columns up to their balcony levels. It is a single-domed building fronted by a large and imposing imperial pavilion. The mosque's upper windows are arranged in a semi-circular wheel-like design under the arches that support the dome.

The Ortaköy Mosque (or Büyük Mecidiye Mosque), located further northeast on a small promontory along the Bosphorus shore, has a very similar design that is considered more successful. The mosque was once again designed by Garabet Balyan and his son Nikogos and was built between 1854 and 1856 – although Goodwin and Kuban cite the year of construction as 1853. The Balyans likely worked as a team in order to produce so many works in such a short period. The mosque has a Baroque appearance in its use of strong curves but it features an eclectic mix of styles, except for the imperial pavilion in front which is entirely Neoclassical. The mosque is covered in highly ornate and sculptural details that recall the style of the Ceremonial Hall and gates of the Dolmabahçe Palace.

The Pertevniyal Valide Mosque in Istanbul was built in the Aksaray neighbourhood of Istanbul in 1871 in honour of Abdülaziz's mother. It is usually attributed to the Italian architect Montani Efendi or to Agop Balyan, although it's possible that both were responsible for different aspects of the design. The mosque combines Ottoman, Gothic, and Empire styles. One notable change from previous mosques is the decrease in the imperial pavilion's size relative to the mosque, reversing the previous trend of the 18th-19th centuries. The use of Ottoman revival features in this mosque is also an indication that the foundations for a future Ottoman revivalist movement were already being laid at this time. Another eclectic-style mosque of the same period is the Aziziye Mosque in Konya, built in 1872. This is the only imperial mosque built in Anatolia during the late Ottoman period.

Mosques in eclectic styles

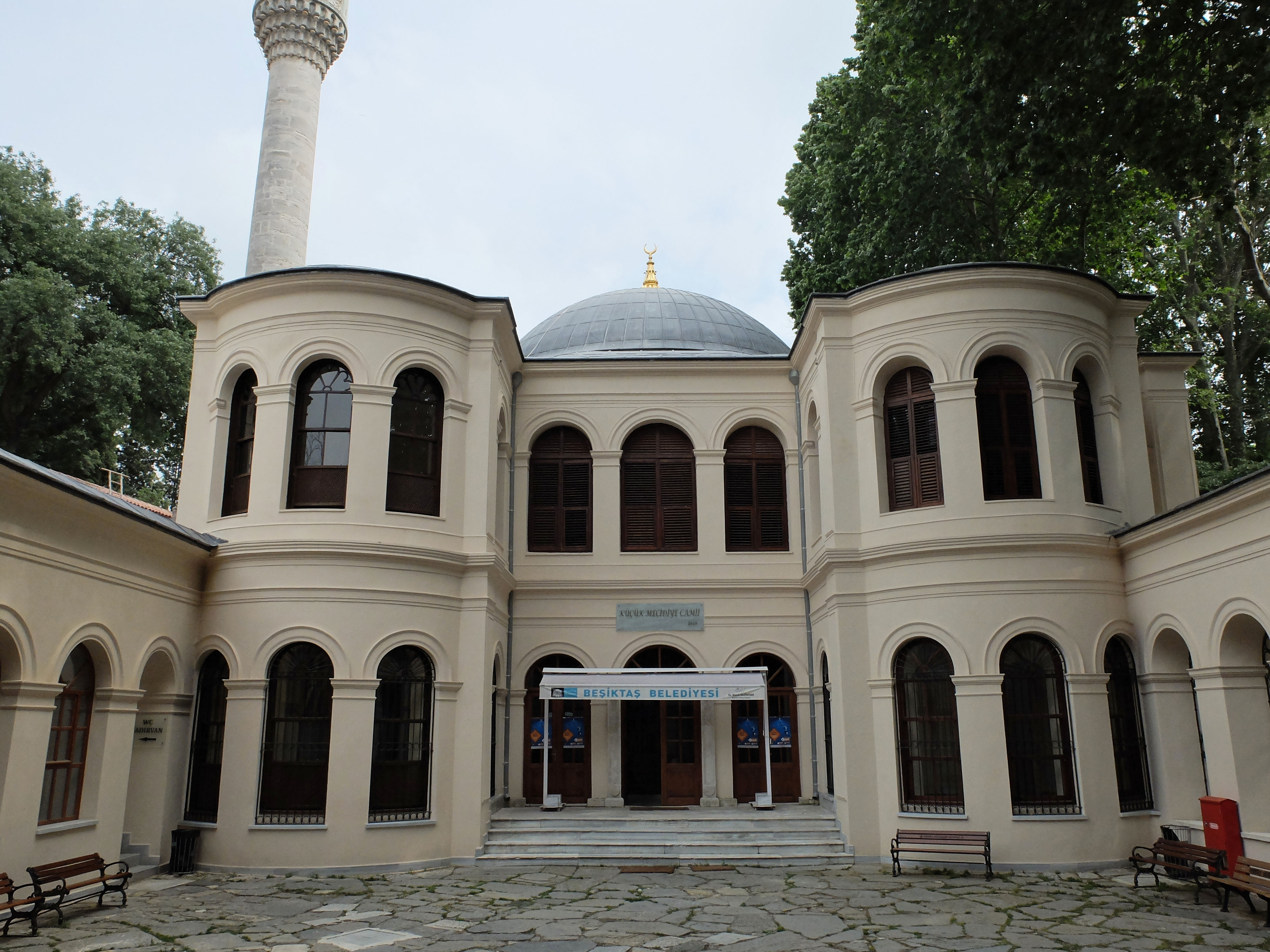
Küçük Mecidiye Mosque, Istanbul (1848): front view facing the imperial pavilion

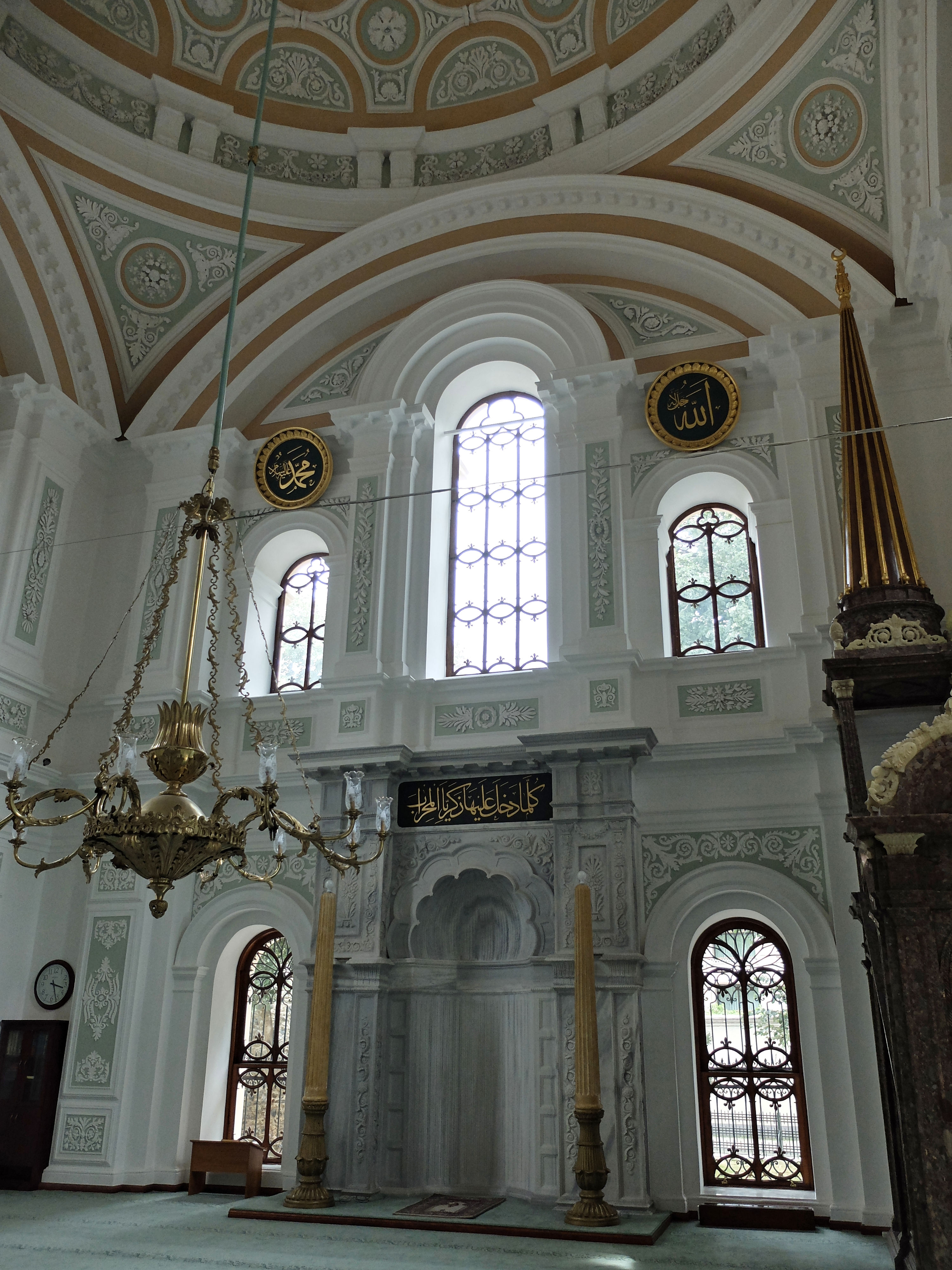
Küçük Mecidiye Mosque interior

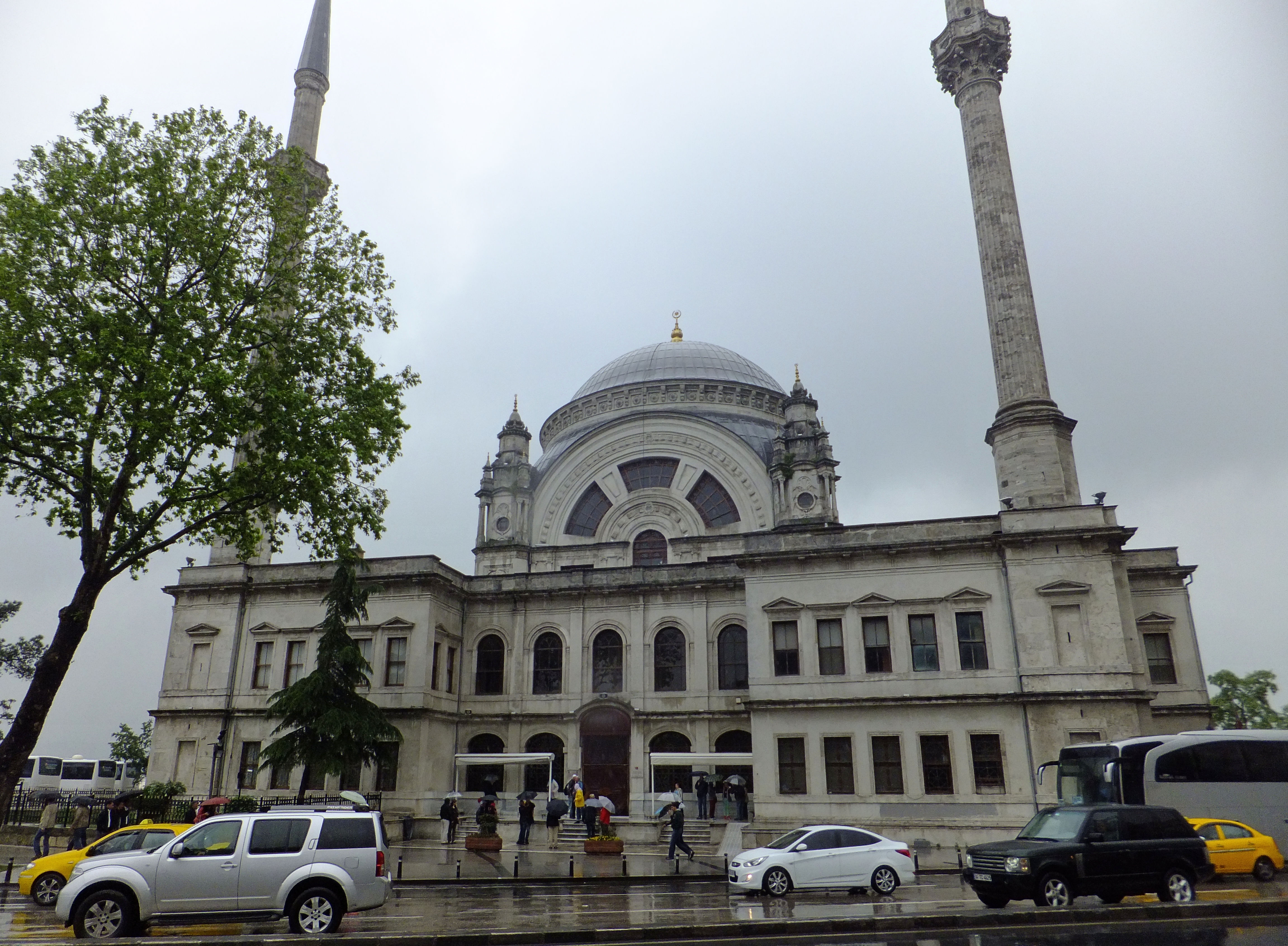
Front view of the Dolmabahçe Mosque and its imperial pavilion

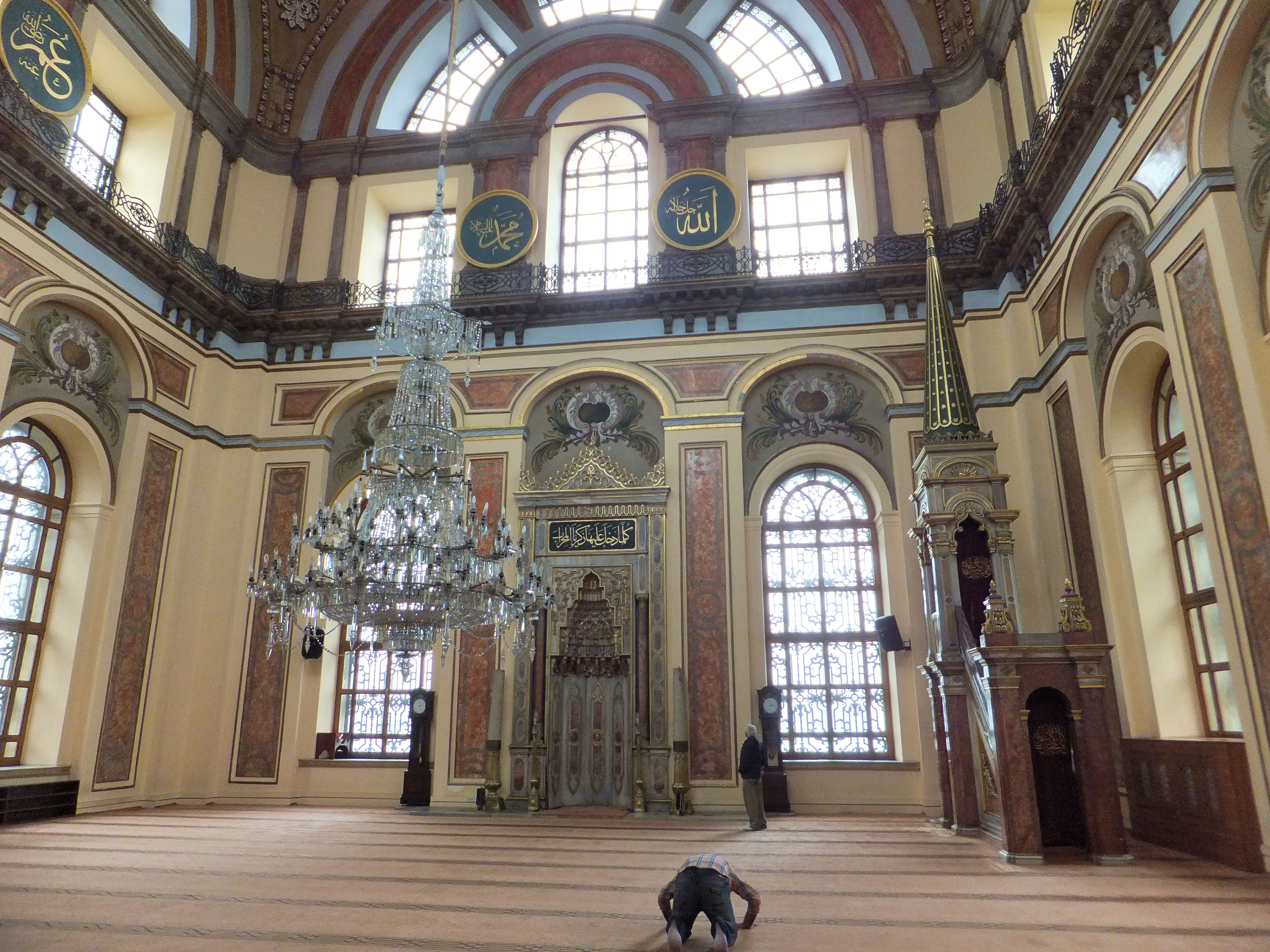
Dolmabahçe Mosque interior

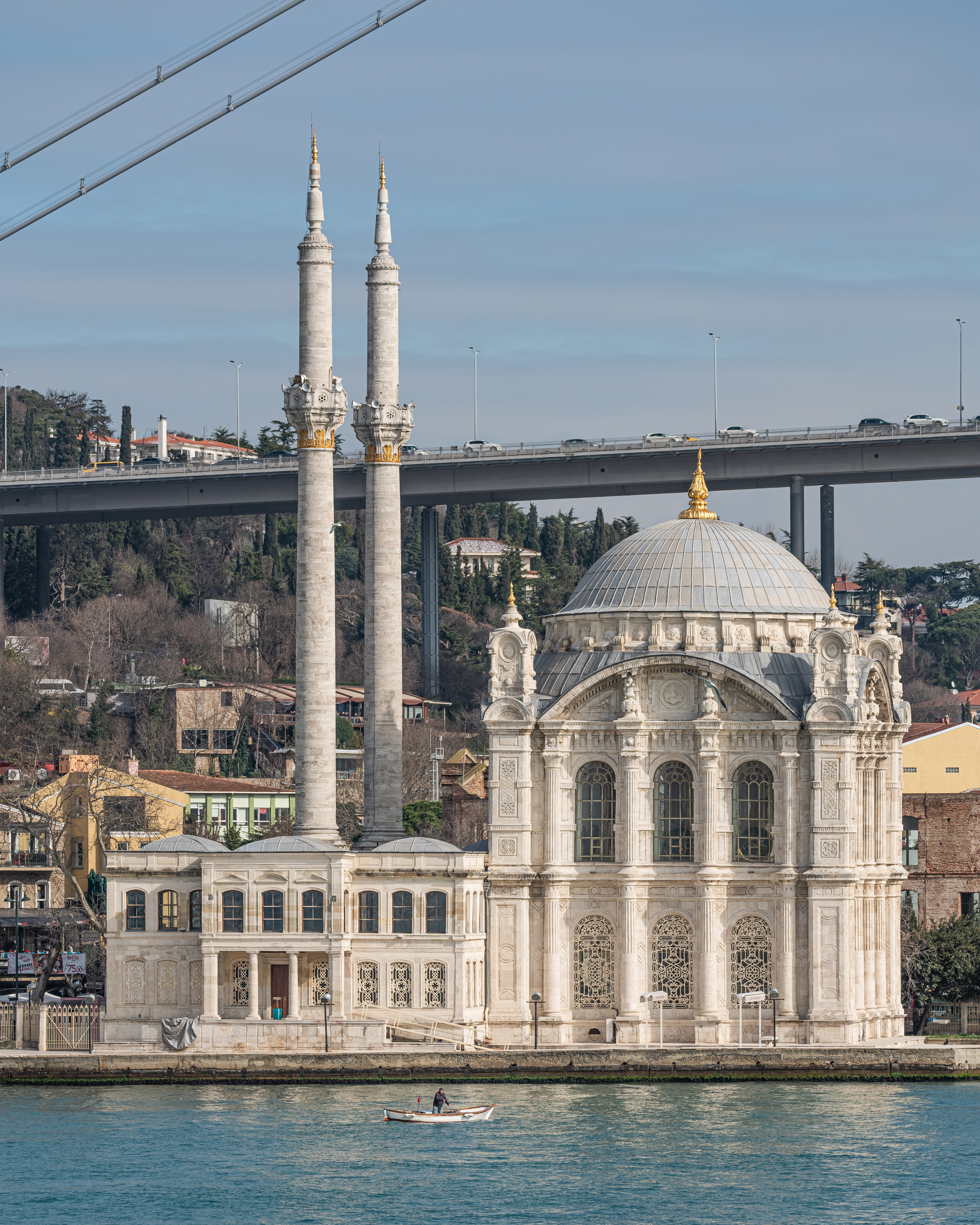
Ortaköy Mosque, Istanbul (1854–1856)

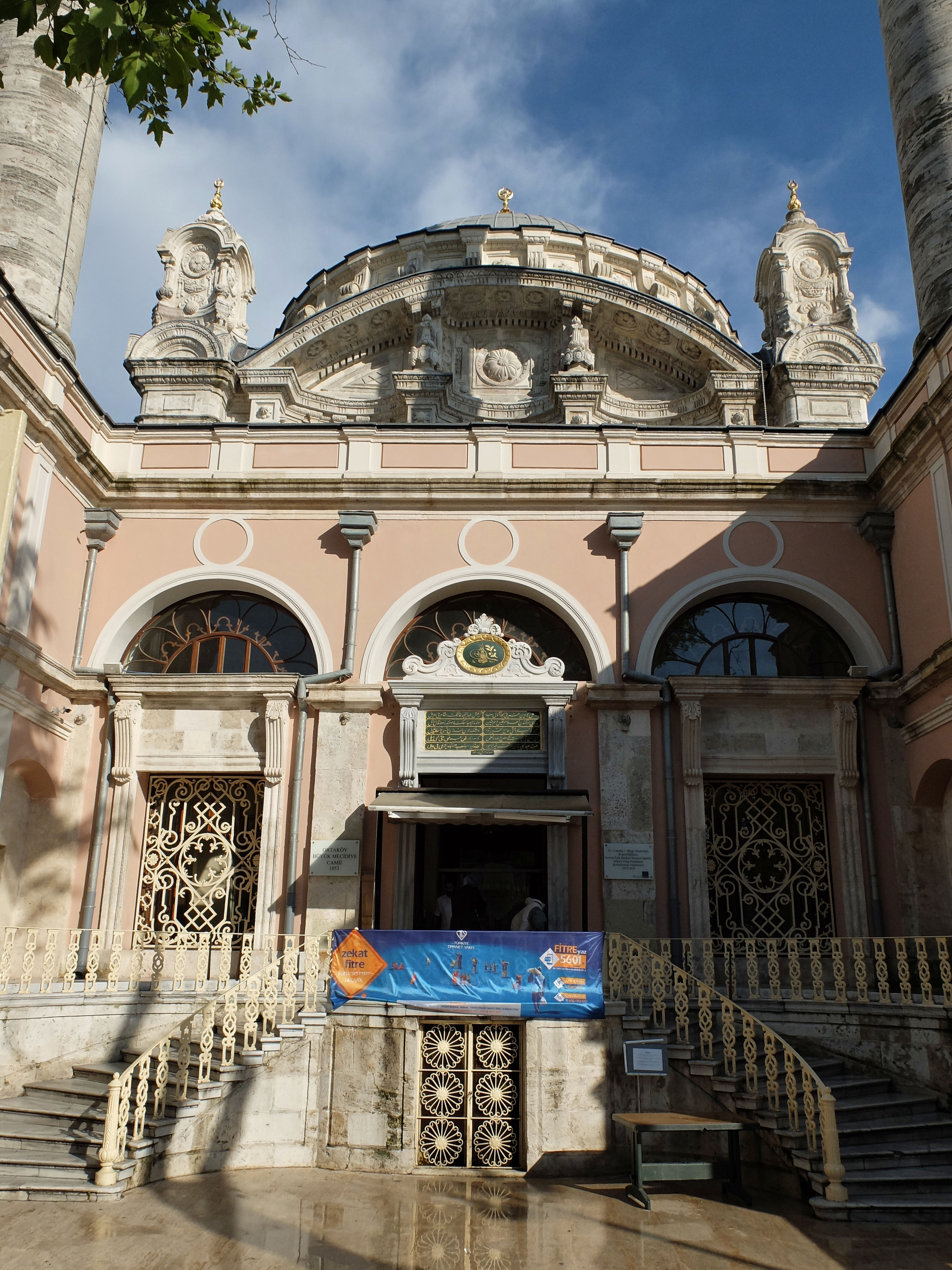
Ortaköy Mosque entrance, between the two wings of the imperial pavilion

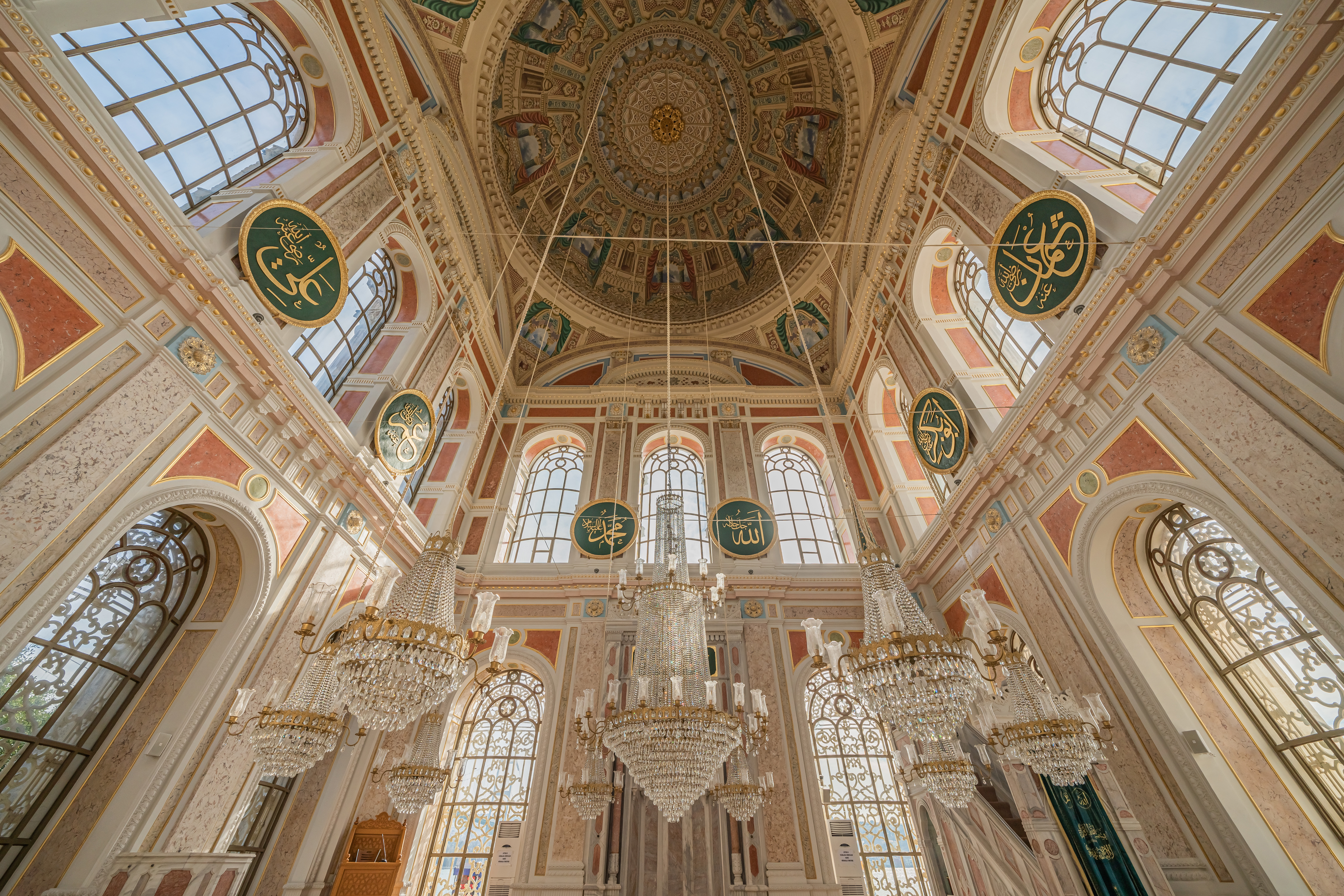
Interior of the Ortaköy Mosque

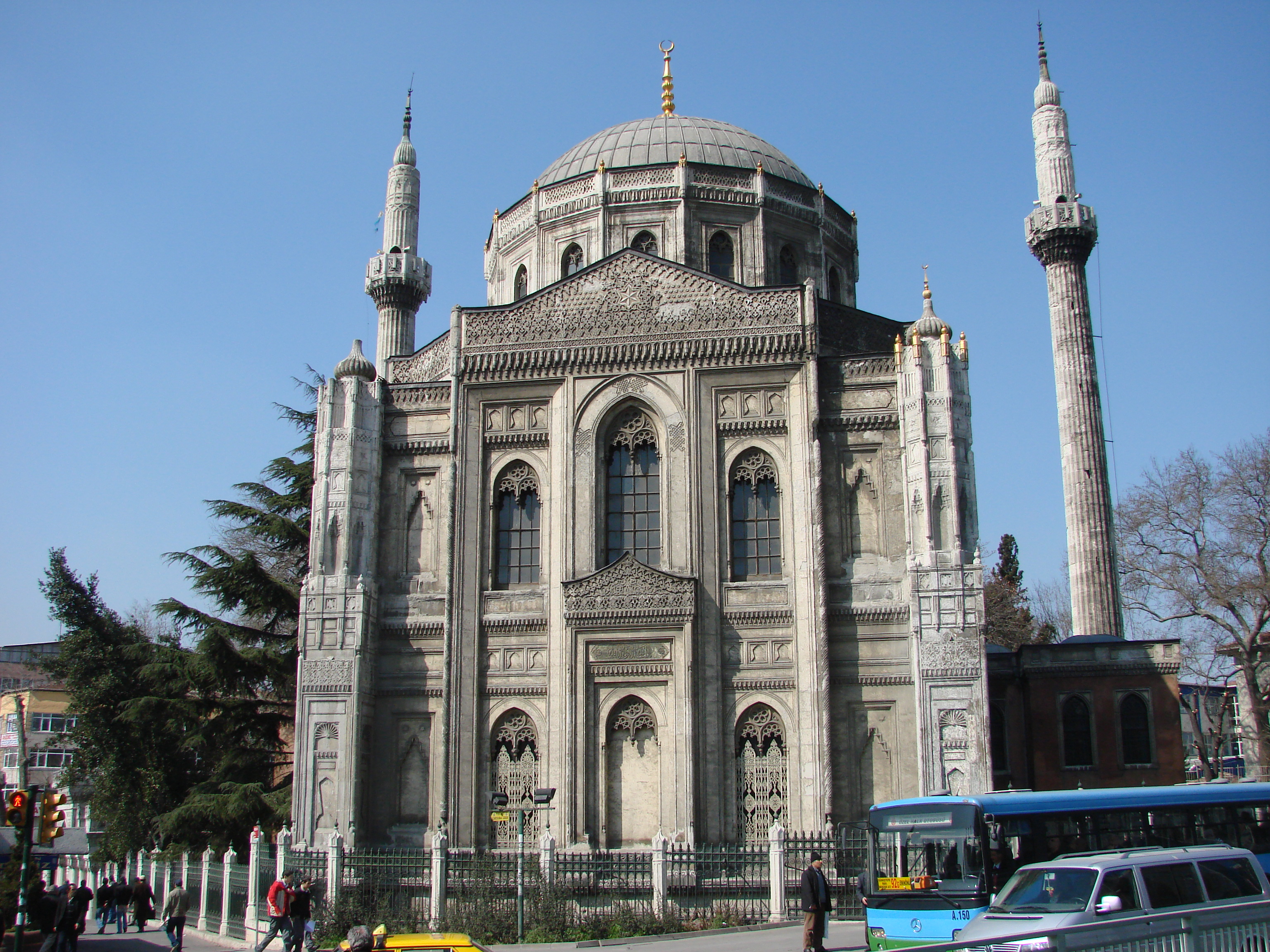
Pertevniyal Valide Mosque, Istanbul (1871)

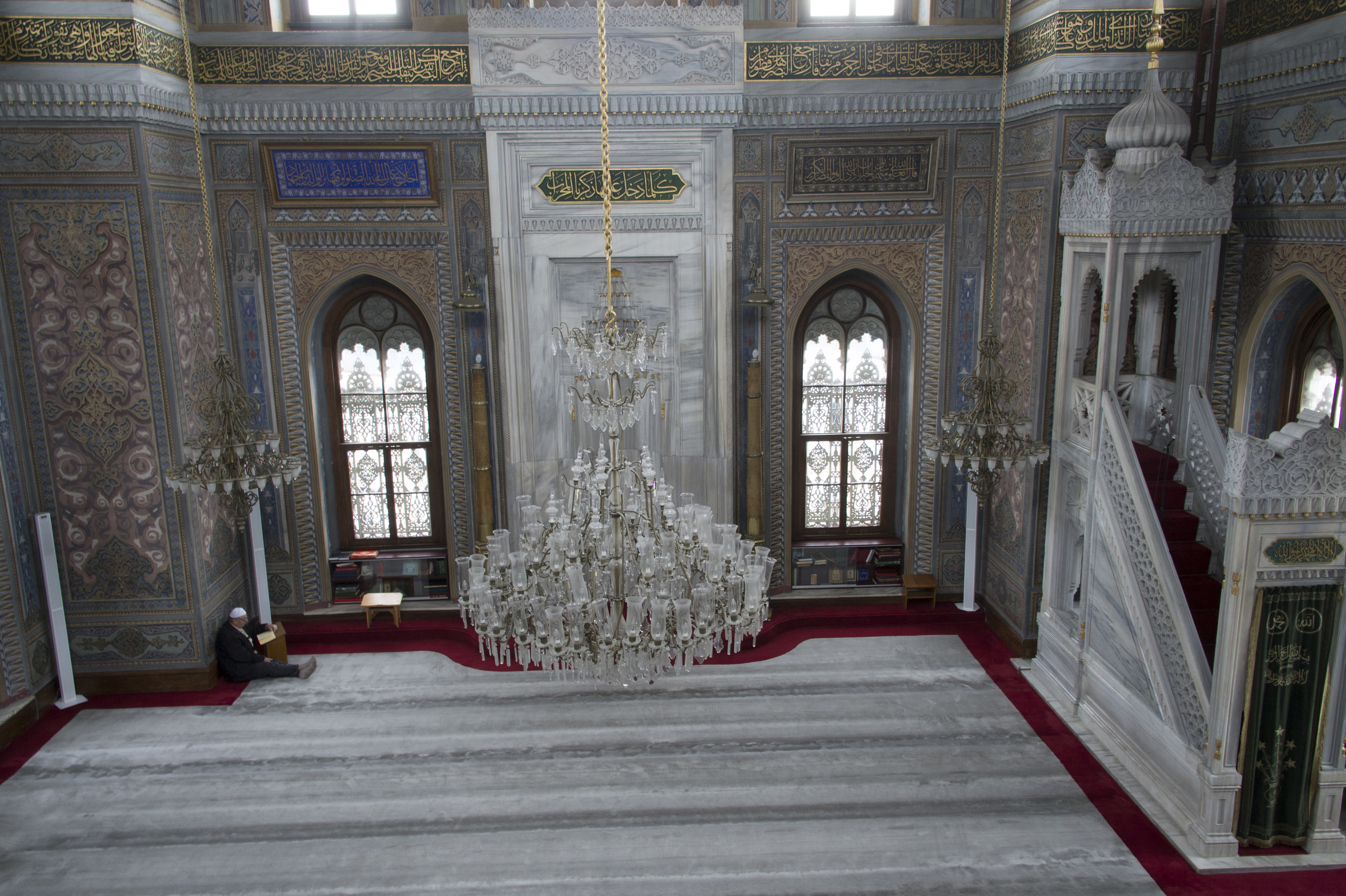
Interior of the Pertevniyal Valide Mosque

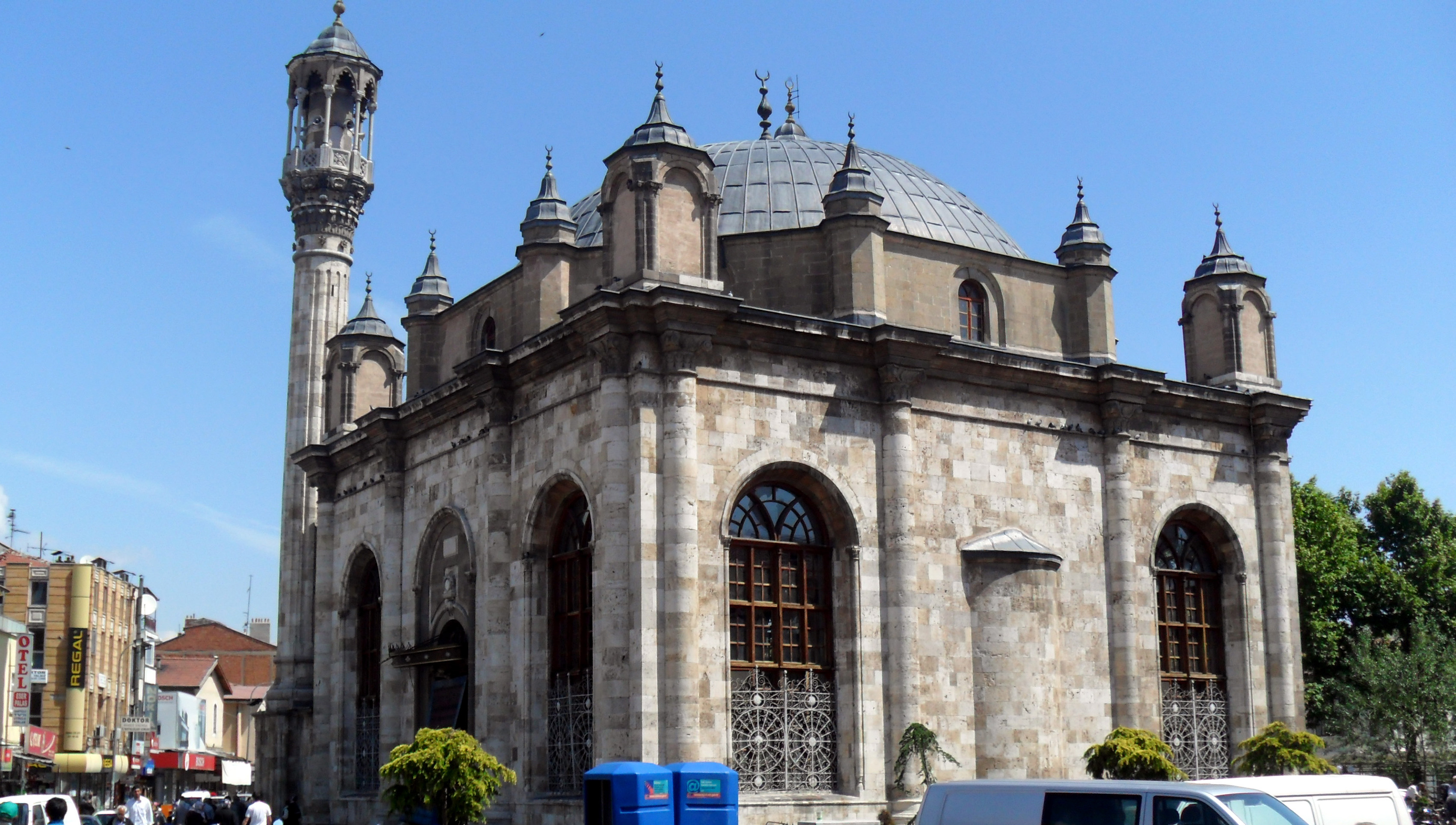
Aziziye Mosque, Konya (1872)

=== Churches and synagogues ===
The Tanzimat reforms also granted Christians and Jews the right to freely build new centers of worship, which resulted in the significant construction, renovation, and expansion of churches and synagogues. Most of these new constructions followed the same eclecticism that prevailed in the rest of Ottoman architecture of the 19th century.

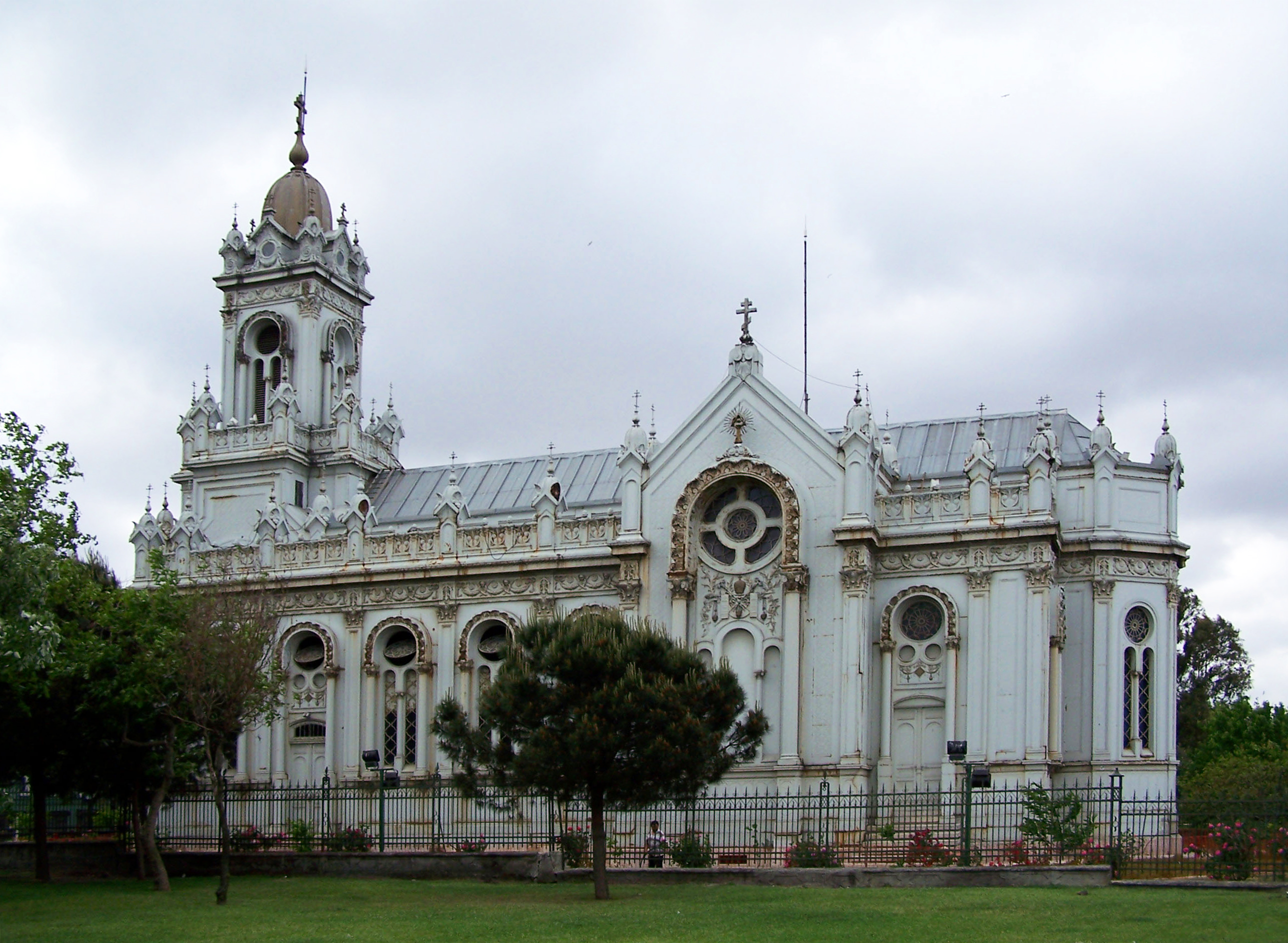
Stefan Sveti Church (1895–1898), the first steel building in Istanbul

Among the notable examples of Greek Orthodox churches is the Hagia Triada Church, a prominent building near Taksim Square in Beyoğlu which was built by the architect Vasilaki Ioannidi in 1880. Another is the Hagia Kyriaki Church in the Kumkapı neighbourhood, which was built in 1895 by local architects for the Karaman Greek community. Hagia Kyriaki is one of the few modern churches in Istanbul built in the Byzantine tradition, using a central-domed layout. The Stefan Sveti Church (or Church of St. Stephen of the Bulgars) is a Bulgarian Orthodox church built between 1895 and 1898 in an eclectic style, located in the Balat neighbourhood. It was the first steel building in Istanbul, designed by architect Hovsep Aznavu. Its pieces were fabricated abroad and then assembled in Istanbul.

Among examples of 19th-century Armenian churches, the Surp Asdvadzadzin Church in Beşiktaş (not to be confused with the Surp Asdvadzadzin Patriarchal Church) was built in 1838 by Garabet Balyan. Its style deviated from traditional Armenian architecture in Istanbul and reflected instead the Neoclassical or Empire style that the Balyans used during the reign of Mahmud II, including an Ottoman-style dome. The Surp Asdvadzadzin Church in Gaziantep (later converted to the Kurtuluş Mosque) was built between 1878 and 1893 in an eclectic style that references European styles as well as local influences such as ablaq masonry, demonstrating that eclecticism was present far outside Istanbul.

Later on, the largest and most famous Catholic church in Istanbul, the Church of St. Anthony in Beyoğlu, was built between 1906 and 1912 in a neo-Gothic style by architect Giulio Mongeri.

In addition to places of worship, new educational institutions and colleges associated with churches were built. In Fener, near the Greek Orthodox Patriarchal Church, the Phanar Greek Orthodox College (or Megalio Scholio in Greek) was built in 1881 to house a much older Greek educational institution. The structure is one of the most dominating features of the skyline in this area. The architect Konstantinos Dimandis most likely designed it with a neo-Byzantine style in mind.

The synagogues of Istanbul's longstanding Jewish community were comparatively unpretentious structures and few ancient synagogues have survived earthquakes and fires over the centuries. One of the oldest, the Ahrida Synagogue in Balat, was rebuilt in its current form in 1709 and reflects the architecture of the Tulip Period, though it was restored and refurbished again in the 19th century. Some notable 19th-century examples include the Italian Synagogue, built in the 1880s with a neo-Gothic façade, and the Ashkenazi Synagogue, inaugurated in 1900 with a European-style façade.

19th-century churches and synagogues

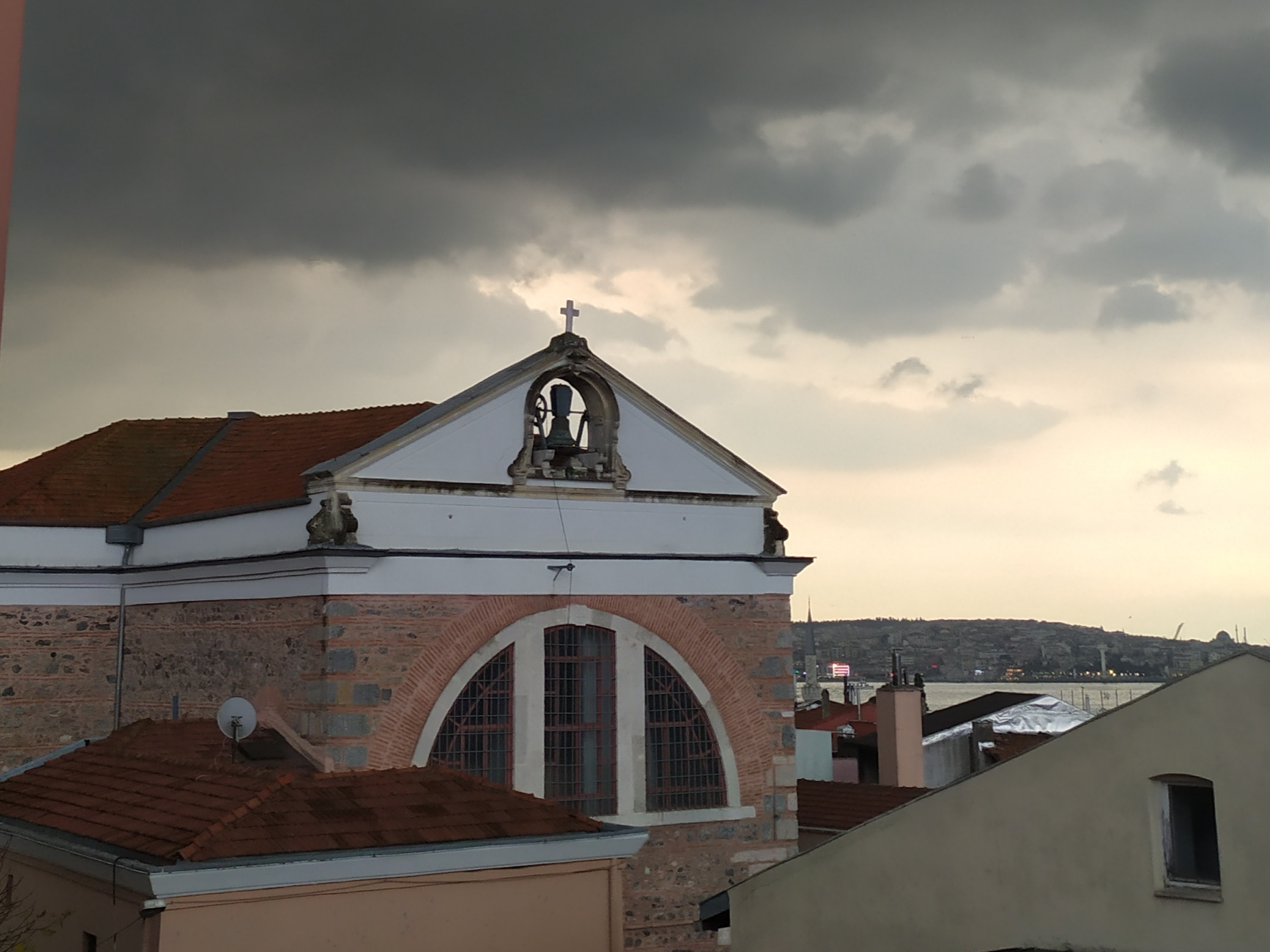
Surp Asdvadzadzin Church in Beşiktaş, Istanbul (1838)

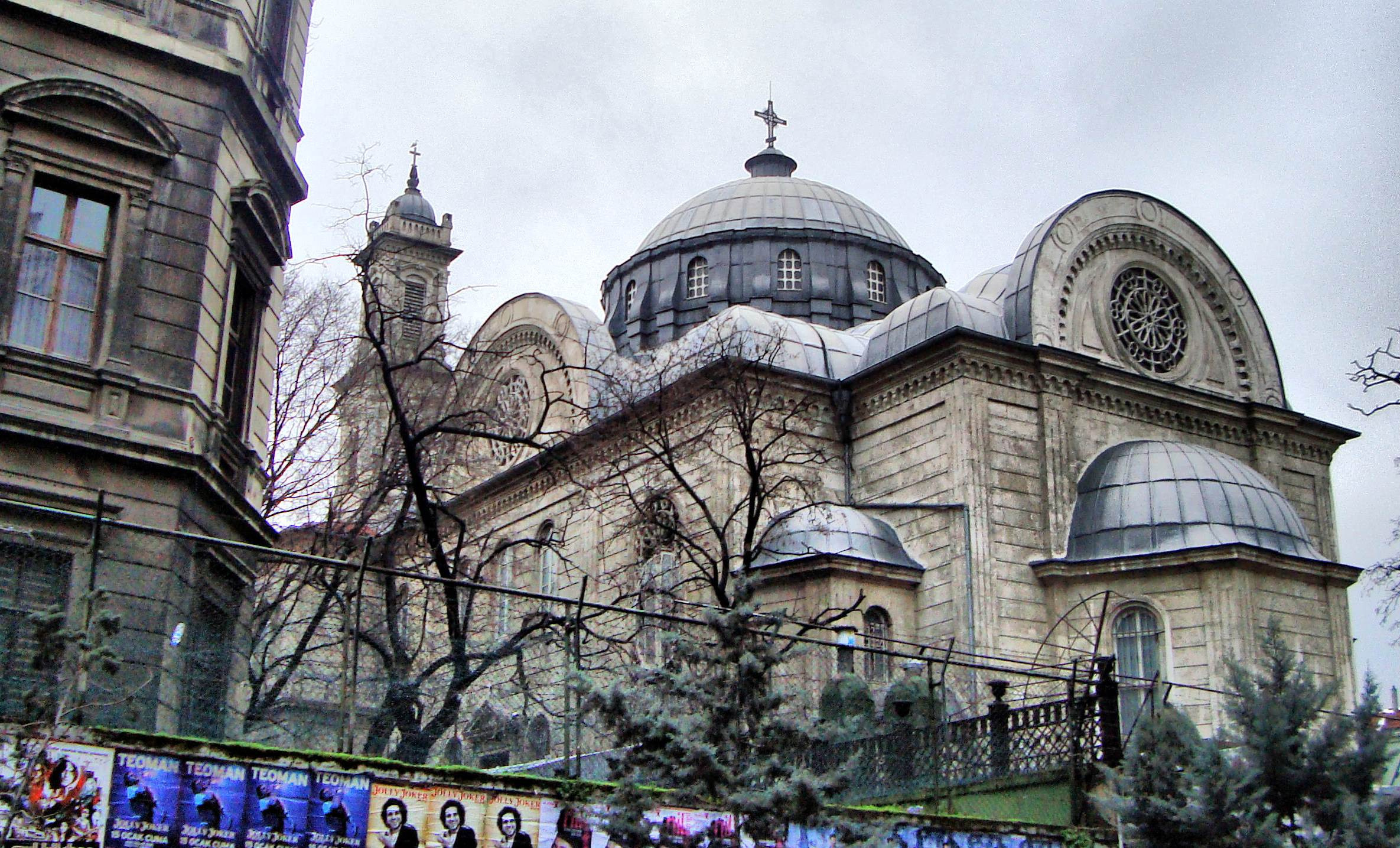
Hagia Triada Church in Beyoğlu, Istanbul (1880)

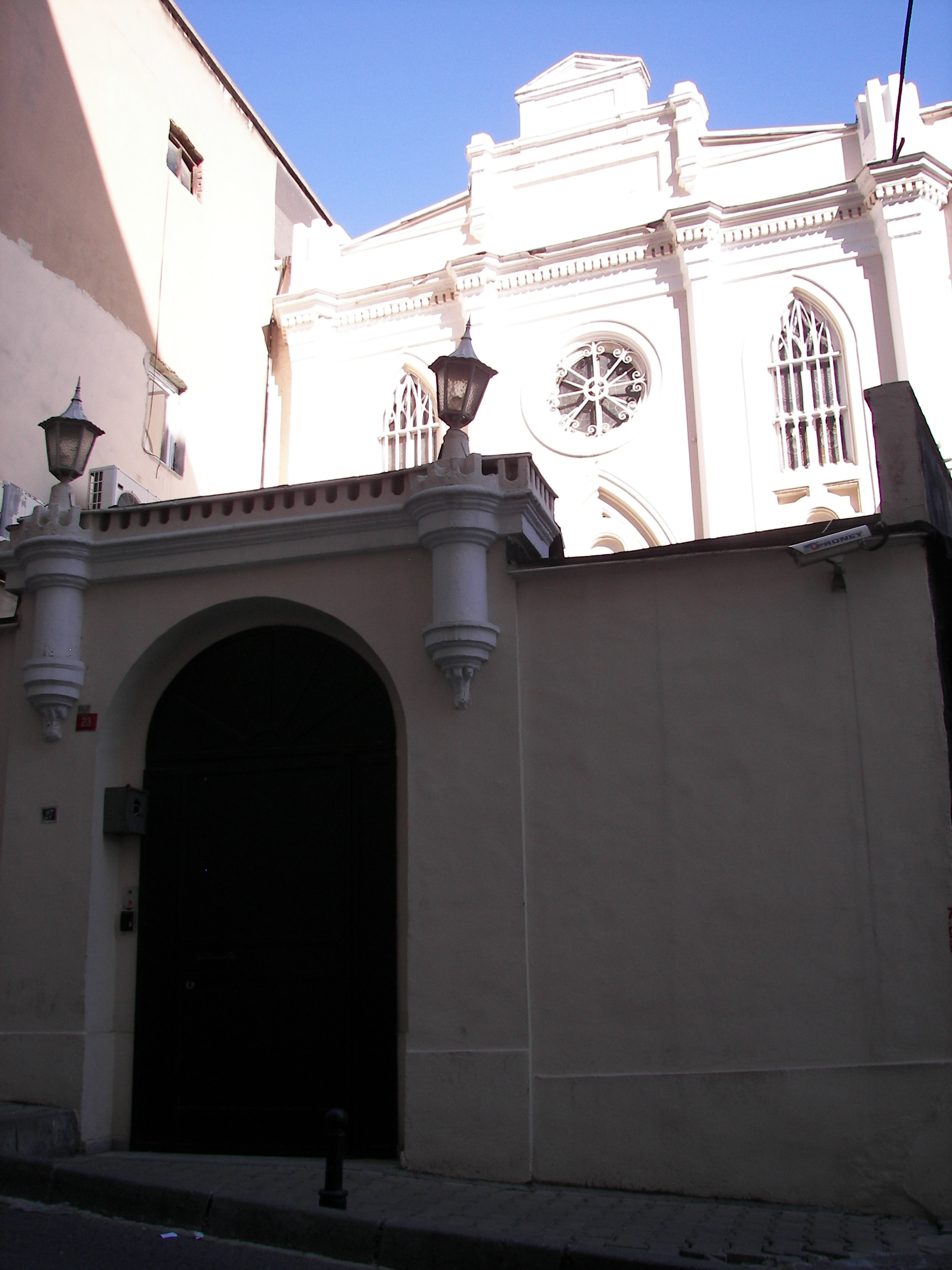
Italian Synagogue in Istanbul (1880s)

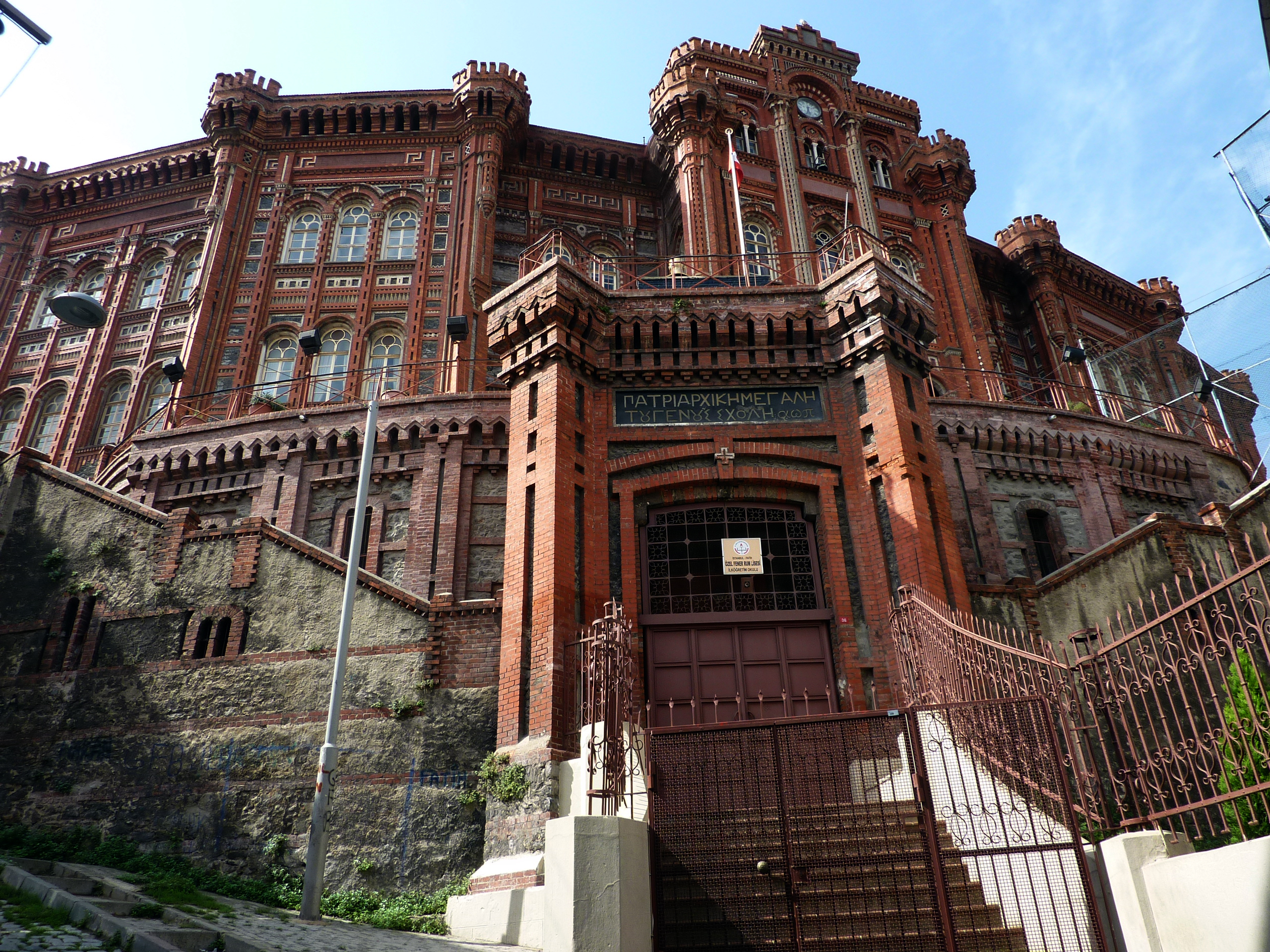
Phanar Greek Orthodox College building in Istanbul (1881)

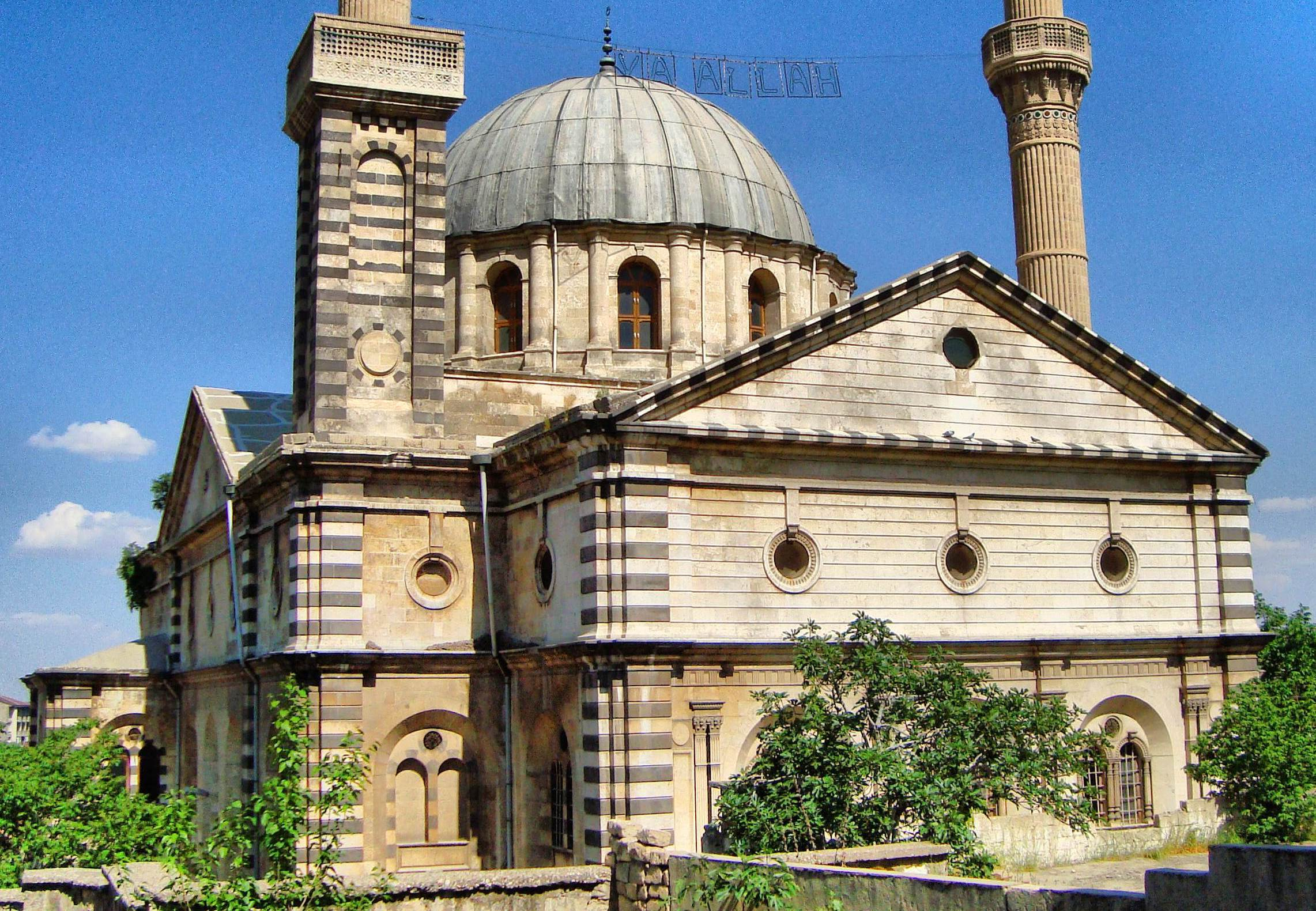
Surp Asdvadzadzin Church (Kurtuluş Mosque today) in Gaziantep(1878–1893)

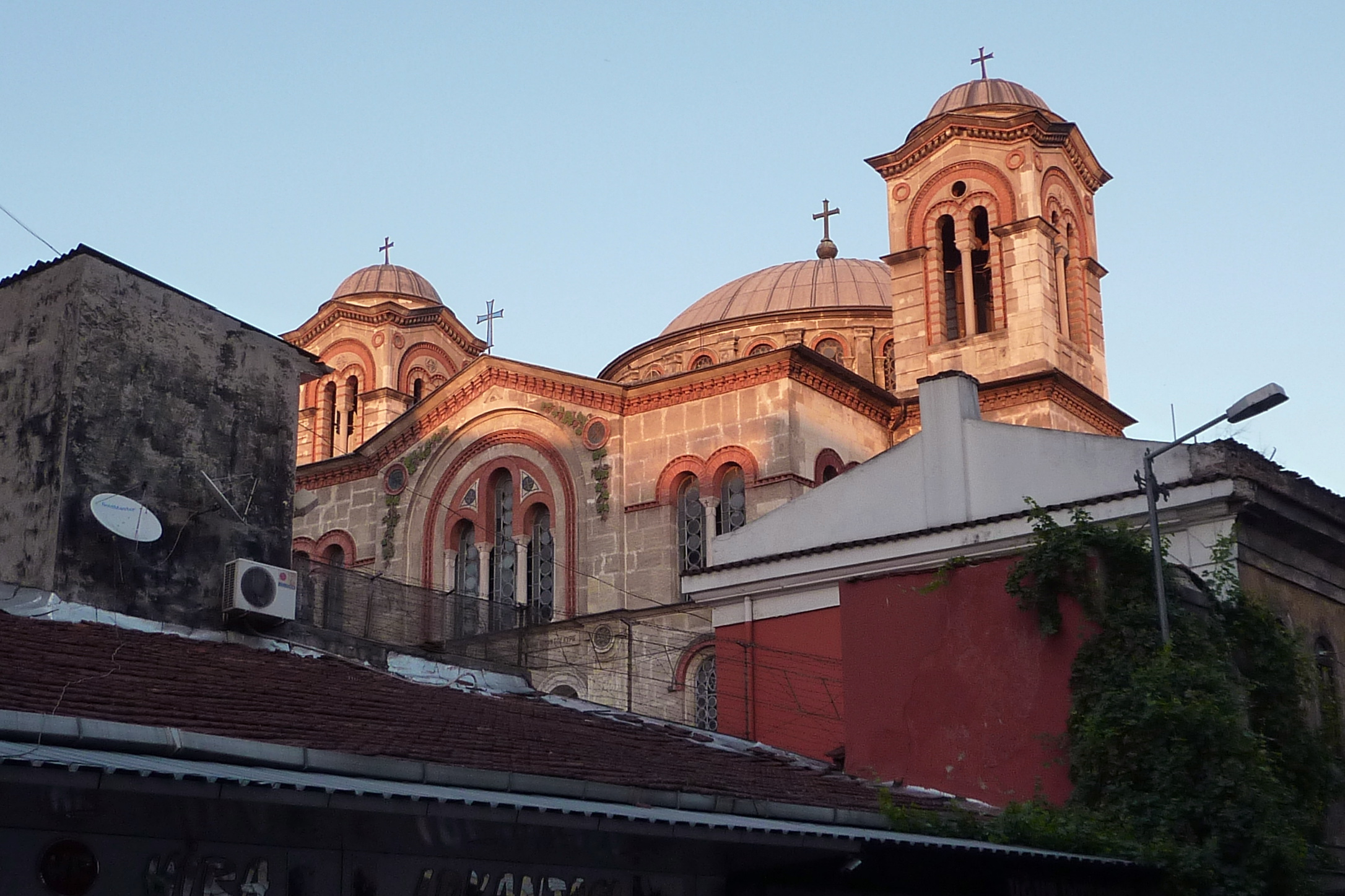
Hagia Kyriaki Church in Kumkapı, Istanbul (1895)

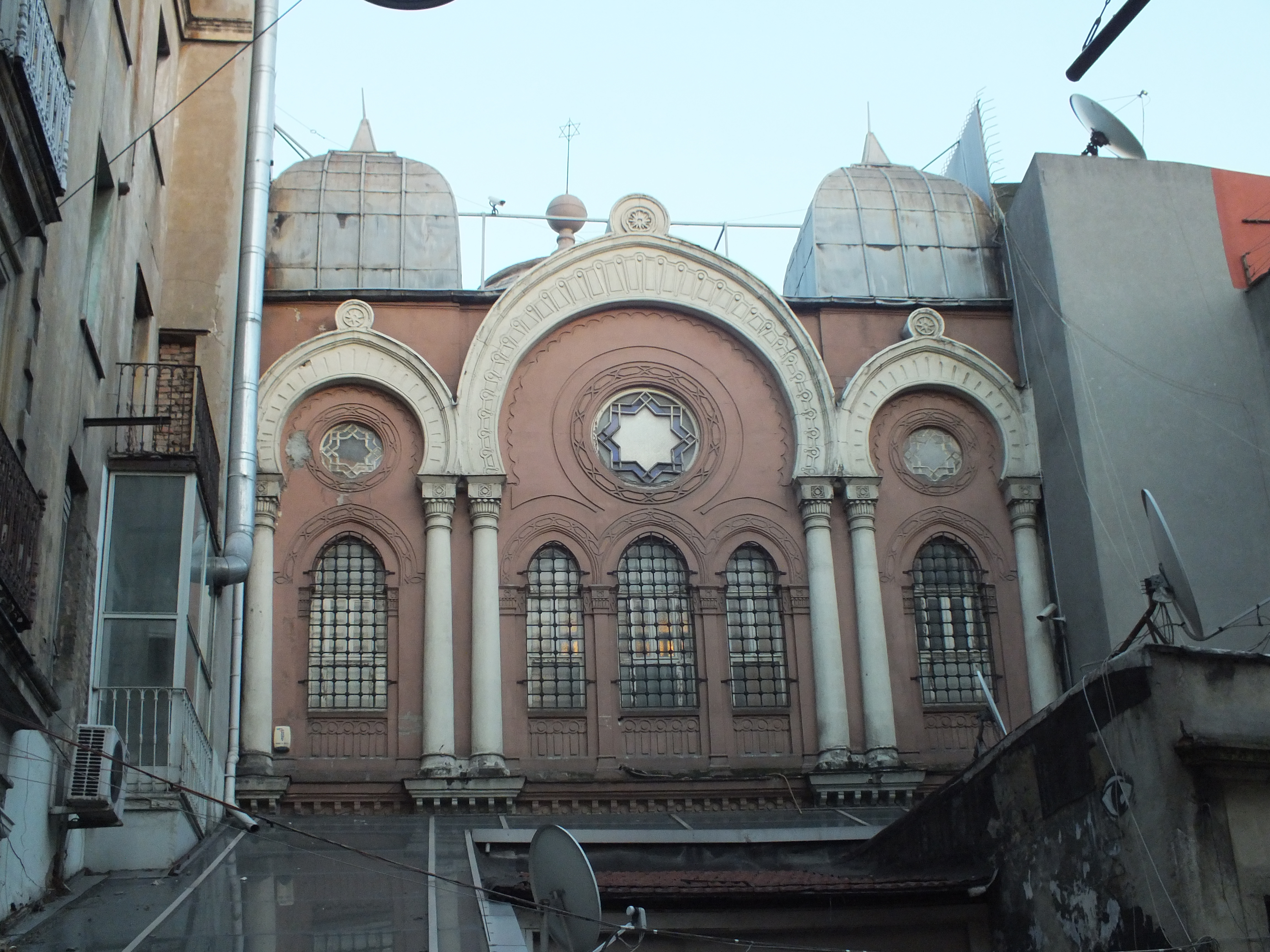
Ashkenazi Synagogue in Istanbul (1900)

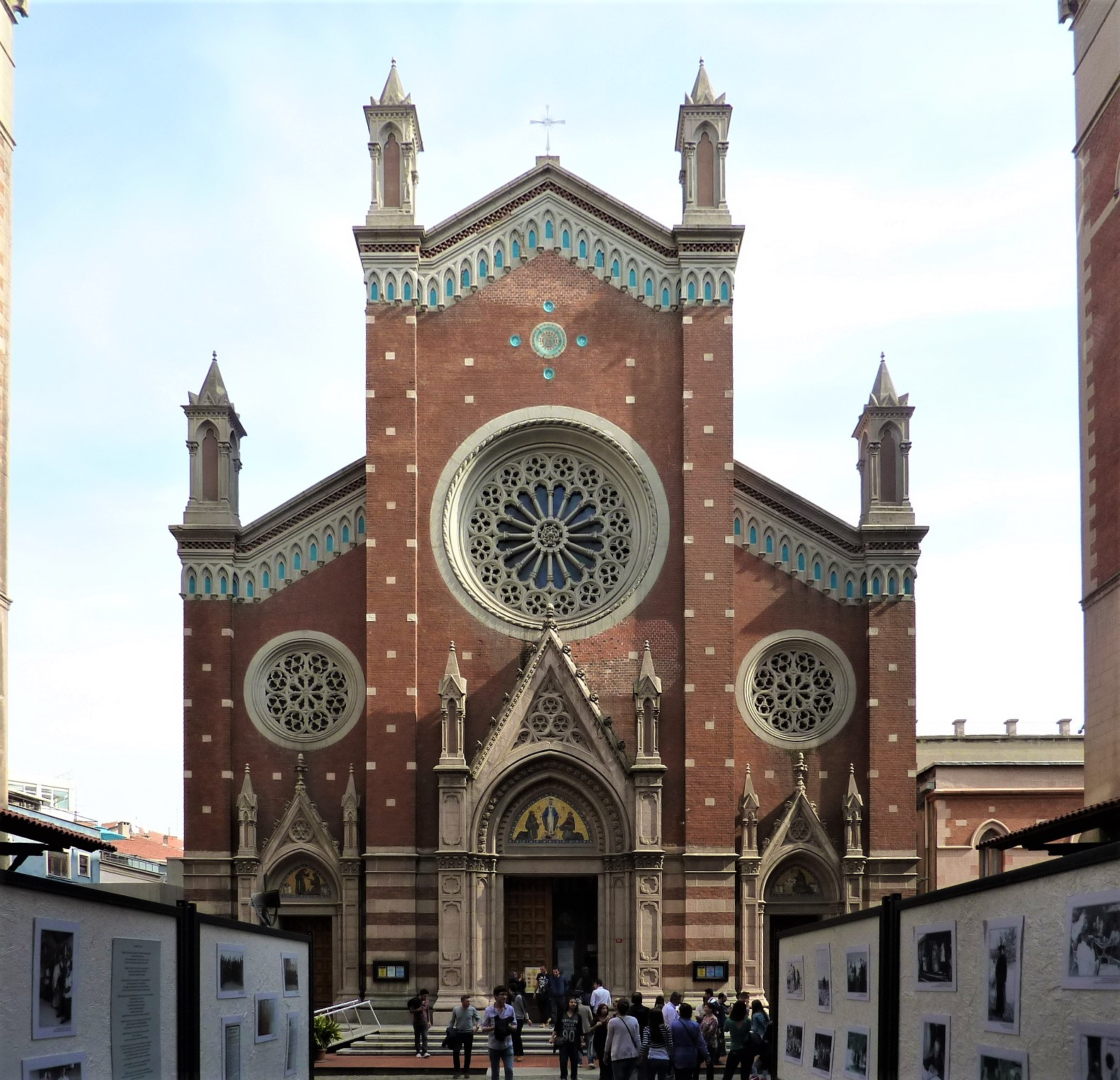
Church of St. Anthony in Beyoğlu, Istanbul (1906–1912)

=== Clock towers ===
Among the new types of monuments introduced to Ottoman architecture during this era, clock towers rose to prominence over the 19th century. One of the earliest towers, and the earliest Ottoman clock tower featuring a bell, was the clock tower built by Izzet Mehmed Pasha in Safranbolu in 1798. Sometime between 1835 and 1839 Mahmud II erected the oldest clock tower in Istanbul, the Tophane Clock Tower near the Nusretiye Mosque, which was rebuilt in more monumental form by Abdülmecid in 1848 or 1849. The largest and most impressive clock tower in Istanbul is the Dolmabahçe Clock Tower (near Dolmabahçe Palace), which was built by Abdülhamid II in 1890–1894. It mixes late Baroque decoration with the Neoclassical and eclectic style of the 19th century. Both these towers, along with the Yıldız Clock Tower (1890), Bursa Clock Tower (rebuilt in 1905), and many others, are designed with a multi-level appearance.

Other towers across the empire varied considerably in style. The Adana Clock Tower (1882), by contrast with the Istanbul examples, is a severe brick structure resembling the medieval Italian towers of San Gimignano. Other towers were built in a form resembling a minaret, such as the Çorum Clock Tower (1896). In 1901 Sultan Abdülhamid II (r. 1876–1909) encouraged the construction of clock towers across the empire for the celebration of the 25th anniversary of his accession to the throne. The Konak Clock Tower in Izmir is one example built that year. Eventually every sizeable Ottoman town was equipped with a clock tower.

Ottoman clock towers

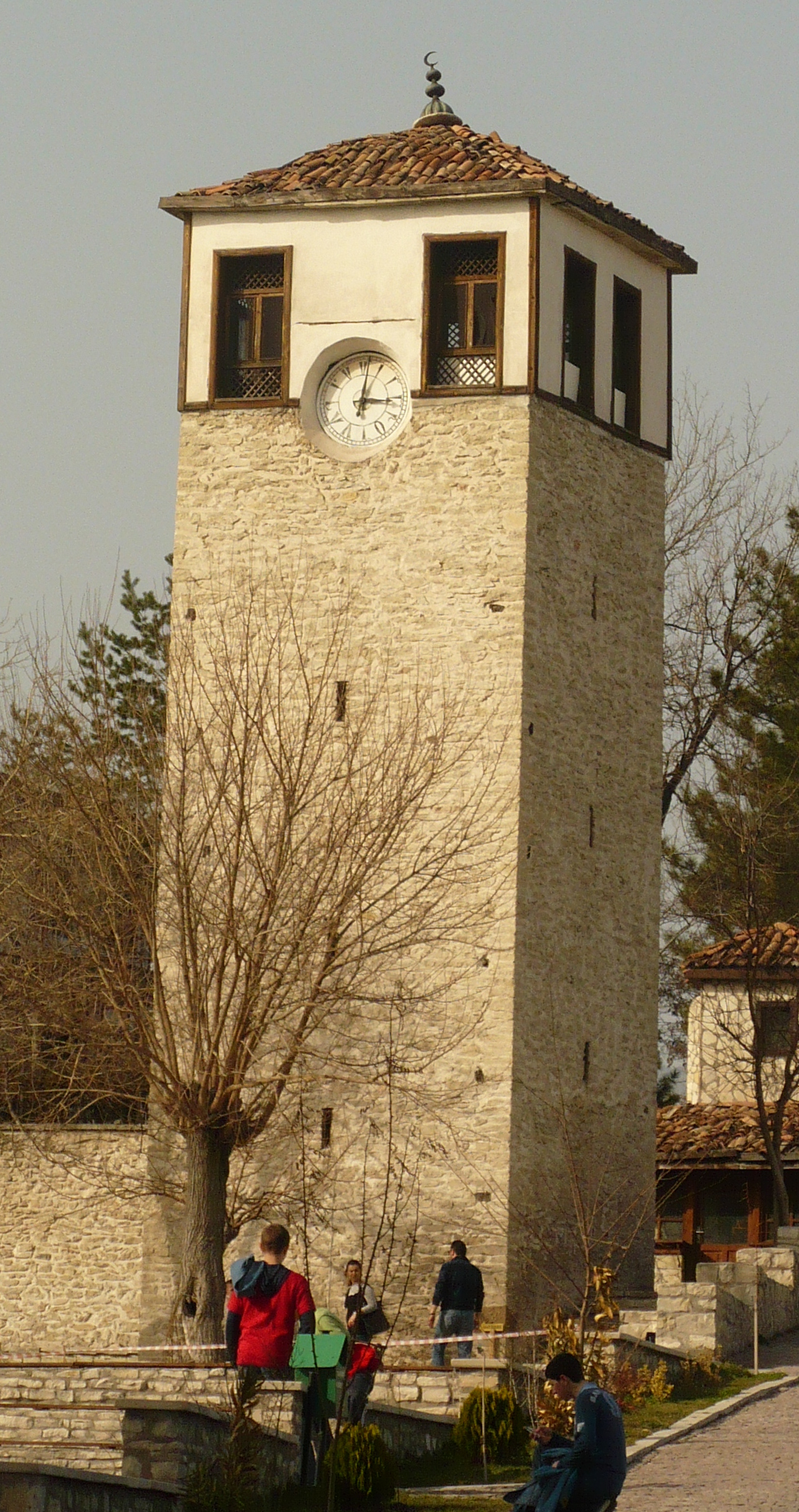
Safranbolu Clock Tower (1798)

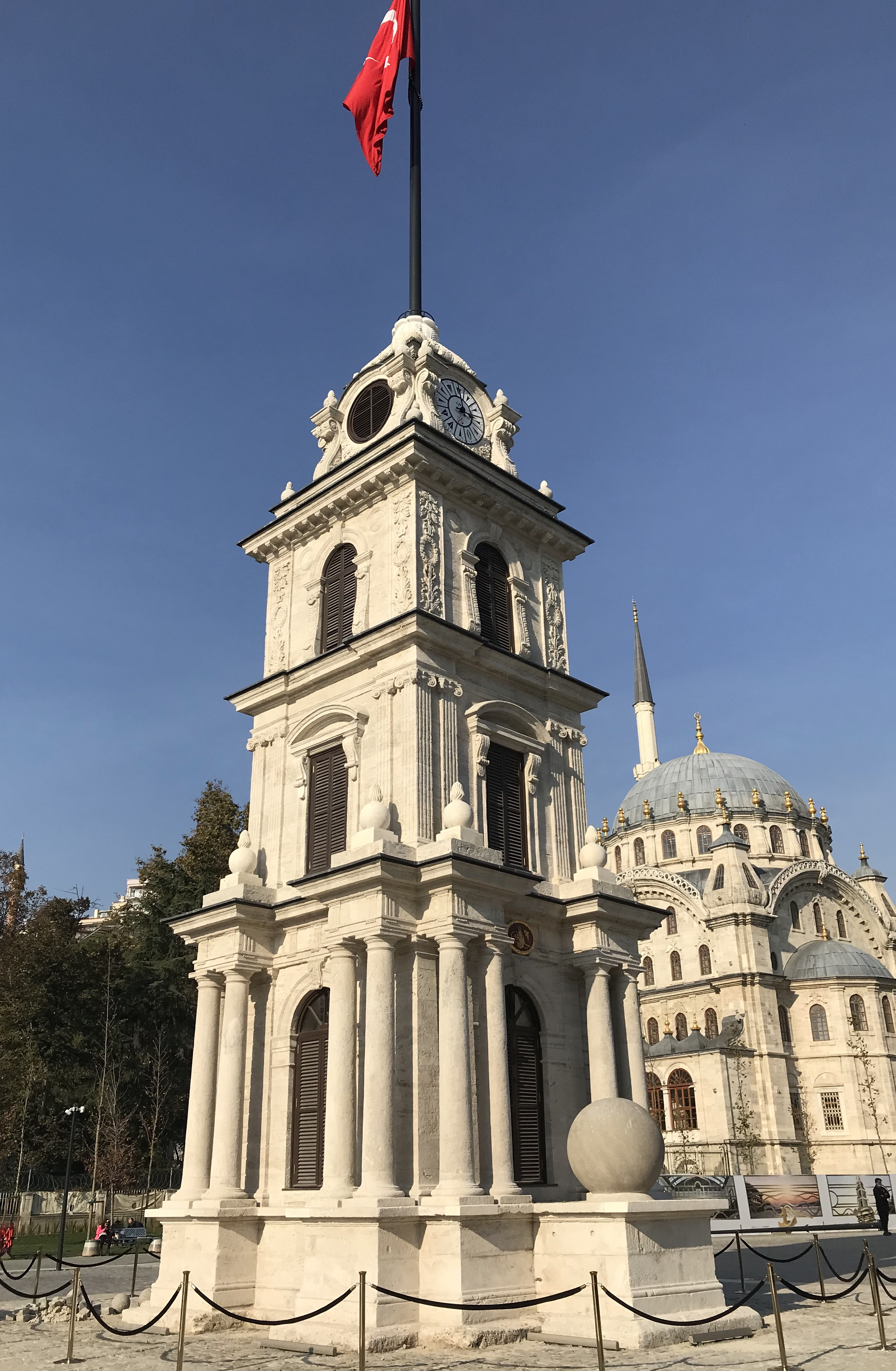
Tophane Clock Tower in Istanbul (circa 1848)

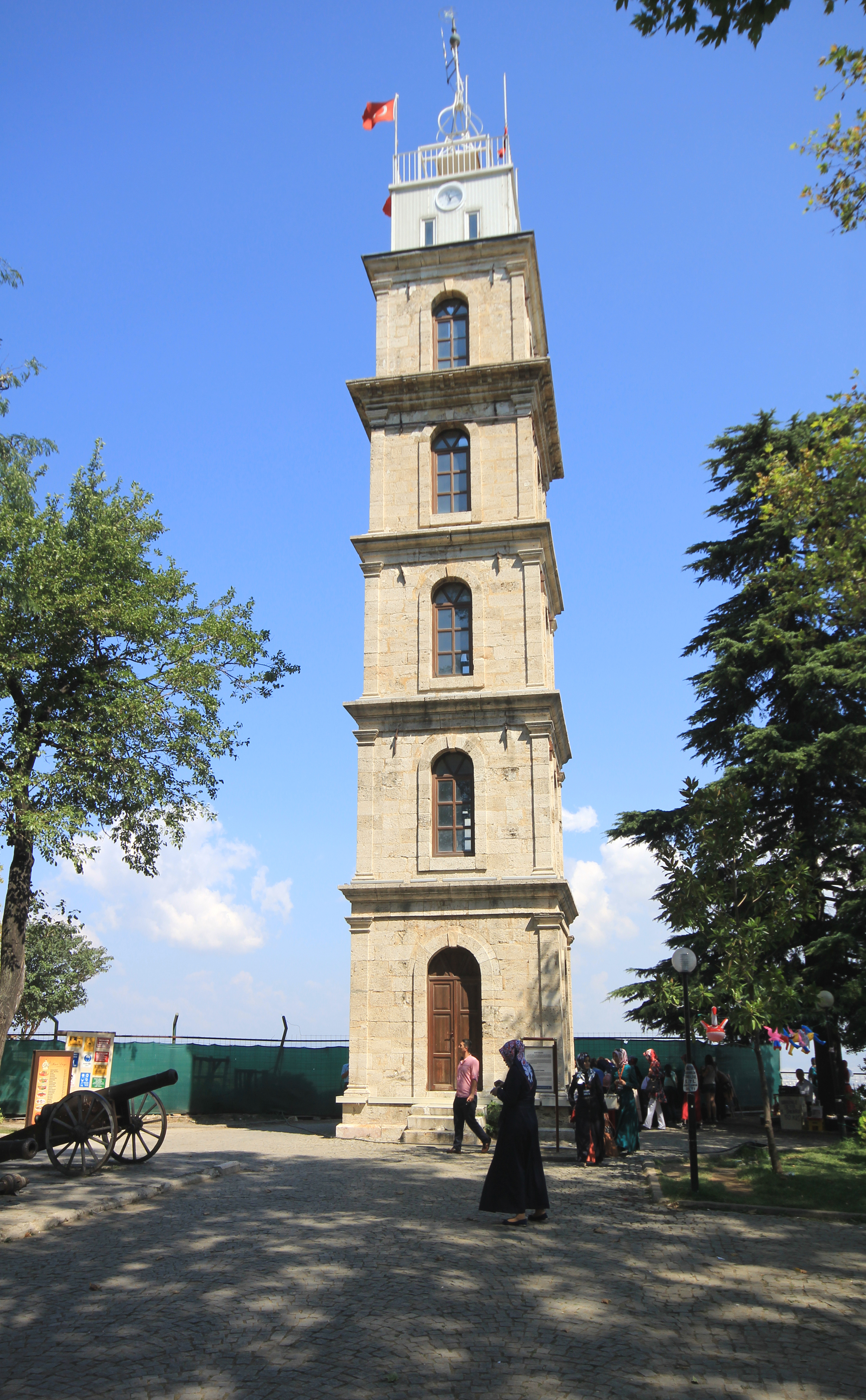
Clock tower in the Citadel of Bursa (first built by Sultan Abdülaziz but rebuilt in 1905)

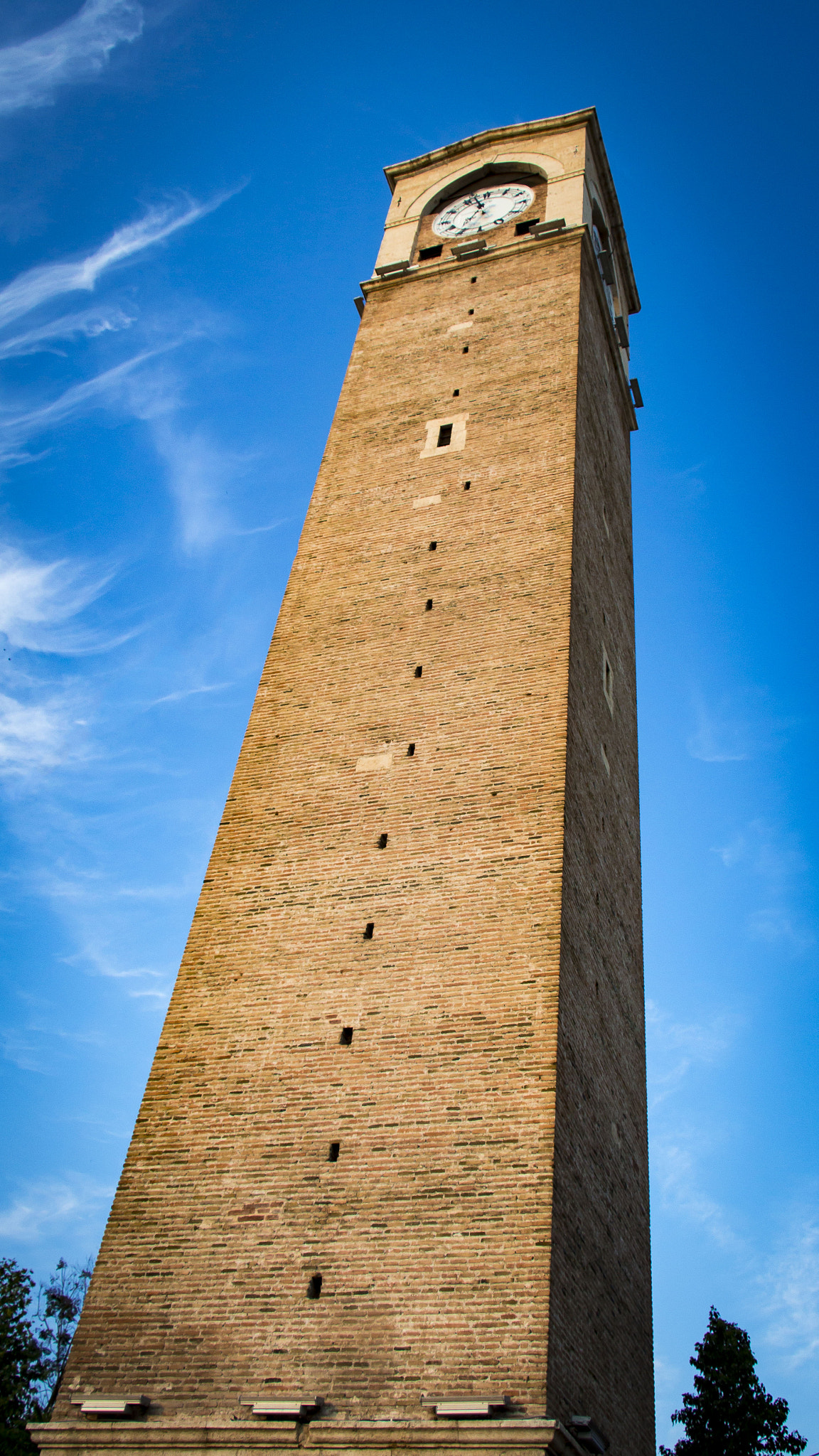
Adana Clock Tower or Büyük Saat (1882)

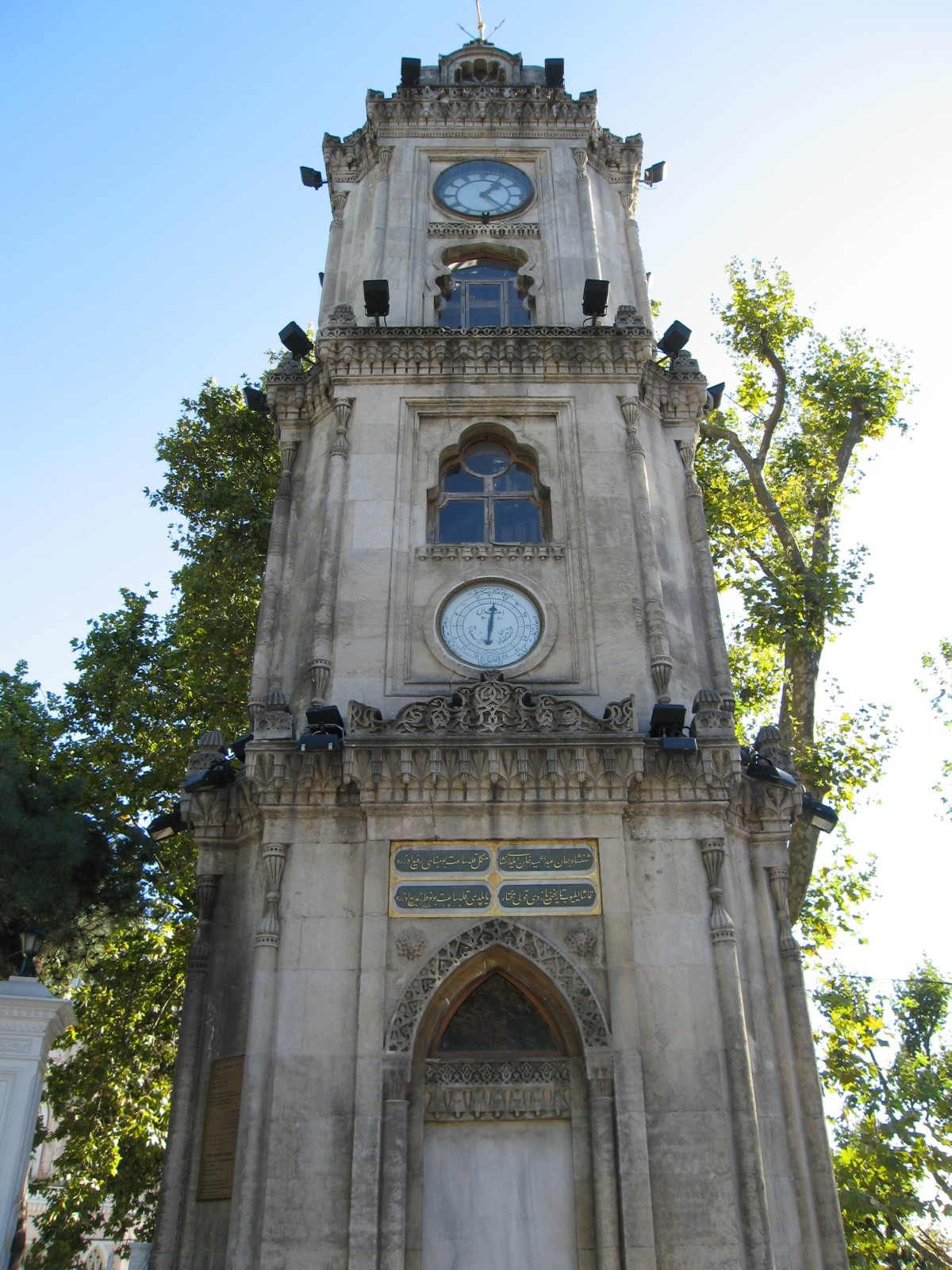
Yıldız Clock Tower inside Yıldız Palace (1890)

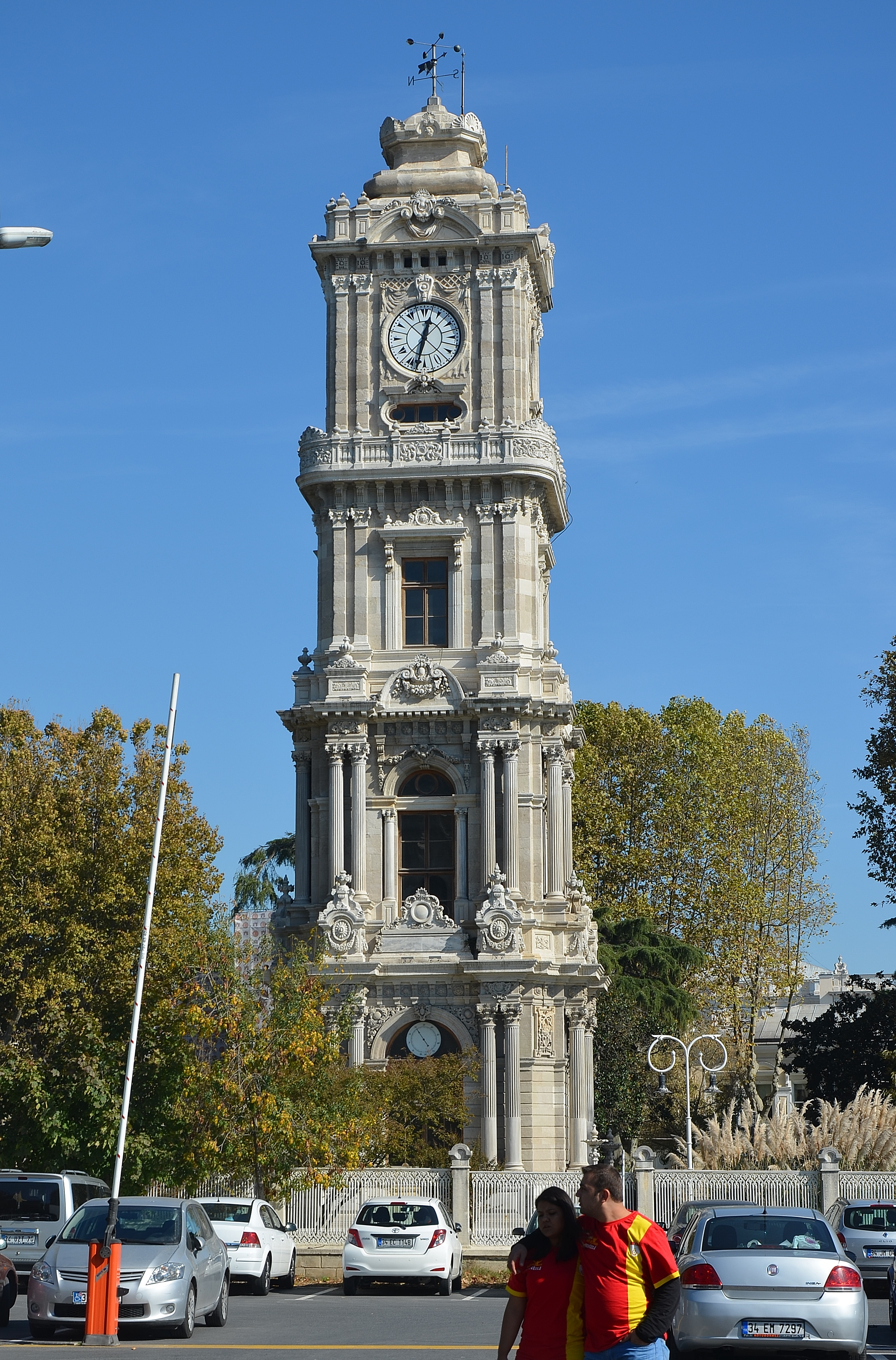
Dolmabahçe Clock Tower in Istanbul (1890–1894)

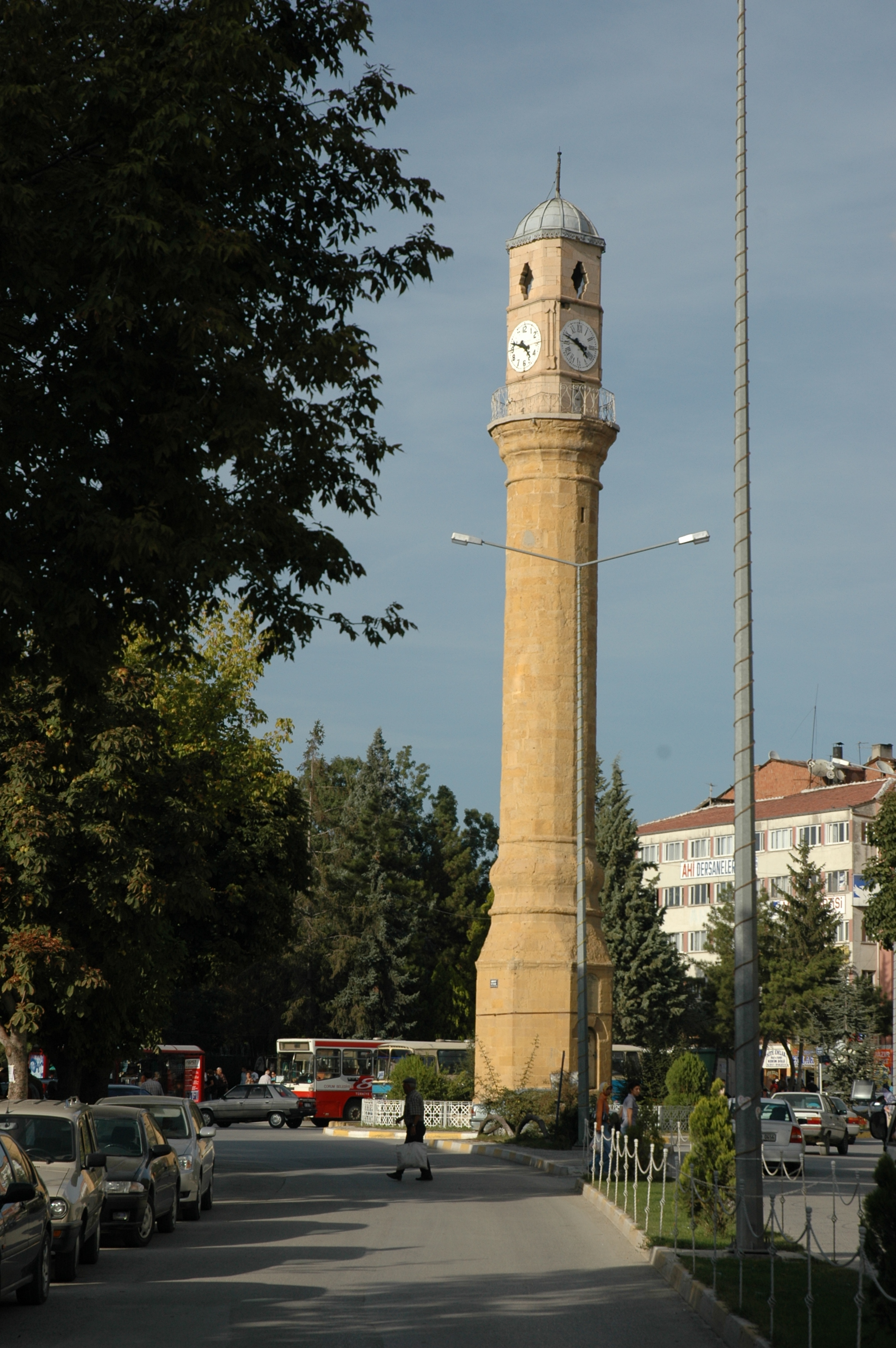
Çorum Clock Tower (1896)

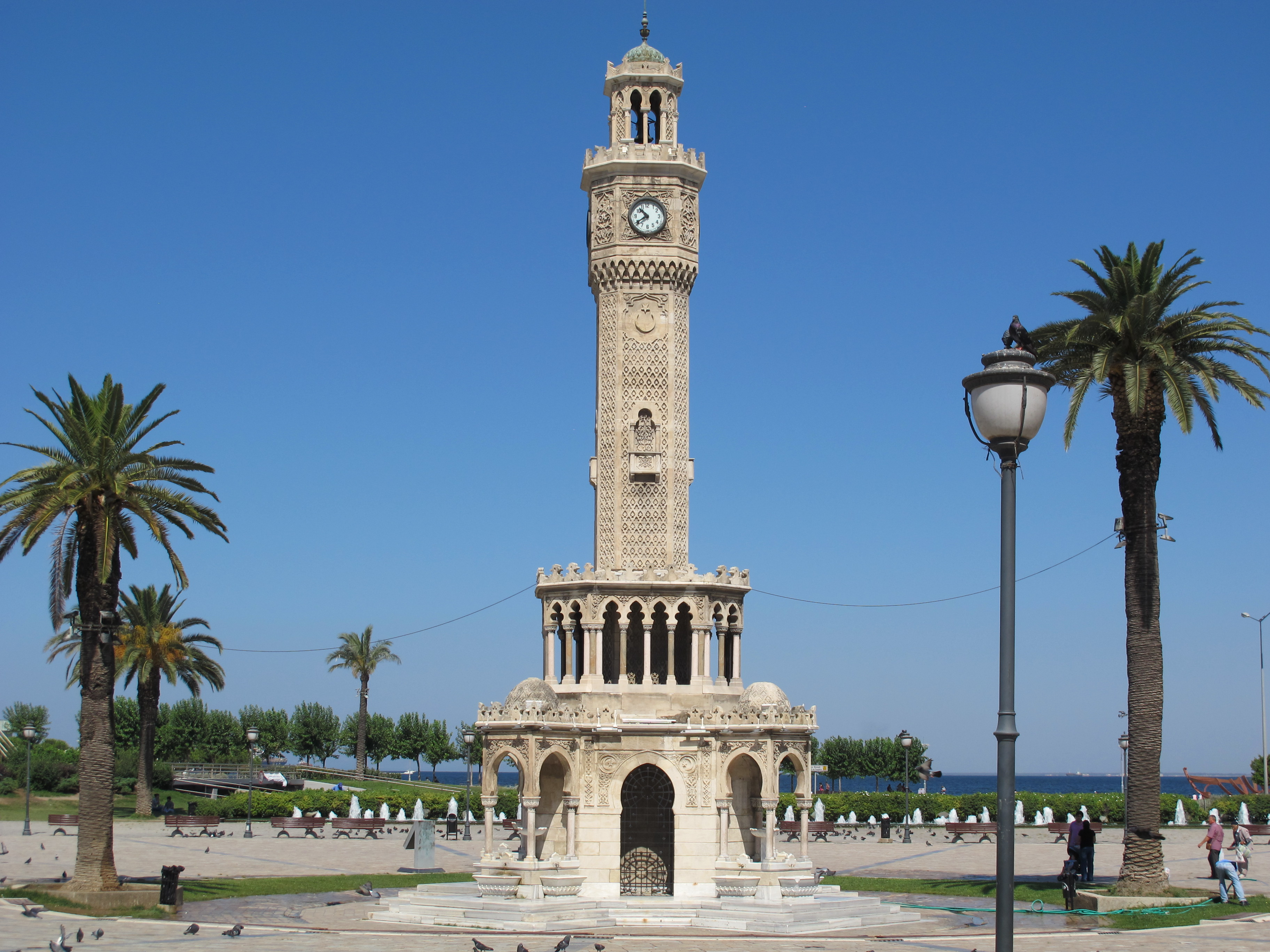
Konak Clock Tower in Izmir (1901)

=== Commercial buildings ===
In the Beyoğlu district of Istanbul, Parisian-style shopping arcades appeared in the 19th century. Some arcades consisted of a small courtyard filled with shops and surrounded by buildings, as with the example of the Hazzopulo Pasajı, begun in 1850 and completed in 1871. Others were simply built as a passage or alley (pasaj in Turkish) lined with shops. They were commonly built in a Neoclassical style with some European Baroque-style decoration, and were sometimes covered with a glass roof. One of the best-known examples is the Çiçek Pasajı ("Flower Passage") built in 1876 as part of a building called the Cité de Pera, which contained shops on the ground floor and luxury apartments above. Other well-known examples include the Avrupa Pasajı (1874), the Atlas Pasajı (1877), the Halep (Aleppo) Pasajı (1880–1885), and the Suriye Pasajı (1908).

Other commercial building types that appeared in the late 19th century included hotels, such as the Londra Hotel (1891) and Pera Palace Hotel designed by Alexandre Vallaury (1895), and banks, such as the Ottoman Bank building also designed by Vallaury (1890). These new buildings were also concentrated in the Beyoğlu district and many were again designed in a Neoclassical style, though eclecticism remained apparent in the details or interior decoration.

New commercial buildings

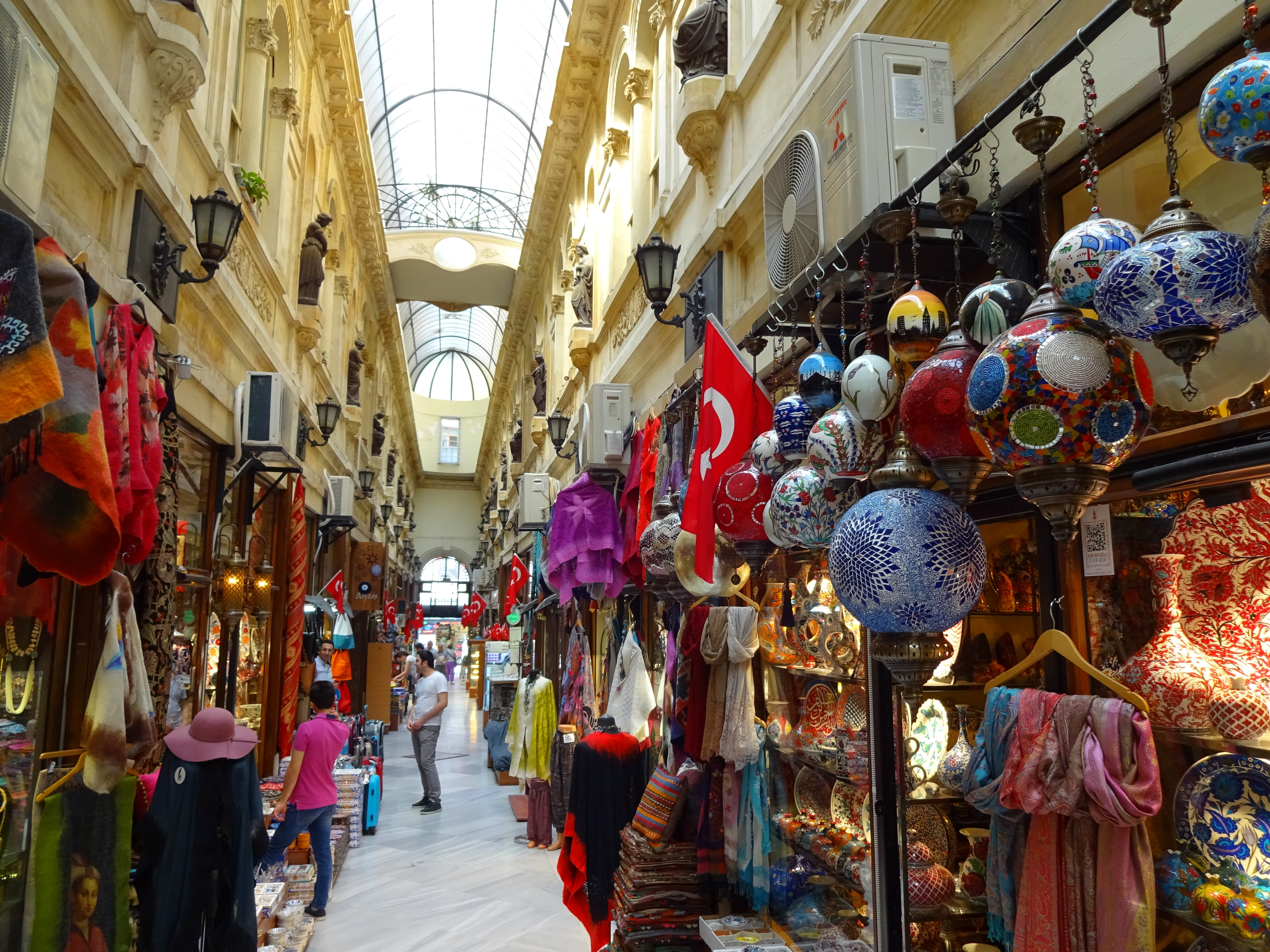
Shopping arcade of Avrupa Pasajı (1874)

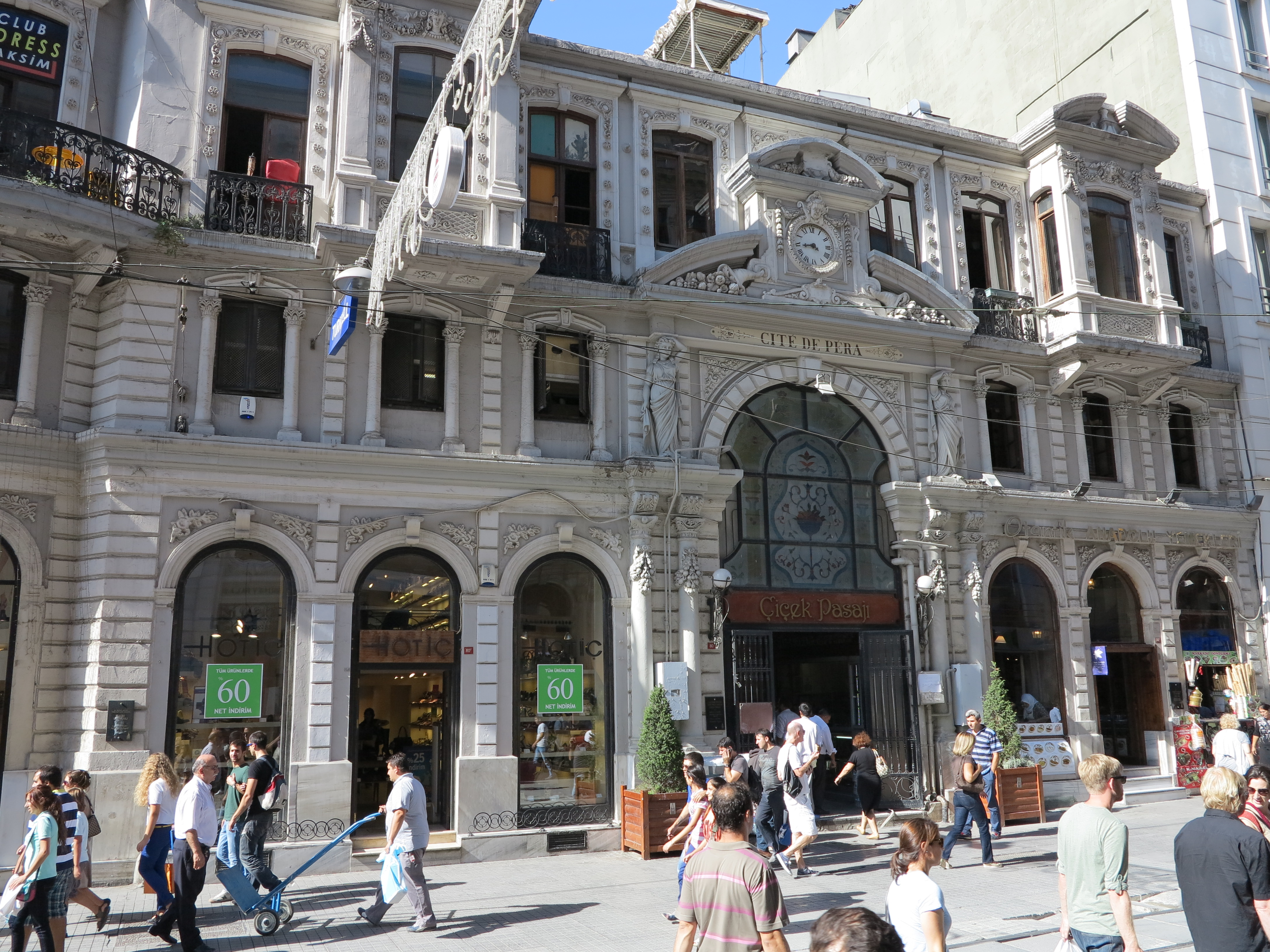
Cité de Pera building and entrance to the Çiçek Pasajı (1876)

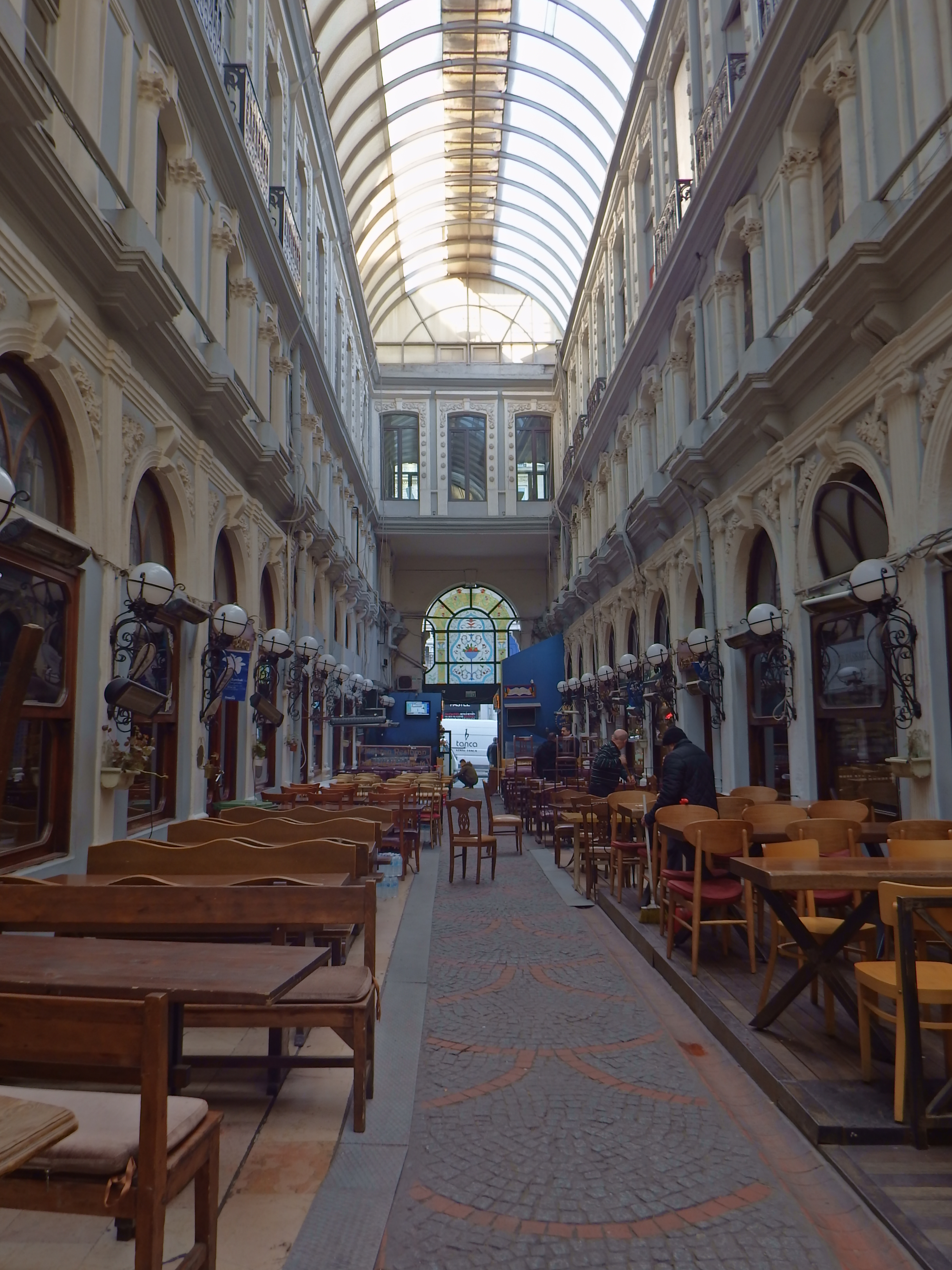
Çiçek Pasajı interior

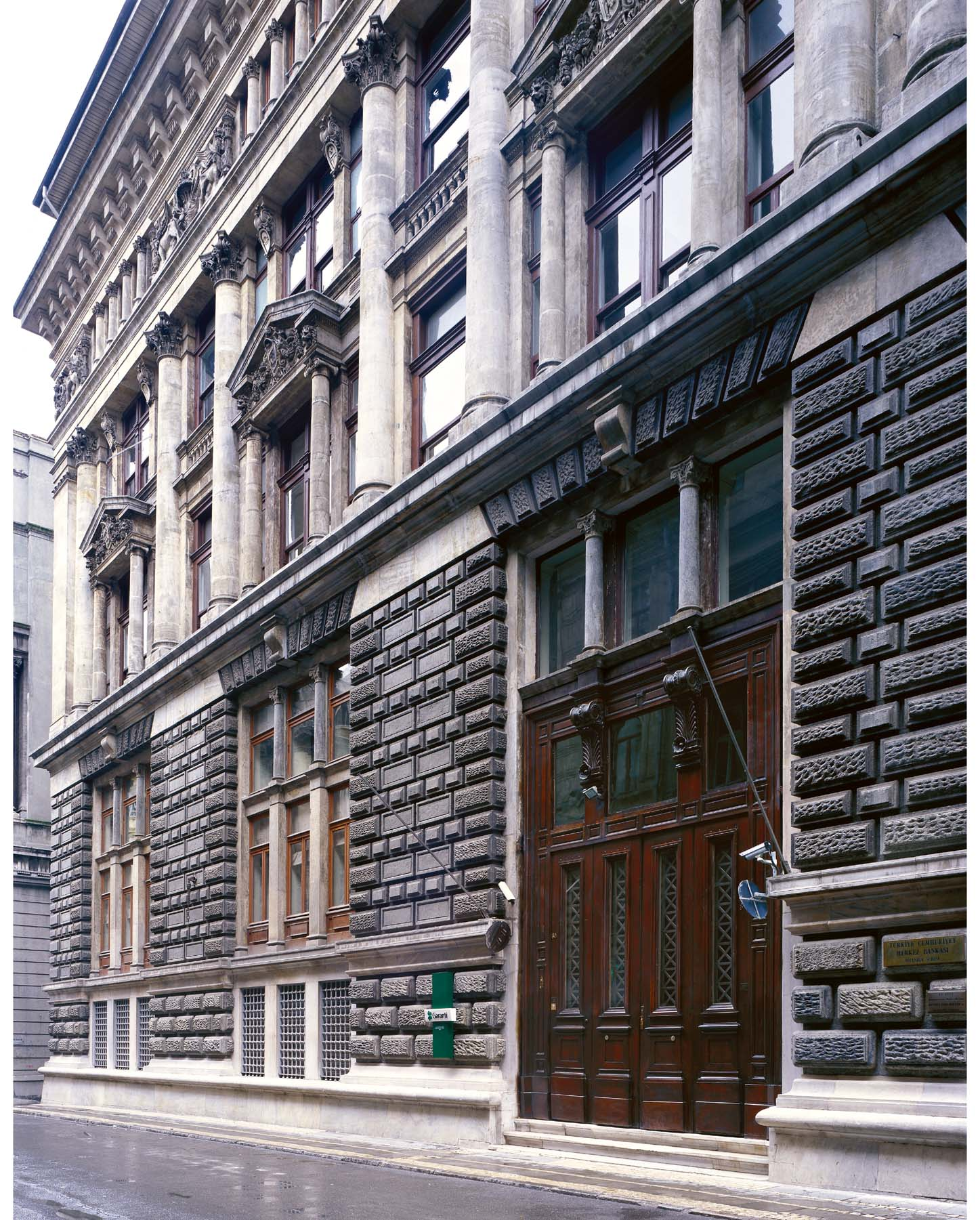
Ottoman Bank building in Galata, Istanbul (1890)

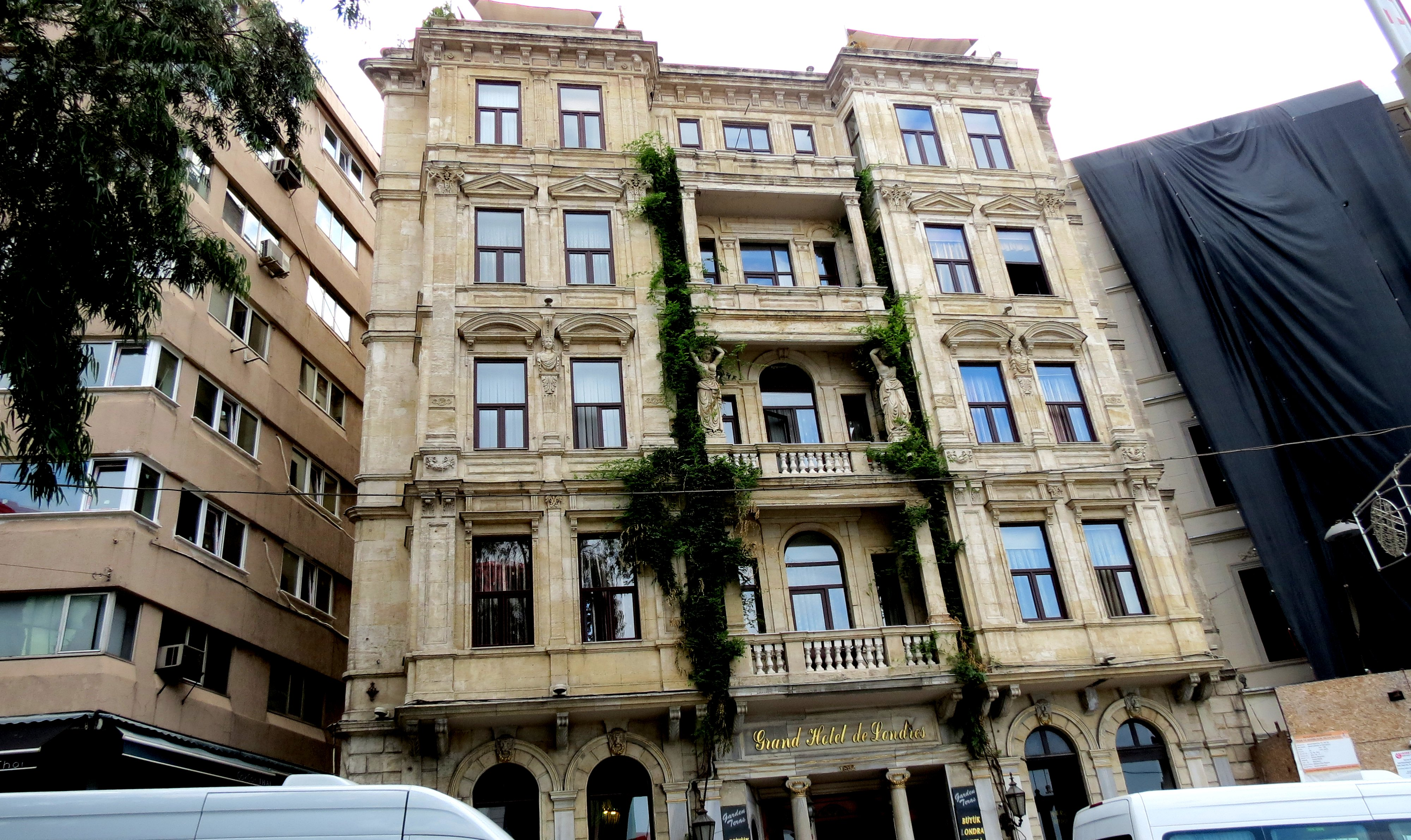
Londra Hotel in Istanbul (1891)

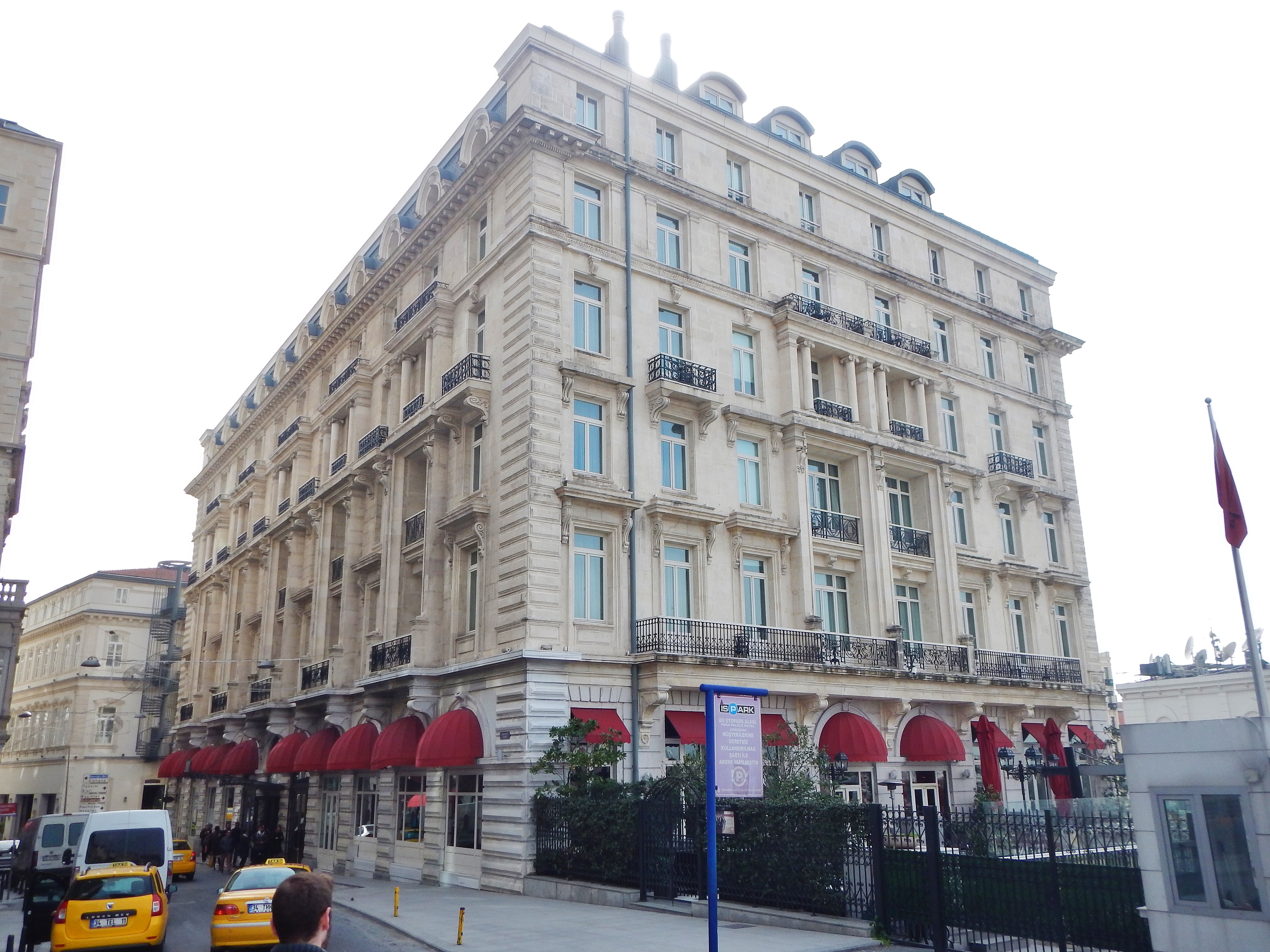
Pera Palace Hotel in Istanbul (1895)

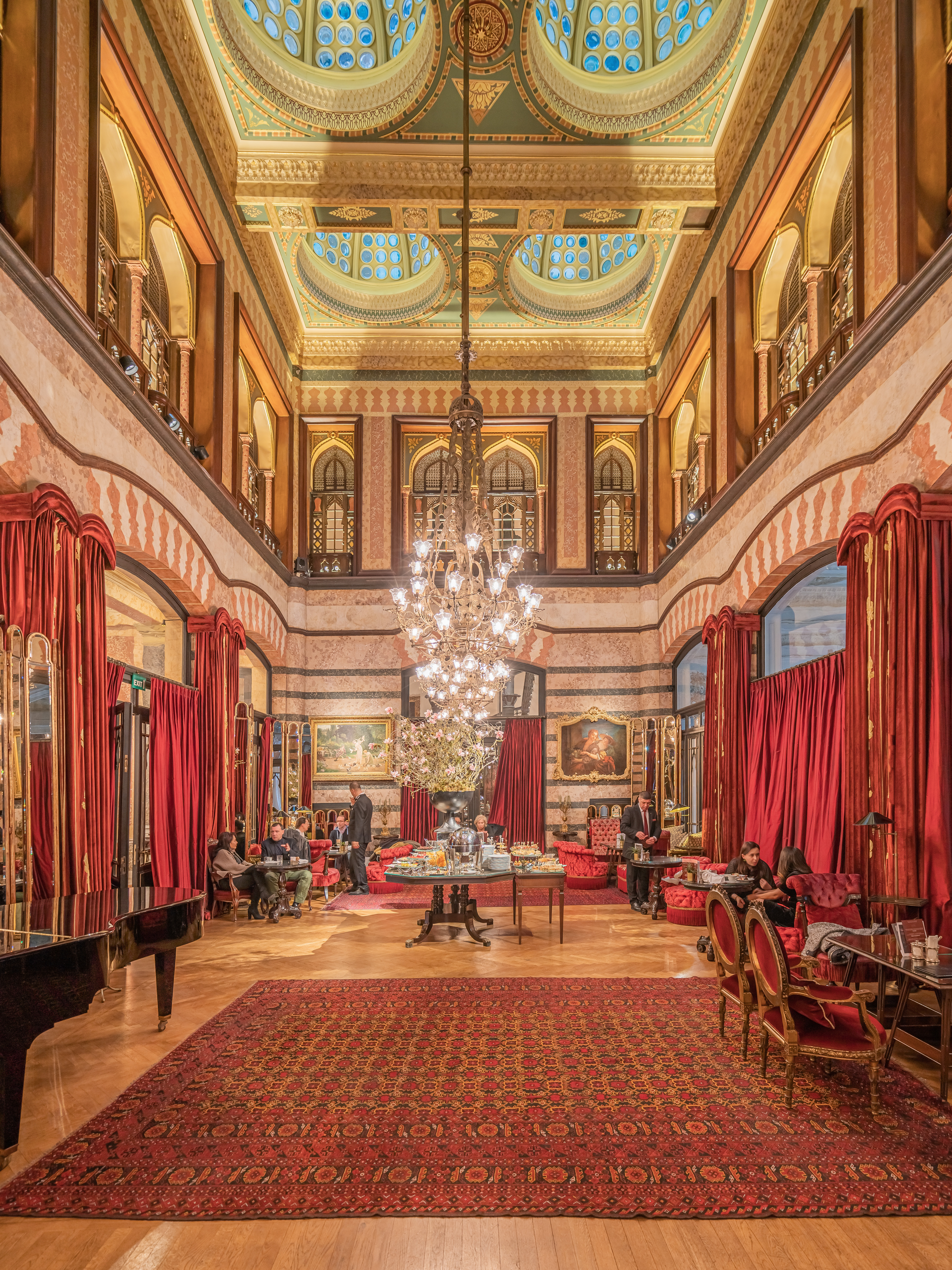
Pera Palace Hotel interior

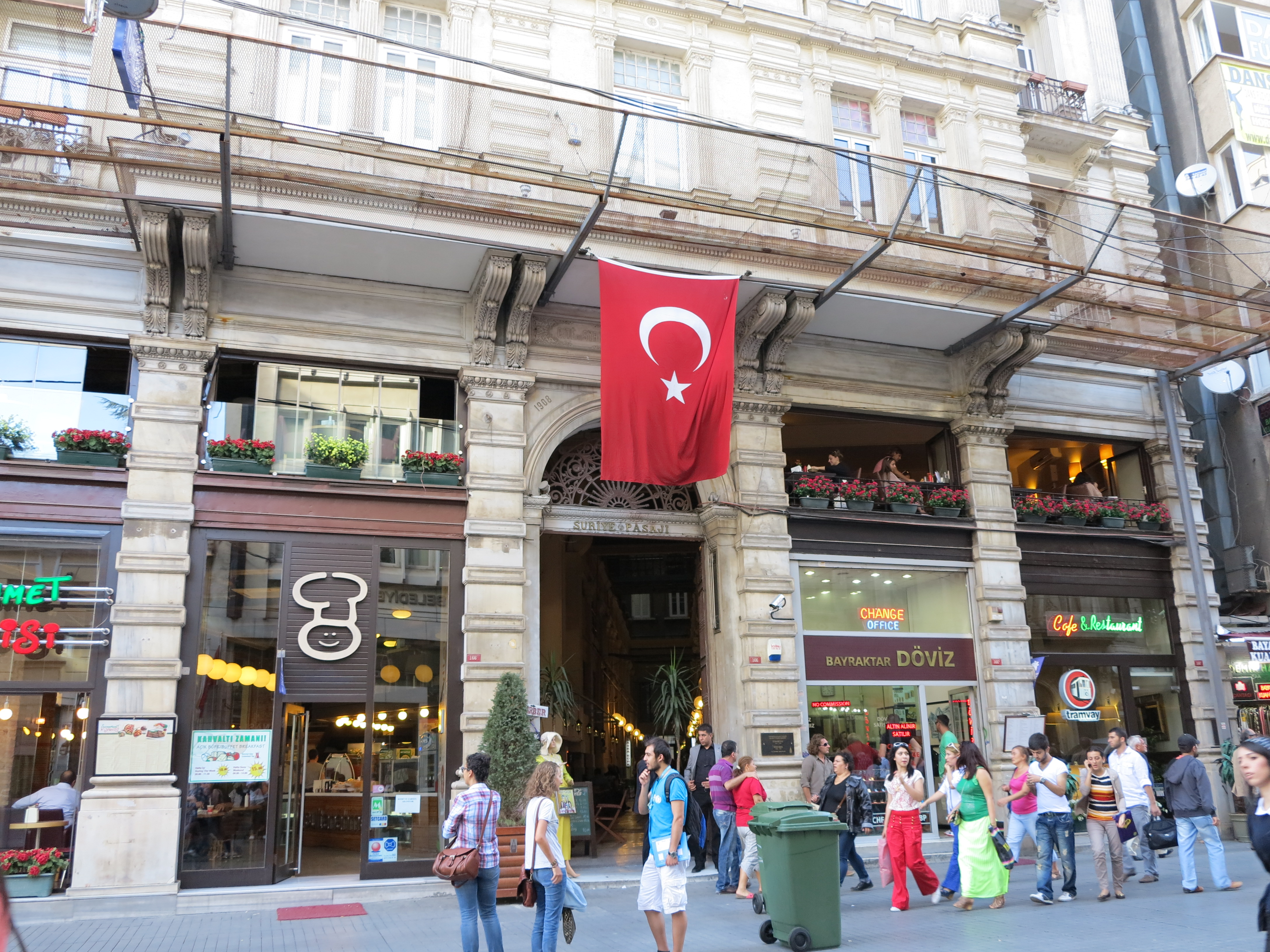
Entrance to the Suriye Pasajı (1908)

=== Railway stations ===
The construction of railway stations was a feature of Ottoman modernisation reflecting the new infrastructure changes within the empire. The most famous example is the Sirkeci Railway Station, built in 1888–1890 as the terminus of the Orient Express. It was designed in an Orientalist style by German architect August Jasmund (also spelled "Jachmund"). The other major railway station of the era was Haydarpaşa Station, first built in 1872 when the railway to Baghdad was completed. The original building was a mix of Neoclassical, Baroque, and Orientalist styles. It was rebuilt in its current form in 1906–1908 by German architects Otto Ritter and Helmet Cuno in a German neo-Renaissance style. Both Sirkeci and Haydarpaşa stations were designed with a U-shaped layout with platforms in the center.

Railway stations

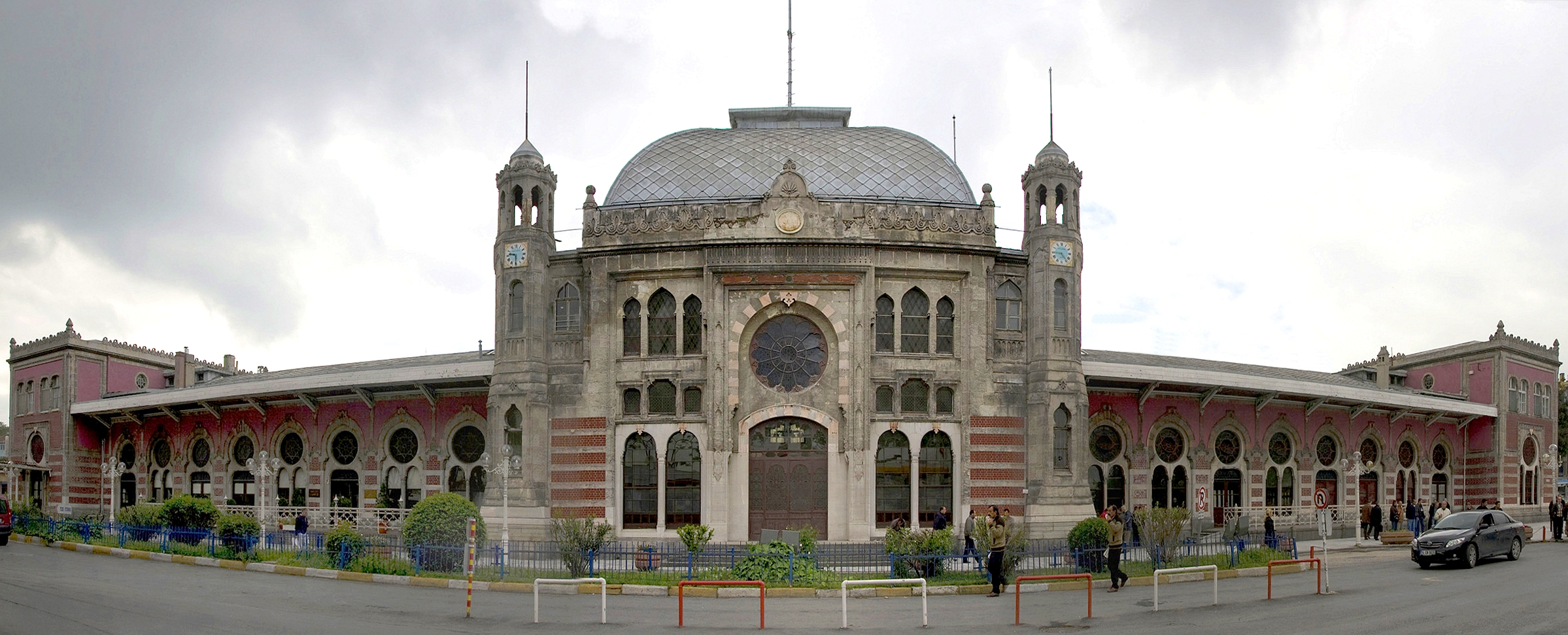
Exterior of the Sirkeci Railway Station in Istanbul (1888–1890), designed in Orientalist style

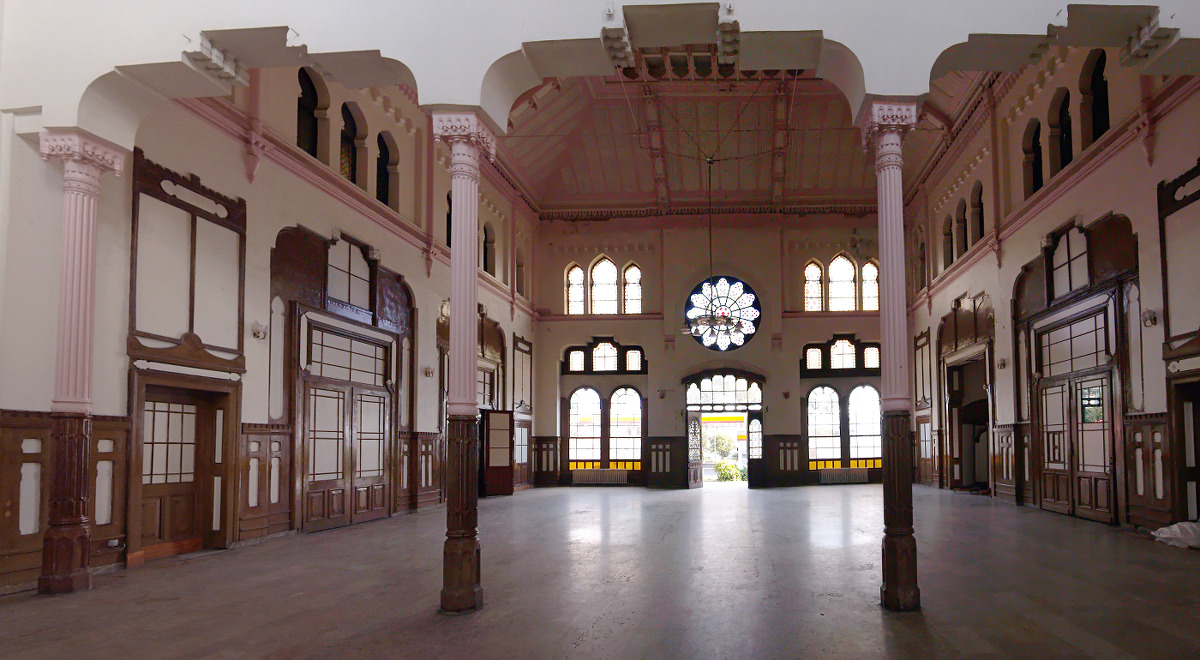
Interior hall in the Sirkeci Station

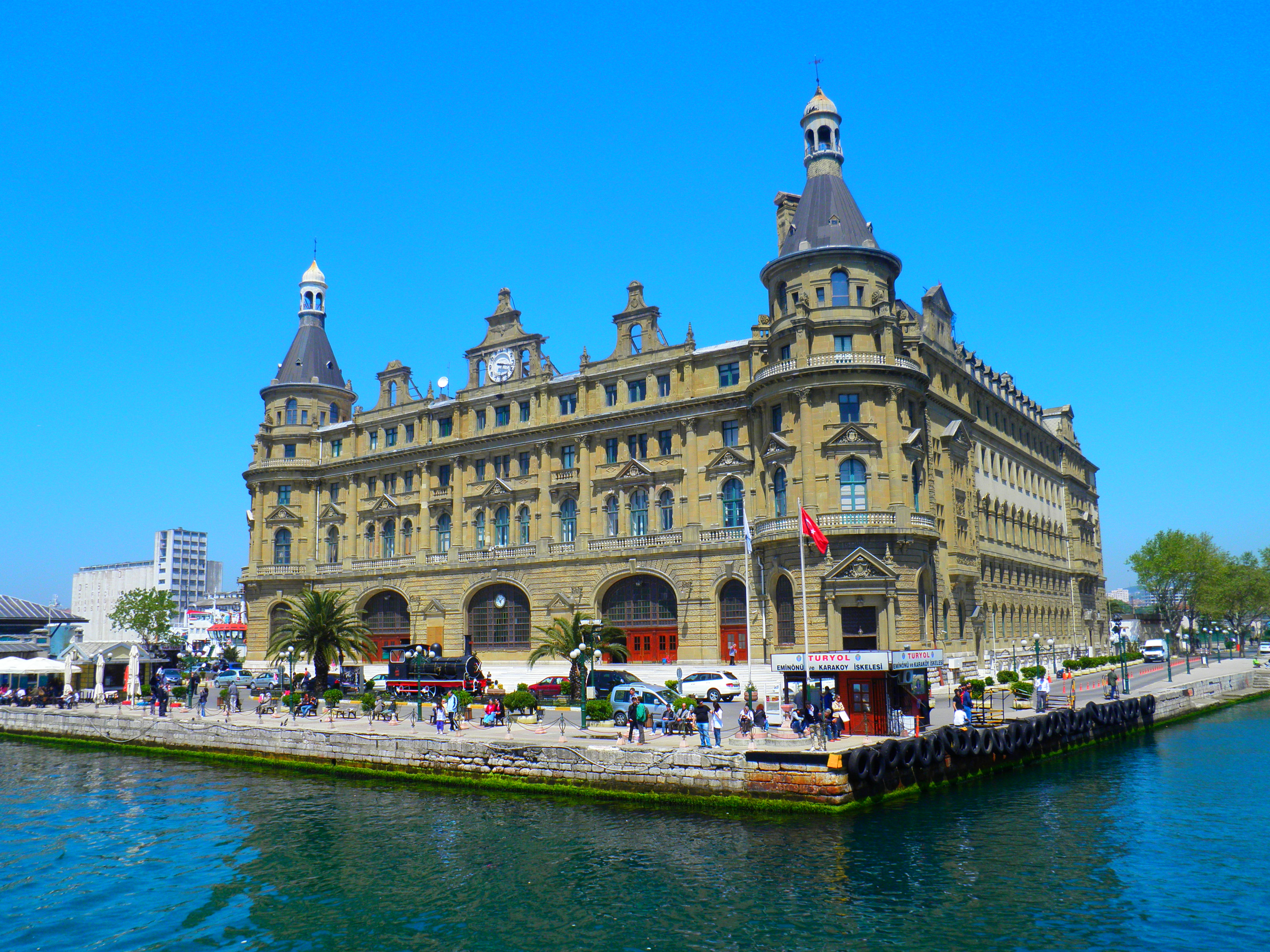
Haydarpaşa Station in Istanbul (rebuilt 1906–1908)

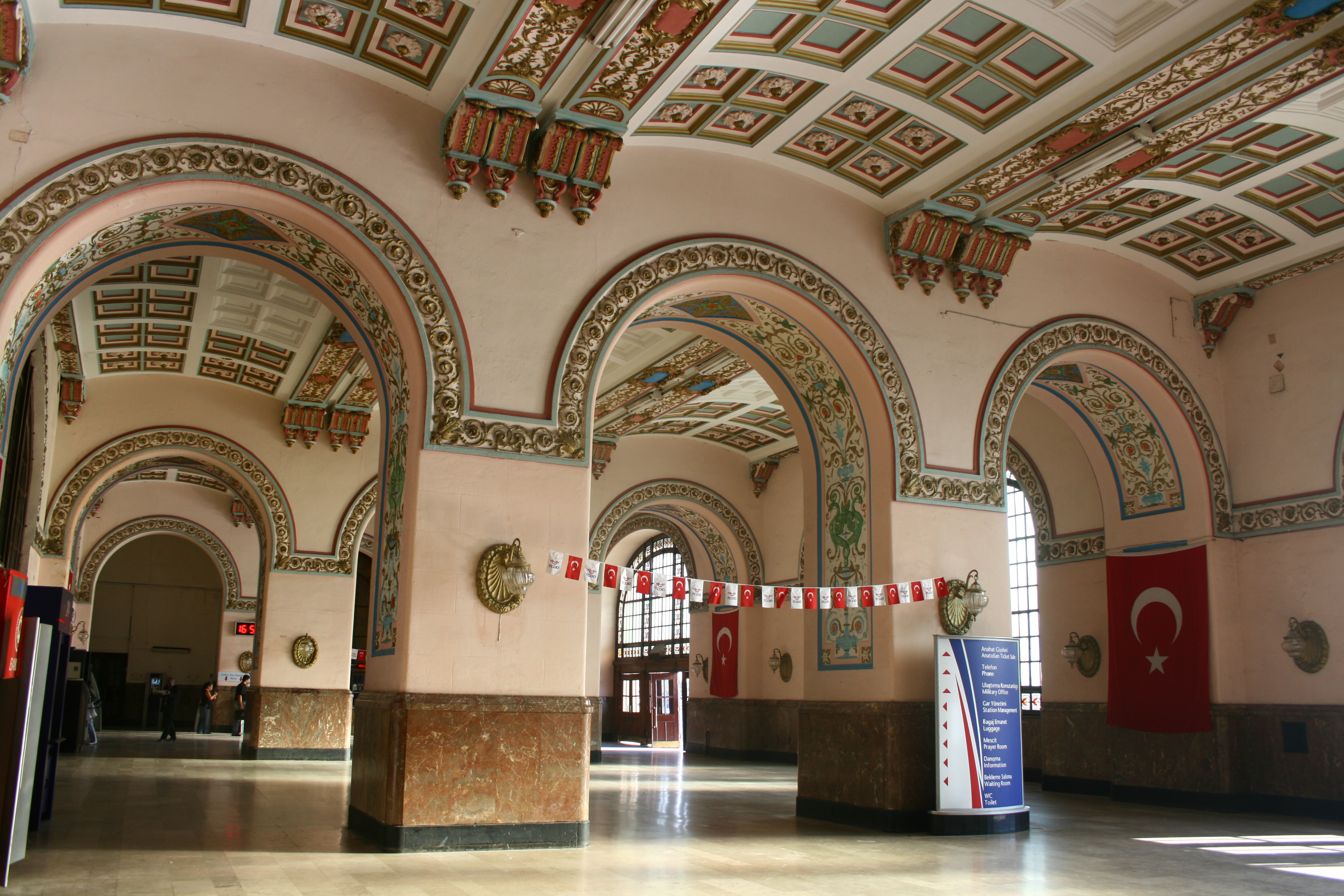
Interior hall of the Haydarpaşa Station

== Orientalism (late 19th century) ==
A local interpretation of Orientalist fashion steadily arose in the late 19th century, initially used by European architects such as Vallaury. This trend combined "neo-Ottoman" motifs with other motifs from wider Islamic architecture. The Sirkeci Railway Station (1888–1890), for example, was built in an Orientalist style, but its appearance makes more use of non-Ottoman Islamic architecture styles like Mamluk architecture than it does of Ottoman features. The iconic clock tower of Izmir (1901) was also built in a highly Orientalist style. Alexandre Vallaury, in collaboration with Raimondo D'Aronco, designed the neo-Ottoman-style Imperial School of Medicine in Üsküdar, built between 1893 and 1903. Another building with neo-Ottoman motifs by Vallaury is the Office of Public Debts (now serving as the Istanbul Erkek Lisesi), erected in Istanbul in 1897. The orientalist and Ottoman revivalist trends of this period, of which Vallaury was a major figure, eventually led to the First National Architecture movement which, alongside Art Nouveau, dominated architecture in the last years of the Ottoman Empire.

Neo-Ottoman buildings designed by Alexandre Vallaury

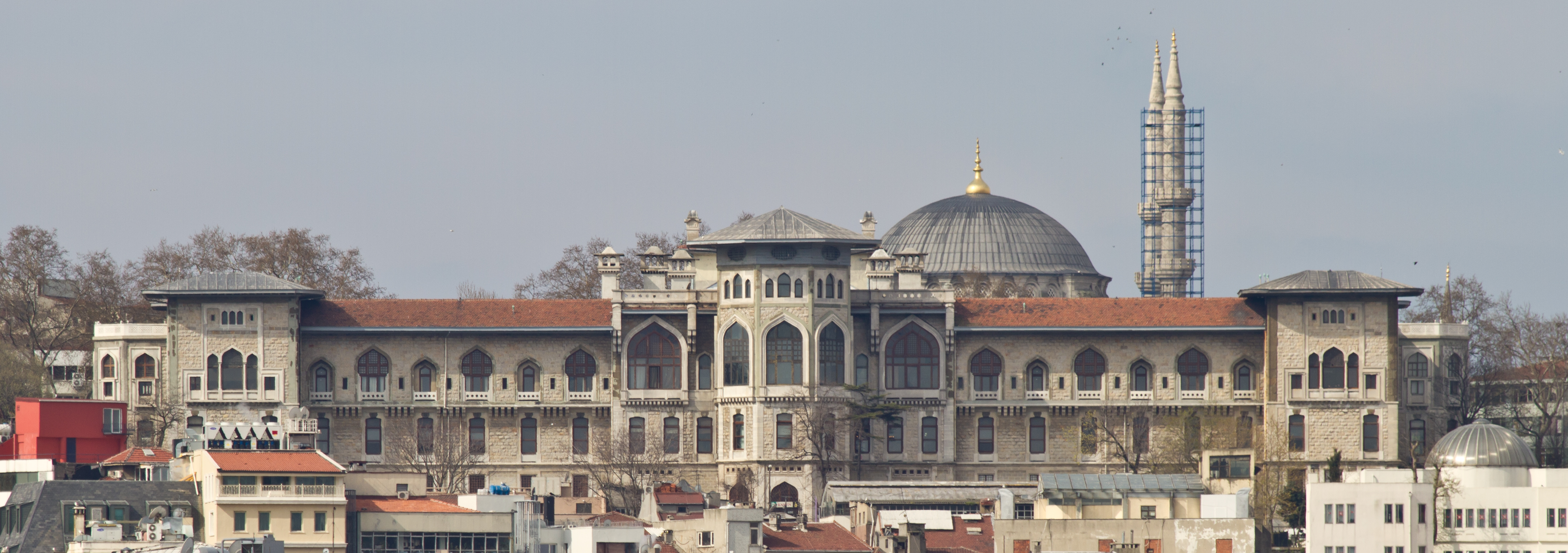
Ottoman Office of Public Debts (Istanbul Erkek Lisesi today), built in 1897

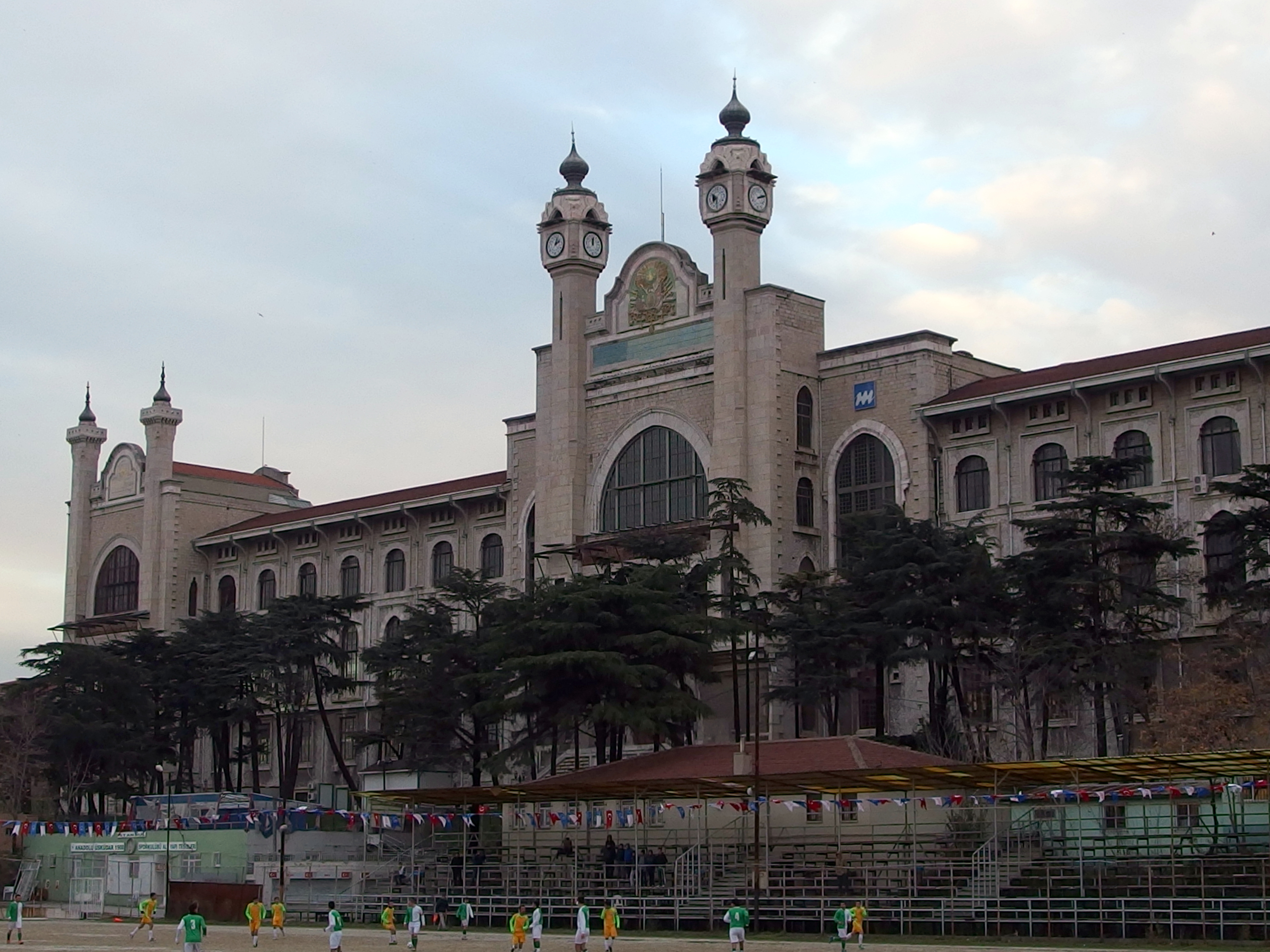
Imperial School of Medicine (1893–1903)

== Art Nouveau (late 19th century) ==
The eclecticism and European imports of the 19th century eventually led to the introduction of Art Nouveau, especially after the arrival of Raimondo D'Aronco in the late 19th century. D'Aronco came at the invitation of Sultan Abdülhamid II and served as chief court architect between 1896 and 1909. Istanbul became a new center of Art Nouveau and a local flavour of the style developed. The new style was most prevalent in the new apartment buildings being built in Istanbul at the time. The Camondo Stairs in Galata, donated to the city by a local Jewish family in 1860, are an early Art Nouveau example. The Botter Apartment building (1900–1901) on Istiklal Street and the Tomb of Sheikh Zafir in Yıldız (1905–1906) are among the most notable examples designed by D'Aronco, in addition to some of his buildings in the Yıldız Palace.

Art Nouveau decoration was applied to a wide variety of materials including stone, wood, stucco, and iron. Reflecting the continued eclecticism of the 19th century, they were also mixed with other styles such as neo-Baroque, neo-Ottoman, and Empire, such that Art Nouveau buildings were not always distinguishable from other genres. For example, the Hamidiye Fountain (1896–1901), originally erected in Tophane but later moved to Maçka Park, is a more eclectic work designed by D'Aronco.

Art Nouveau in Istanbul

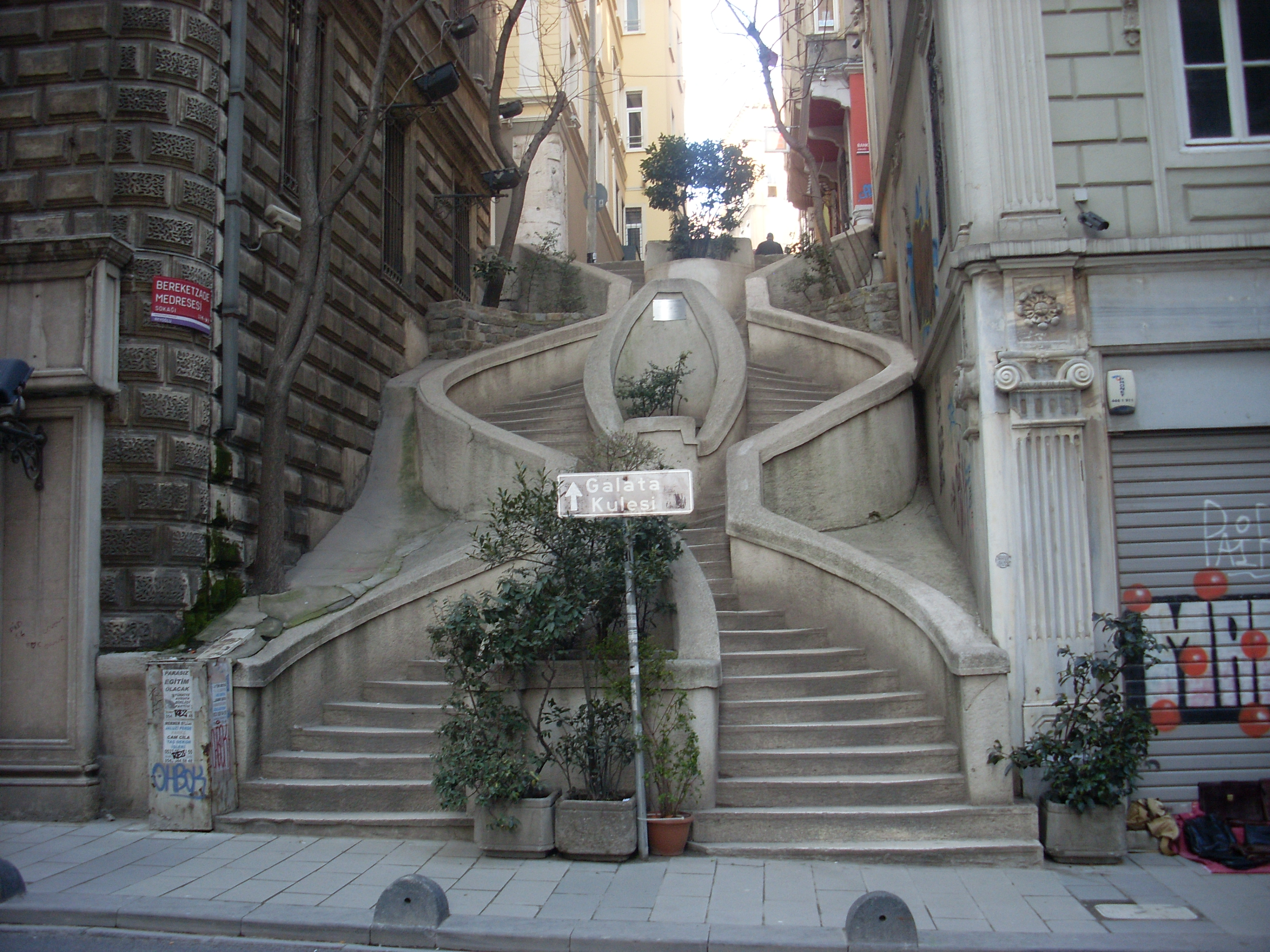
Camondo Stairs in Galata (circa 1860)

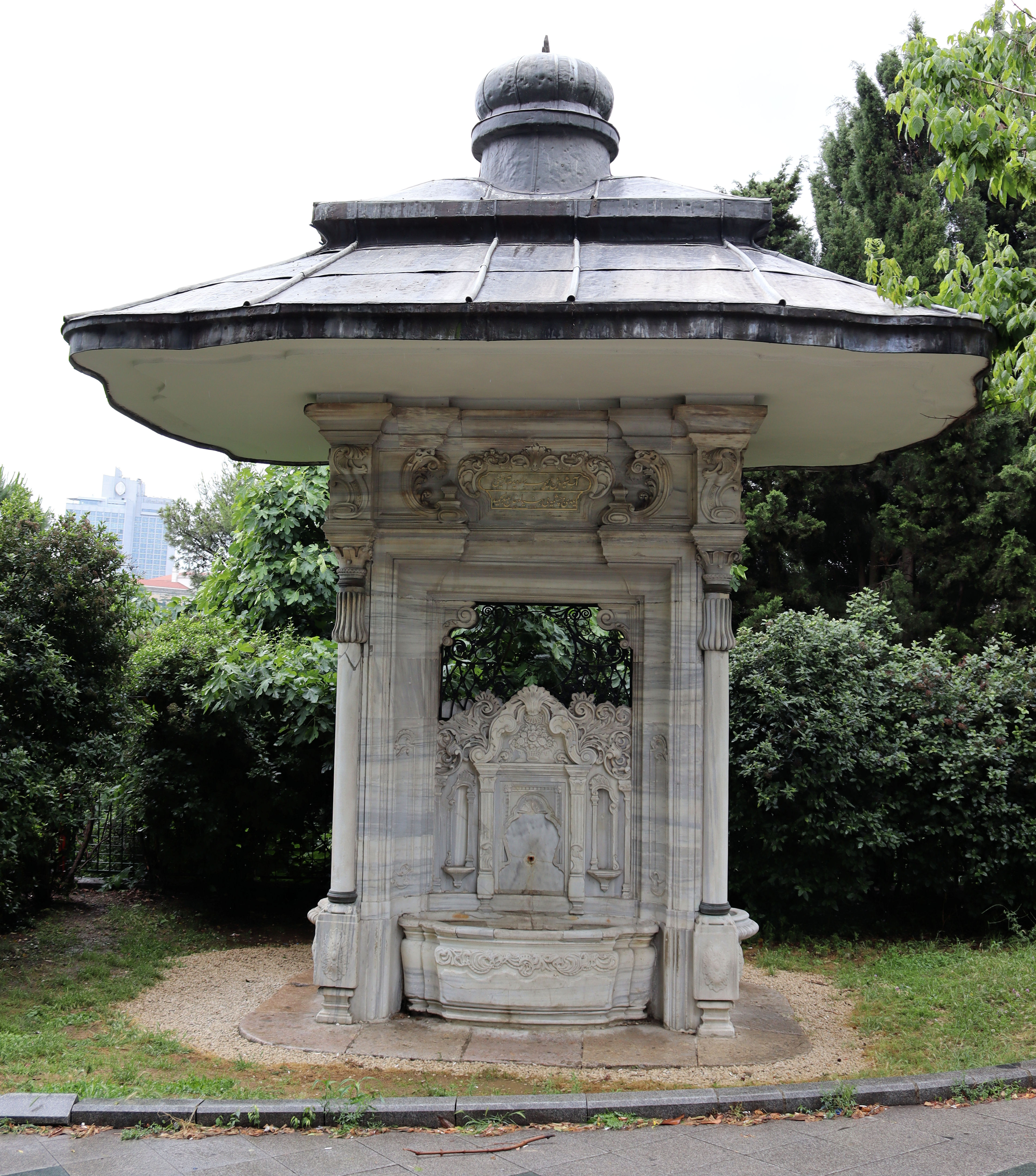
Fountain of Abdülhamid II (1896–1901), located today in Maçka Park

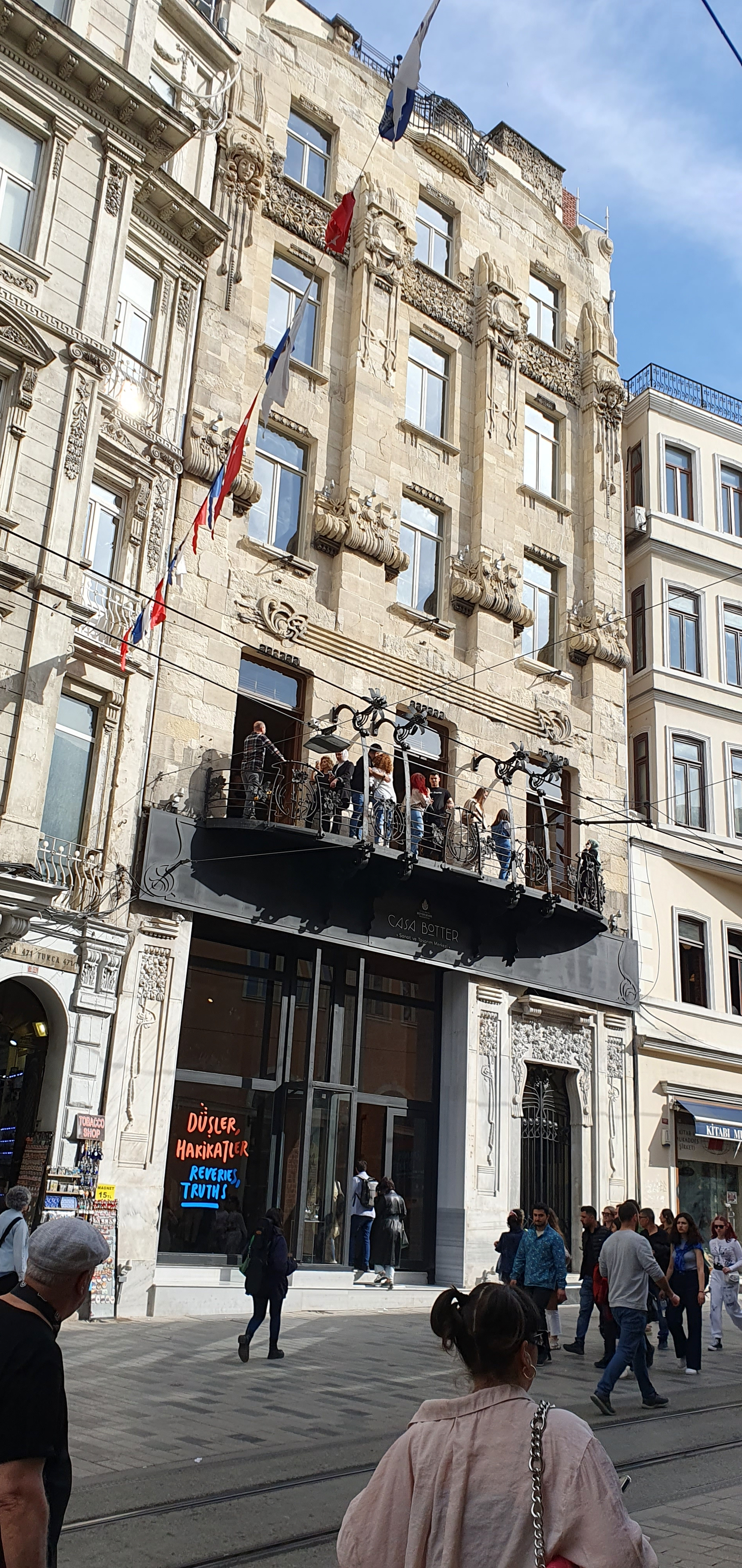
Botter Apartment on Istiklal Street, by Raimond D'Aronco (1900–1901)

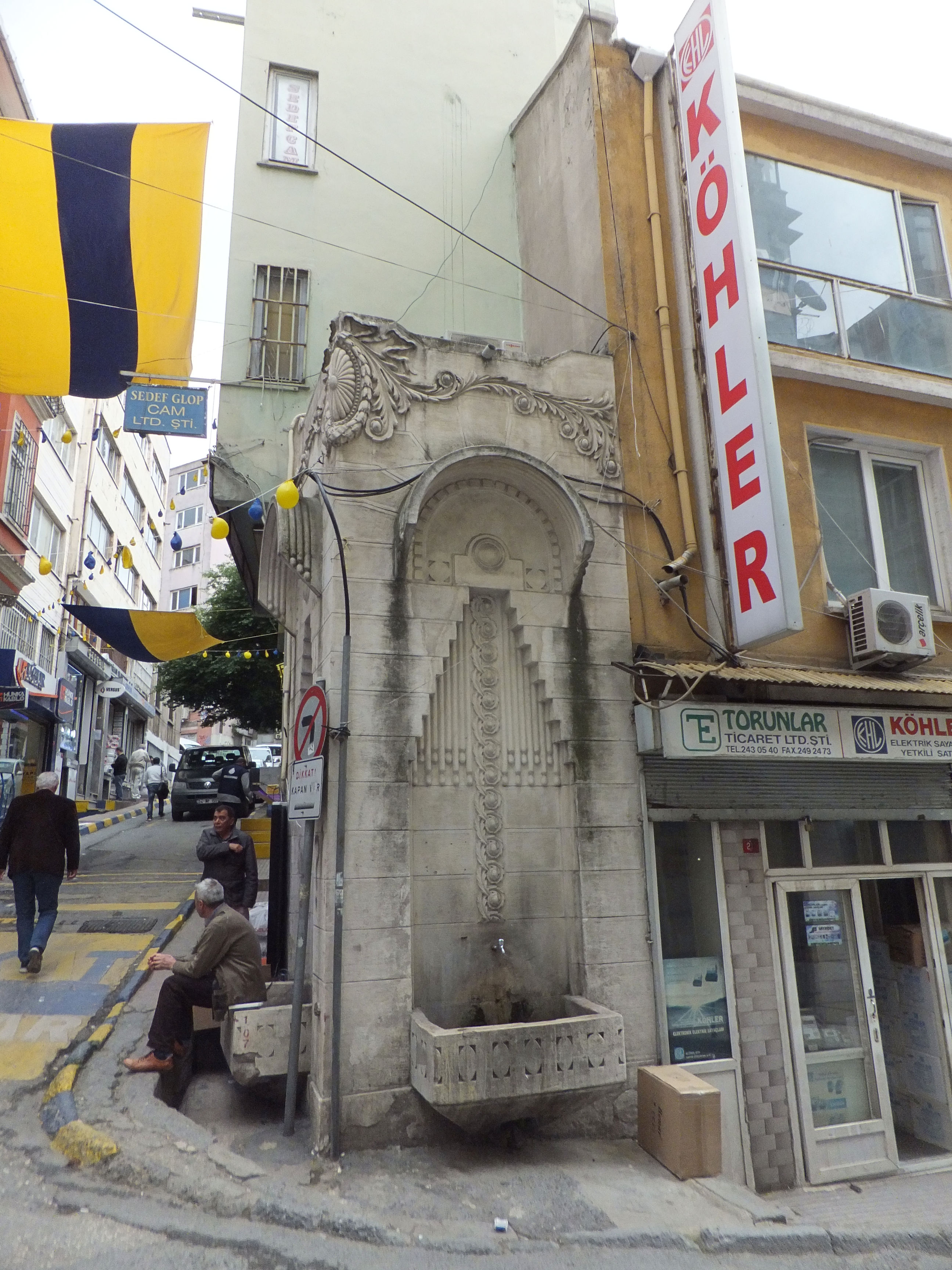
Laleli Fountain in Galata (1905, unconfirmed architect)

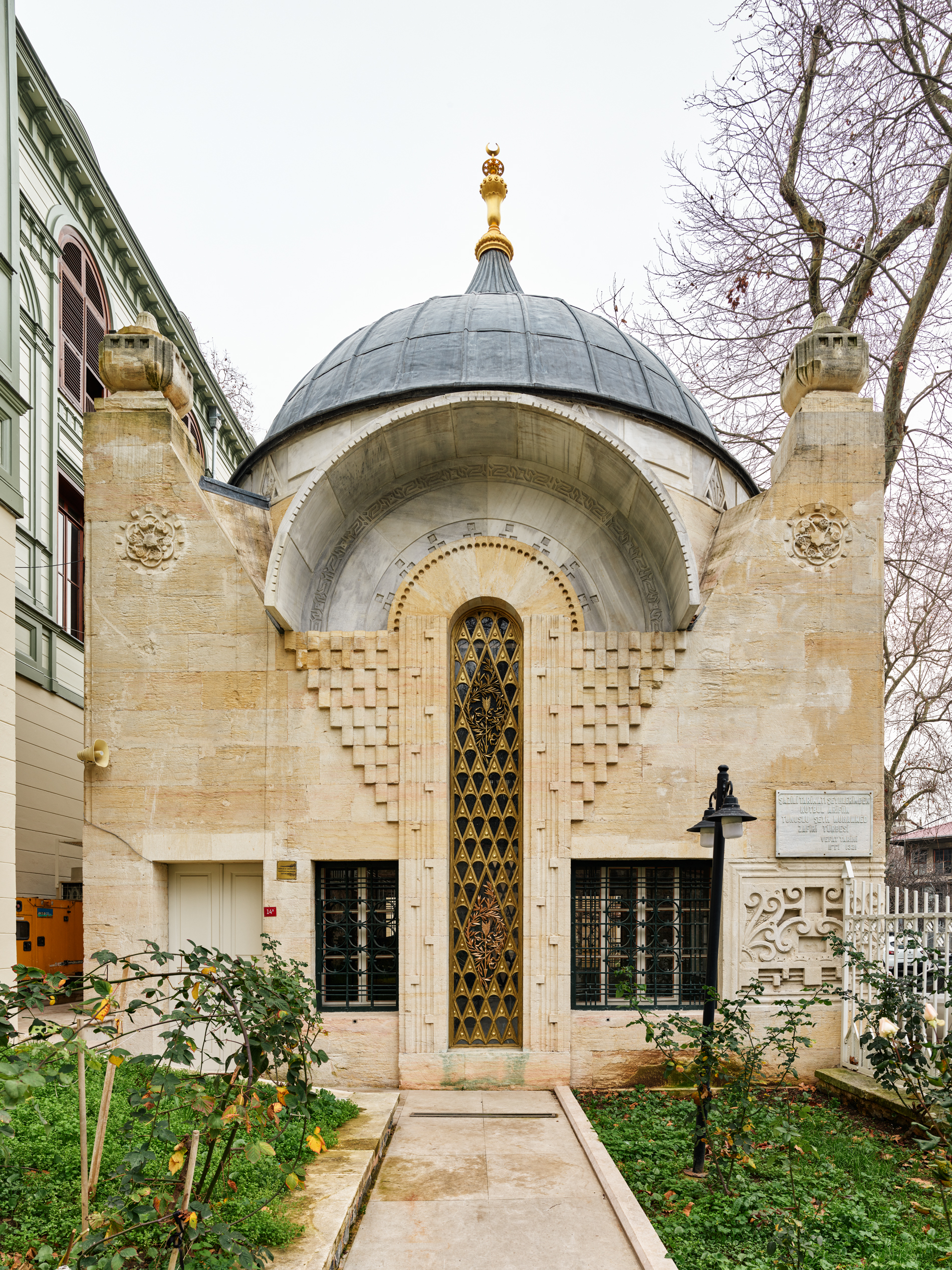
Tomb of Sheikh Zafir, by Raimond D'Aronco (1905–1906)

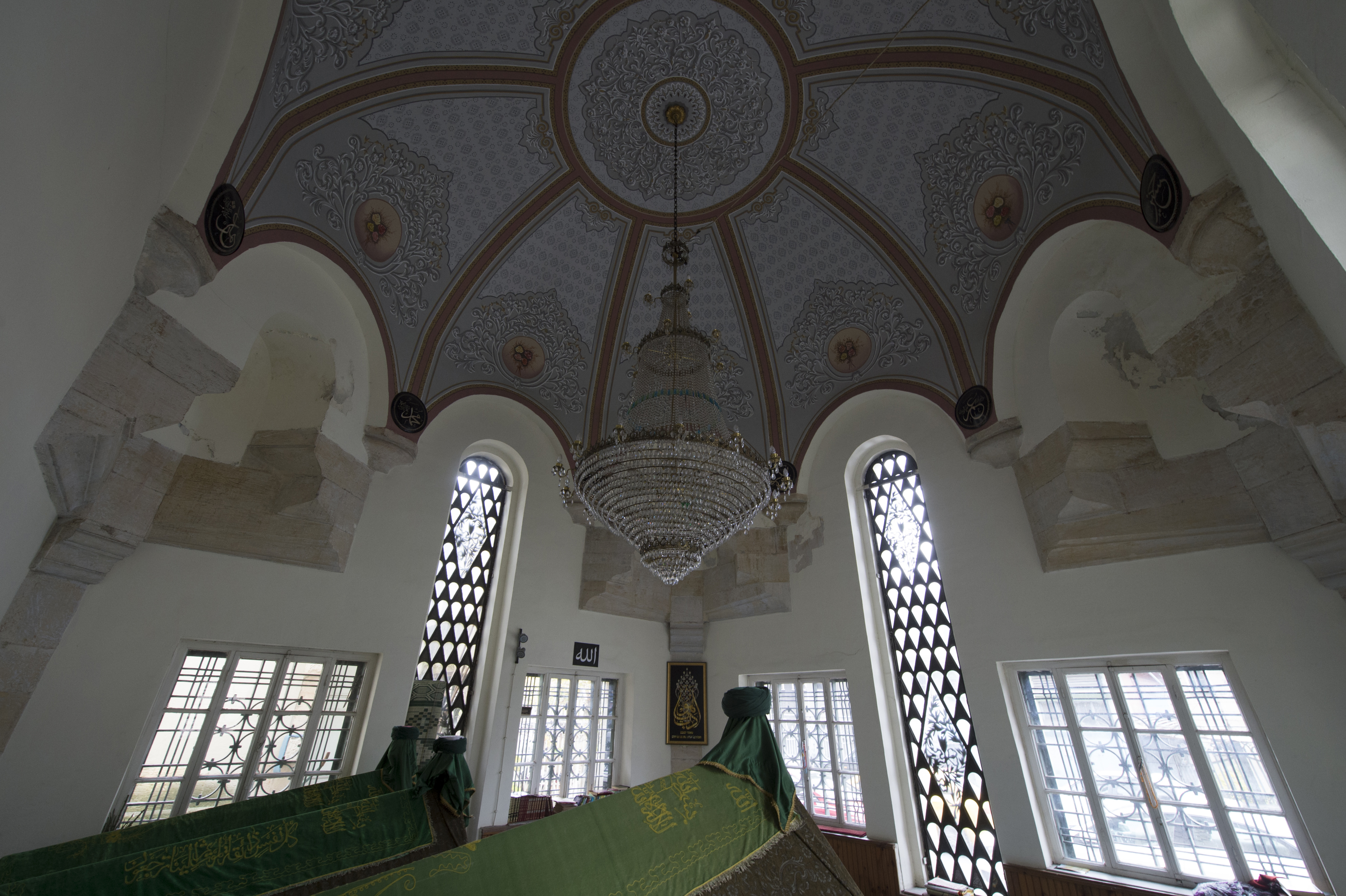
Interior of the Tomb of Sheikh Zafir

== First National Architectural Movement (early 20th century) ==
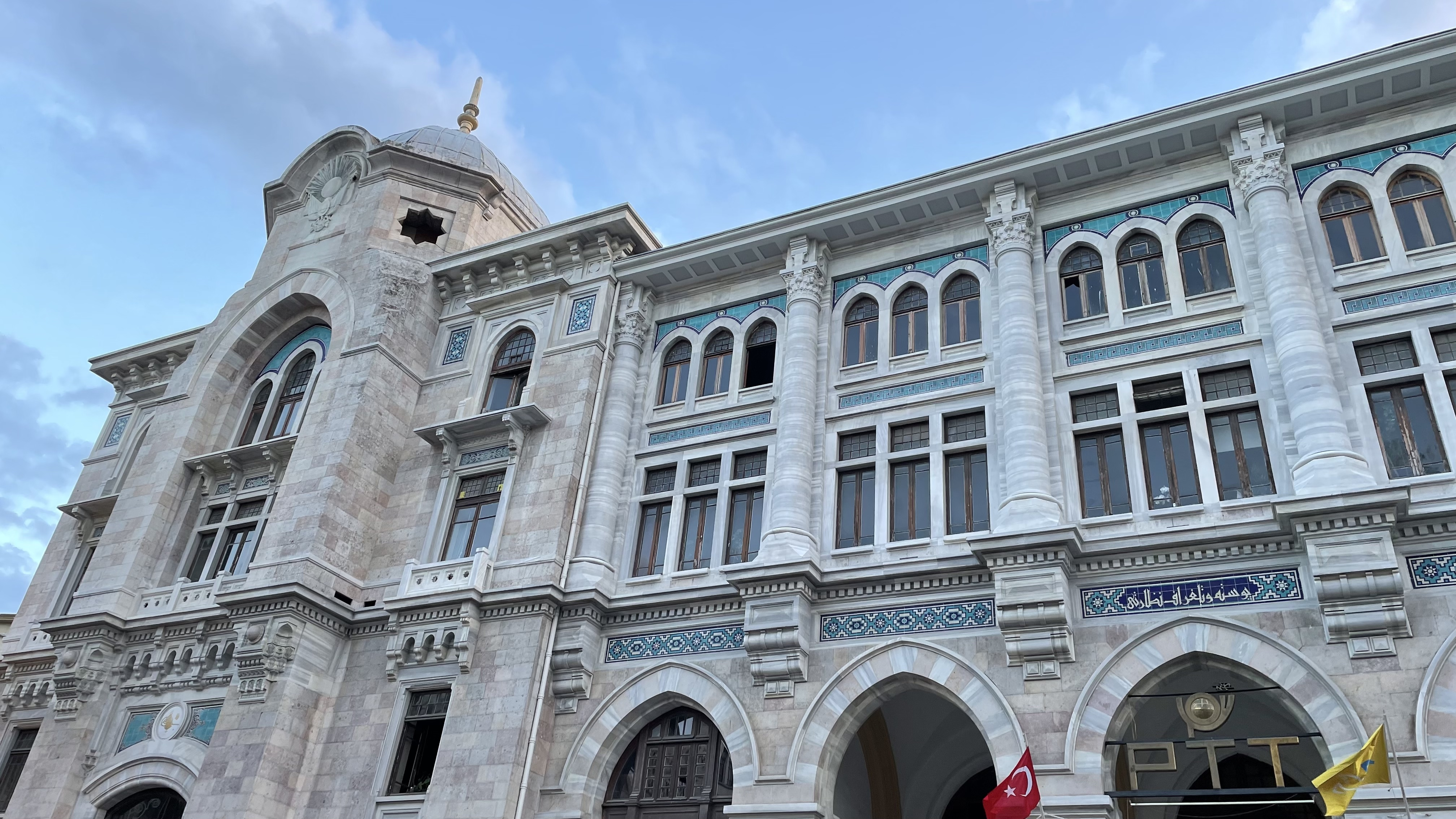
Grand Post Office in Sirkeci, Istanbul: one of the first Ottoman Revival buildings (1909), designed by Vedat Tek

The final period of architecture in the Ottoman Empire, developed after 1900 and in particular after the Young Turks took power in 1908–1909, is what was then called the "National Architectural Renaissance" and since referred to as the First national architectural movement of Turkish architecture. The approach in this period was an Ottoman Revival style, a reaction to influences in the previous 200 years that had come to be considered "foreign", such as Baroque and Neoclassical architecture, and was intended to promote Ottoman patriotism and self-identity. This was an entirely new style of architecture, related to earlier Ottoman architecture in rather the same manner was other roughly contemporaneous revivalist architectures related to their stylistic inspirations. New government-run institutions that trained architects and engineers, established in the late 19th century and further centralized under the Young Turks, became instrumental in disseminating this "national style".

The earlier Uṣūl-i Mi'marī-i Osmānī was influential in this movement and was used as a textbook at the Academy of Fine Arts in Istanbul (founded in 1883), but new Turkish architects also rejected some of the eclectic and revivalist impulses encouraged by that work. They choose instead to draw their ideas directly from observations of old Ottoman and Seljuk monuments, so as to elaborate what they viewed as a more purely "Turkish" style. They were also among the first to make measured drawings of historic Ottoman monuments and to study them as a national heritage.

The Ottoman Revival architecture of this period was based on modern construction techniques and materials such as reinforced concrete, iron, steel, and often glass roofs, and in many cases used what was essentially a Beaux-Arts structure with outward stylistic motifs associated with the original architecture from which it was inspired. The main difference between this style and the previous orientalist/revivalist trends led by European architects was a more conscious study of past Ottoman architecture and pre-Ottoman Turkish architecture in Anatolia in the search of a more uniform "Turkish" style. The new style focused outwardly on forms and motifs seen to be traditionally "Ottoman" such as pointed arches, ornate tile decoration, wide roof overhangs with supporting brackets, domes over towers or corners, etc. It also adapted these traditional elements for more modern building types such as railway stations, government offices, and other public buildings.

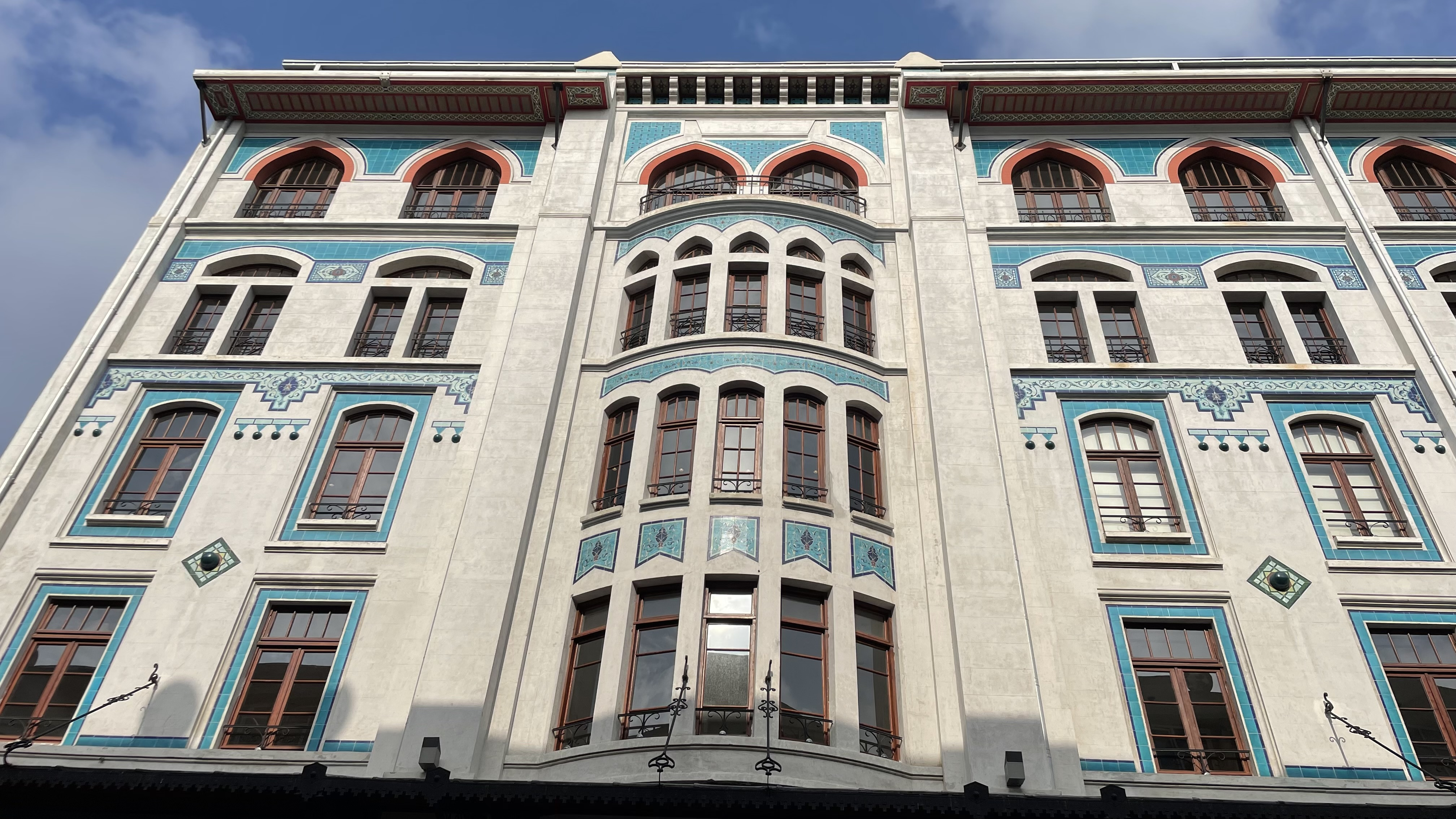
Liman Han in Sirkeci designed by Vedat Tek

The emergence of this movement also brought Turkish architects back to the forefront of Ottoman architecture. The most important representatives of this architectural period are Vedat Tek (or Vedat Bey) and Ahmed Kemaleddin Bey. One of the earliest and most important examples is the Istanbul Grand Post Office in Sirkeci, completed in 1909 and designed by Vedat Tek. The most important example of Kemaleddin Bey's works is the Vakıf Han, also in Sirkeci, begun in 1914. Both of these buildings, which have grand facades with corner domes, are among the finest landmarks of the First National Architecture Movement. The style was also employed for mosques, of which the traditional-looking Bebek Mosque (1913) by Kemaleddin Bey is among the best examples. Other important extant examples include the Istanbul ferryboat terminals built between 1913 and 1917, such as the Besiktas terminal by Ali Talat Bey (1913), the Haydarpaşa ferry terminal by Vedat Tek (1913), the Buyukada terminal by Mihran Azaryan (1915). Another example is the Sultanahmet Jail (1916–1917), now a Four Seasons Hotel. In Ankara, the earliest building in the style is the building that now houses the War of Independence Museum and served as the first house of the Turkish Republic's National Assembly in 1920. It was built in 1917 by Ismail Hasif Bey as the local headquarters for the Young Turks' Committee of Union and Progress.

Originally, this style was meant to promote the patriotism and identity of the historically multi-ethnic Ottoman Empire, but by the end of World War I and the creation of the Turkish Republic, it was adopted by the republican Turkish nationalists to promote a new Turkish sense of patriotism. In this role, it continued into, and influenced the later architecture of the Republic of Turkey.

First National Architecture Movement

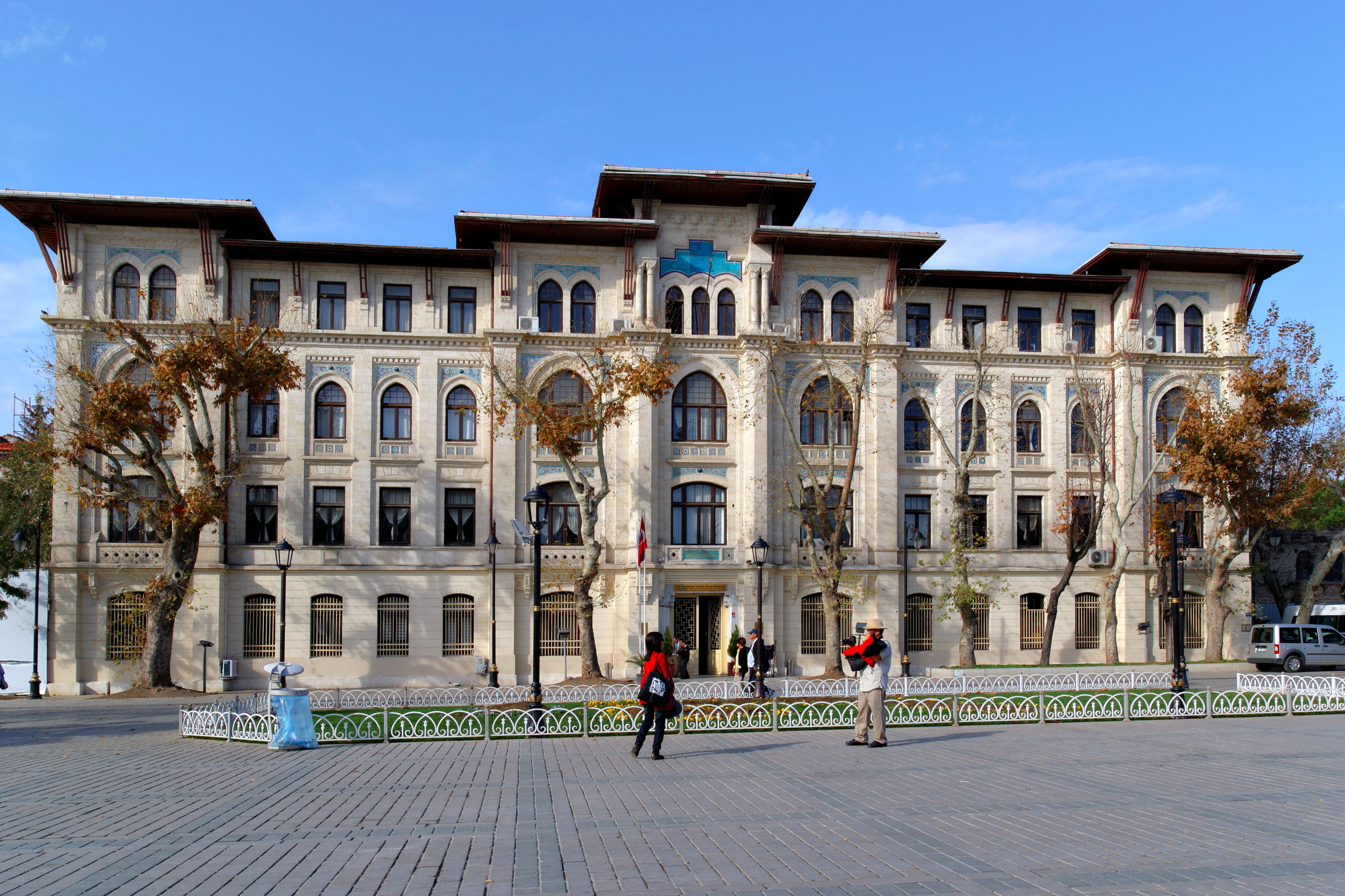
Defter-i Hakani building in Sultanahmet, Istanbul, built by Vedat Tek

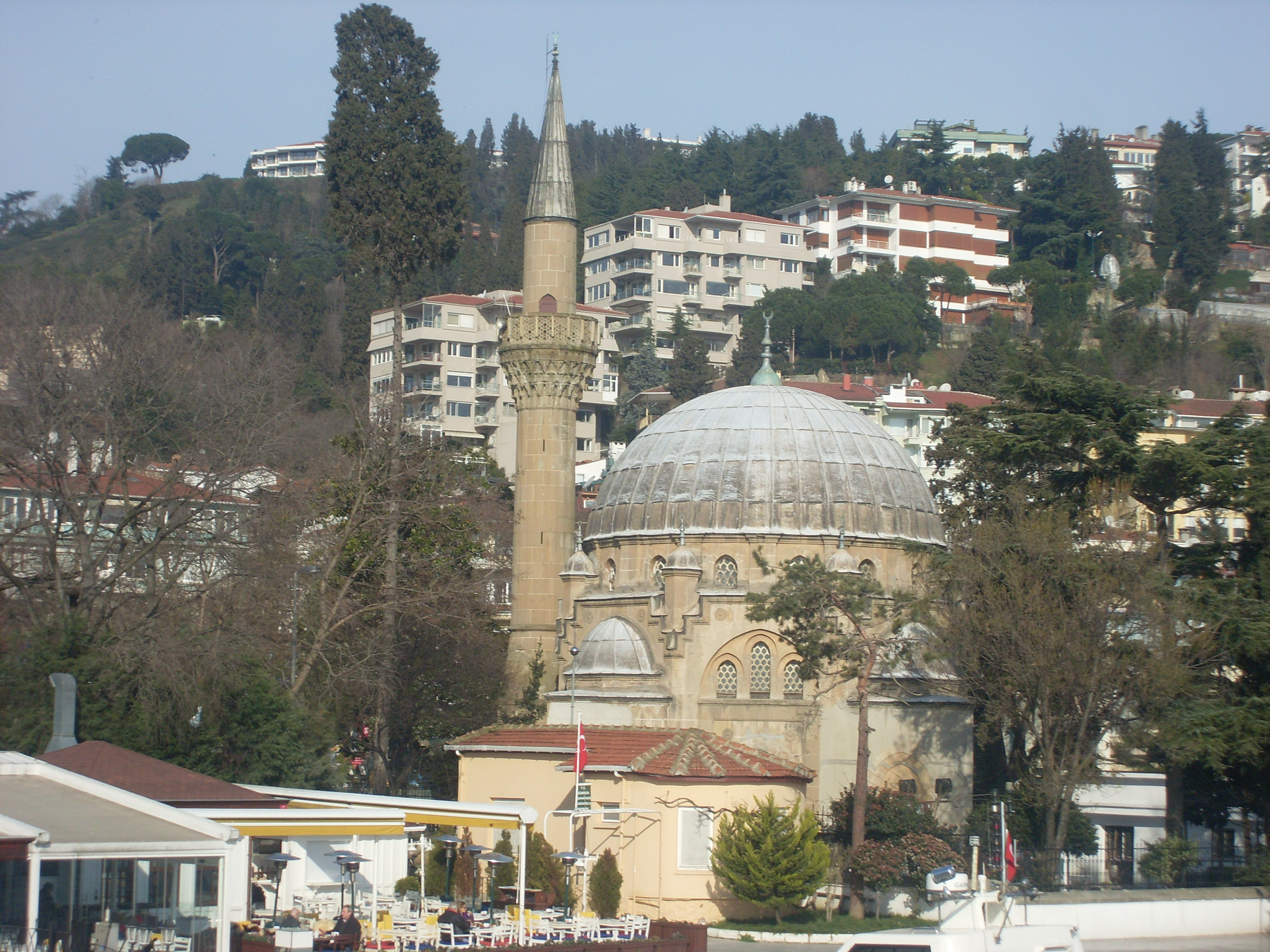
Bebek Mosque in Bebek, Istanbul, designed by Mimar Kemaleddin Bey (1913)

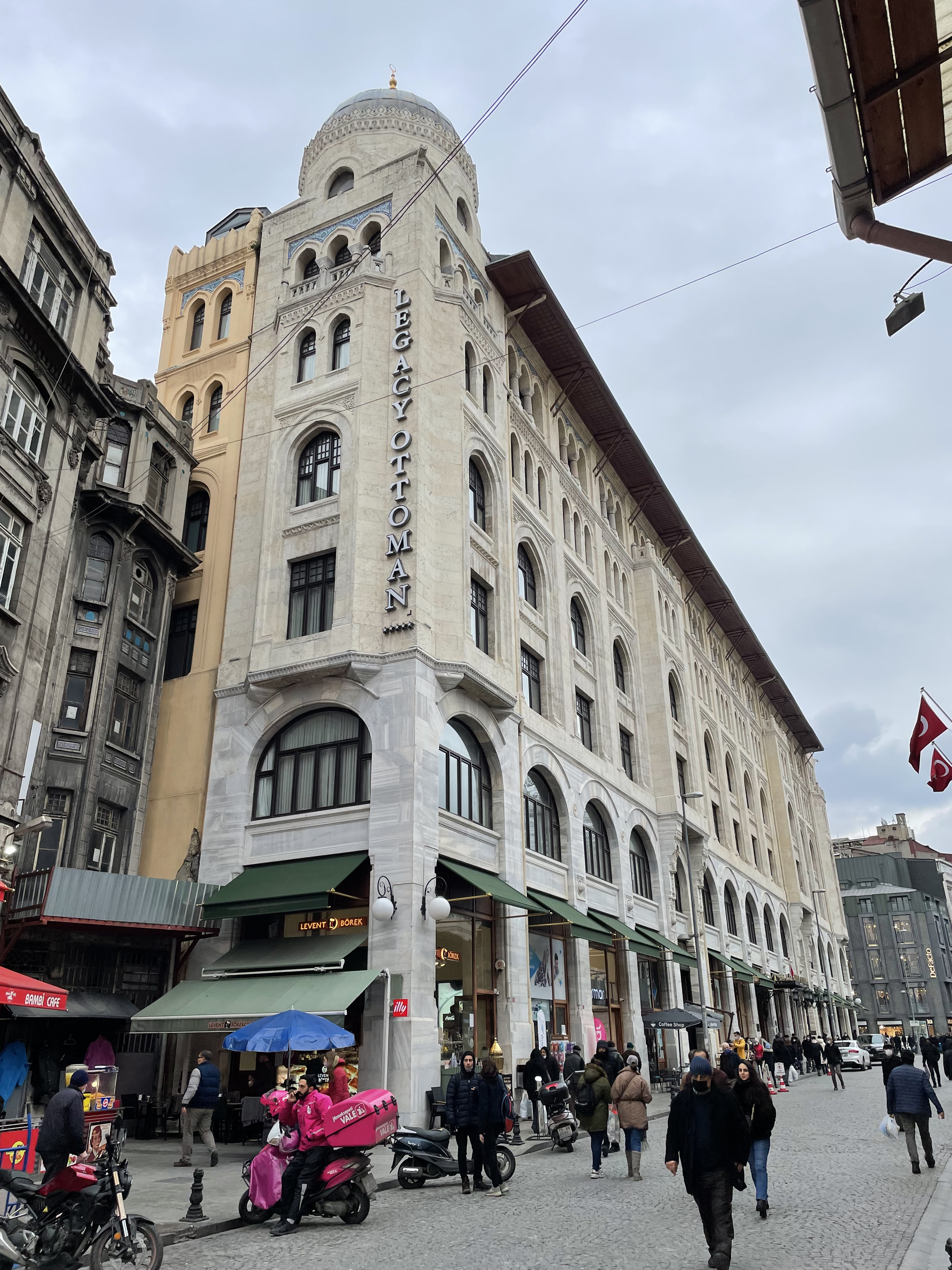
The 4th Vakıf Han in Sirkeci, Istanbul, by Kemaleddin Bey (c. 1914)

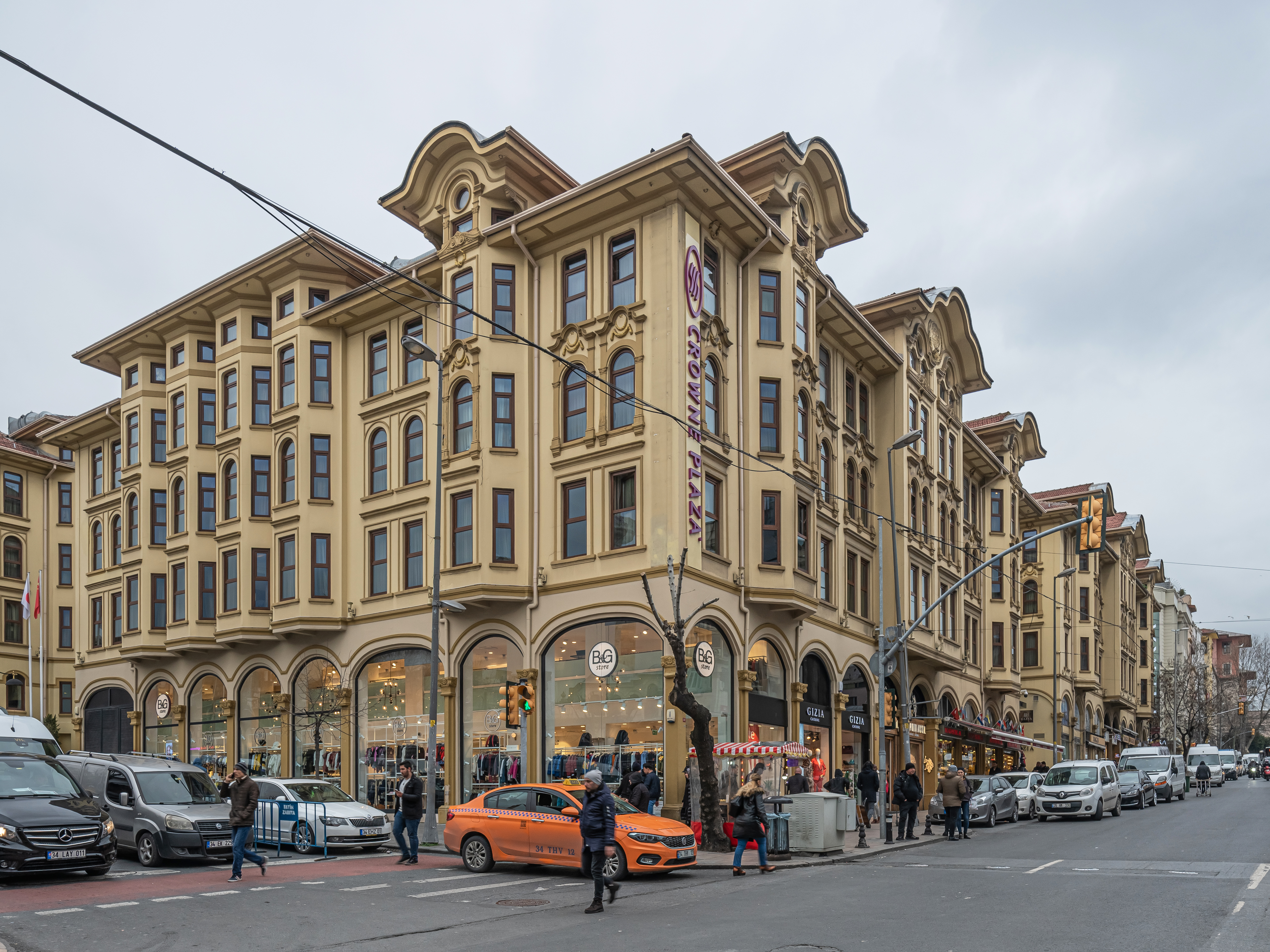
Tayyare Apartments in Laleli, Istanbul, by Kemaleddin Bey (1919–1922)

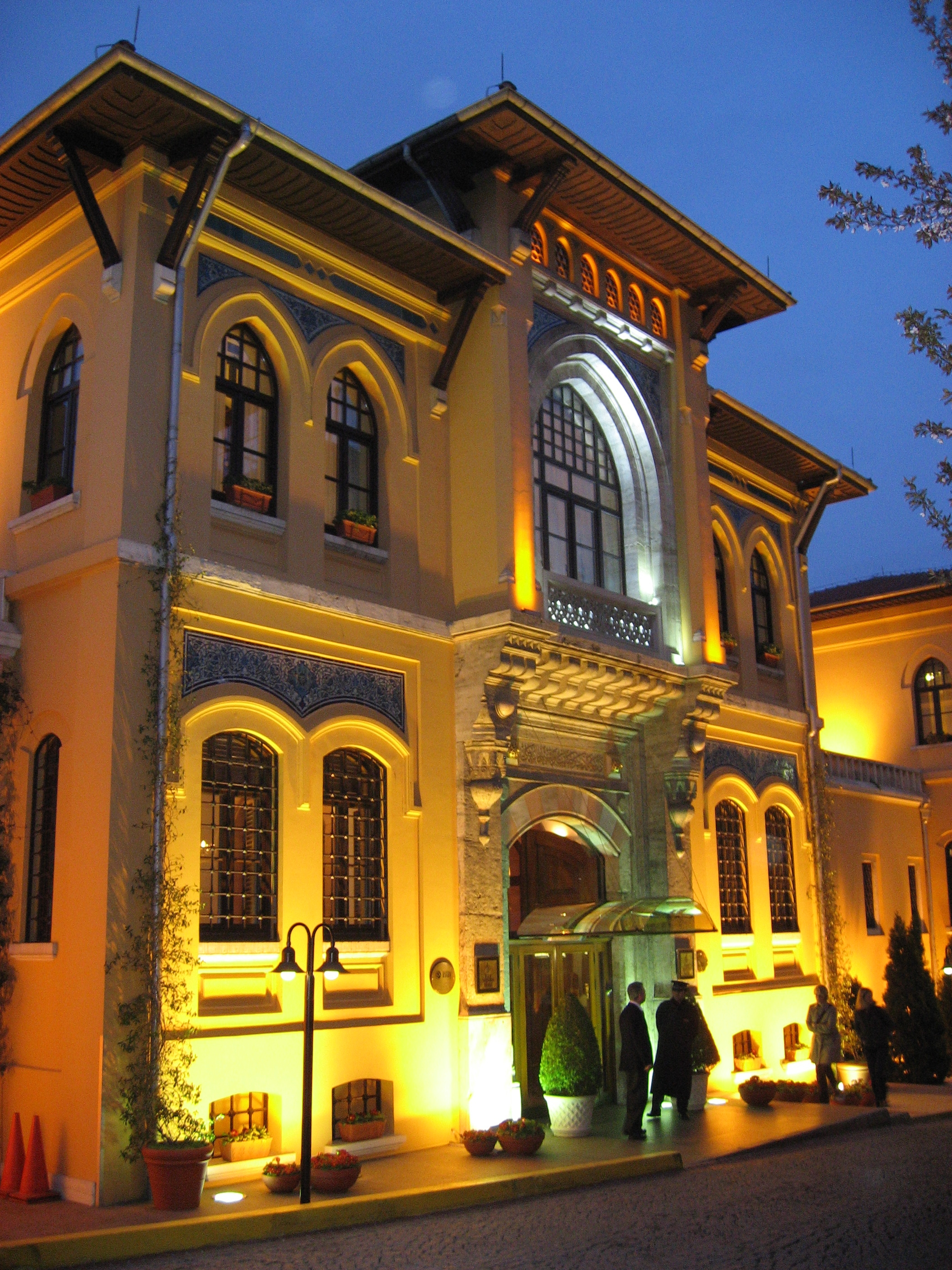
Sultanahmet Jail (1916–1917)

== Early scholarly interest in Ottoman architecture ==
It was in the late 19th century that the first modern scholarly attempts to define historic Ottoman architecture as a distinctive style or tradition were undertaken. The first work to do so was the Uṣūl-i Mi'marī-i Osmānī ("Fundamentals of Ottoman Architecture"), published in 1873 simultaneously in Ottoman Turkish, French, and German. The publication took place in the context of the 1873 World Exposition in Vienna and had official support from the Ottoman state. It was drafted by Marie de Launay and Pietro Montani, under the supervision of Ibrahim Edhem Pasha, the Minister of Trade and Public Works at the time. The volume sought to define Ottoman architecture as a cohesive and rational architectural tradition and to make it compatible with emerging European discourses on architecture at the time. It was also the first work to hail Sinan as a figure of prime importance in Ottoman architectural history who was worthy of universal recognition.

A year later (1874), Léon Parvillée, a student of Eugène Viollet-le-Duc, published L’architecture et décoration turque in French ("Turkish architecture and decoration"). While Viollet-le-Duc himself questioned the concept of an Ottoman architectural tradition in his preface to the book, Parvillée endorsed and promoted the idea that Ottoman architecture had originated from multiple older traditions and synthesized them into a unique style with specific principles. Parvillée was employed as an architect by the Ottoman state and was responsible for the restoration of many historic Ottoman monuments in Bursa, including some damaged by the 1855 earthquake. In the process, he also shaped modern understandings of the architecture of early Ottoman Bursa and some of the Ottoman monuments in Bursa owe much of their present-day appearance to his restorations.

== See also ==
- Yalı (waterside mansions)
- Ottoman architecture in Egypt
