= Yıldız, Beşiktaş =

Yıldız
- Neighbourhood
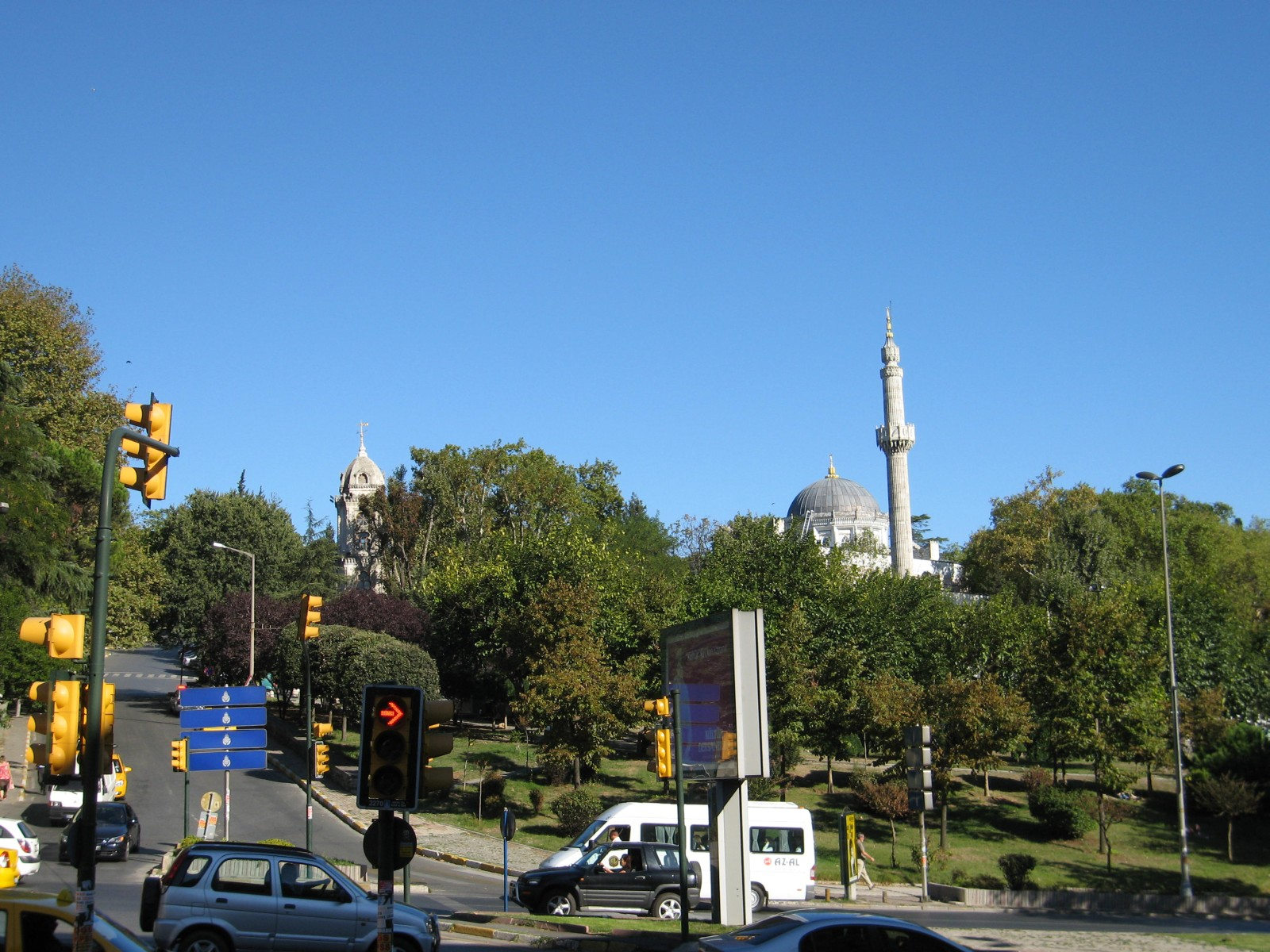
- A scene of Yıldız, mosque and the clock tower

- Location within Turkey Location within Istanbul
- Coordinates: 41°02′59″N 29°00′40″E
- Country: Turkey
- Province: Istanbul
- District: Beşiktaş
- Population (2022): 5,385
- Time zone: UTC+3 (TRT)

Yıldız (Turkish pronunciation: [jɯɫˈdɯz], literally 'star') is a neighbourhood in the municipality and district of Beşiktaş, Istanbul Province, Turkey. Its population is 5,385 (2022). The neighbourhood comprises some of Istanbul's well known historical locations, such as Yıldız Park and Yıldız Palace, the second-largest palace in Istanbul.

== History ==
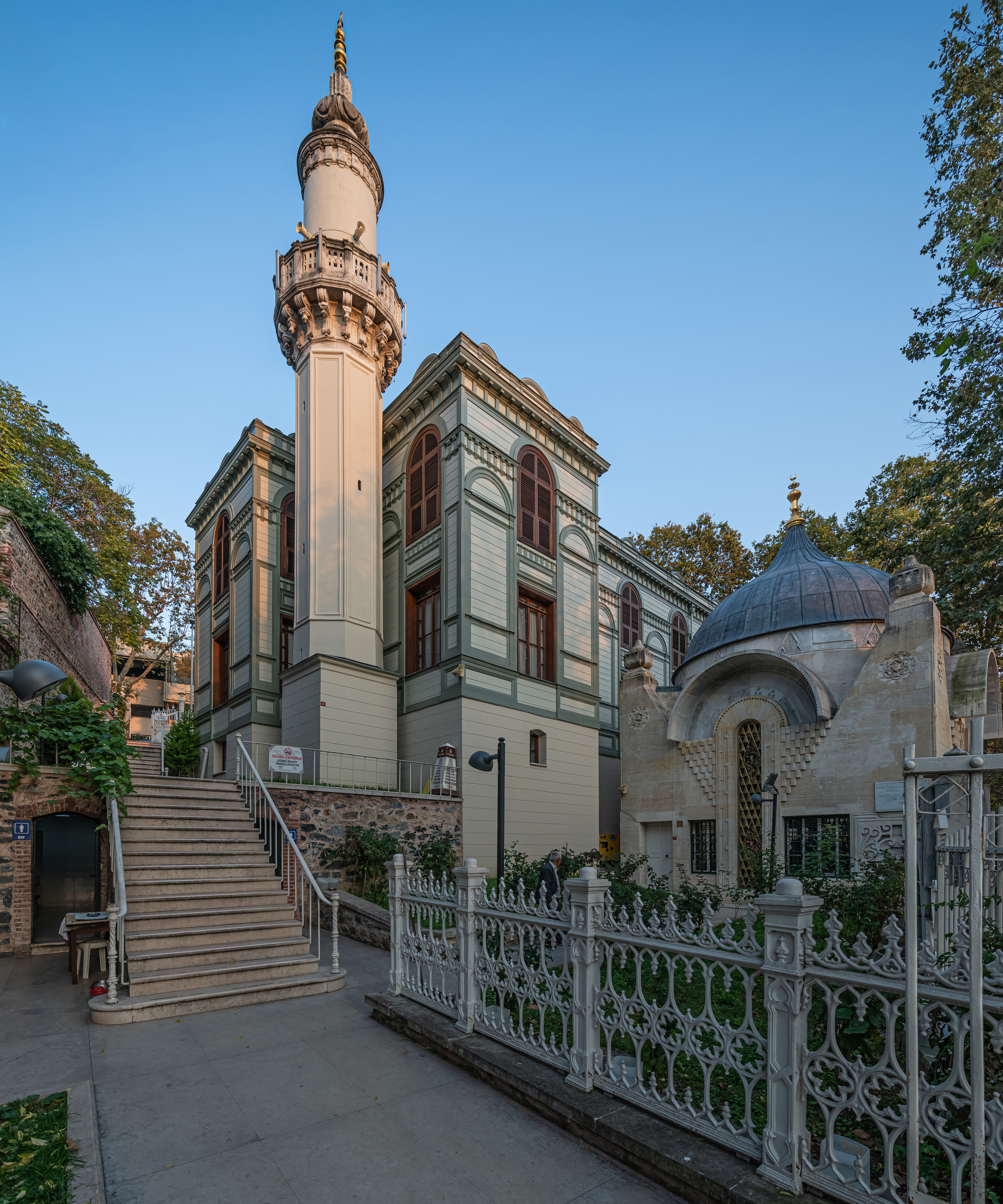
Ertuğrul Tekke Mosque

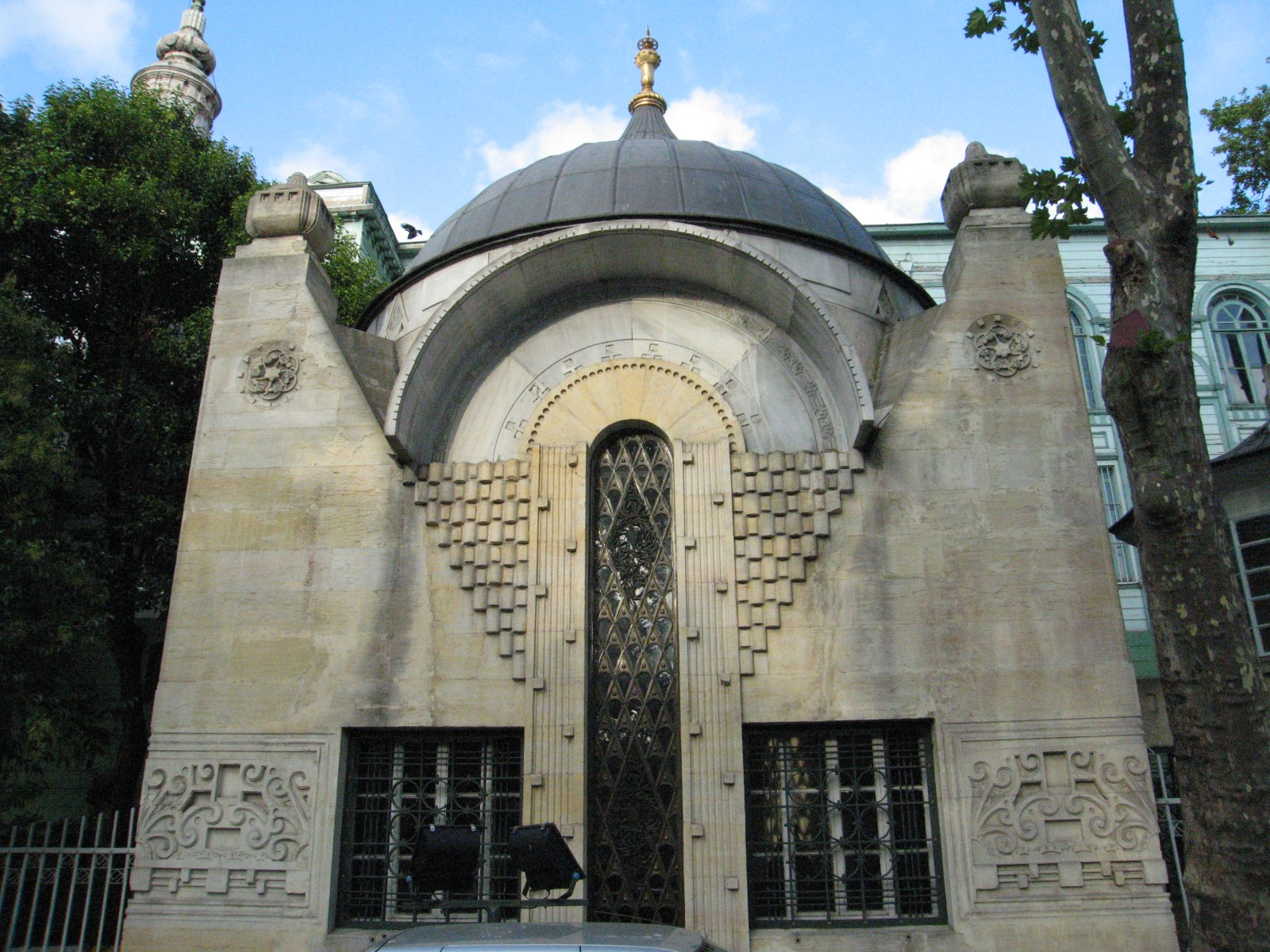
Turbe of Sheikh Zafir Effendi

The area of Yıldız was a coniferous forest in Byzantine times. Starting during the reign of Suleiman the Magnificent, the Ottoman sultans made it their hunting grounds. In the next centuries, it remained as a grove behind the seaside palaces. The neighbourhood began to flourish in the wake of construction of the palace in the 19th century. It took its name from the first pavilion, Yıldız Kasrı, commissioned by Selim III in early 19th century.

The area was the administrative center of the Ottoman Empire for the last 30 years, during the era of Abdul Hamid II.

== Places to see ==
The biggest part of the palace gardens, some old pavilions and the famous porcelain workshops are open to the public in what is now Yıldız Park. The well known Şale Köşkü or Chalet Pavilion is accessed through the park.

Today a considerable part of the neighbourhood's area is occupied by the old palace complex, which contains the main palace buildings, Yıldız Park, Yıldız Mosque and Yıldız Clock Tower as well as Yıldız Technical University.

In addition to these, the türbe of Yahya Efendi, a 16th-century Islamic complex, attracts around a million local visitors every year. Also, the türbe of Sheikh Zafir Efendi, which was designed by the architect Raimondo D'Aronco and built in 1886, is one of the good examples of Art Nouveau style in Istanbul. Just behind the türbe stands the Ertuğrul Tekke Mosque, which was built in 1887 and commissioned by the Ottoman sultan Abdul Hamid II.

== See also ==
- Yıldız Hamidiye Mosque
- Çırağan Palace
