= BJK İnönü Stadium =

Football stadium

İnönü Stadium
- Kartal Yuvası (Eagle's Nest)
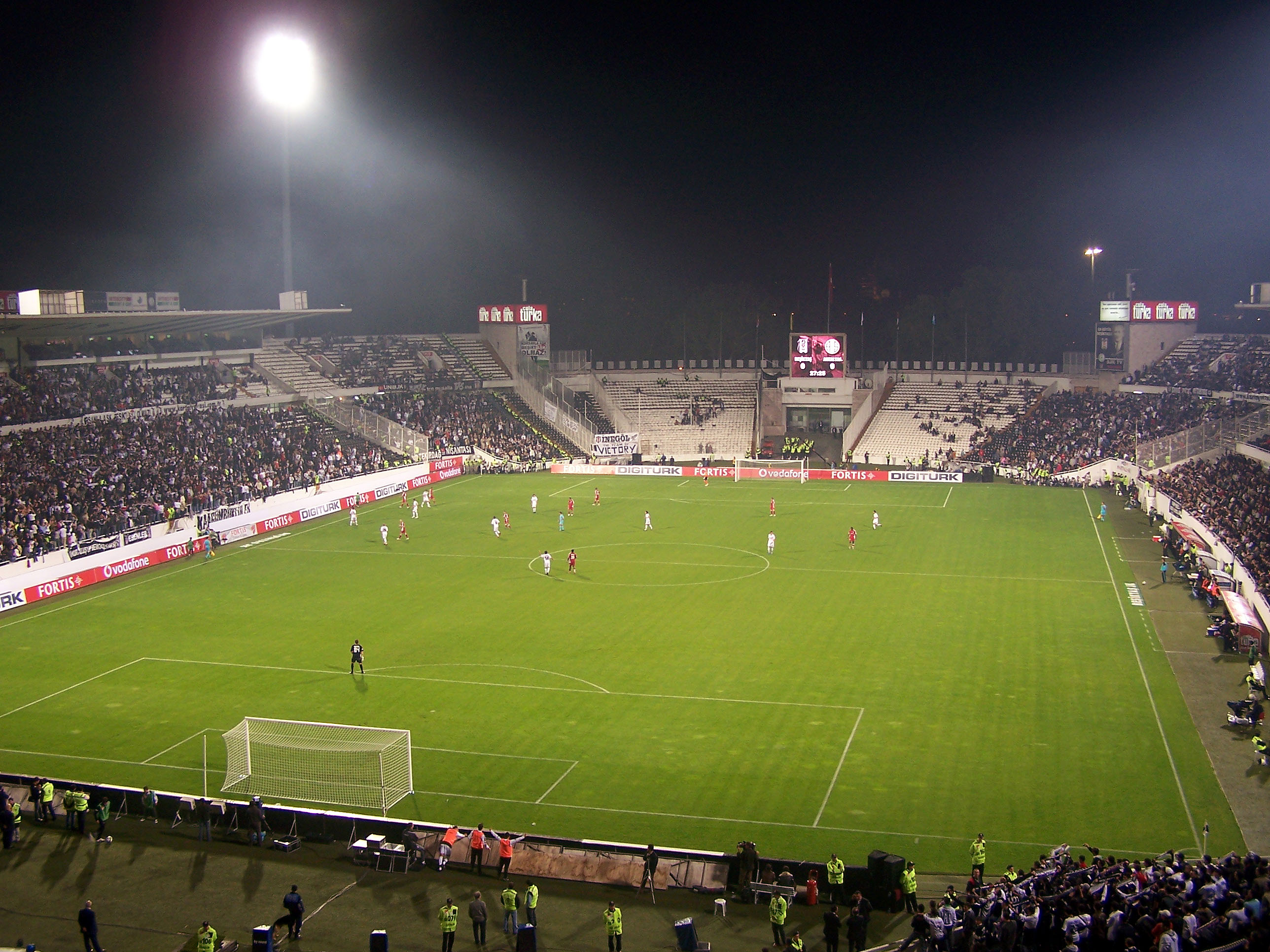
- Beşiktaş playing against Antalyaspor in a Turkish Cup game at the BJK İnönü Stadium in October 2008
- Interactive map of İnönü Stadium
- Full name: Beşiktaş İsmet İnönü Stadium
- Former names: Dolmabahçe Stadium (1947–1952); Mithatpaşa Stadium (1952–1973); İnönü Stadium (1973–2013)
- Location: Beşiktaş, Istanbul, Turkey
- Coordinates: 41°02′21″N 28°59′41″E
- Capacity: 32,145 (all-seater)
- Executive suites: 47
- Surface: Grass
- Field size: 105 m x 68 m (344 ft x 223 ft)

Construction
- Groundbreaking: 1939
- Built: 1947
- Opened: 19 May 1947
- Expanded: 1950, 2004
- Closed: 11 May 2013
- Demolished: 2 June – October 2013
- Architects: Paolo Vietti-Violi, Fazıl Aysu, Şinasi Şahingiray

İnönü Stadium (Turkish: İnönü Stadyumu) was a football stadium in Istanbul, Turkey and the home ground of the football club Beşiktaş. Previously, the ground had also been shared with Galatasaray and Fenerbahçe. The ground was located in Dolmabahçe, close to Dolmabahçe Palace in the district of Beşiktaş, on the European side of Istanbul. The stadium was demolished except for the walls of the Eski Açık stand and its historical towers in order to build a new stadium for Beşiktaş at the same location.

The all-seater stadium had the capacity to host 32,145 spectators.

== Structure ==
The BJK İnönü Stadyumu had four stands. The Kapalı stand which was parallel to the pitch at the north side could hold up to 5,881 supporters. It was regarded as the heart of the stadium, traditionally housing the most fanatical supporters. Facing the Kapalı was the Numaralı with a seating capacity of 5,237. The stands behind the goal areas were Eski Açık with a seating capacity of 7,962, and Yeni Açık with a seating capacity of 13,065. There were two towers on the left and right side of the Eski Açık stands that have been incorporated into the design of Vodafone Park, the current home of Beşiktaş. Before the stadium became an all-seater, the ground's capacity was over 39,000.

The Bosphorus, Dolmabahçe Palace, Dolmabahçe Clock Tower, Dolmabahçe Mosque, and Maiden's Tower were all viewable from the top rows of the Yeni Açık stand of the stadium, which made it the only stadium in the world from which a football fan could view two continents: Europe and Asia, which are separated by the Bosphorus strait.

== History ==
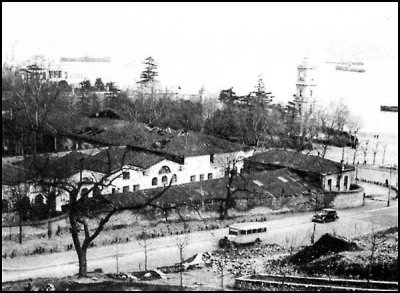
The stable of Dolmabahçe Palace was replaced by İnönü Stadium

BJK İnönü Stadium (originally named the Dolmabahçe Stadium) was designed by Italian architect Paolo Vietti-Violi, who collaborated with Turkish architects Şinasi Şahingiray and Fazıl Aysu for the project. The ground of Dolmabahçe Palace's stable was chosen as the location to build the stadium. The first foundation was laid on 19 May 1939, but construction work was halted due to the outbreak of the Second World War. The stadium was eventually inaugurated on 19 May 1947, by İsmet İnönü, the second President of Turkey and himself a Beşiktaş fan, and Lütfi Kırdar, the Governor of Istanbul. The initial capacity was 16,000. In the original project plan, there were two bronze statues of athlete figures at the Eski Açık stand: one throwing a discus, and the other throwing a javelin. However, the statues were never built due to financial concerns. The oil factory which was found behind the stadium was demolished to construct the Yeni Açık stand at the west part of the stadium in 1950 (hence the name Yeni Açık, meaning the New Open stand - referring to the two covered stands Numaralı and Kapalı, and the other uncovered stand, Eski Açık). Yeni Açık was eventually covered with a separate roof structure in 2004. Galatasaray and Fenerbahçe shared the stadium with Beşiktaş for many years, until the construction of the Ali Sami Yen Stadium in 1964, and the renovation of Şükrü Saracoğlu Stadium in 1982.

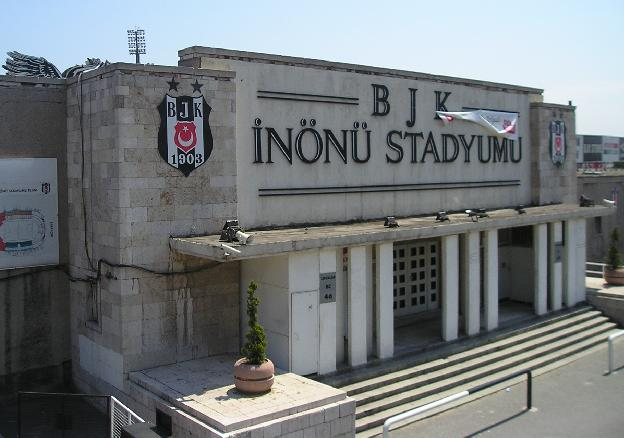
Main entrance of the stadium

The first football match at the Dolmabahçe Stadium took place between Beşiktaş and AIK Stockholm of Sweden, on 27 November 1947. The first goal in the stadium was scored by Süleyman Seba, the most famous and longest-presiding Chairman of the club (in the 1980s and 1990s), when he was a player at Beşiktaş. Beşiktaş lost this match 3–2. In 1952, the stadium was renamed as Mithat Paşa Stadium, and later in 1973, it was renamed as İnönü Stadium. A leasing contract was signed between Beşiktaş JK and the Ministry of Youth and Sports in February 1998 which gave all usage rights of İnönü Stadium to Beşiktaş JK for 49 years.

Renovation work took place at the stadium in 2004. The tartan track was removed within the scope of these renovations and the ground level was lowered by 4 meters to increase the capacity of the stadium to 32,145 spectators. The press seats were relocated to the Numaralı stand from the Kapalı stand. The executive suites that were found in the middle of the Kapalı stand were demolished and for the first time in Turkey, the wire fence between the stands and the pitch was removed for space. The number of gates was increased by 100%. A press center for Beşiktaş TV was built inside the stadium. Restrooms and lunch counters were also renovated. The Yeni Açık stand was covered with a metallic roof, and the stadium complied with UEFA standards.

The stadium's location is near the Bosphorus and is very close to Taksim Square. The stadium could be reached easily by many means of public transport (bus, ferry, metro, light-rail, funicular etc.) due to its central location.

There were four different parts of the stadium: Kapalı was where the most hot-blooded fans were during the matches. Yeni Açık was on the western side, facing the Bosphorus. Eski Açık was the smaller stand opposite Yeni Açık where visiting supporters were typically seated. Numaralı is where press, VIP, and protocol seats were located.

The 2012-2013 season was the last season of İnönü Stadium as Beşiktaş's home ground. The club played their 2013-14 and 2014-15 season home games mostly at the Atatürk Olympic Stadium and the Başakşehir Fatih Terim Stadium. Their new ground, Vodafone Park, was completed in April 2016.

== Records ==
Attendance Records
Rank	Attendance	Date	Game
1	40,000	11 May 2013	Beşiktaş – Gençlerbirliği
2	36,770	24 May 2009	Beşiktaş – Galatasaray
3	35,795	25 May 2003	Beşiktaş – Galatasaray
4	35,000	3 March 2013	Beşiktaş – Fenerbahçe
5	34,783	15 September 2009	Beşiktaş – Manchester United

== Music ==
- İnönü Stadium was used for many major music concerts. The first concert to take place at the stadium was Bryan Adams on 28 July 1992. This marked the first stadium concert in Istanbul.
- Michael Jackson performed during his Dangerous World Tour on 23 September 1993 in front of a crowd of 48,000. He also scheduled to perform at the stadium during his Dangerous World Tour on 4 October 1992, but was cancelled due to a vocal cord ailment.
- Madonna performed during her The Girlie Show World Tour on 7 October 1993 to an audience of 54,000 people.
- Iron Maiden performed at the stadium on July 26, 2013 as part of their Maiden England World Tour, marking the stadium's last concert before its demolition and reconstruction.
- Other major events in the 1990s, 2000s and 2010s included performances by: Guns N' Roses, as part of the Use Your Illusion Tour; Metallica as part of the Nowhere Else to Roam and World Magnetic Tour; Bon Jovi as part of the I'll Sleep When I'm Dead Tour; Elton John as part of The One Tour; Scorpions as part of the Face The Heat Tour; Sting as part of the Ten Summoner's Tales Tour; Rod Stewart as part of the A Spanner in the Works Tour; Tina Turner as part of the Wildest Dreams Tour and Rihanna as part of the Diamonds World Tour. The stadium also hosted the heavy metal Sonisphere Festival in 2010, featuring the "big four" of thrash metal: Metallica, Slayer, Megadeth, and Anthrax, in addition to Manowar, Rammstein and Alice in Chains.

== New Inönü Stadium project ==
Due to the unique location of the stadium and its legal status as a "historic monument" protected by the High Council of Monuments of Turkey, the renewal project had to be modified and postponed several times and all official requests, efforts, renewal attempts were denied until 2013. The administrative procedures were eventually completed, and all required permission was given to the club. Club president Fikret Orman announced that the new stadium, with a total capacity of 41,903 spectators, 143 luxury lodges, and one "1903 stand", will be constructed. Demolition works started on 2 June 2013, following the end of the promotion play-offs of the TFF First League. Construction works were completed in April 2016, and the estimated cost of the project was around $80 million.

The project of the new stadium was designed by DB architects. The old stadium was demolished, except for the walls and two towers of the Eski Açık stand, since these structures are considered historic monuments.

== See also ==
- Beşiktaş J.K.
