= Yıldız Park =

Urban park in Beşiktaş, İstanbul, Turkey

- Yıldız Parkı
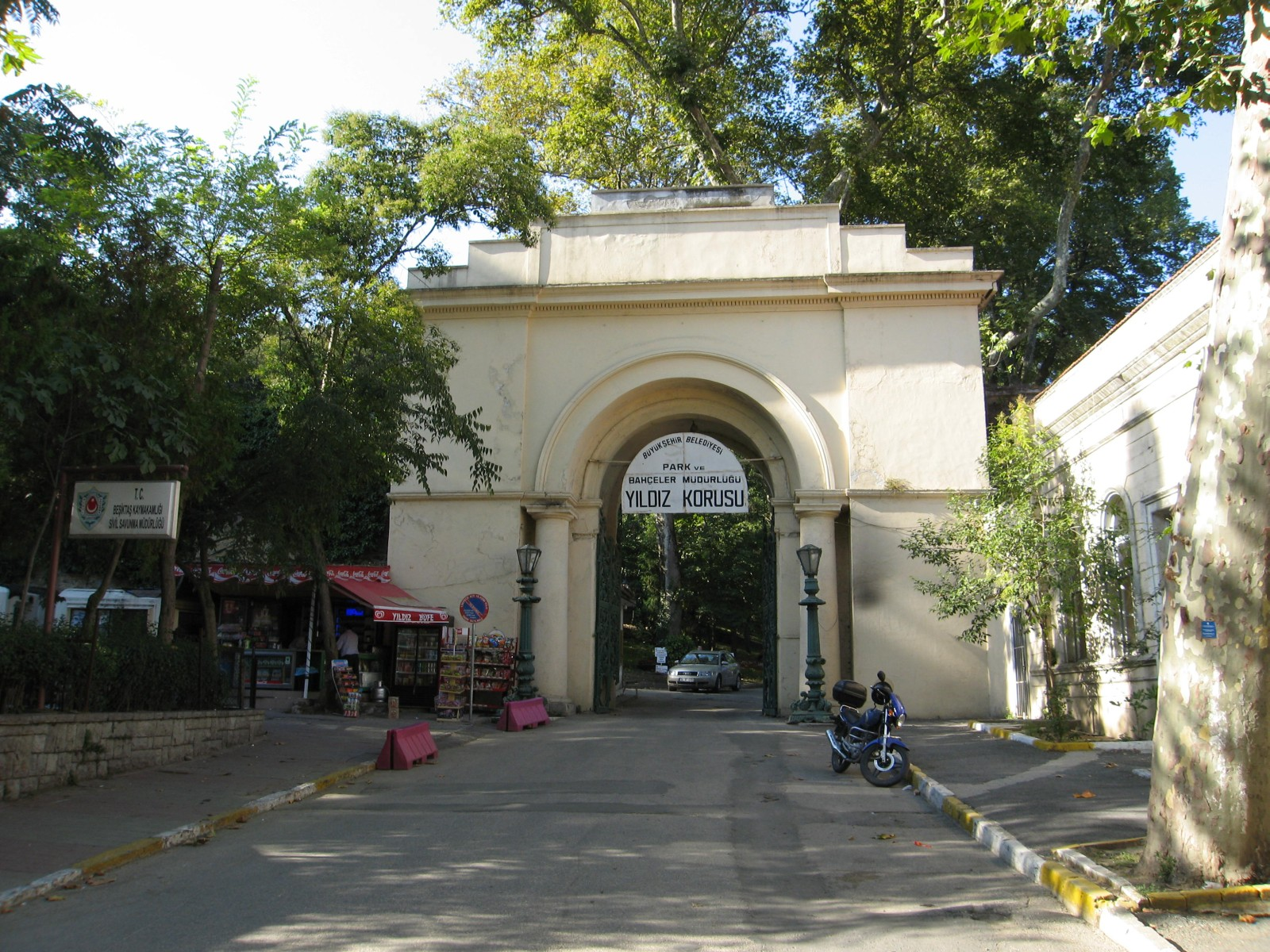
- Main entrance to Yıldız Park
- Type: Urban park
- Location: Istanbul, Turkey
- Coordinates: 41°02′54″N 29°00′56″E

Yıldız Park (Turkish: Yıldız Parkı) is a historical, urban park in the Beşiktaş district of Istanbul, Turkey. It is one of the largest public parks in Istanbul. The park is located in Yıldız quarter between the palaces of Yıldız and Çırağan.

== History ==
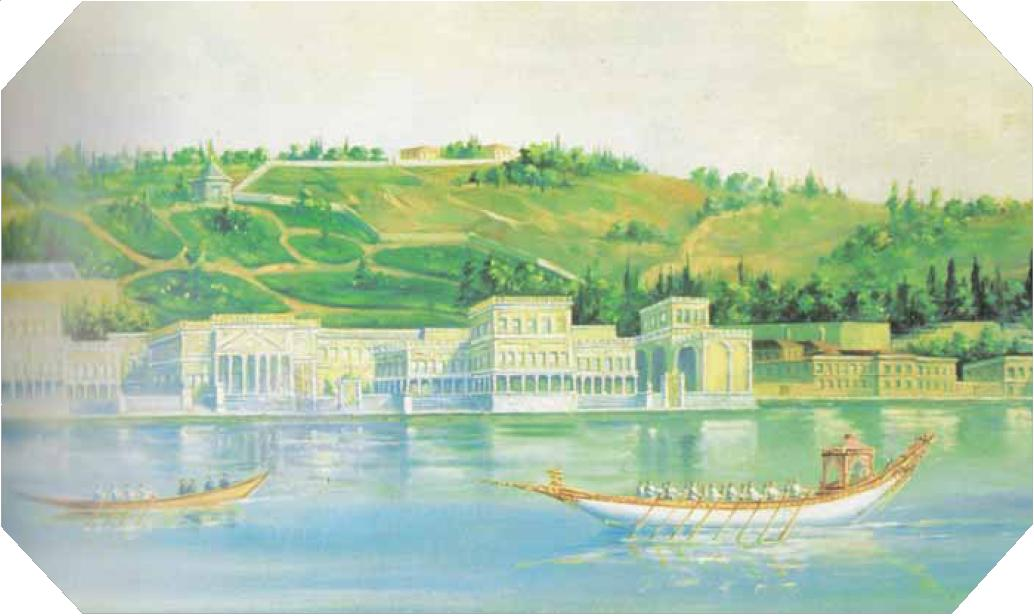
Painting of Çırağan Palace with the hilly slopes of Yıldız Park, seen from the Bosphorus (1840)

Yıldız Park was once part of the imperial garden of Yıldız Palace. Extending down the slopes from the palace, this walled park was reserved only for palace dwellers during the reign of Sultan Abdulhamid II.

The area of Yıldız used to be a forest in Byzantine times. Starting during the reign of Suleiman the Magnificent, the sultans made it their hunting grounds. In the next centuries, it remained as a grove behind the seaside palaces. The neighbourhood began to flourish in the wake of construction of the palace in the 19th century. It took its name from the first pavilion, namely Yıldız Kasrı, commissioned by Selim III in early 19th century.

The 25-acre (0.10 km^{2}) of the palace's external garden were surrounded by high walls and detached from a grove during the reign of Abdulhamid II in the 19th century. A small artificial lake, pavilions, summer houses and a porcelain factory were established in this section.

== Today ==
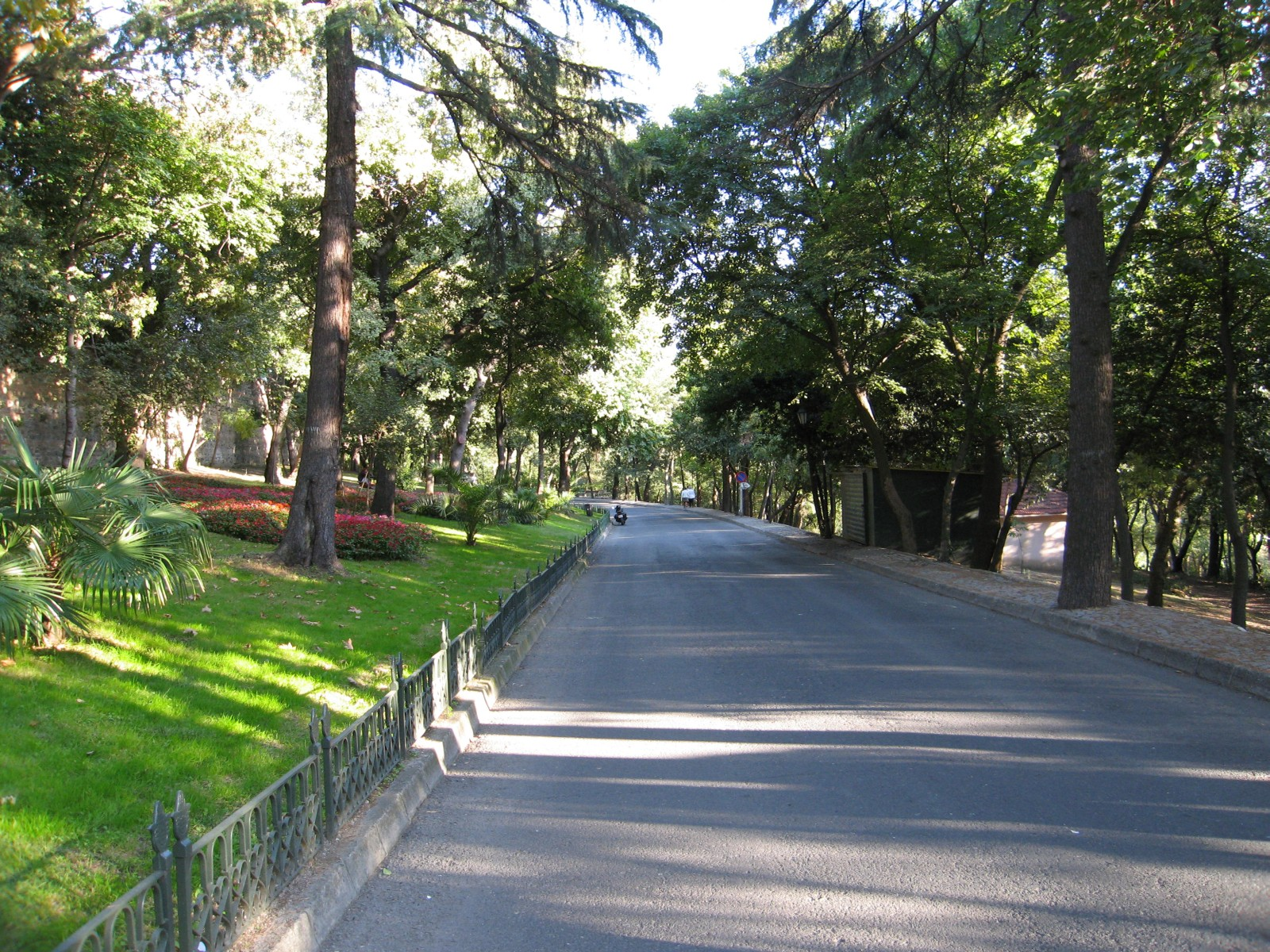
Inside Yıldız Park with the way to the porcelain manufactury

At present, Yıldız Park is a beautiful garden complex set in a very large park of flowers, plants and trees, gathered from every part of the world, dating from the Ottoman era. Park grounds offer panoramic views of the Bosphorus. The park is a popular picnic place especially for the weekends. Two beautiful Ottoman era pavilions, namely the Çadır and Malta pavilions, are today café/restaurants where people have breakfast or lunch, or drink a cup of tea or coffee.

The park is separated into two sections, the outer section is open to the public and comprises the Şale, Çadır and Malta pavilions and the still-operating Yıldız porcelain factory. The vegetation of the park includes magnolia, bay leaves, Judas trees, silver limes and horse-chestnuts. Furthermore, the park shelters oak, cypress, pine, yew, cedar and ash trees. Besides, the outer section has two man-made lakes.

== Gallery ==
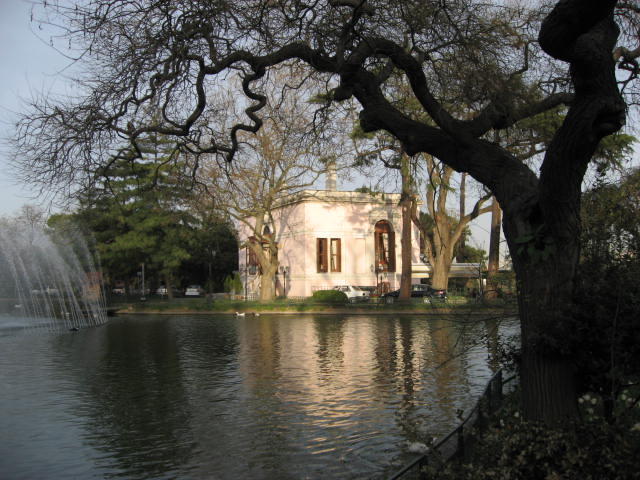
Çadır Pavilion within the grounds of the park

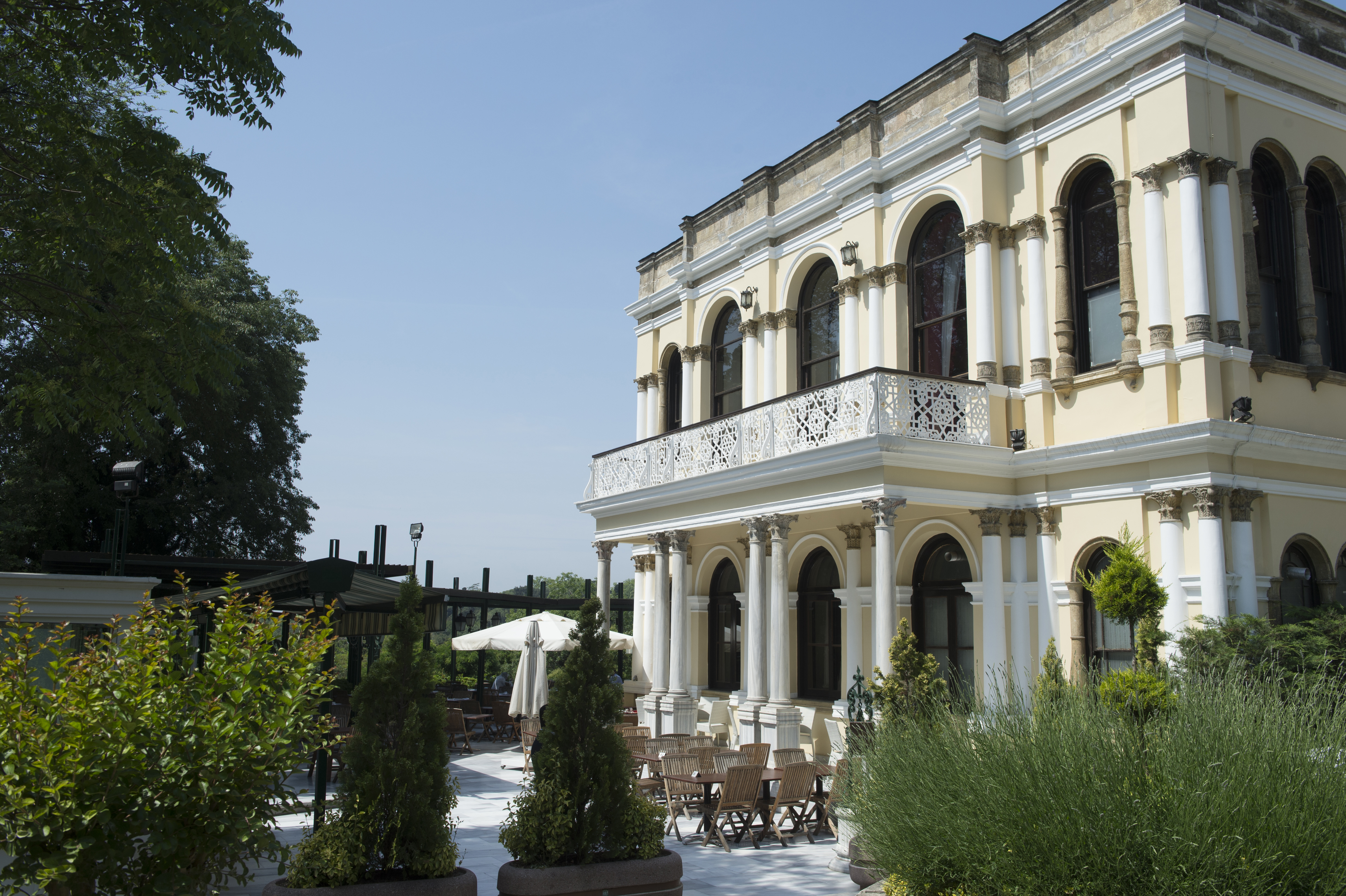
Malta Kiosk, now open to the public

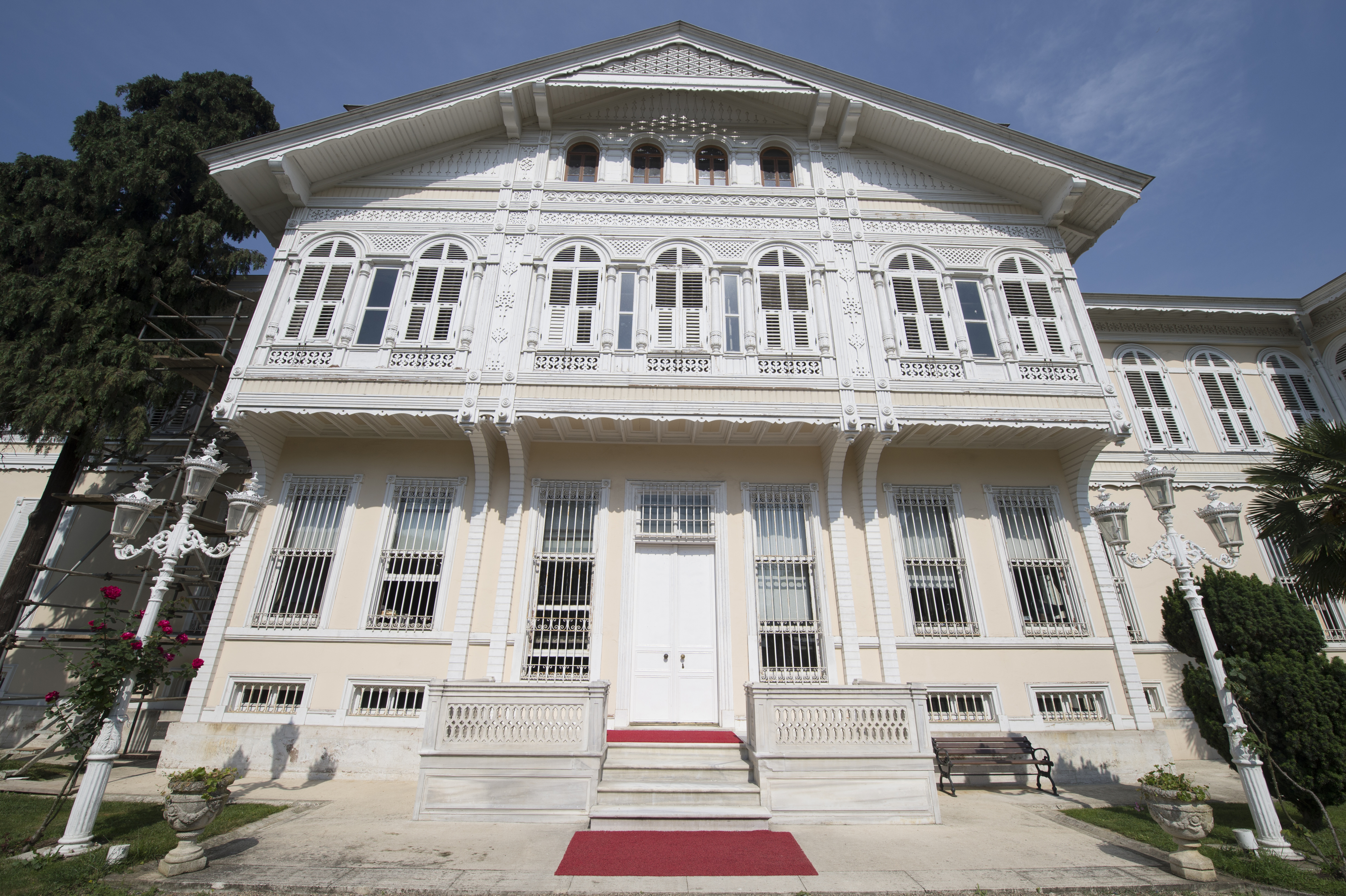
Façade of the main building of Şale Pavilion

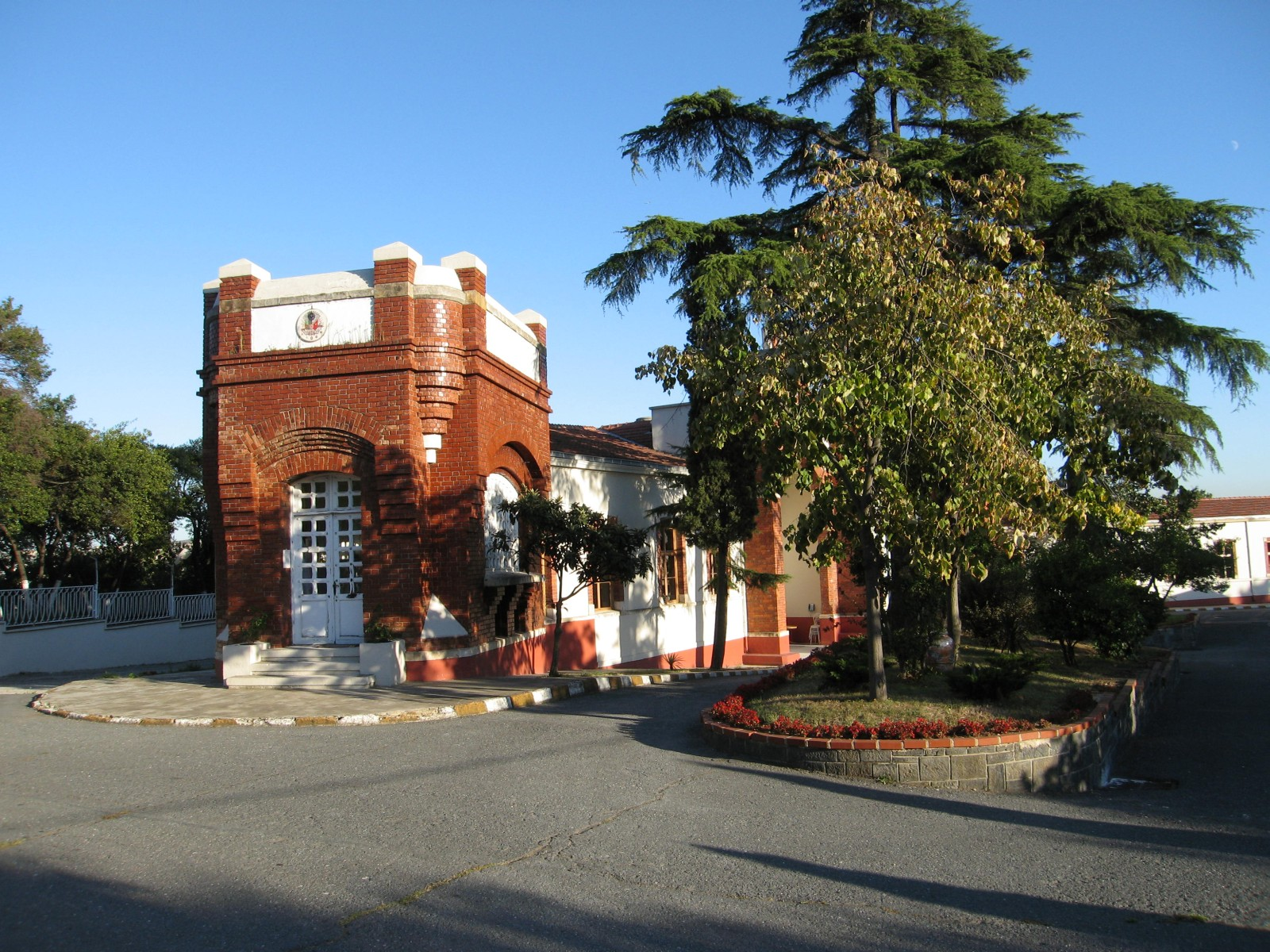
Yıldız Porcelain and Tile manufactury complex

== See also ==
- Yıldız Clock Tower
