= İzmit Clock Tower =

- İzmit Saat Kulesi
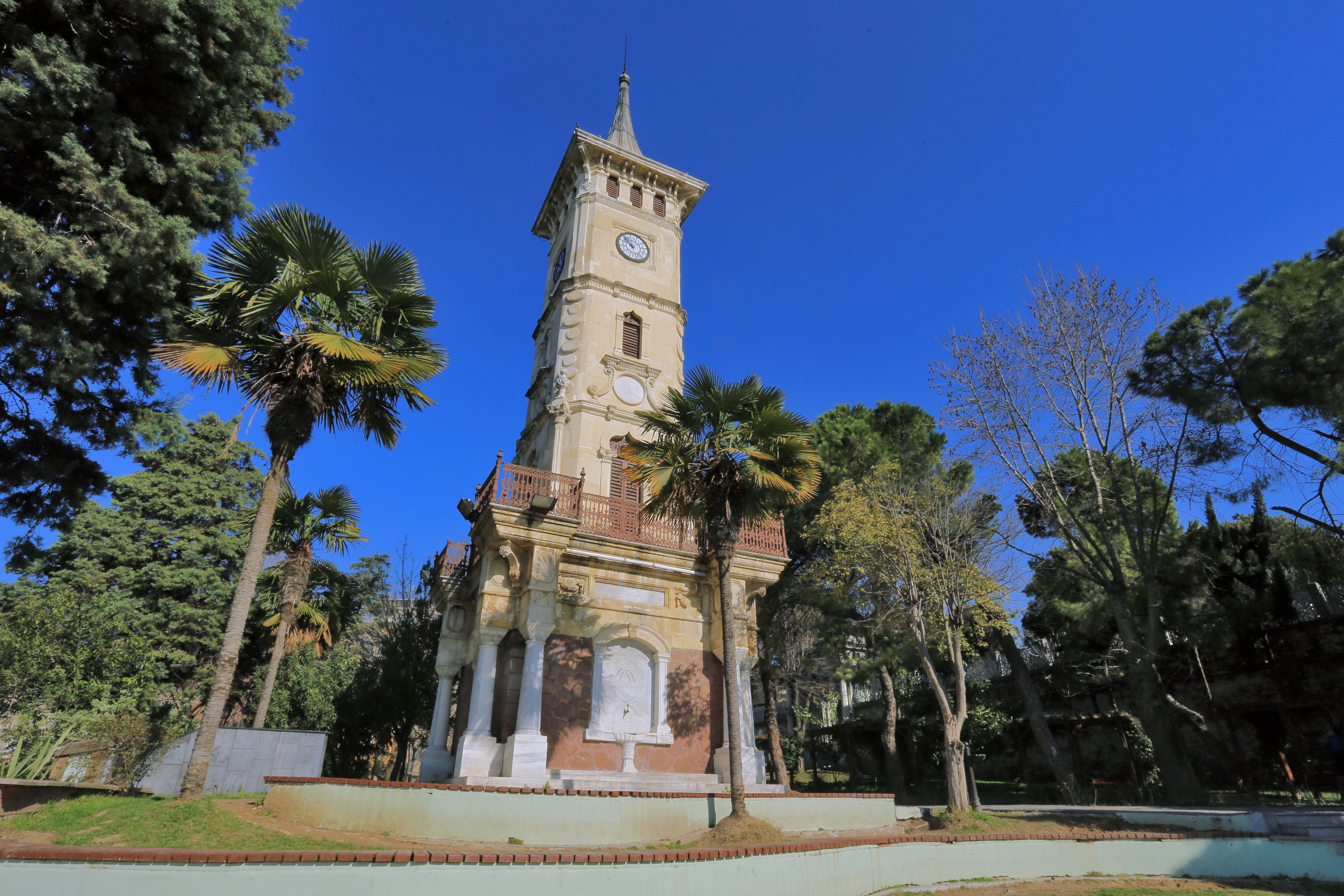
- Interactive map of the İzmit Clock Tower area

General information
- Type: Clock tower
- Architectural style: Ottoman architecture
- Location: İzmit, Turkey, Hürriyet Cad., Kemalpaşa
- Coordinates: 40.762806°N 29.919611°E
- Completed: 1902
- Renovated: 1970

Height
- Height: 16.4 m

Technical details
- Floor count: 4
- Floor area: 3.65 m × 3.65 m (12.0 ft × 12.0 ft)

Design and construction
- Architect: Vedat Tek

The İzmit Clock Tower (Turkish: İzmit Saat Kulesi) in İzmit, Turkey is one of many clock towers that were built throughout the Ottoman Empire as a result of the decree which was sent to the provincial governors to commemorate the 25th anniversary of Sultan Abdülhamid II's ascension to the Ottoman throne. It was designed by architect Vedat Tek upon the order of Musa Kazım Bey, the governor of İzmit, and built in 1902. Other sources name the architect of the tower as Mihran Azaryan who was an Armenian-Ottoman of Izmit origin.

The neoclassical clock tower, which stands just in front of the Hünkar Pavilion of Sultan Abdülaziz, has four floors with dimensions 3.65 m × 3.65 m (12.0 ft × 12.0 ft). The ground floor houses fountains, while the clock is on the top floor. All four facades of the middle floors are decorated with the seal of Sultan Abdülhamid II. The pointed cone on top is coated with lead.

The clock tower has been an inseparable part of the history of İzmit throughout the 20th century, and has become the symbol of the city.

In the former Balkan provinces of the Ottoman Empire, particularly in present-day Serbian, Bosnian and Montenegrin towns such as Belgrade, Prijepolje, Sarajevo, Banja Luka, Gradačac and Stara Varoš, similar Ottoman era clock towers are still named Sahat Kula (deriving from the Turkish words Saat Kulesi, meaning Clock Tower.)

It was restored in 2006.

== See also ==
- Büyük Saat, Antalya
- Dolmabahçe Clock Tower, Istanbul
- Etfal Hospital Clock Tower, Istanbul
- İzmir Clock Tower, Izmir
- Nusretiye Clock Tower, Istanbul
- Yıldız Clock Tower, Istanbul
