= Mihran Azaryan =

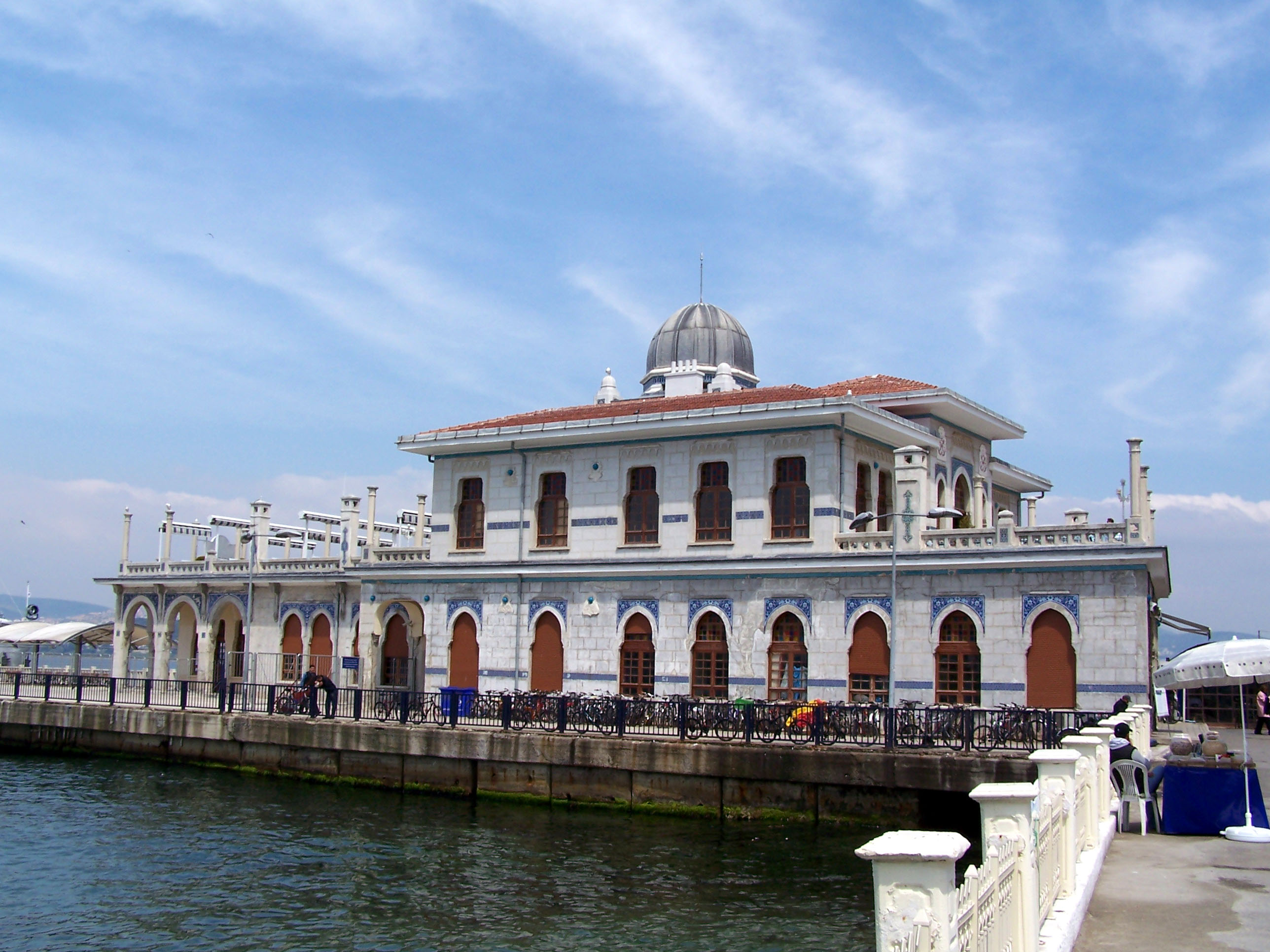
Büyükada Pier constructed by Mihran Azaryan

Mihran Azaryan (1876 in Izmit, Ottoman Empire – 1952 in Istanbul, Turkey) was an Ottoman Armenian and Turkish architect who is best known for having designed and constructed the Büyükada Pier and possibly the Izmit Clock Tower.
