= Raimondo D'Aronco =

Italian architect

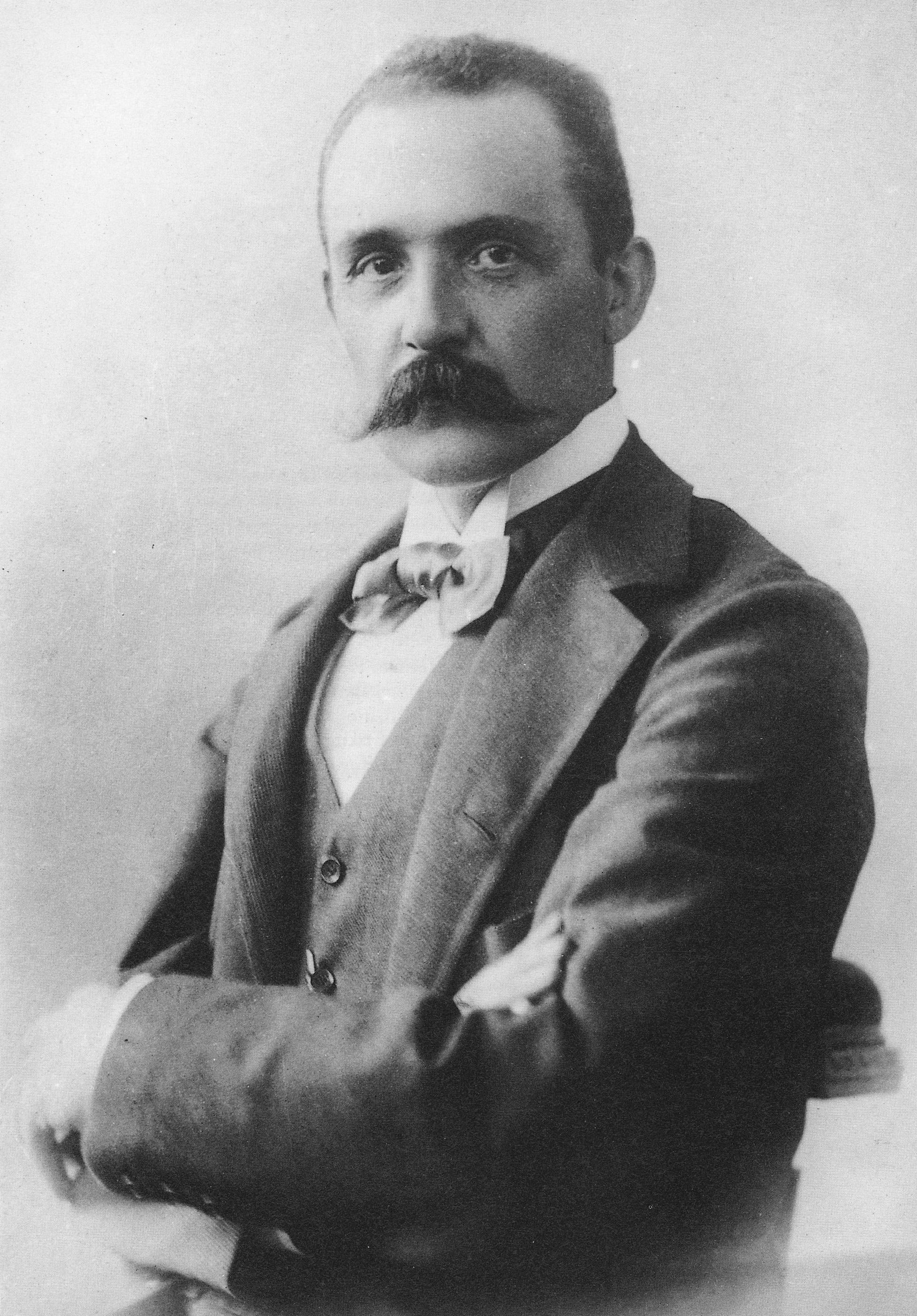
Raimondo D'Aronco

Raimondo Tommaso D’Aronco (1857–1932) was an Italian architect renowned for his building designs in the style of Art Nouveau. He was the chief palace architect to the Ottoman Sultan Abdülhamid II in Istanbul for 16 years.

== Early years ==
D’Aronco was born 1857 in the provincial town of Gemona del Friuli, Udine, Austrian Empire into a family of builders for several generations. He completed the Gemona Arts and Trades School after the primary school. Where he was born became part of the Kingdom of Italy in 1866, when he was about nine-years-old.

At the age of 14, D’Aronco attended the Johanneum Baukunde in Graz, Austria-Hungary in 1871, a school for construction famous for training skilled masons and joiners, which still exists today. Already knowledgeable after years of practical experience with his father, he proved an outstanding student, and his teachers urged him to study architecture. After his return to Italy with his resolve, D’Aronco enrolled at a summer school of design in Gemona, winning first prize in the competition, which he entered upon completing the second course.

D’Aronco then volunteered for military service and worked as a fortifications engineer in Turin, which gave him experience in timber construction. Upon discharge, he entered the Venice Academy of Fine Arts, Accademia di Belle Arti, where the teaching was not confined to any particular school of thought, enabling D’Aronco, whose ideas had not been shaped by any previous architectural education, to experiment freely with form and style. At the academy, the ideas of Camillo Boito were dominant in design classes, which taught him, how to combine existing environment with other sources. At the end of the year, when he was still only 19 years old and full of enthusiasm, he was awarded first prize for architectural composition.

== Career ==
Raimondo d’Aronco's rise to fame in Italy began with design competition for a monument to King Vittorio Emmanuele II to be built in Rome. His design won the silver medal. Similar achievements at the competitions for the 1887 Venice Exhibition, the First Turin Exhibition of Architecture in 1890 and the Palermo National Exhibition in 1891 made him one of Italy's most promising young architects.

In 1893, he was invited to Istanbul to prepare designs for the Istanbul Exhibition of Agriculture and Industry to be held in 1896. He arrived in August 1893, and had completed the project within a few months. Sultan Abdul Hamid II approved the designs, and the foundations were being laid when the great earthquake of 10 July 1894 devastated the city. One of its victims was the exhibition, which had to be scrapped.

But in the wake of the earthquake, the need for an architect of Raimondo d’Aronco's standing became even more urgent, as a rebuilding program got underway. He was first charged with restoring damaged monuments in the old city, and went on to design scores of buildings for the government and individuals.

The Istanbul period in his professional career only came to an end with the deposition of Sultan Abdülhamid II in 1909. These 16 years were to be the most productive years of his life, and represented the height of his originality.

== Major works ==
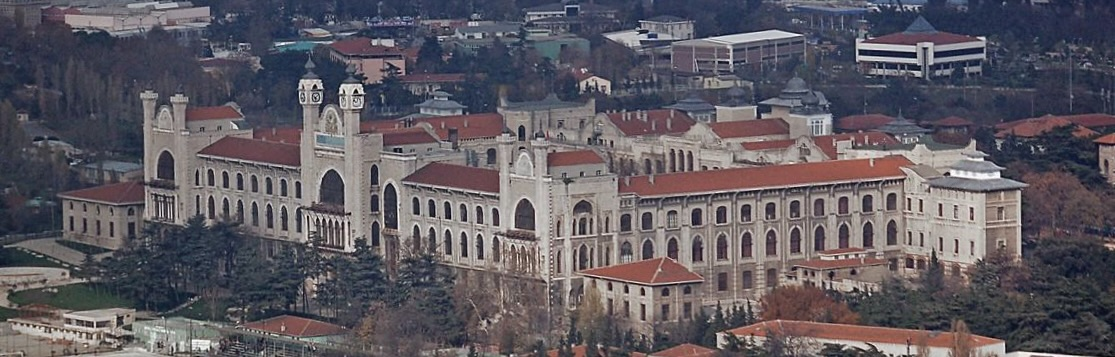
Marmara University Haydarpaşa Campus in Istanbul, which was originally built as the Imperial College of Medicine (Mekteb-i Tıbbiye-i Şahane) between 1895 and 1900. Raimondo D'Aronco collaborated with Alexander Vallaury for its design. The building later became the Haydarpaşa High School, before being transferred to Marmara University.

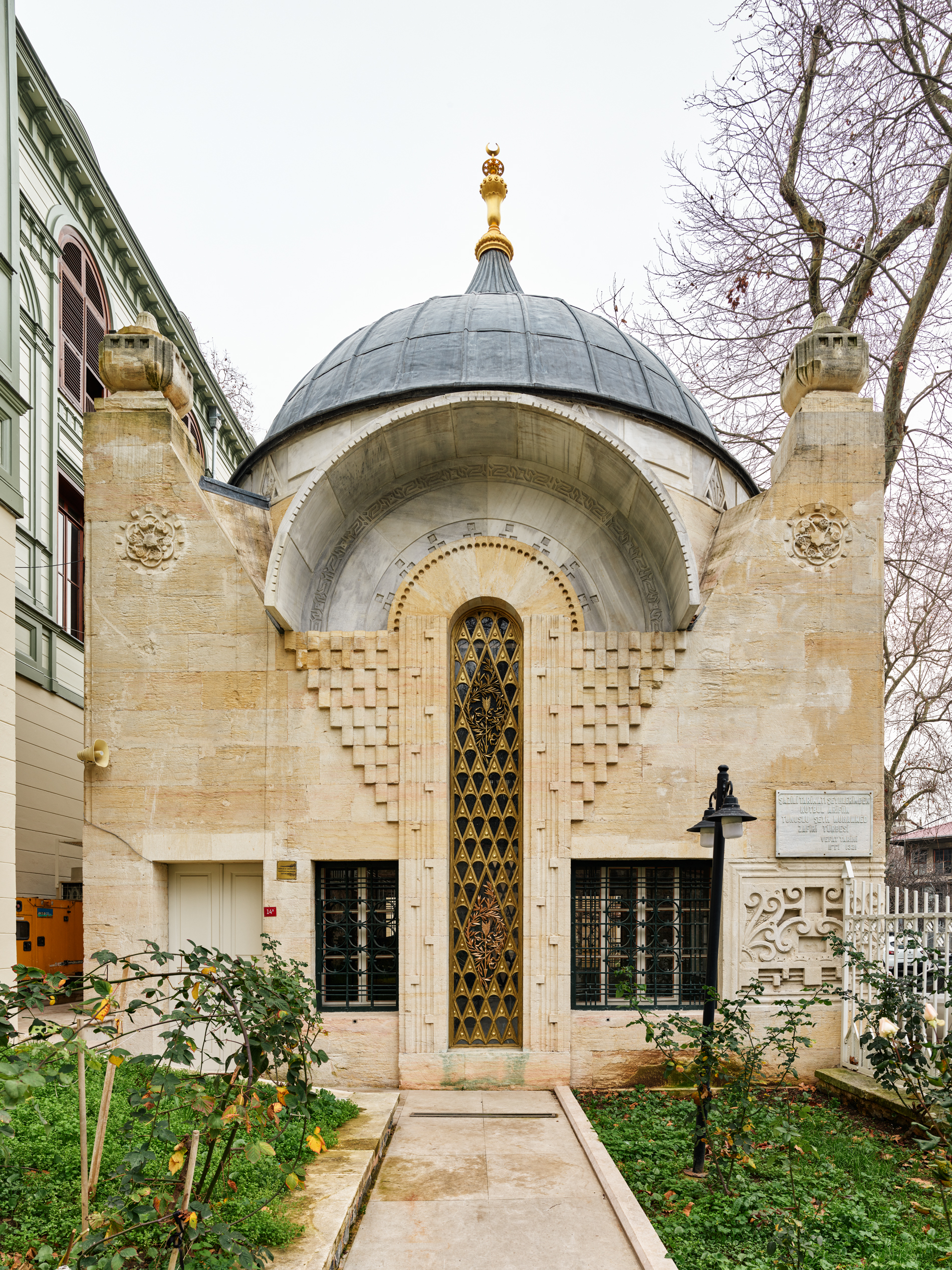
Türbe of Sheikh Zafir Efendi (Şeyh Zafir Efendi Türbesi) in the Yıldız quarter of Beşiktaş, Istanbul.

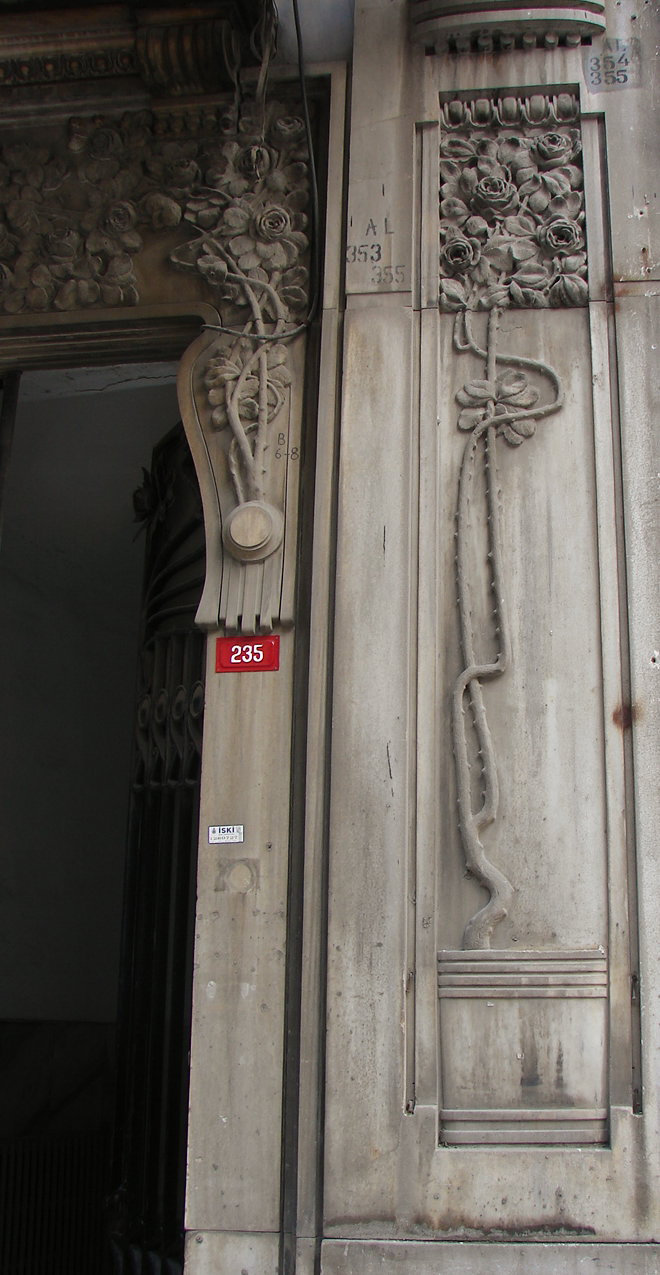
A floral front door detail in Casa Botter before conservation(Botter Apartmanı, 1900–1901) on İstiklal Avenue in Beyoğlu, Istanbul.

D'Aronco designed and built a large number of buildings of various types in Istanbul. The stylistic features of his works can be classified in three groups: Revivalism, reinterpretation of the Ottoman forms, Art Nouveau and Vienna Secession. Art Nouveau was first introduced to Istanbul by d'Aronco, and his designs reveal that he drew freely on Byzantine and Ottoman decoration for his inspiration. D'Aronco made creative use of the forms and motifs of Islamic architecture to create modern buildings for the city.

The buildings, which he designed at Yıldız Palace, were European in style. The best known of these are Yildiz Palace pavilions and the Yildiz Ceramic Factory (1893–1907), the Janissary Museum and the Ministry of Agriculture (1898), the fountain of Abdulhamit II (1901), Karakoy Mosque (1903), the mausoleum for the Tunisian religious leader Sheikh Zafir Efendi (1905–1906), tomb within the cemetery of Fatih Mosque (1905), Cemil Bey House at Kireçburnu (1905), clock tower for the Hamidiye-i Etfal Hospital (1906).

Casa Botter (Botter Apartmanı) (1900–1901), a seven-story workshop and residence building in İstiklâl Avenue in Beyoğlu, which he designed for the sultan's Dutch fashion tailor M. Jean Botter, represents a turning point in D’Aronco's architecture. This Art Nouveau design in the avant-garde mood of the period compounded D’Aronco's already enviable reputation. While living in Graz at fourteen, he had also found the chance to follow the Austrian Secession more closely than most of his compatriots.

Around the same time, he won the Turin International Exhibition of Decorative Arts design competition, which carried his fame into the international sphere. The tiny mescid (little mosque) of Merzifonlu Kara Mustafa Paşa, which stood in Karaköy until modernization projects swept it away in 1958, was another work of comparable note.

Among the numerous private houses, which Raimondo d’Aronco designed, is the Huber Mansion (1906) in Tarabya, built for the German weapon traders, Joseph and Baron Auguste Huber brothers of an aristocratic and wealthy family. Since 1985 the official Istanbul residence of the Turkish president.

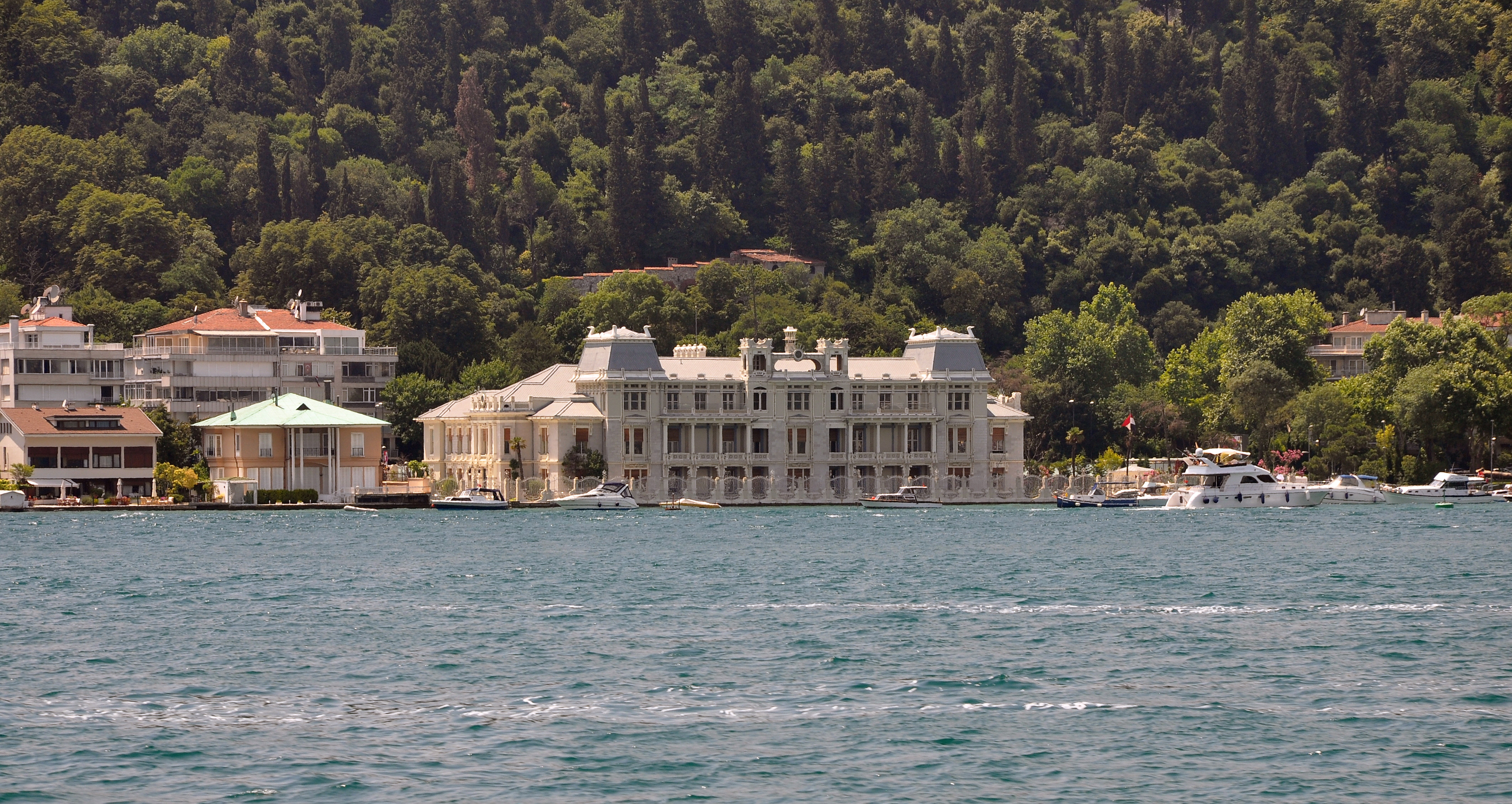
Âli Pasha Mansion (currently the Egyptian Consulate) in Bebek, Istanbul, on the Bosphorus strait.

He also built a palace for the sultan's daughter Nazime Sultan, but this is no longer standing. The summer residence for the Italian embassy (1905) in Tarabya is one of the most striking contributions to Istanbul's architectural heritage by D’Aronco. Planned as a classic Italian palace, the building opens directly onto the sea like a Bosphorus house, together with an Italian type interior space. Broad eaves typical of Istanbul vernacular architecture cast deep shade over the terrace. The skilled welding of two cultures testifies to both D’Aronco's interpretive skill and his affection for Istanbul.

The Esposizione Internazionale d'Arte Decorativa Moderna, the International Exposure of Turin, was held 1902 and featured many works in the Art Nouveau including the main exhibition building, or Rotunda, in a Secessionist style, as well as the pavilion devoted to art photography designed by D’Aronco. He presented also a project for the building of the Regional Exposure of Udine of 1903.

In the region of his hometown, there are still many of his works, including the Neo-Gothic main cemetery in Cividale (1889), the family tomb in Udine (1898) and the Town Hall in Udine (1911–1930).

Raimondo D’Aronco died 1932 in Sanremo, Imperia in Italy. A state institute in Gemona, ISIS Istituto Statale di Istruzione Superiore, is named after him. Part of the credit for the rediscovery of D'Aronco's work is attributed to the Italian architect Manfredi Nicoletti who in 1955 wrote the very first biography on his Art Nouveau drawings and architectures.

== See also ==
- Yıldız Palace
