= Yıldız Hamidiye Mosque =

Mosque in Beşiktaş, Istanbul, Turkey

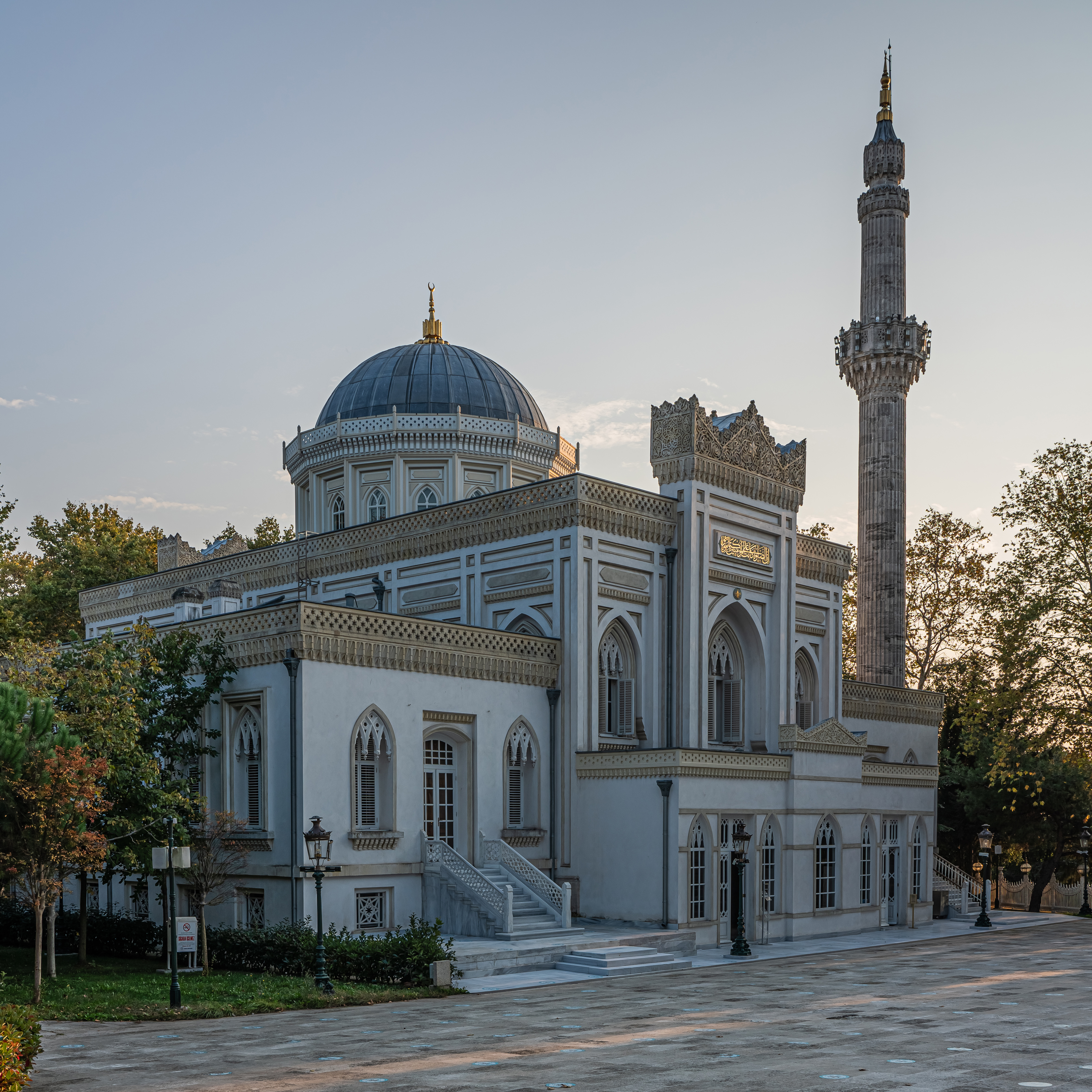

Religion
- Affiliation: Islam

Location
- Location: Istanbul, Turkey
- Interactive map of Yıldız Hamidiye Mosque
- Coordinates: 41°02′57.88″N 29°00′35.77″E

Architecture
- Architect: Sarkis Balyan
- Type: Mosque
- Style: Ottoman architecture
- Groundbreaking: 1884
- Completed: 1886
- Minaret: 1

The Yıldız Hamidiye Mosque (Turkish: Yıldız Hamidiye Camii), also called the Yıldız Mosque (Turkish: Yıldız Camii), is an Ottoman imperial mosque located in Yıldız neighbourhood of Beşiktaş district in Istanbul, Turkey, on the way to Yıldız Palace. The mosque was commissioned by the Ottoman sultan Abdul Hamid II, and constructed between 1884 and 1886. The mosque was built on a rectangular plan and has one minaret. The architecture of the mosque is a combination of Neo-Gothic style and classical Ottoman motifs. A bronze colonnade erected by Abdul Hamid II in Marjeh Square of Damascus, Syria bears a replica statue of the Yıldız Mosque on top.

On 4 August 2017, the mosque was reopened by President Recep Tayyip Erdogan after 4 years of restoration work that cost 27 million Turkish liras ($7.6 million).

== Assassination attempt of Abdul Hamid II ==
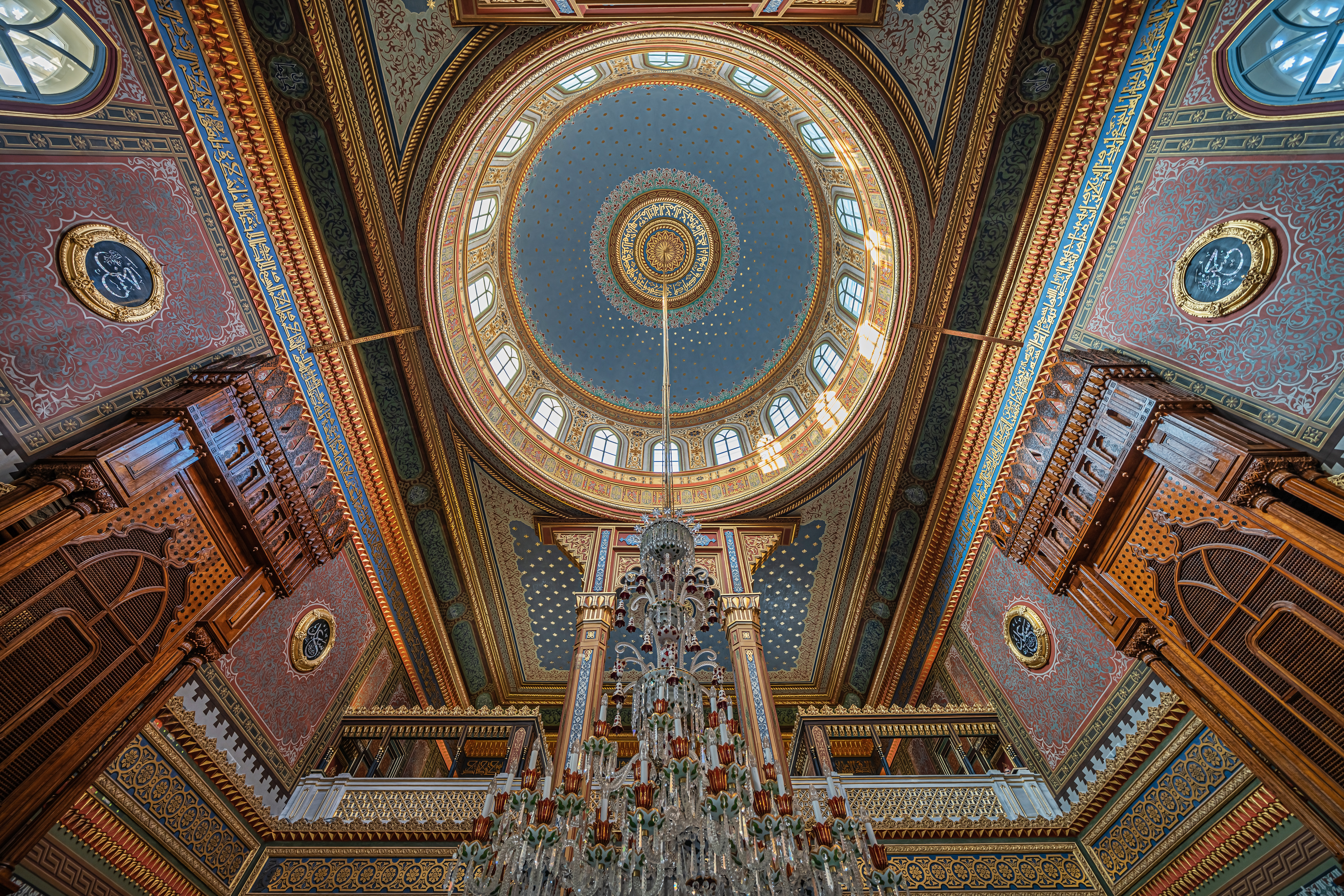
Interior of the dome

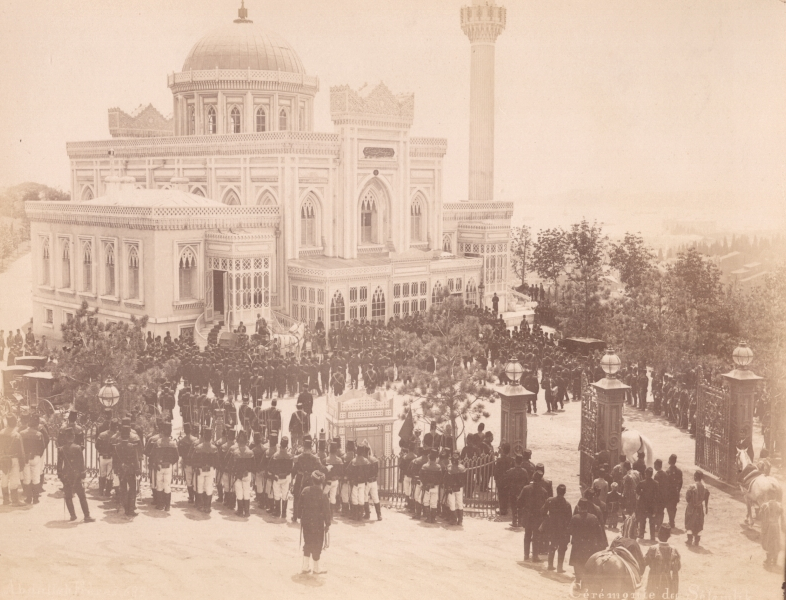
Yıldız Hamidiye mosque during an Ottoman state ceremony in the late 19th century.

On 21 July 1905, members of the Armenian Revolutionary Federation attempted to assassinate Abdul Hamid II by placing a horse carriage bomb in front of the mosque, an event known as the Yıldız assassination attempt. Although the bomb failed to kill the sultan due to an unforeseen delay, it killed 26 others and wounded 58 more. The attempt was in response to the pogroms and massacres against Armenians and other minorities of the Ottoman Empire carried out by Abdul Hamid II's government, the Hamidian massacres.

== See also ==
- Yıldız assassination attempt
- Yıldız Palace
- Yıldız Clock Tower
- List of mosques
- Ottoman architecture
