= Dolmabahçe Clock Tower =

Clock tower in Istanbul, Turkey

- Dolmabahçe Saat Kulesi
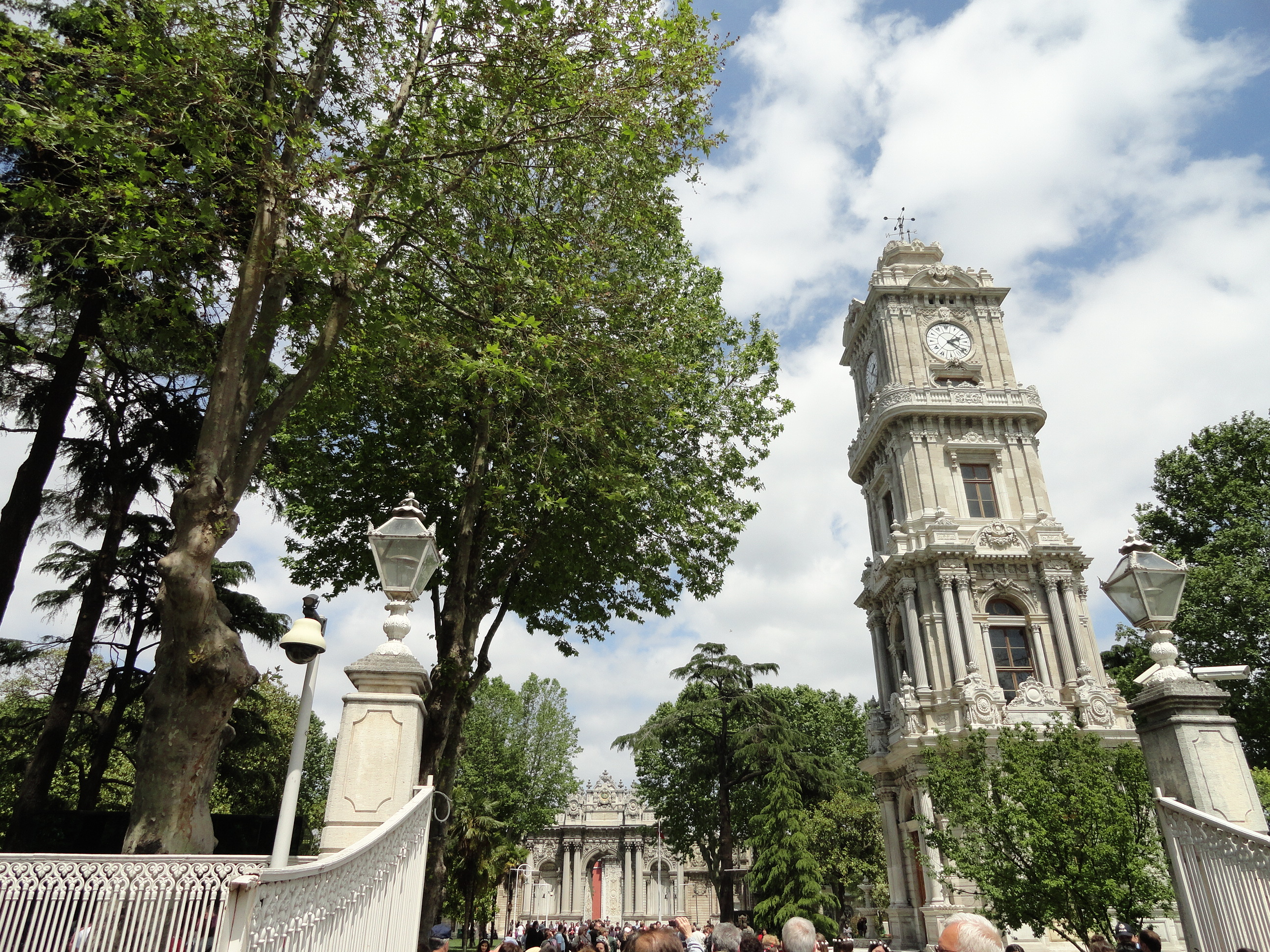
- Interactive map of the Dolmabahçe Clock Tower area

General information
- Type: Clock tower
- Architectural style: Ottoman Neo-baroque
- Location: Istanbul, Turkey, Dolmabahçe Palace, Dolmabahçe Caddesi
- Coordinates: 41°02′15.39″N 28°59′47.17″E
- Construction started: 1890
- Completed: 1895

Height
- Height: 27 m (89 ft)

Technical details
- Floor count: 4
- Floor area: 72.25 m^{2} (777.7 sq ft)

Design and construction
- Architect: Sarkis Balyan

Dolmabahçe Clock Tower (Turkish: Dolmabahçe Saat Kulesi) is a clock tower situated outside Dolmabahçe Palace in Istanbul, Turkey. Its construction was ordered by Ottoman sultan Abdülhamid II (1842–1918) and designed by the court architect Sarkis Balyan between 1890 and 1895.

The clock tower was added to Dolmabahçe Palace, and stands in front of its Treasury Gate on a square along the European waterfront of Bosphorus next to Dolmabahçe Mosque. Designed in Ottoman neo-baroque style, the four-sided, four-story tower stands on a floor area of 8.5 × 8.5 m (28 × 28 ft) at a height of 27 m (89 ft). Its clock was manufactured by the renowned French clockmaker house of Jean-Paul Garnier, and installed by the court clock master Johann Mayer. Its face features highly stylised Eastern Arabic numerals. In 1979, the original mechanical clock was converted partly to an electrical one. Two opposing sides of the tower bear the tughra of Sultan Abdul Hamid II.

== See also ==
- List of columns and towers in Istanbul
- Yıldız Clock Tower
- Etfal Hospital Clock Tower
- İzmir Clock Tower
- İzmit Clock Tower
