= Etfal Hospital Clock Tower =

- Etfal Hastanesi Saat Kulesi
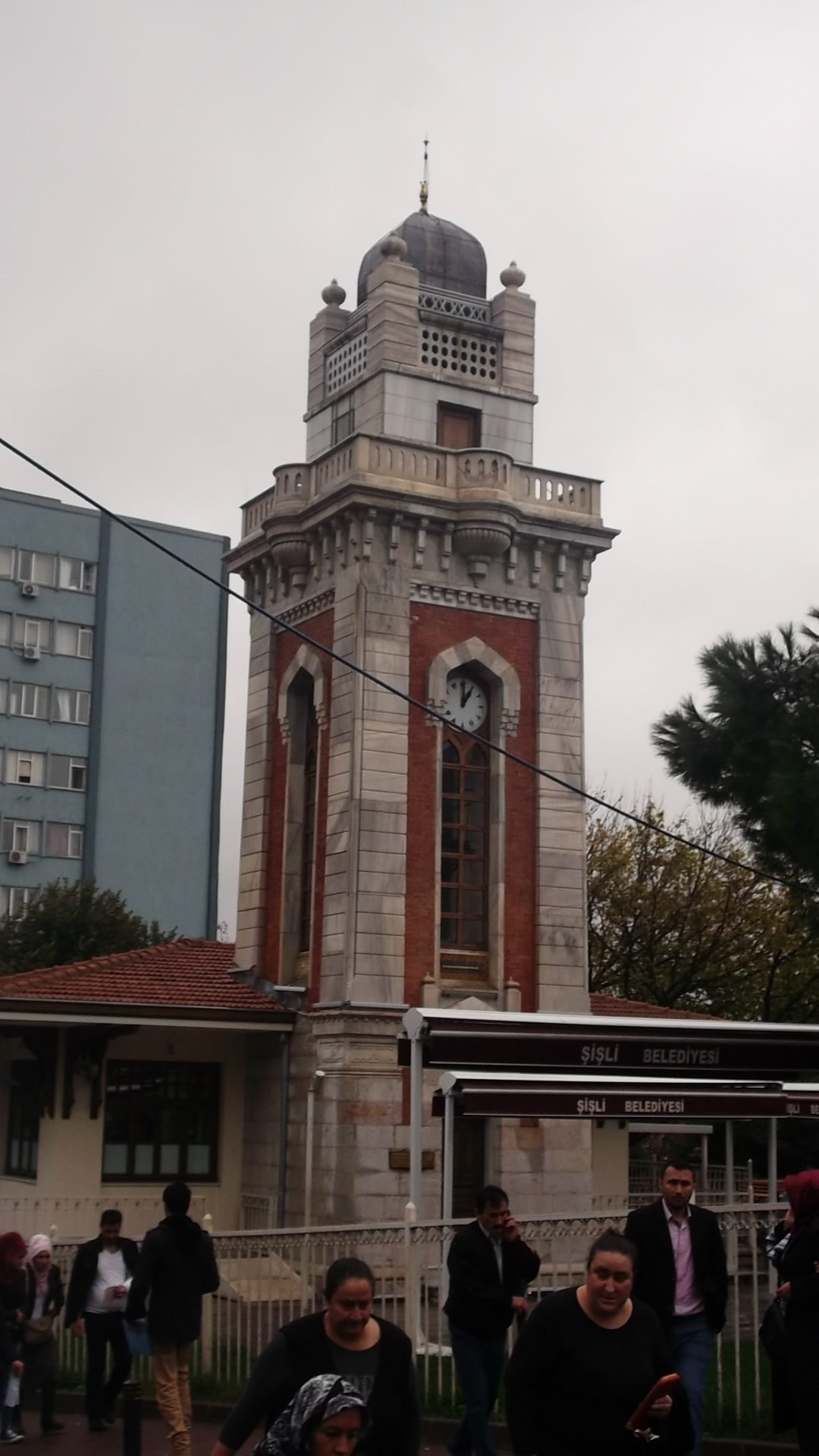
- Interactive map of the Etfal Hospital Clock Tower area

General information
- Type: Clock tower
- Architectural style: Ottoman architecture
- Location: Istanbul, Turkey, Şişli Etfal Hospital
- Coordinates: 41°03′28.44″N 28°59′24.00″E

Height
- Height: 20 m (66 ft)

Design and construction
- Architect: Mehmet Şükrü Bey

Etfal Hospital Clock Tower, or Children's Hospital Clock Tower (Turkish: Etfal Hastanesi Saat Kulesi), is a clock tower situated in the garden of the Hamidiye Etfal Hospital (now Şişli Etfal Hospital) in the Şişli district of Istanbul, Turkey at the European side of Bosphorus. It was ordered by the Ottoman sultan Abdülhamid II (reigned 1876–1909), and constructed by the architect Mehmet Şükrü Bey.

The 20 m (66 ft) tall structure is made of marble and fine Hereke stone. On the front face, the tughra of Sultan Abdülhamid II is put on.

== See also ==
- List of columns and towers in Istanbul
- Dolmabahçe Clock Tower
- Yıldız Clock Tower
- İzmir Clock Tower
- İzmit Clock Tower
