= Yıldız Clock Tower =

Coordinates: 41.0498°N 29.0098°E

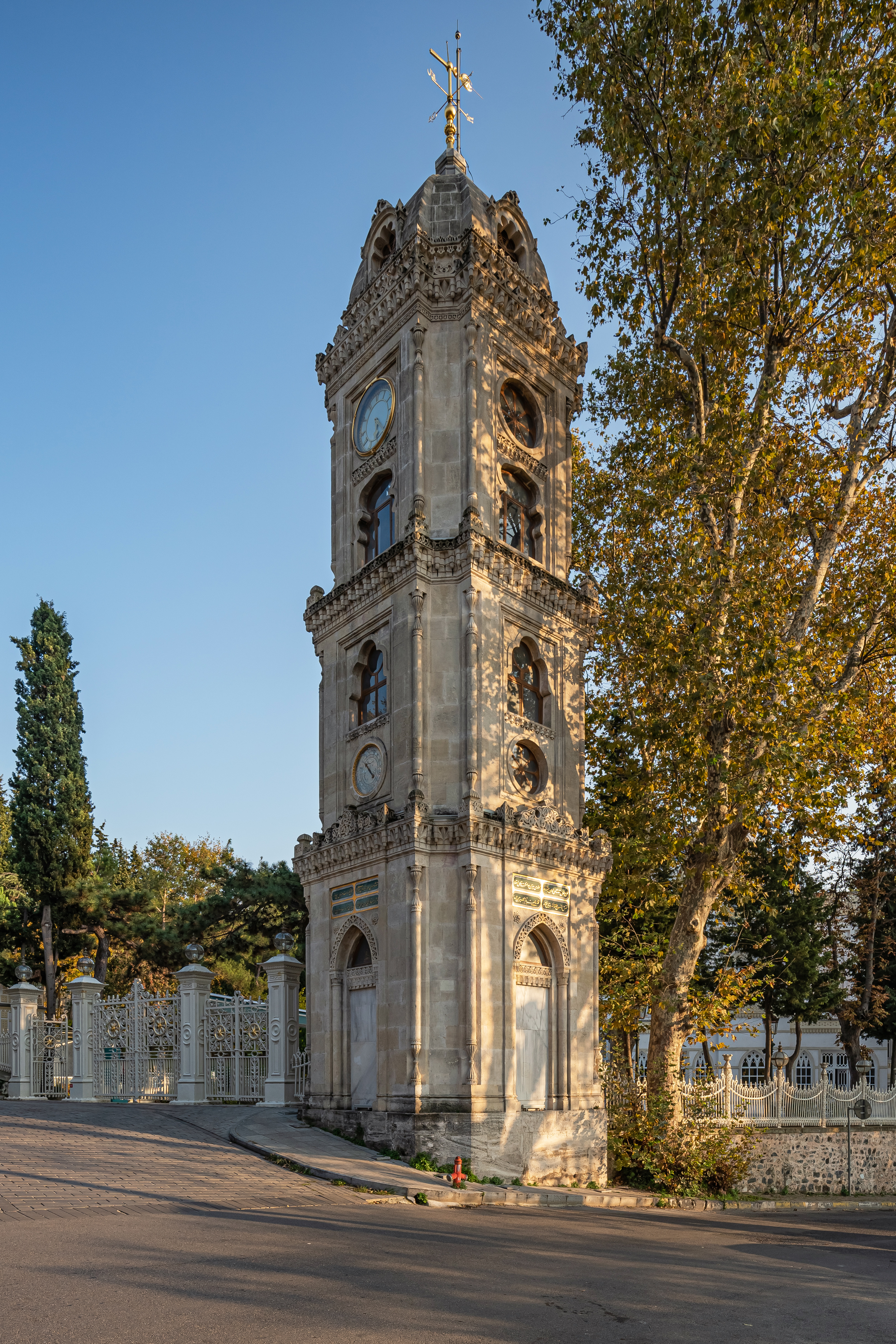
Yıldız Clock Tower.

Yıldız Clock Tower (Turkish: Yıldız Saat Kulesi), is a clock tower situated next to the courtyard of the Yıldız Hamidiye Mosque, in Yıldız neighborhood of Beşiktaş district in Istanbul, Turkey at the European side of Bosphorus.

== History ==
The tower was ordered by the Ottoman Sultan Abdülhamid II (1842–1918) in 1889, and the construction completed in 1890.

== Structure ==
The three-story structure in Ottoman and neo-Gothic style has an octagonal plan. Outside the first floor, there are four inscriptions, the second floor contains a thermometer and a barometer, and the top floor is the clock room. The clock was repaired in 1993. Atop the decorative roof, a compass rose is found.

== See also ==
- Yıldız Palace
- Yıldız Hamidiye Mosque
- List of columns and towers in Istanbul
- Dolmabahçe Clock Tower
- Etfal Hospital Clock Tower
- İzmir Clock Tower
- İzmit Clock Tower
