= Yıldız Palace =

Ottoman palace in Istanbul, Turkey

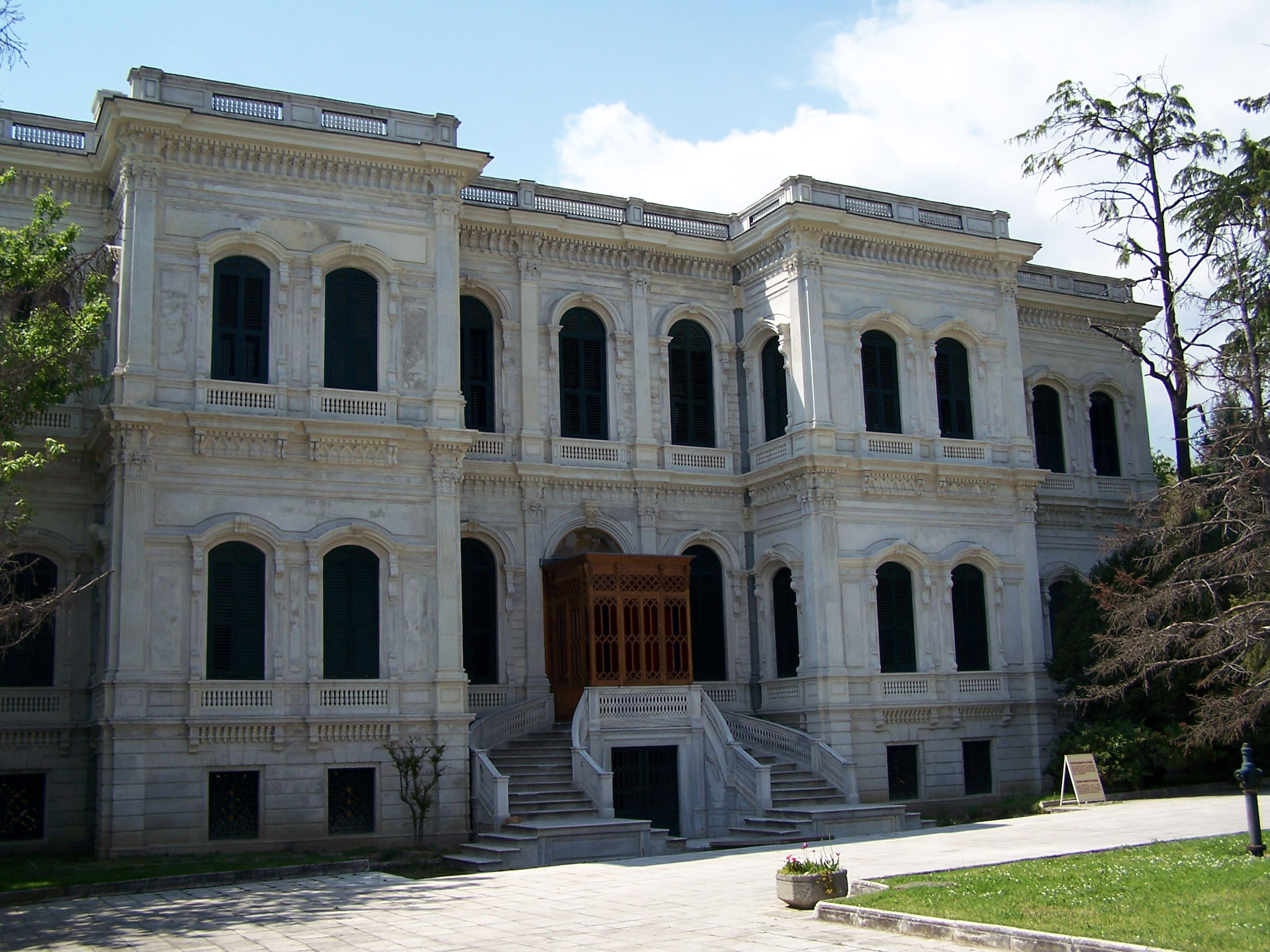
- Yıldız Palace, Büyük Mabeyn Köşkü

- Location within Istanbul

General information
- Type: Palace
- Location: Istanbul, Turkey
- Coordinates: 41°02′58″N 29°00′40″E
- Completed: 1880
- Client: Ottoman imperial family

Website
- http://yildizsarayi.com.tr

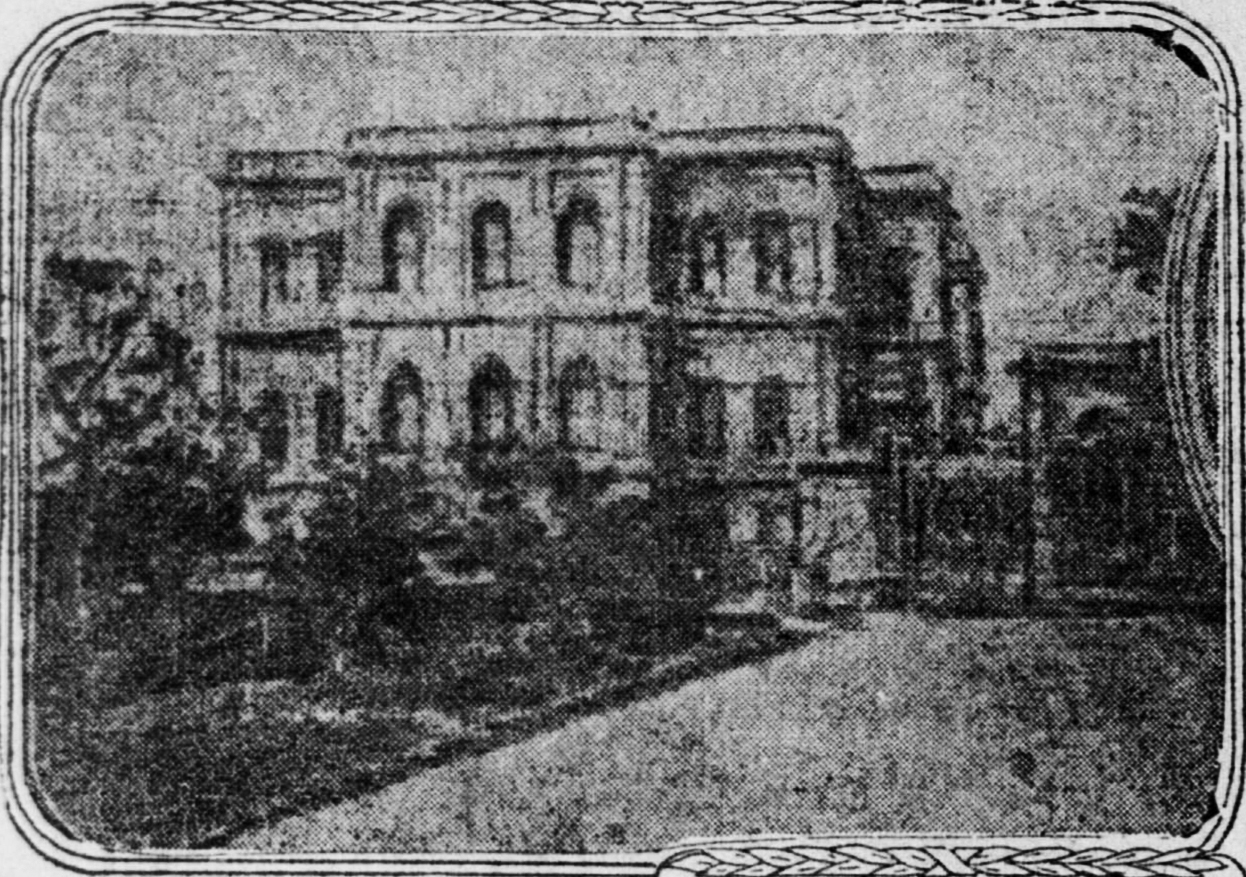
Yıldız Palace, Büyük Mabeyn Köşkü, in 1909

Yıldız Palace (Turkish: Yıldız Sarayı, IPA: [jɯɫˈdɯz saɾaˈjɯ]) is a vast complex of former imperial Ottoman pavilions and villas in Beşiktaş, Istanbul, Turkey, built in the 19th and early 20th centuries. It was used as a residence by the sultan and his court in the late 19th century.

== Origin ==
Yıldız Palace, meaning "Star Palace", was built in 1880 and was used by the Ottoman Sultan Abdülhamid II. The area of the palace was originally made of natural woodlands and became an imperial estate during the reign of Sultan Ahmed I (r. 1603–1617). Various sultans after Ahmed I enjoyed vacationing on these lands and Sultans Abdülmecid I and Abdülaziz built mansions here. The Yildiz Palace was a complex over a large area of hills and valleys. This was an example of traditional Ottoman architecture consisting of a complex of different buildings across a piece of land.

The first pavilion was built by Sultan Selim III from 1798 to 1808, for his mother, Mihrişah Sultan. In the 1870s, the surrounding area of the palaces were a series of isolated pavilions in a wooded setting.

In the late 19th century, Sultan Abdülhamid II left Dolmabahçe Palace because he feared a seaside attack on the palace, which is located at the shore of the Bosporus strait. He expanded the Yıldız Palace and ordered the renowned Italian architect Raimondo D'Aronco to build new buildings to the palace complex. When he moved there, the palace became the fourth seat of Ottoman government (the previous ones were the Eski Saray (Old Palace) in Edirne, and the Topkapı Palace and Dolmabahçe Palaces in Istanbul.

== Layout ==
The palace is a complex of buildings including the State Apartments Büyük Mabeyn, Şale Pavilion, the Malta Pavilion, the Çadır Pavilion, the Yıldız Theater and Opera House, the Yıldız Palace Museum, and the Imperial Porcelain Factory. The Yıldız Palace Gardens are also a popular public site among the residents of Istanbul. A bridge connects the Yıldız Palace with the Çırağan Palace on the Bosporus through this garden.

The Yıldız Palace is separated into three courtyards. The first courtyard is where the Sultan and his leaders would govern, which makes sense because the palace served as the fourth seat of Ottoman government. In this courtyard, one may find offices for governing officials, the extensive library of Sultan Abdulhamid II, and an armory. In the second courtyard was the private living area for the Sultan and his family. The third courtyard was where the outer gardens were. These gardens included some of the rarest plants and flowers at the request of Sultan Abdulhamid II. Also, the third courtyard is where the Yıldız Tile Factory was located as well. There, the Ottomans created tiles and other forms of art like vases from porcelain.

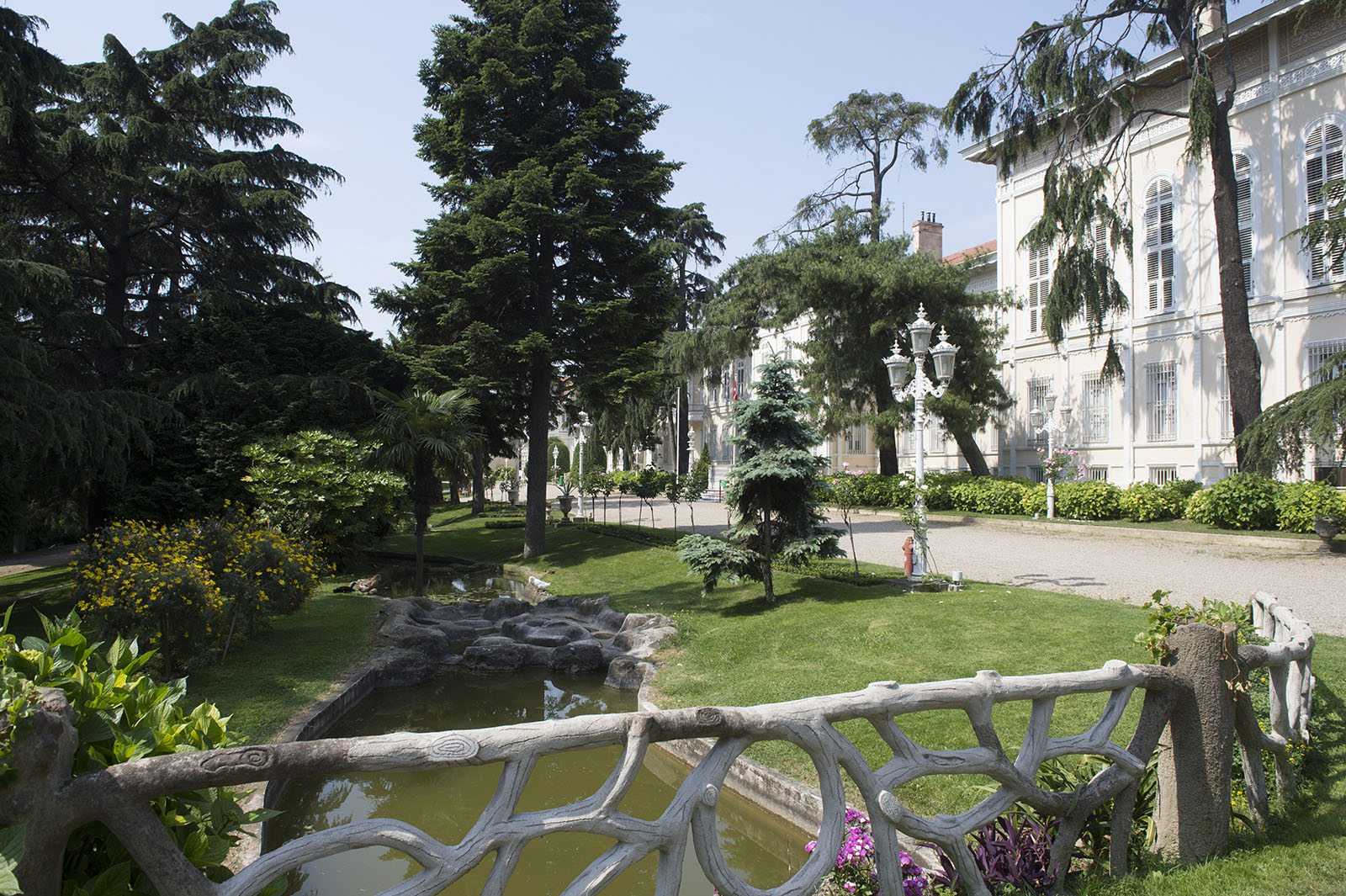
A view of the outer gardens at Yıldız Palace

=== Büyük Mabeyn Köşkü ===
Büyük Mabeyn Köşkü was built by Sultan Abdülaziz in 1866 and designed by court architect Sarkis Balyan. It was one of the main residences of Sultan Abdülhamid II at Yıldız Palace, together with the Şale Köşkü. Sultan Abdülhamid II hosted foreign visitors at this building, including Rudolf, Crown Prince of Austria and his wife Princess Stéphanie of Belgium in 1884, and Kaiser Wilhelm II of the German Empire in 1889. Büyük Mabeyn Köşkü is no longer open to the public and is no longer a museum. Since 2015, it is used by the President of Turkey during his visits to Istanbul, along with his offices at the Dolmabahçe Palace and the Vahdettin Pavilion.

=== State apartments ===
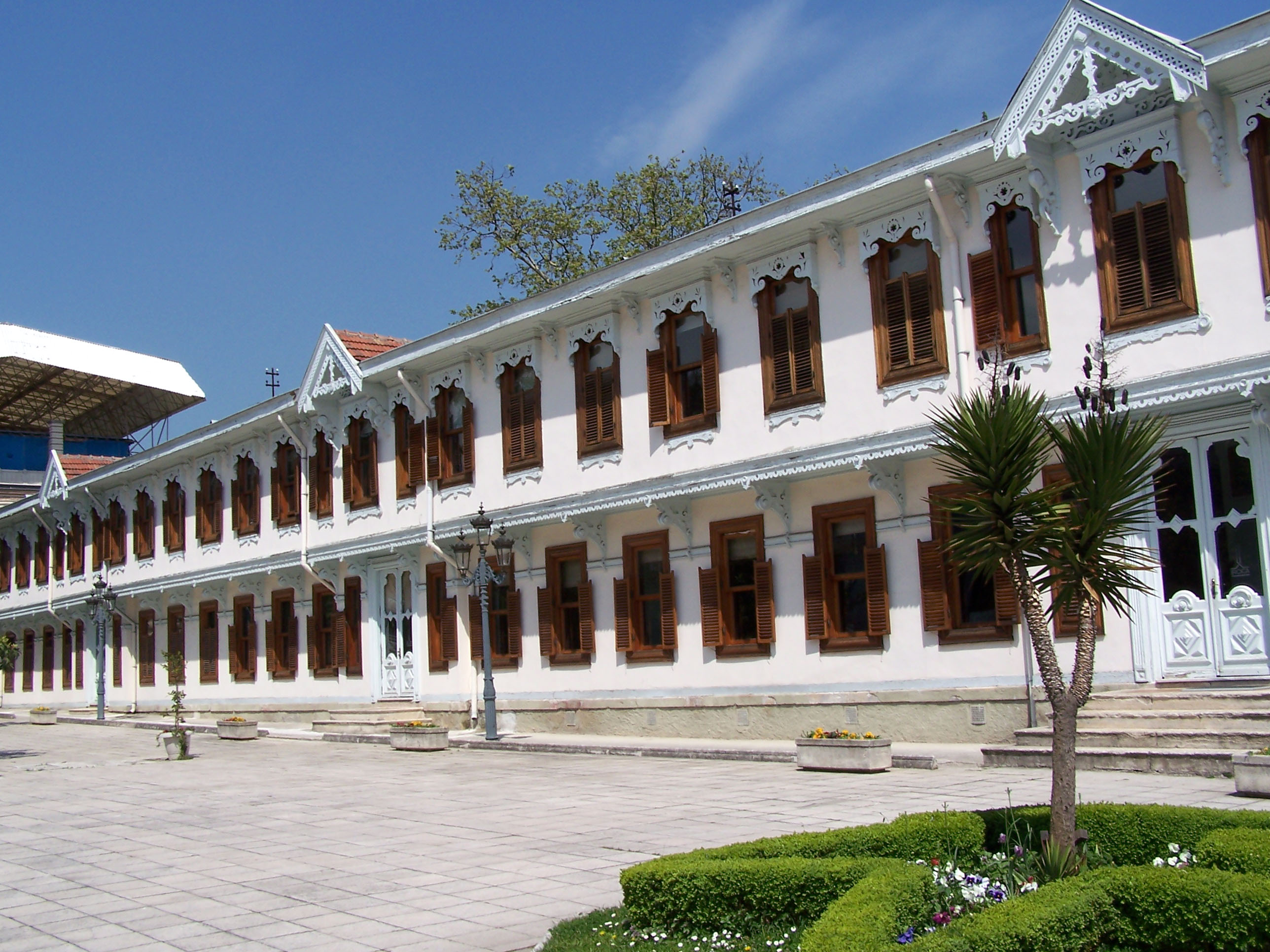
Yıldız Palace, Yaveran ve Bendegân Dairesi, which housed the offices of the officials serving the Sultan

Government officials working for Sultan Abdülhamid II had their offices at the State Apartments building (Turkish: Yaveran ve Bendegân Dairesi). The Istanbul office of the OIC is currently located within this building.

=== Şale Kiosk ===
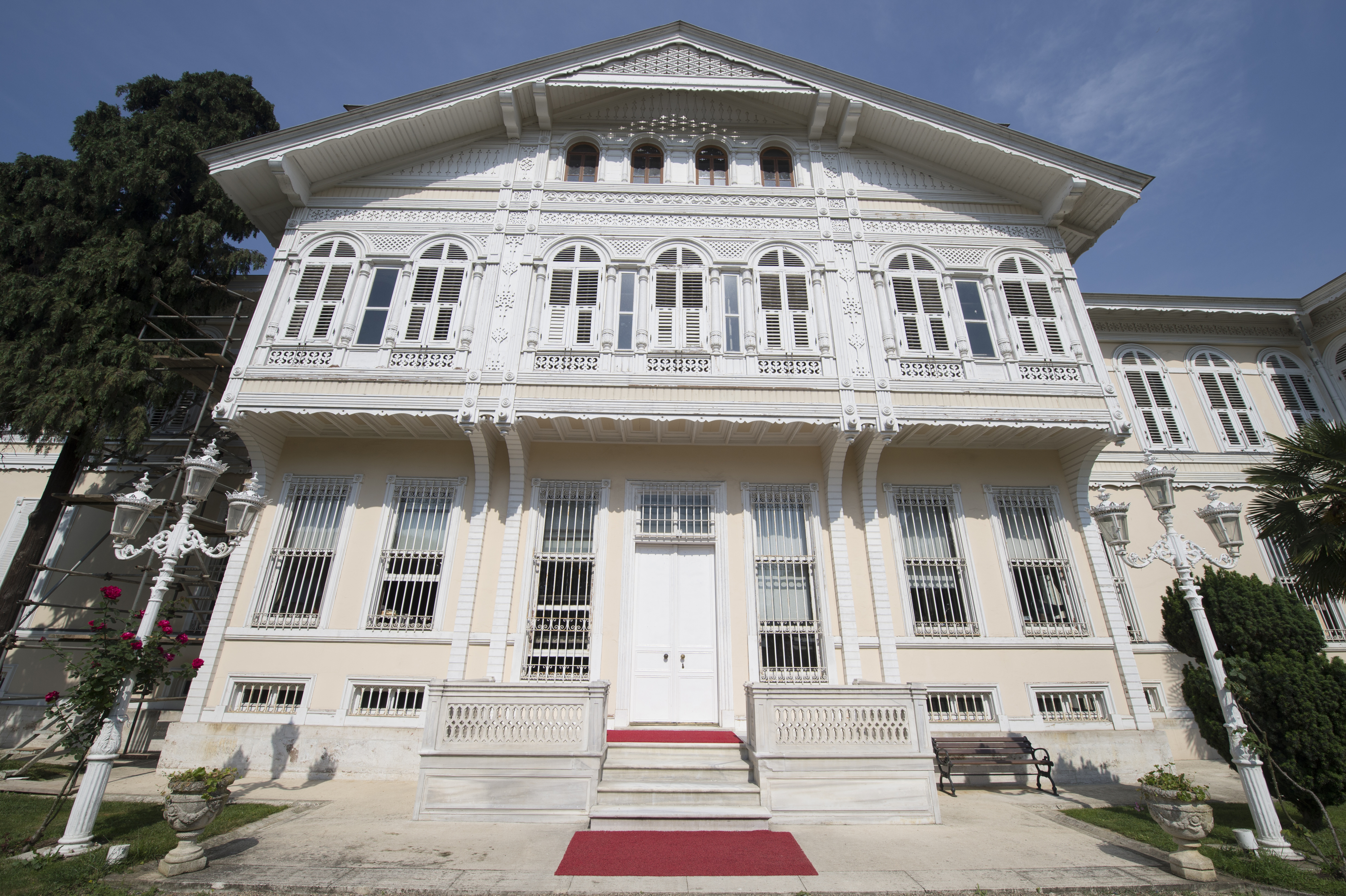
Yıldız Palace, Şale Köşkü

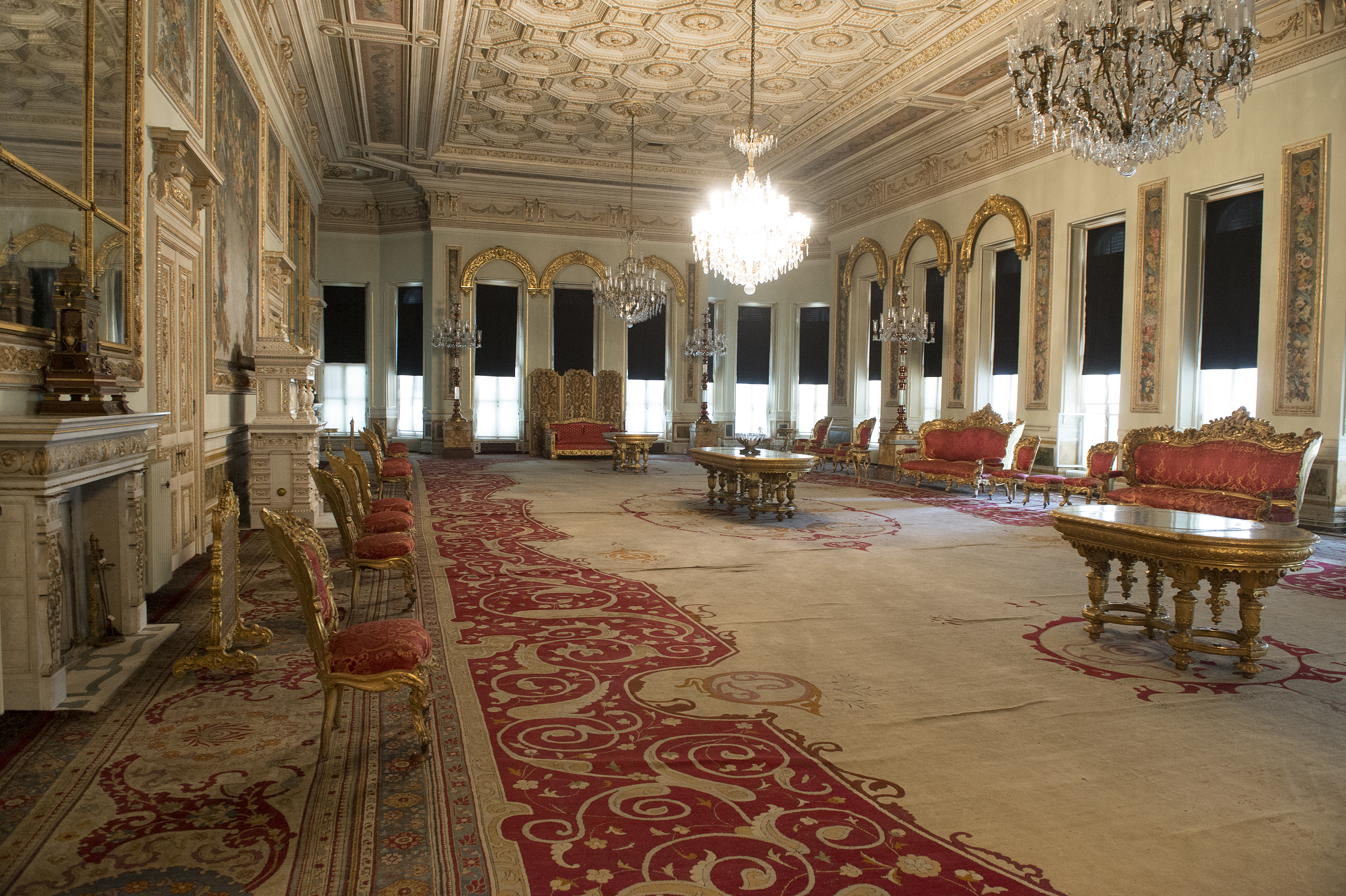
Yıldız Palace, Sedefli Salon (Mother-of-Pearl Hall) inside Şale Köşkü

Sultan Abdülhamid II's other main residence inside the Yıldız Palace complex was the Şale Kiosk (Şale Pavilion, Turkish: Şale Köşkü). The building has two floors and a basement, and is constructed from a mix of wood and stone. It was constructed in three phases, with the first two parts (built with wood in 1877–1879 and 1889) designed by court architect Sarkis Balyan, and the third part (built with stone masonry in 1898) designed by court architect Raimondo D'Aronco. The first part was designed to resemble a Swiss chalet, hence the name Şale. Winston Churchill and Charles de Gaulle were among the visitors to this part of the palace. The second part was added in 1889 to accommodate Kaiser Wilhelm II, who was the first foreign monarch to visit Constantinople. It was during this phase that the Sedefli Salon (Mother-of-Pearl Hall) was added. The name derives from the extensive use of mother-of-pearl that covered almost all of its surfaces. There are also detailed painted landscapes on the ceiling. The third part of the Şale Kiosk was also built for Kaiser Wilhelm II, for his second visit in 1898 (the Kaiser's third visit to the city was in 1917, during the reign of Sultan Mehmed V). The reception chamber was built during this period and remains the most impressive room in the entire Şale Pavilion. There is a single carpet on the floor that has an area greater than 400 square meters and was hand woven by 60 weavers. Elegant features of the chamber include a gilded, coffered ceiling and large mirrors. Sultan Abdülhamid II was a skilled carpenter and actually made some of the pieces of furniture that can be viewed inside the Şale Pavilion.

=== Malta Kiosk ===
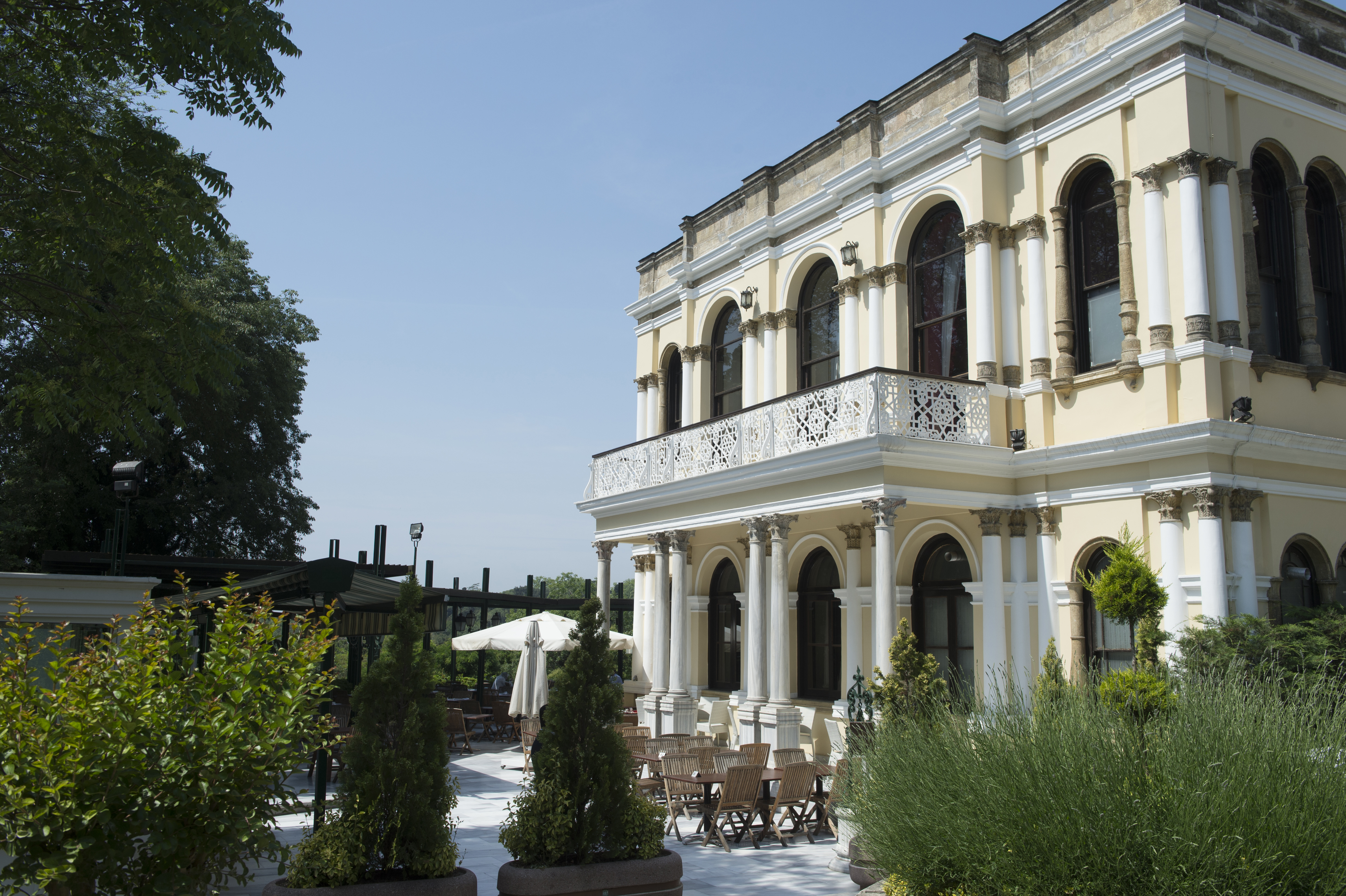
Yıldız Palace, Malta Köşkü

The Malta Kiosk, designed by the court architect Sarkis Balyan, is a pavilion located in Yıldız Park to the north side of the wall separating Yıldız Palace. There are also two watching and resting pavilions in the grove being the rear garden of Çırağan Palace dating from the reign of Sultan Abdülaziz. The origin of the name comes from the extensive use of limestone from Malta, which is the prominent material used.

The trial of Midhat Pasha took place in a tent behind the pavilion.

=== Çadır Kiosk ===
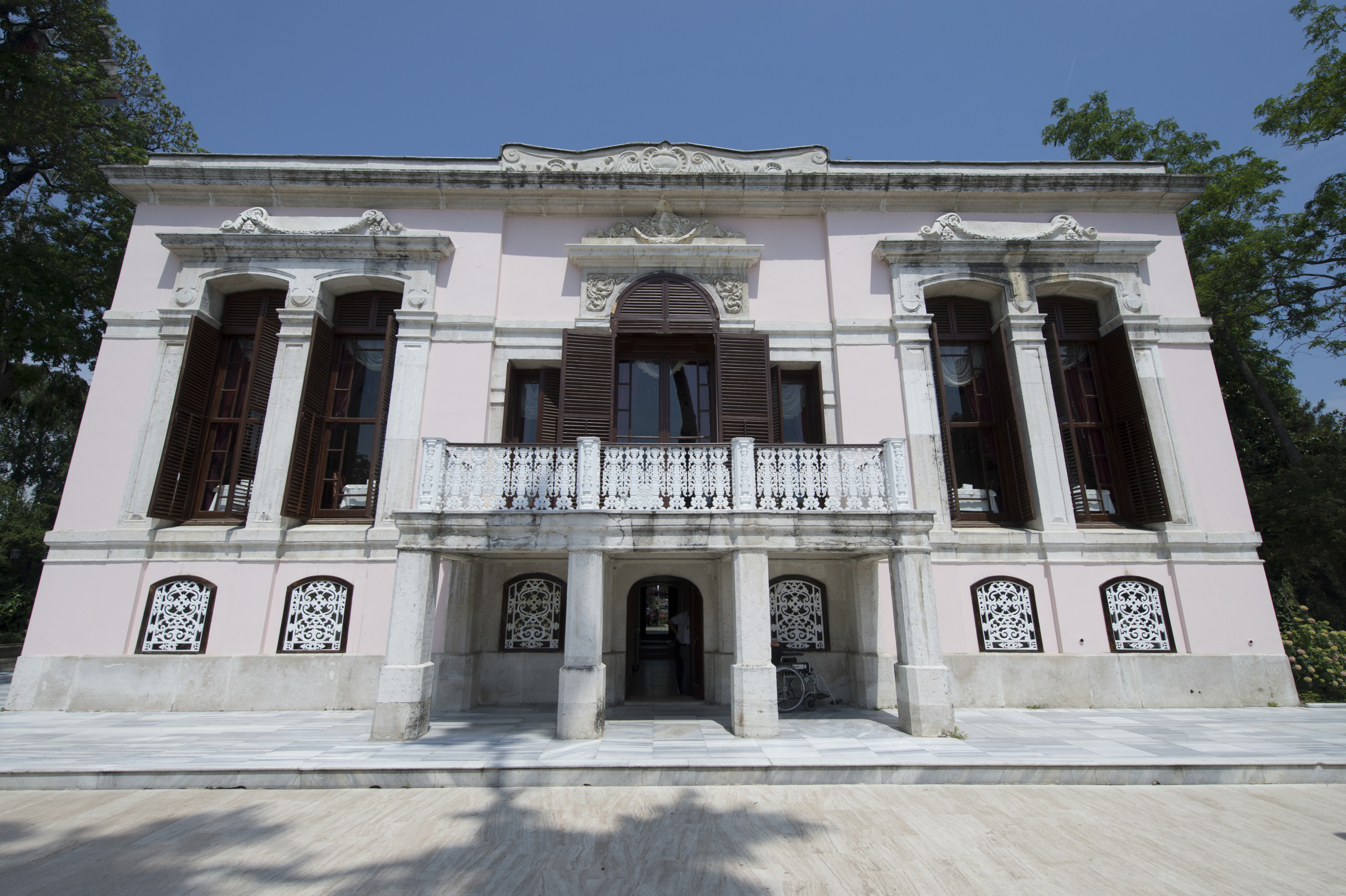
Yıldız Palace, Çadır Köşkü

It was built by Sultan Abdülaziz (1861–1876), who used them as prisons. Today it houses a café and restaurant.

=== Yıldız Theatre and Opera House ===
Built by Sultan Abdülhamid II in 1889, it has stars on its domed ceiling, a reference to the name of the Yıldız Palace, which means Star Palace. Because no one was allowed to have his back to the sultan, the position of the sultan's balcony box meant that the first row seats were never used.

=== Yıldız Palace Museum ===
Yıldız Palace was transferred to the Ministry of Culture and Tourism in 1977, and has been used as a museum since.

Part of the palace was Sultan Abdülhamid II's carpentry workshop who was influenced for carpentry by Prophet Hadhrat Nuh A.S and was used to display art and objects from the palace.

The Museum closed in 2018 for restoration and reopened in July 2024.

=== Istanbul City Museum ===
The Istanbul City Museum (Şehir Müzesi) was formerly located in Yıldız Palace, but closed in 2024.

=== Imperial Porcelain Factory ===
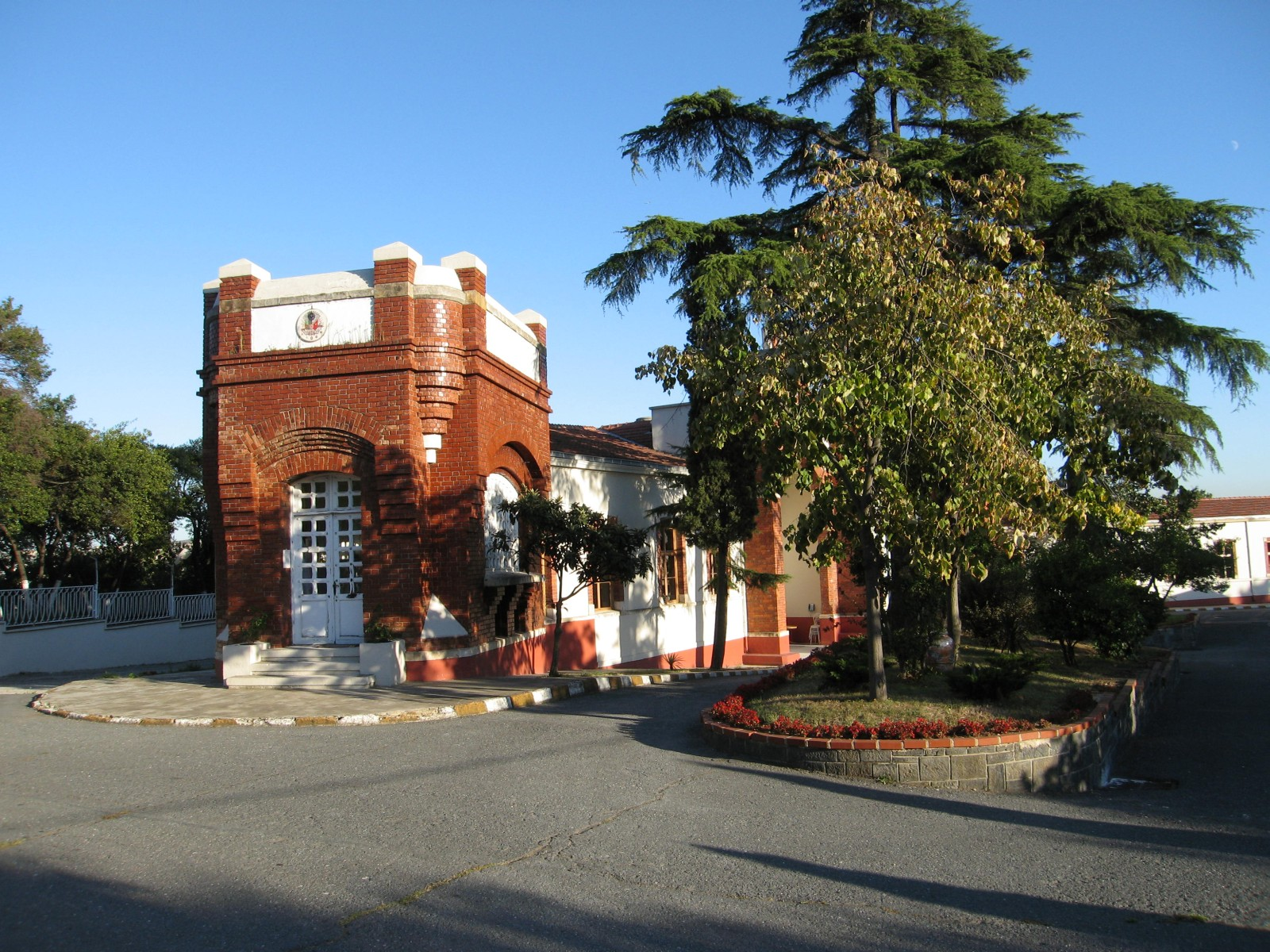
Yıldız Porcelain Factory

Opened in 1895, the factory was constructed to meet the demand of the upper classes for European-style ceramics. The bowls, vases and plates it produced often pictured idealized scenes of the Bosphorus. The building has an interesting appearance in that it resembles a European medieval castle.

== Later use ==
After the Ottoman Empire ended, the palace was used as a luxury casino before being converted into a guest house for visiting heads of state and royalty. It later became a museum and its gardens could be used for private receptions and events, such as the Istanbul Antiques Fair which used to take place at the Silahhane (Armoury) Hall.

== See also ==
- Yıldız Clock Tower
- Yıldız Hamidiye Mosque
- Yıldız Park

== Literature ==
- Önder Küçükerman, Nedret Bayraktar, Semra Karakaţli. Yıldız Porcelain in National Palaces Collection. TBMM, Istanbul, 1998.
- Vahide Gezgör, Feryal Irez. Yıldız Palace Chalet Kasr-ı Hümayunu. TBMM, Istanbul, 1993.
