= Architecture of Turkey =

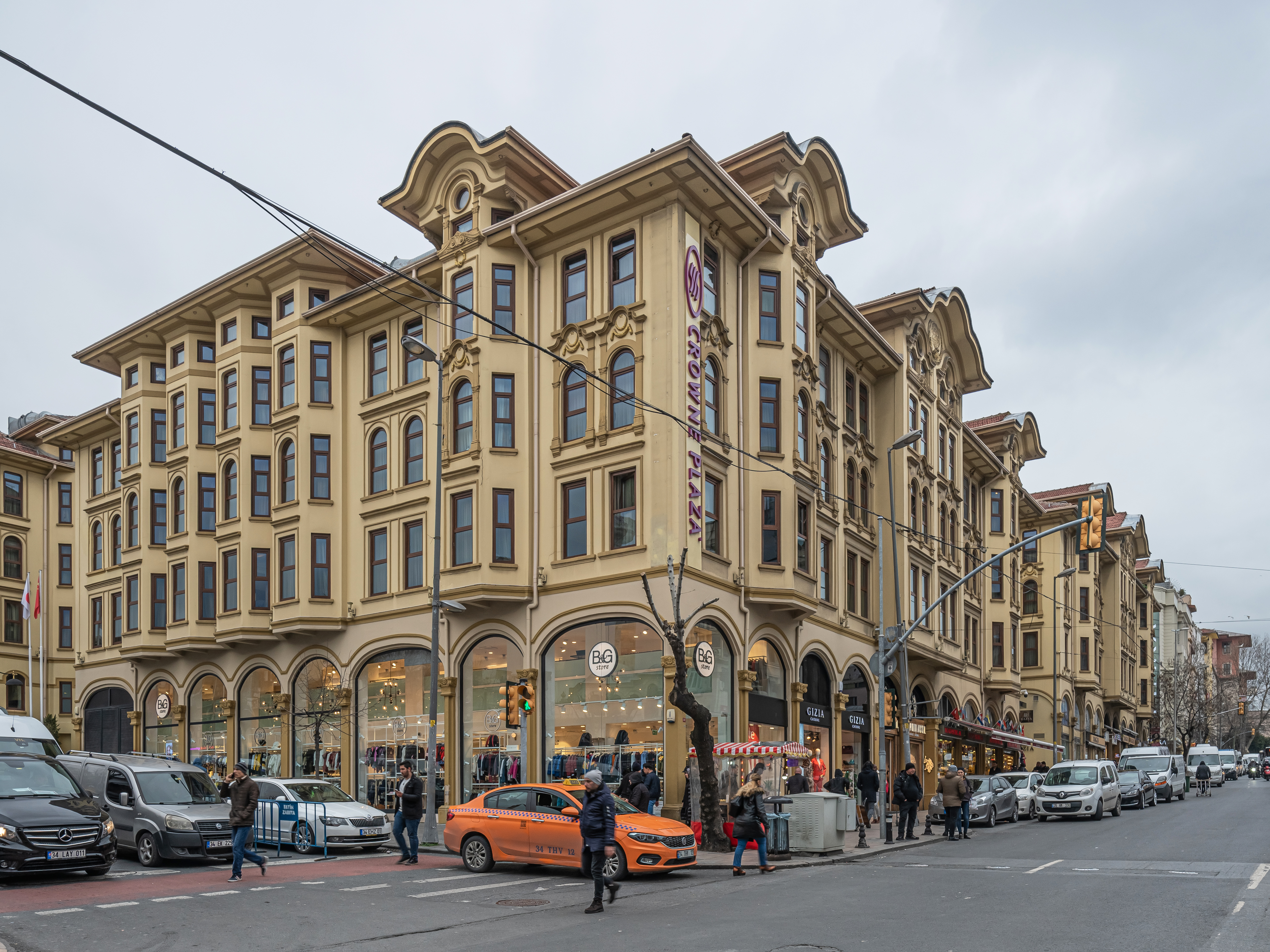
Tayyare Apartments in Istanbul, an example of the first national architectural movement

The architecture of Turkey includes heritage from the ancient era of Anatolia to the present day. Significant remains from the Greco-Roman period are located throughout the country. The Byzantine period produced, among other monuments, the celebrated Hagia Sophia in Constantinople (present-day Istanbul). Following the arrival of the Seljuk Turks in the 11th century, Seljuk architecture mixed Islamic architecture with other styles of local architecture in Anatolia. The Ottoman Empire ushered in a centuries-long tradition of Ottoman architecture up until the early 20th century.

In the first years of the Turkish republic (after 1923), Turkish architecture was influenced by earlier Seljuk and Ottoman architecture, in particular during the First National Architectural Movement (also called the Turkish Neoclassical architecture movement). However, starting from the 1930s, architectural styles began to differ from traditional architecture, also as a result of an increasing number of foreign architects being invited to work in the country, mostly from Germany and Austria. The Second World War was a period of isolation, during which the Second National Architectural Movement emerged. Similar to Fascist architecture, the movement aimed to create a modern but nationalistic architecture.

From the 1950s the nation became more internationally connected, which enabled Turkish architects to experiment with new styles and become increasingly inspired by their counterparts in the rest of the world. However, they were largely constrained by the lack of technological infrastructure or insufficient financial resources until the 1980s. Thereafter, the liberalization of the economy and the shift towards export-led growth paved the way for the private sector to become the leading influence on architecture in Turkey.

== Pre-modern era ==
=== Greco-Roman era ===
The ancient Greeks founded many city-states along the Aegean shores in western Anatolia and beyond. During the Hellenistic period, the Kingdom of Pergamon was one of the most powerful and the site of the city of Pergamon is one of Turkey's UNESCO World Heritage Sites today. Anatolia continued to prosper in the Roman era and cities such as Ephesus and Sardis, in addition to Pergamon, grew considerably during this time. Many of the Greco-Roman sites in the Aegean and Mediterranean regions of present-day Turkey thus preserve substantially, if not primarily, Roman constructions.

=== Byzantine era ===
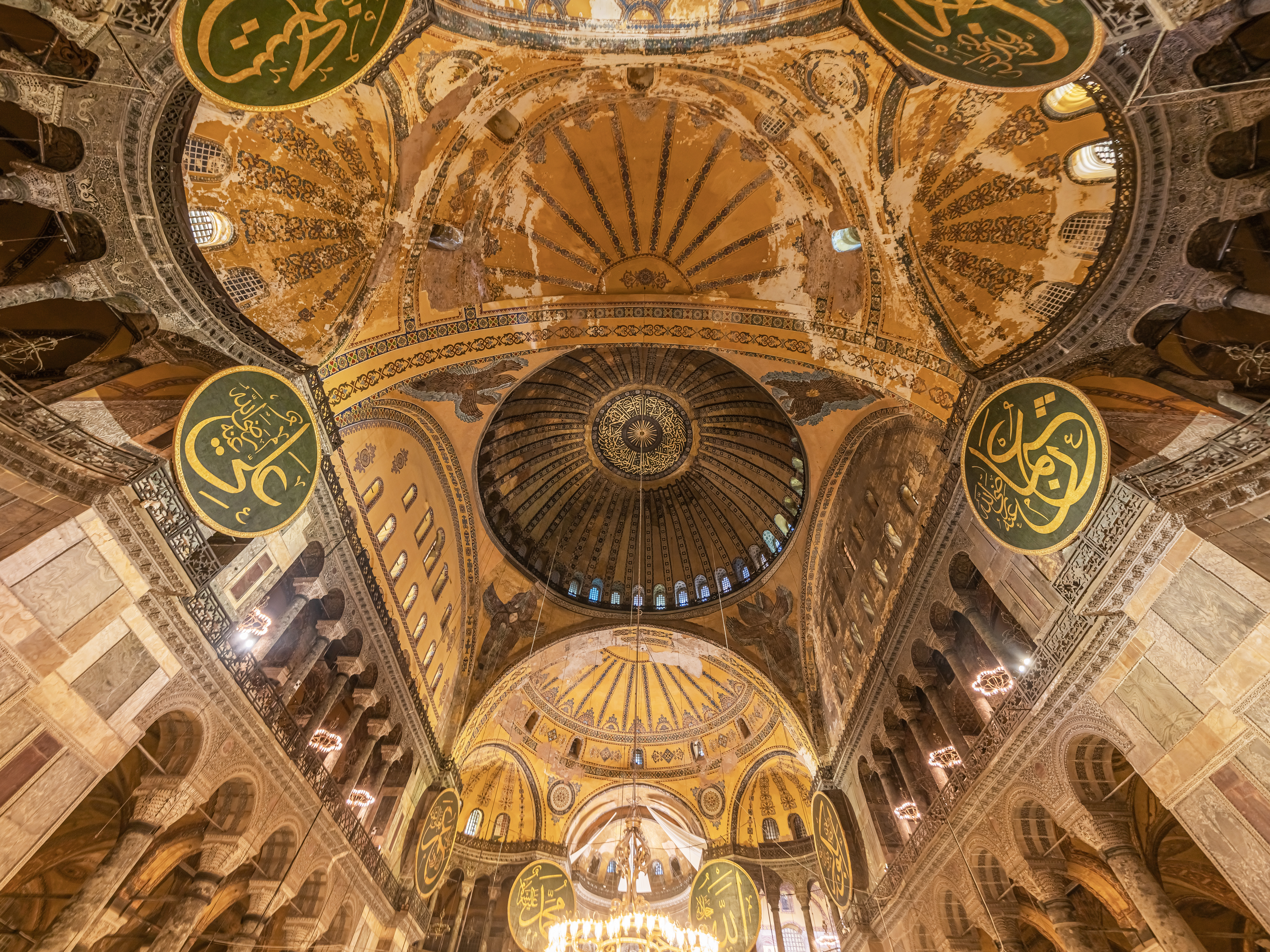
Interior of the Hagia Sophia, dominated by the central dome and flanking semi-domes. (Elements of Islamic decoration were added after the building's conversion to a mosque in 1453.)

The Byzantine era followed the division of the old Roman Empire into eastern and western halves in the late 4th century. The Eastern Roman Empire, also known as the Byzantine Empire, had its capital at Constantinople, present-day Istanbul. Byzantine architecture started as a continuation of late Roman architecture but it further developed over the following millennium. The Hagia Sophia, a massive domed church completed in 537 under Justinian I, is the greatest achievement of Byzantine architecture. It exercised significant influence on subsequent Byzantine church architecture and eventually on Ottoman architecture. The Byzantine style is also known for its sophisticated mosaic art. A major example of this art in the late Byzantine period is the 14th-century Chora Church (present-day Kariye Mosque) in Istanbul.

=== Seljuk and Beyliks era ===
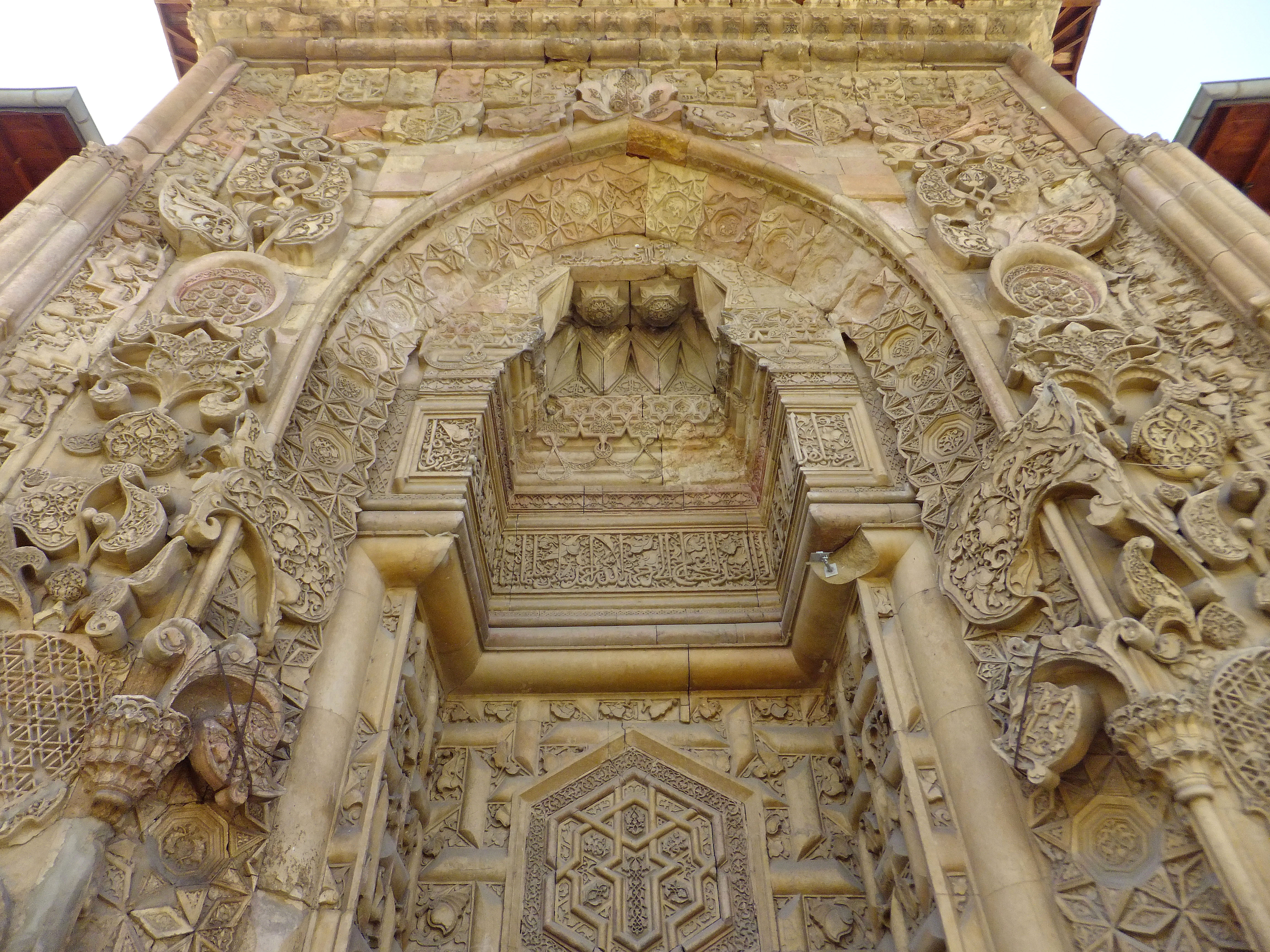
Portal of the Great Mosque of Divriği (1228–1229) in central Anatolia

Architecture under the Anatolian Seljuks incorporated an eclectic mix of influences, adopting local Byzantine, Armenian, and Georgian elements and combining them with designs from Islamic Syria, Iran, Iraq, and Central Asia. Their monuments were largely built in dressed stone, with brick used for minarets. Decoration was concentrated around certain elements like entrance portals and took the form of elaborate stone carving (e.g. the Ince Minareli Medrese and the Divriği complex), occasional ablaq stonework (e.g. Alâeddin Mosque in Konya), and large surfaces covered in tilework (e.g. Karatay Medrese).

As Anatolia fragmented into Beyliks during the later 13th and 14th centuries, architecture became even more diverse, particularly in western Anatolia, where proximity to the Byzantine and Mediterranean worlds encouraged further experimentation and syncretism.

== Ottoman era (14th to early 20th centuries) ==
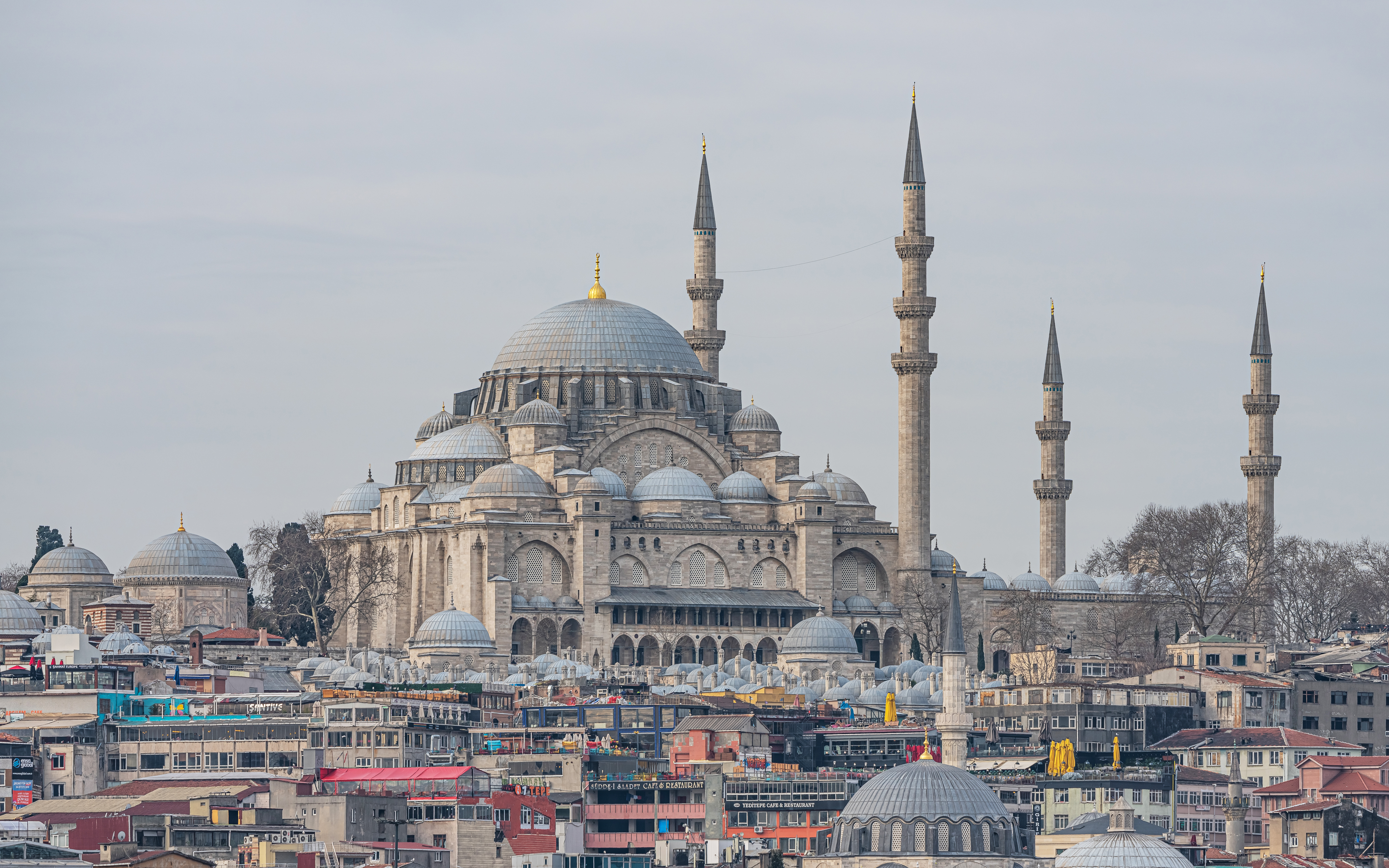
Süleymaniye Mosque (1550–1557) in Istanbul, designed by Mimar Sinan

The architecture of the early Ottomans experimented with different building types, including single-domed mosques, multi-domed buildings, and religious buildings with T-shaped floor plans. This eventually evolved into the Classical Ottoman style that was consolidated during the 16th and 17th centuries. This style, drawing strong influence from the Hagia Sophia, produced grand imperial mosques designed around a central dome and a varying number of semi-domes. This period is also associated with the most famous Ottoman architect, Mimar Sinan (d. 1588). Among his over 300 designs across the empire, his most important works include the Şehzade Mosque in Istanbul, the Süleymaniye Mosque in Istanbul, and the Selimiye Mosque in Edirne. In decorative arts, Iznik tiles reached their artistic peak and were used in many buildings.

After the 17th century, Ottoman architecture was increasingly open to outside influences. Shifts during the Tulip Period were followed by the appearance of the Ottoman Baroque style in the 1740s. In the 19th century, Western European influences increased and architects such as the Balyans produced eclectic works like the luxurious Dolmabaçe Palace. In the early 20th century, a kind of Ottoman revivalism known as the First National Architectural Movement was led by architects like Mimar Kemaleddin and Vedat Tek.

== 1920s to early 1930s: First national architectural movement ==
The First National Architecture Movement (Turkish: Birinci Ulusal Mimarlık Akımı) was an architectural movement led by Turkish architects Vedat Tek (1873–1942) and Mimar Kemaleddin Bey (1870–1927). Followers of the movement wanted to create a new and "national" architecture, which was based on motifs from Seljuk and Ottoman architecture. The movement was also labelled Turkish Neoclassical architecture, or the National Architectural Renaissance. Other prominent followers of this movement were Arif Hikmet Koyunoğlu (1888–1982) and Giulio Mongeri (1873–1953). Notable buildings from this era are the Istanbul Main Post Office (1905–1909), Tayyare Apartments (1919–1922), Istanbul 4th Vakıf Han (1911–1926), State Art and Sculpture Museum (1927–1930), Ethnography Museum of Ankara (1925–1928), Bebek Mosque, and Kamer Hatun Mosque.

Italian architect Raimondo D'Aronco served as the chief palace architect to the Ottoman Sultan Abdülhamid II in Istanbul for 16 years. D'Aronco designed and built a large number of buildings of various types in Istanbul. The stylistic features of his works can be classified in three groups: Revivalism, reinterpretation of the Ottoman forms, Art Nouveau and Vienna Secession. Art Nouveau was first introduced to Istanbul by D'Aronco, and his designs reveal that he drew freely on Byzantine and Ottoman decorations. D'Aronco also mixed Western and Oriental styles in his work, which was likewise a notable characteristic of the designs of Alexander Vallaury in the same period.

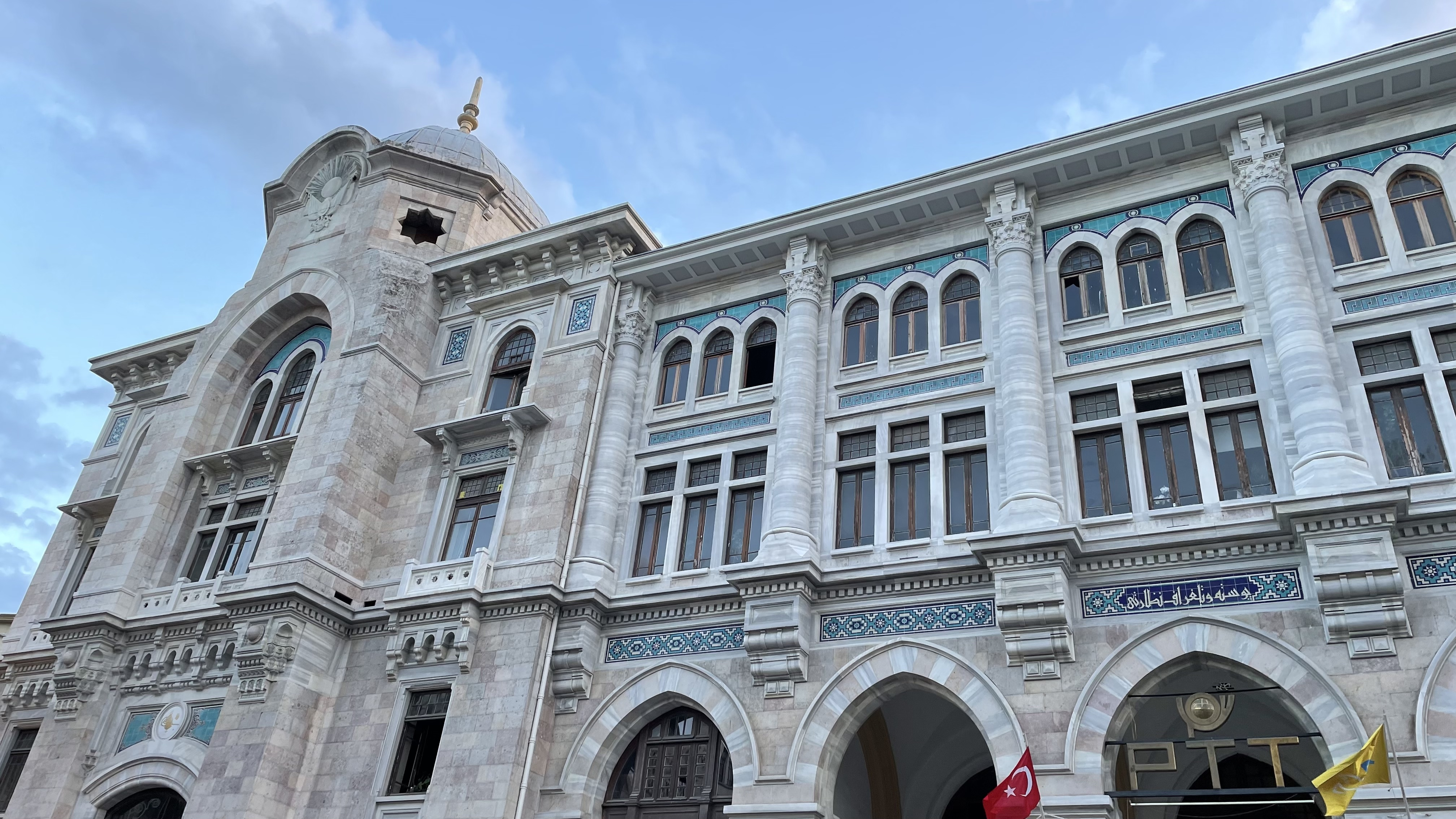
Istanbul Main Post Office in Sirkeci, designed by Vedat Tek (1905–1909).

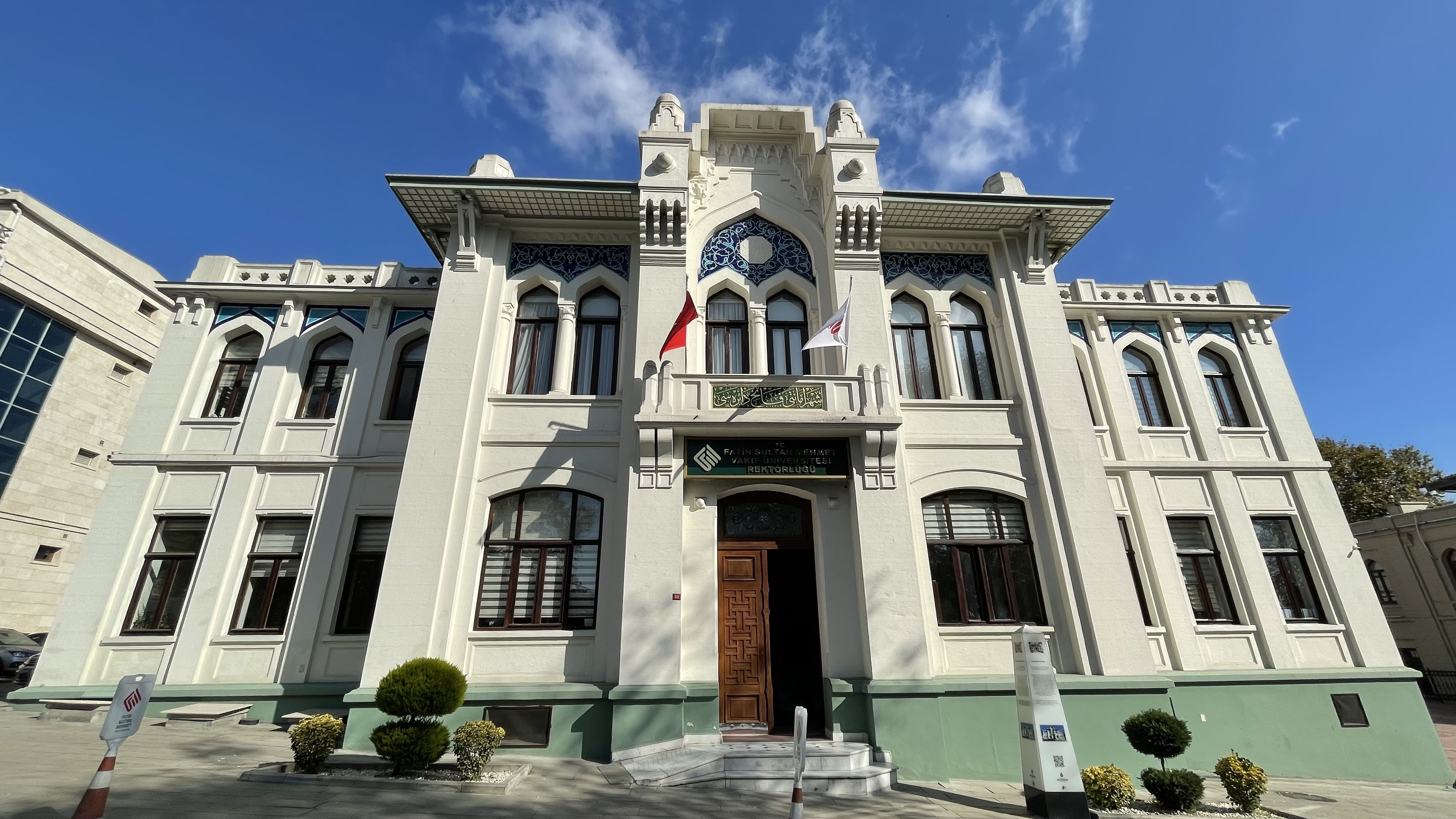
Old Fatih Municipality Building built by Yervant Terziyan

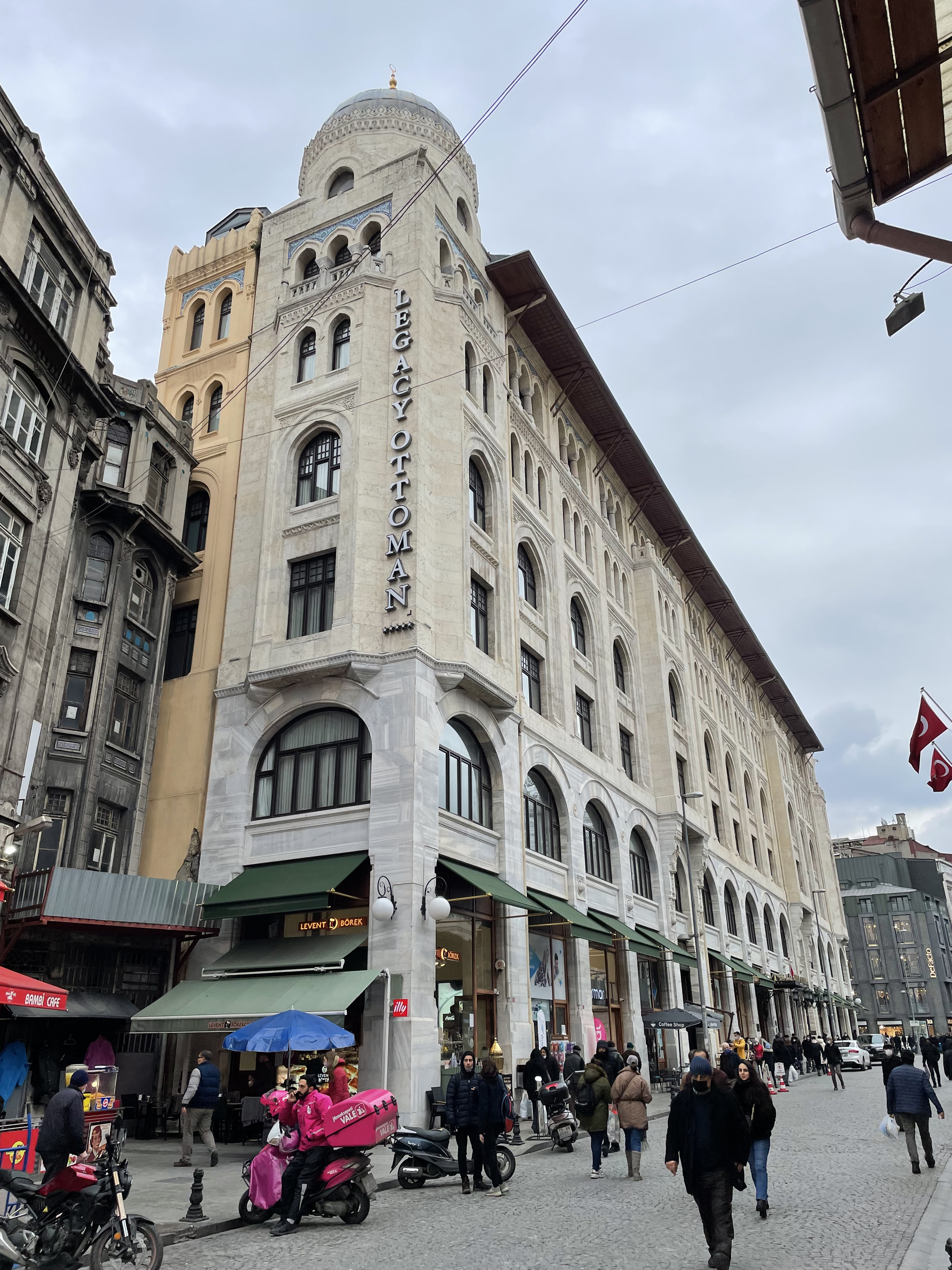
Istanbul 4th Vakıf Han in Eminönü, designed by Mimar Kemaleddin Bey (1911–1926).

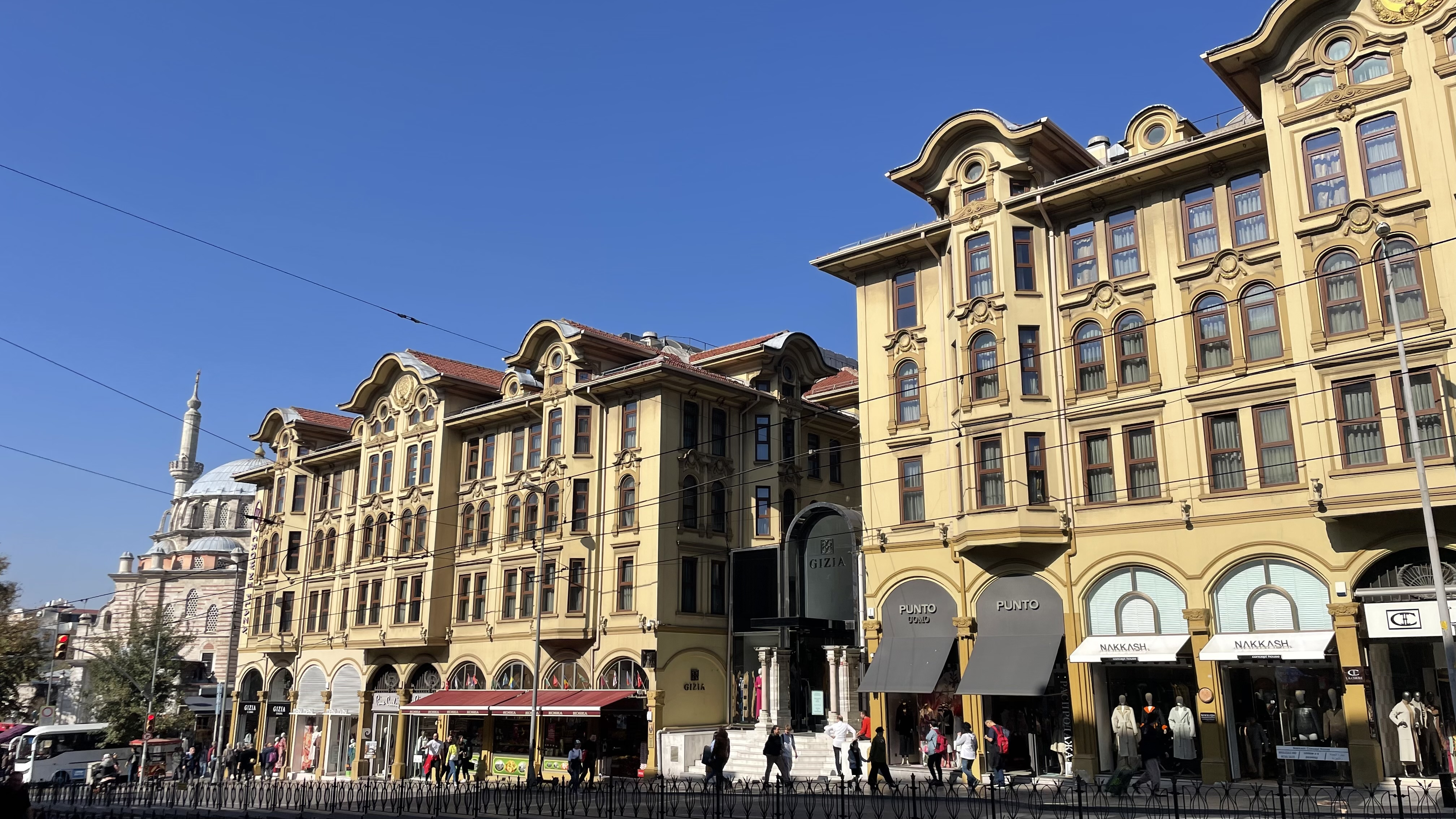
Tayyare Apartments in Laleli, Istanbul, designed by Mimar Kemaleddin Bey (1919–1922).

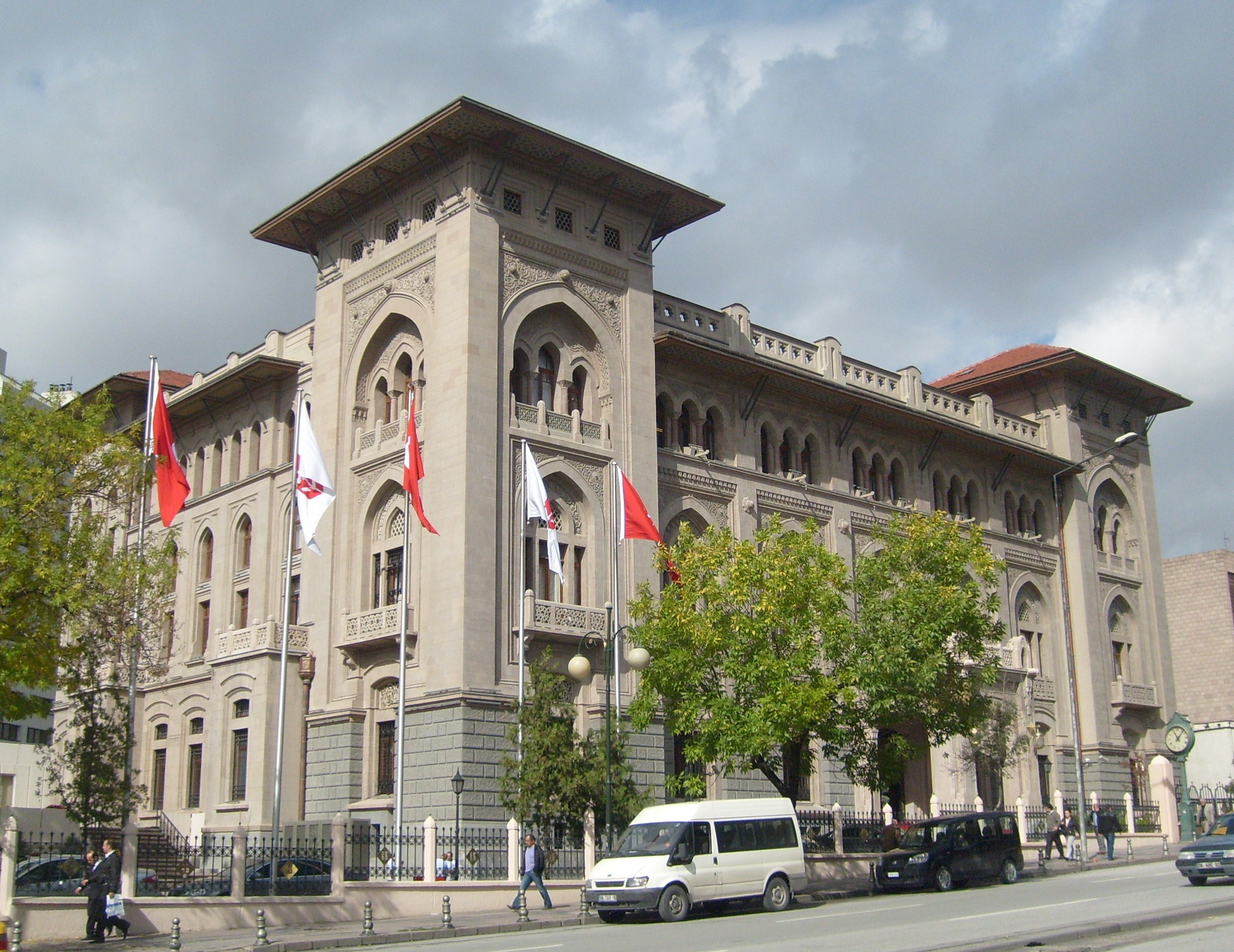
First Ziraat Bank Headquarters in Ankara, designed by Giulio Mongeri (1925–1929).

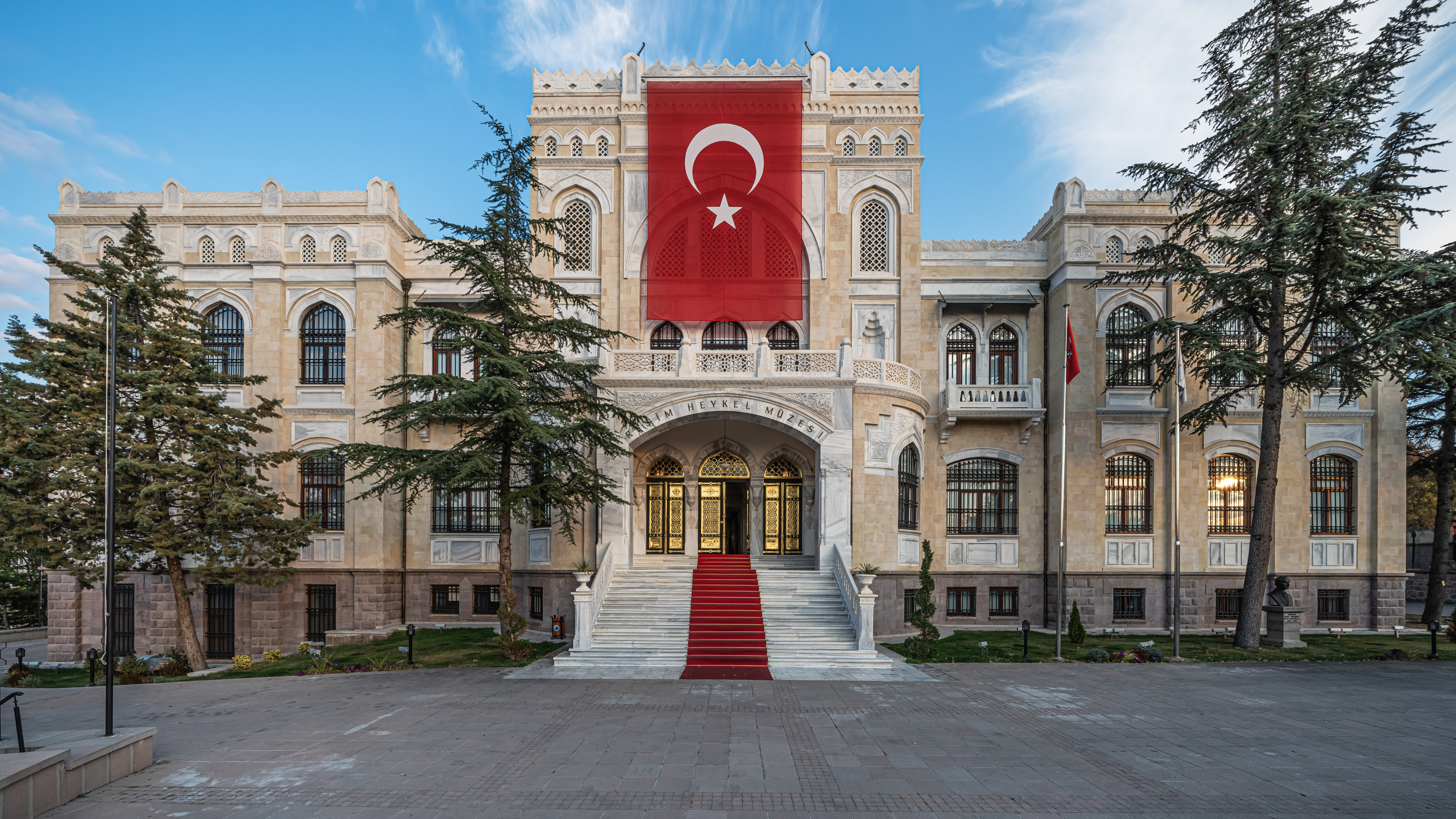
State Art and Sculpture Museum in Ankara, designed by Arif Hikmet Koyunoğlu (1927–1930).

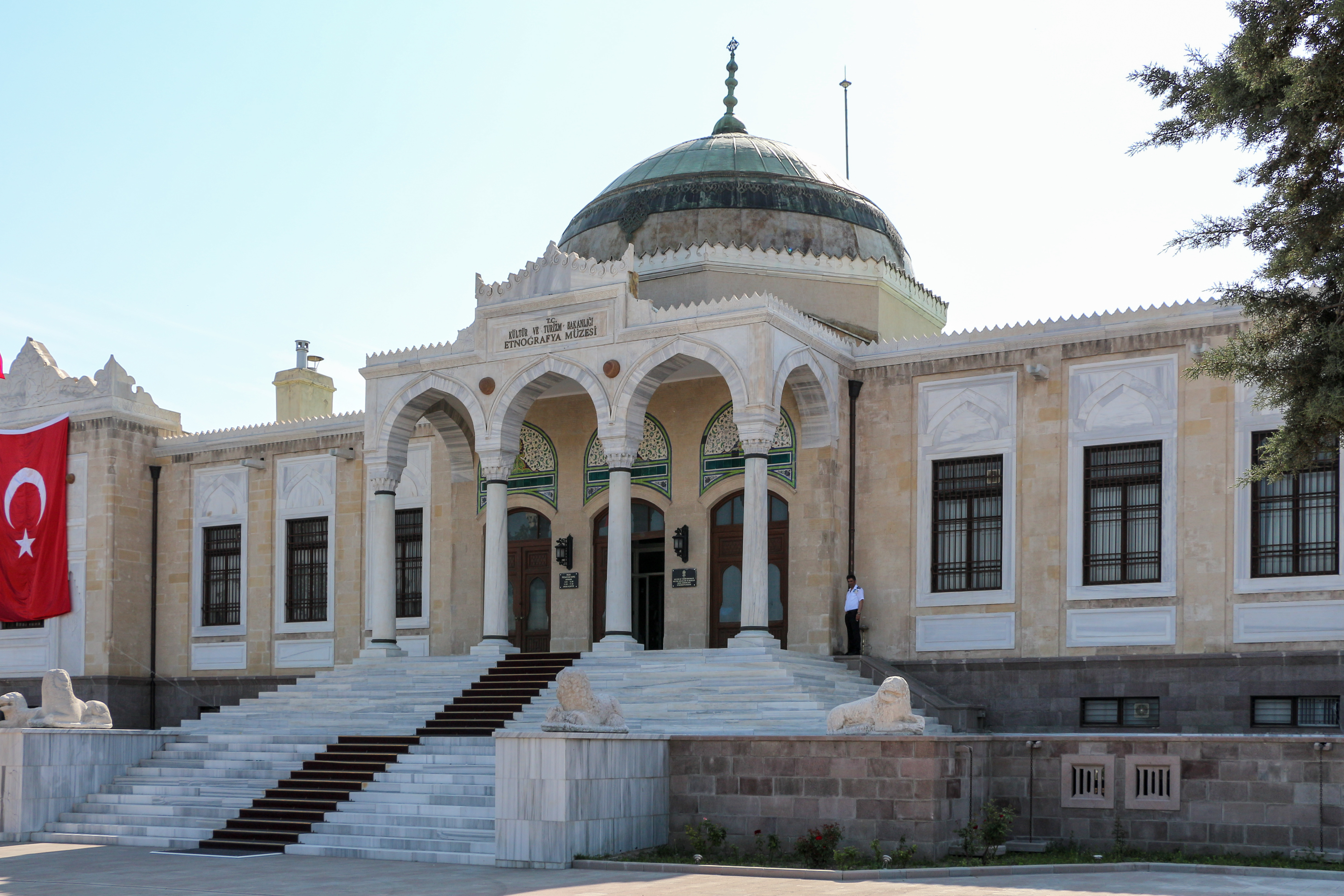
Ethnography Museum of Ankara was designed by architect Arif Hikmet Koyunoğlu (1925-1928).

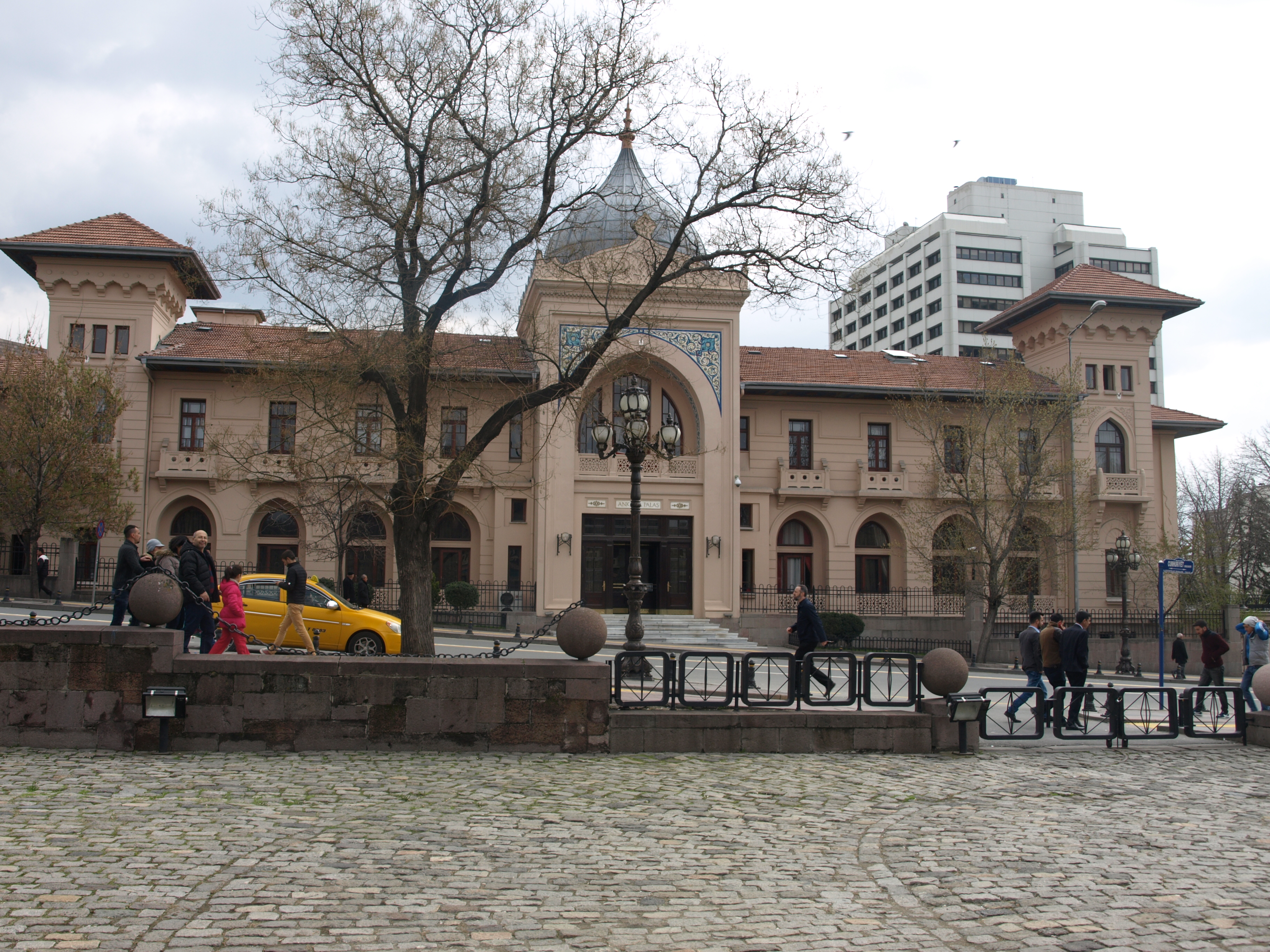
Ankara Palas Hotel

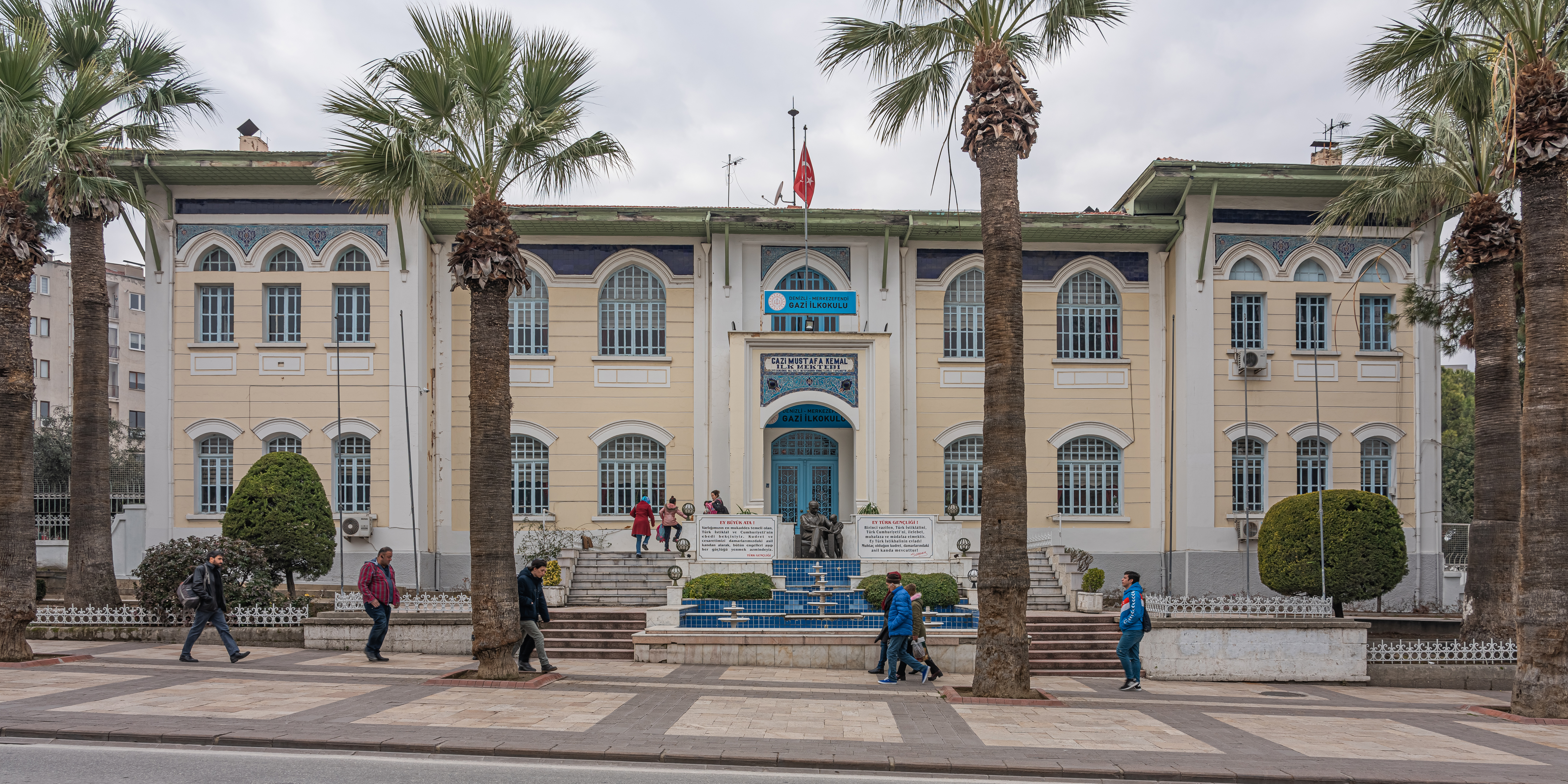
Denizli Gazi Mustafa Kemal Elementary School (1932)

== 1930s to 1950s: Modernism and foreign influence ==
The Bauhaus style Florya Atatürk Marine Mansion (1935) and the Art Deco style Ankara Central Station (1937) are among the notable examples of this era. As there were not enough architects in Turkey until the 1950s, various architects were invited by the government from Germany, Austria, Switzerland and France, in order to manage the rapid construction of the new capital Ankara. About 40 architects and urban planners designed and oversaw various projects (mostly in Ankara, and to a lesser extent in Istanbul and İzmir) between 1924 and 1942. Among them were Gudrun Baudisch, Rudolf Belling, Paul Bonatz, Ernst Arnold Egli, Martin Elsaesser, Anton Hanak, Franz Hillinger, Clemens Holzmeister, Henri Prost, Paolo Vietti-Violi, Werner Issel, Hermann Jansen, Theodor Jost, Heinrich Krippel, Carl Christoph Lörcher, Robert Oerley, Bernhard Pfau, Bruno Taut and Josef Thorak.

Selected examples of buildings from this era are the Bauhaus style Florya Atatürk Marine Mansion (1935) designed by Seyfi Arkan; the Art Deco style Ankara railway station (1937) designed by Şekip Akalın; the Court of Cassation building (1933–35) designed by Clemens Holzmeister; the Faculty of Languages, History and Geography building (1937) of Ankara University designed by Bruno Taut; and the Grand National Assembly of Turkey building (1938–63) designed by Clemens Holzmeister.

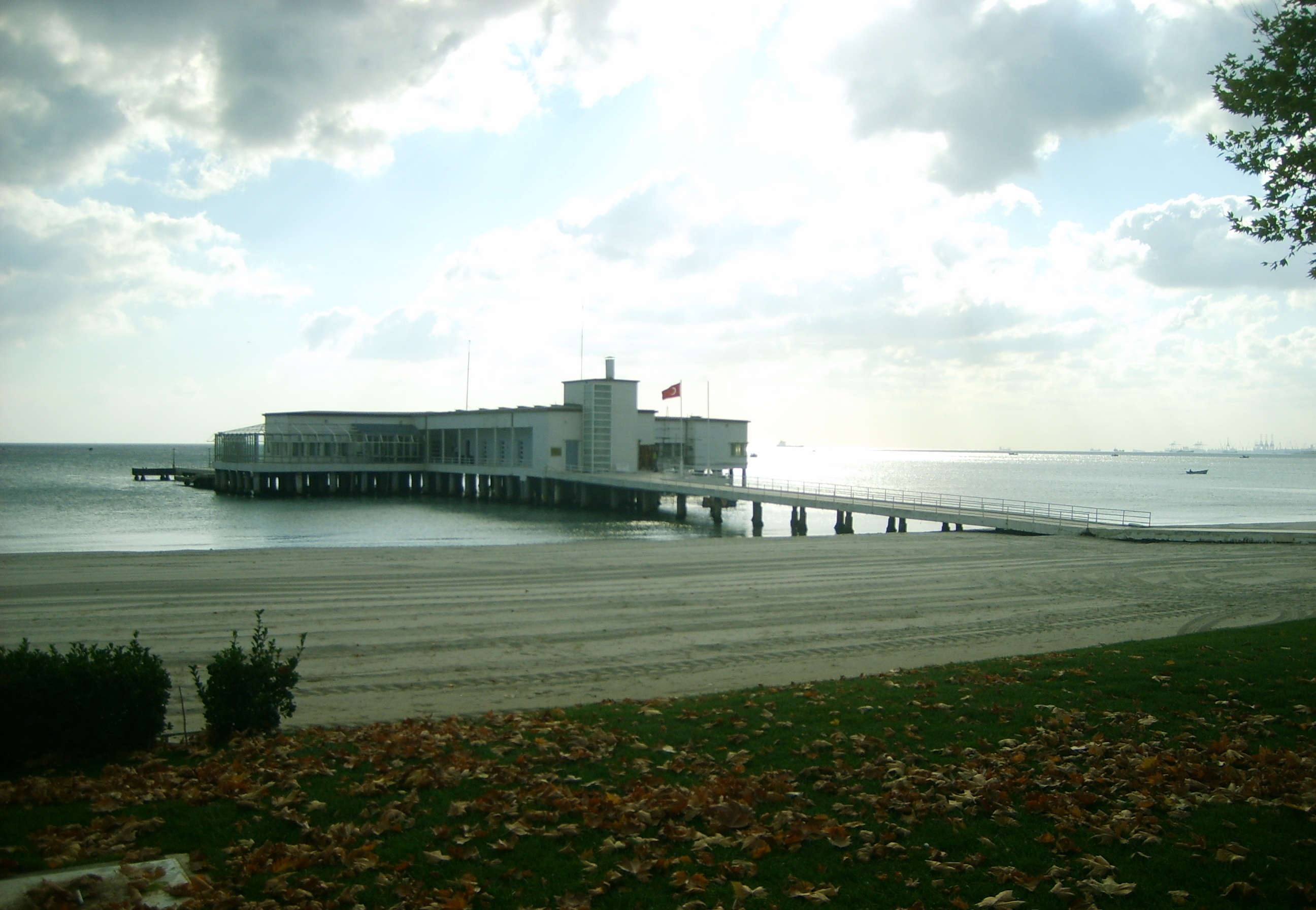
Designed by Seyfi Arkan, Florya Atatürk Marine Mansion (1935) is a notable Bauhaus style building in Istanbul.

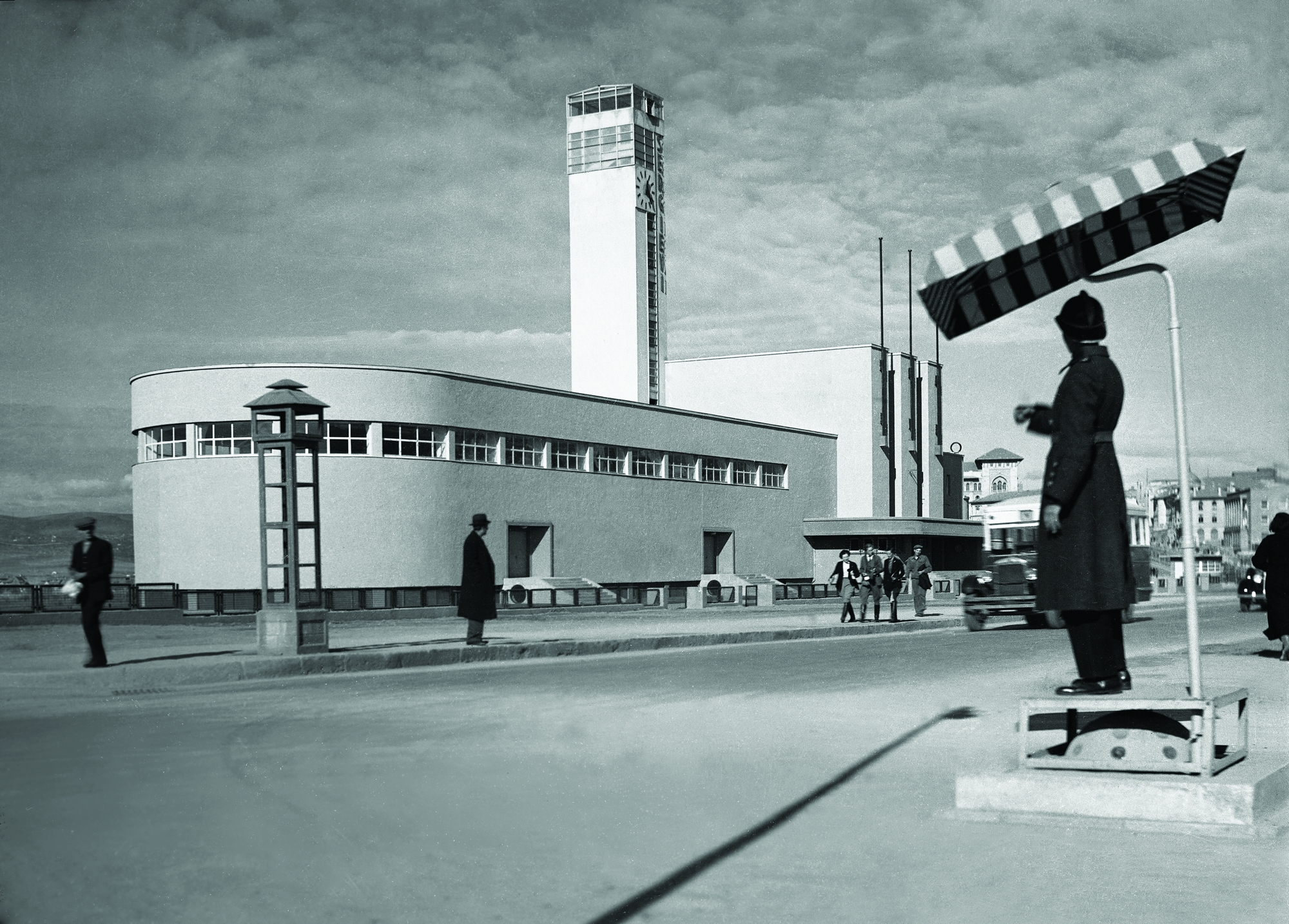
Ankara Opera House, designed by Şevki Balmumcu (1933–34) and renovated by Paul Bonatz (1946–47).

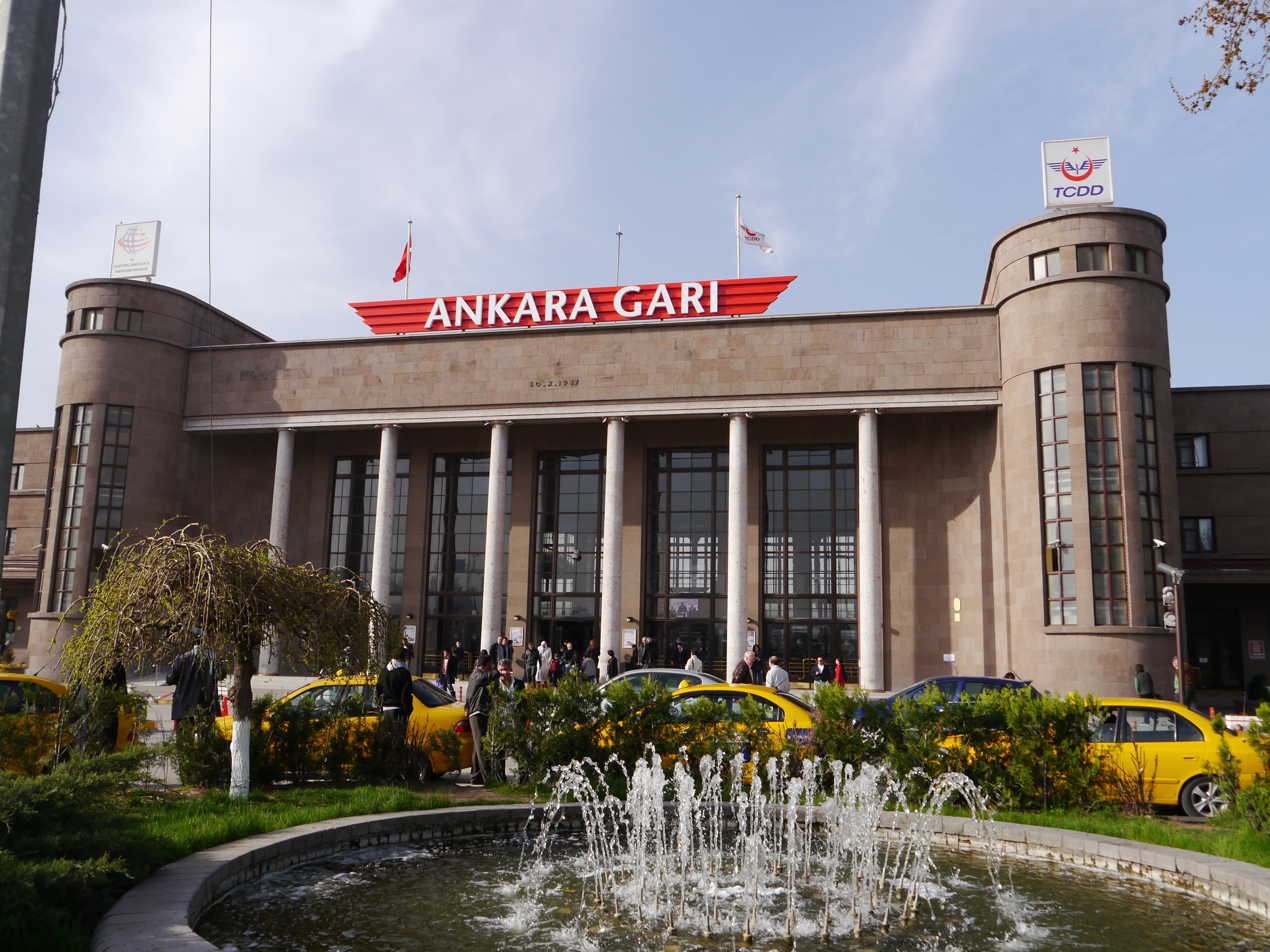
Designed by Şekip Akalın, Ankara Central Station (1937) is a notable Art Deco design of its era.

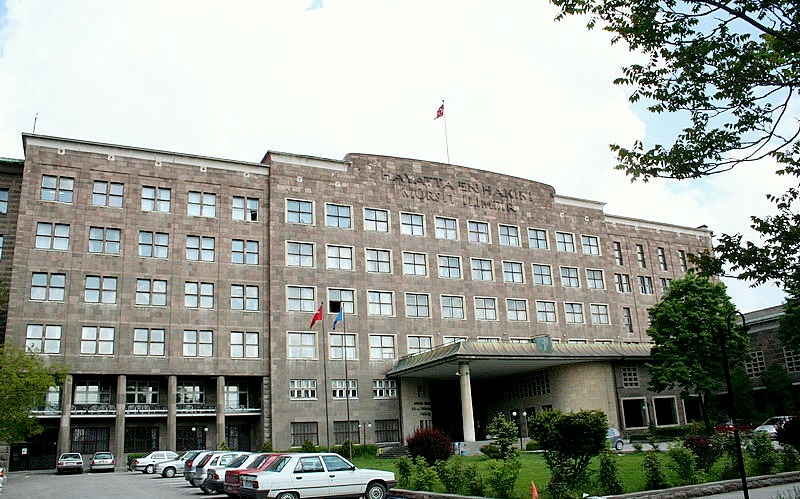
The Faculty of Languages, History and Geography building (1937) of Ankara University was designed by Bruno Taut.

=== Second national architectural movement ===
The Stripped Classicism movement of the late 1930s and early 1940s in Europe and North America sought a modern interpretation of Neoclassical architecture. The movement had a particularly notable impact on Fascist architecture in Italy and Nazi architecture in Germany, which aimed to develop the modern versions of the architecture of the Roman (Italy) and Holy Roman (Germany) empires, according to their ideologies. In the same period, there was a trend towards creating a new national architecture in Turkey, which was called the Second National Architectural Movement (Turkish: İkinci Ulusal Mimarlık Akımı). The foreign architects employed in Turkey in this period (especially from Germany and Austria) played an important role in the introduction of this architectural movement and its style. The pioneers of the movement in Turkey were Sedad Hakkı Eldem, Ekrem Hakkı Ayverdi and Emin Halid Onat. To lead this movement, Professor Sedad Hakkı Eldem held National Architecture seminars at Mimar Sinan Fine Arts University, focusing on traditional Turkish house styles.

Like their contemporary equivalents in Europe and North America, the government buildings of this style in Ankara and Istanbul typically had large proportions (high ceilings, high windows, etc.) to give the impression of a strong state authority. Some of them also had monumental facade designs reminiscent of Neoclassical architecture; but with more modern and plain rectangular shapes, symmetry, simplicity, and a general lack of ornateness.

Some of the buildings in this style are the Ankara Opera House, designed by Şevki Balmumcu (1933–34) and renovated by Paul Bonatz (1946–47); the TCDD General Headquarters Building designed by Bedri Uçar in 1938; Istanbul University Faculty of Science and Faculty of Literature buildings (1944–52); Anıtkabir (1944–53); Istanbul Radio Headquarters (1945–49); Şişli Mosque (1945–49); and the Çanakkale Martyrs' Memorial (1954–60). The movement was particularly influential between 1935 and 1950. From the 1950s, the influence of this style diminished due to the next wave, especially International Style and Rationalism.

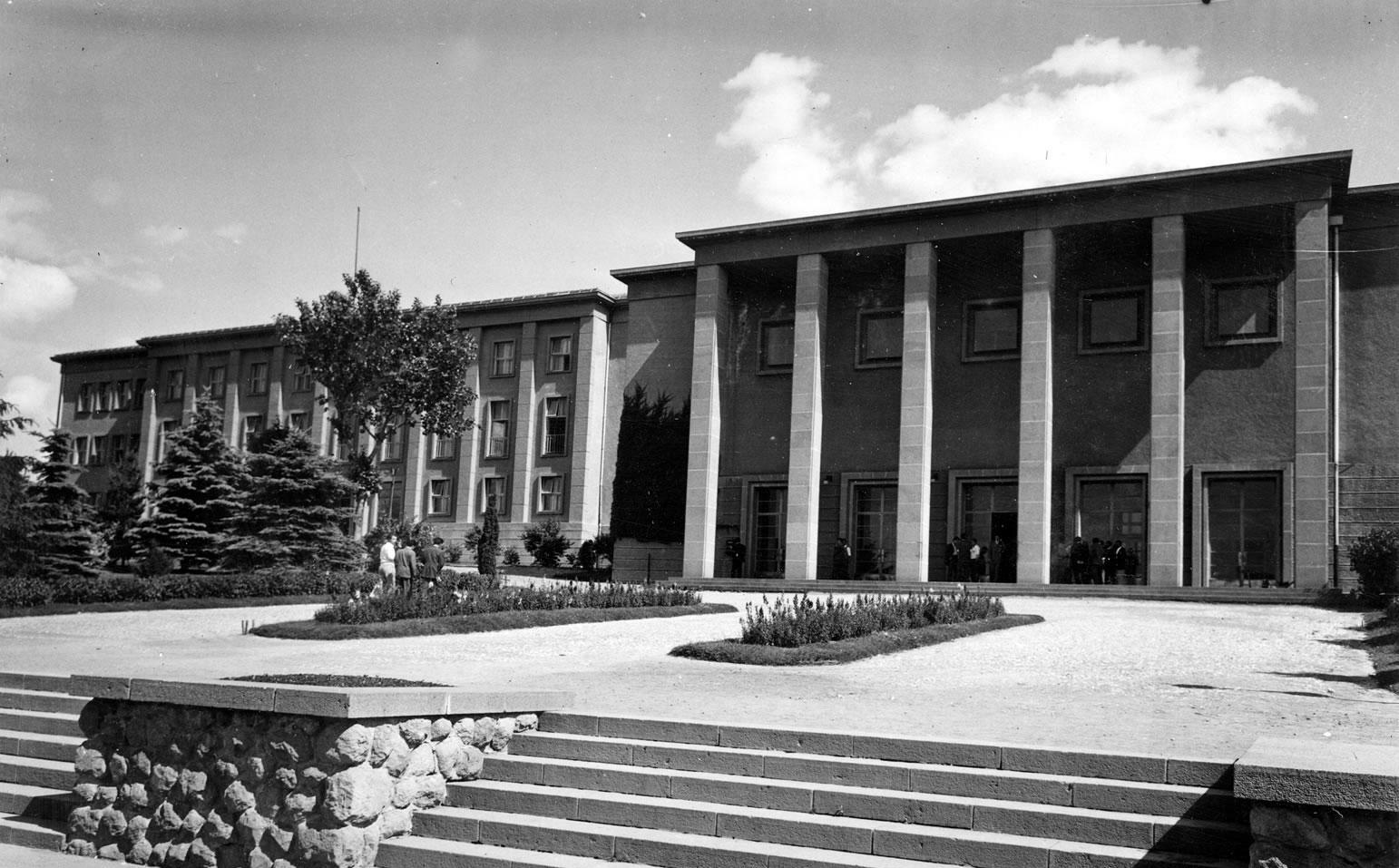
The Faculty of Law building (1937) of Ankara University.

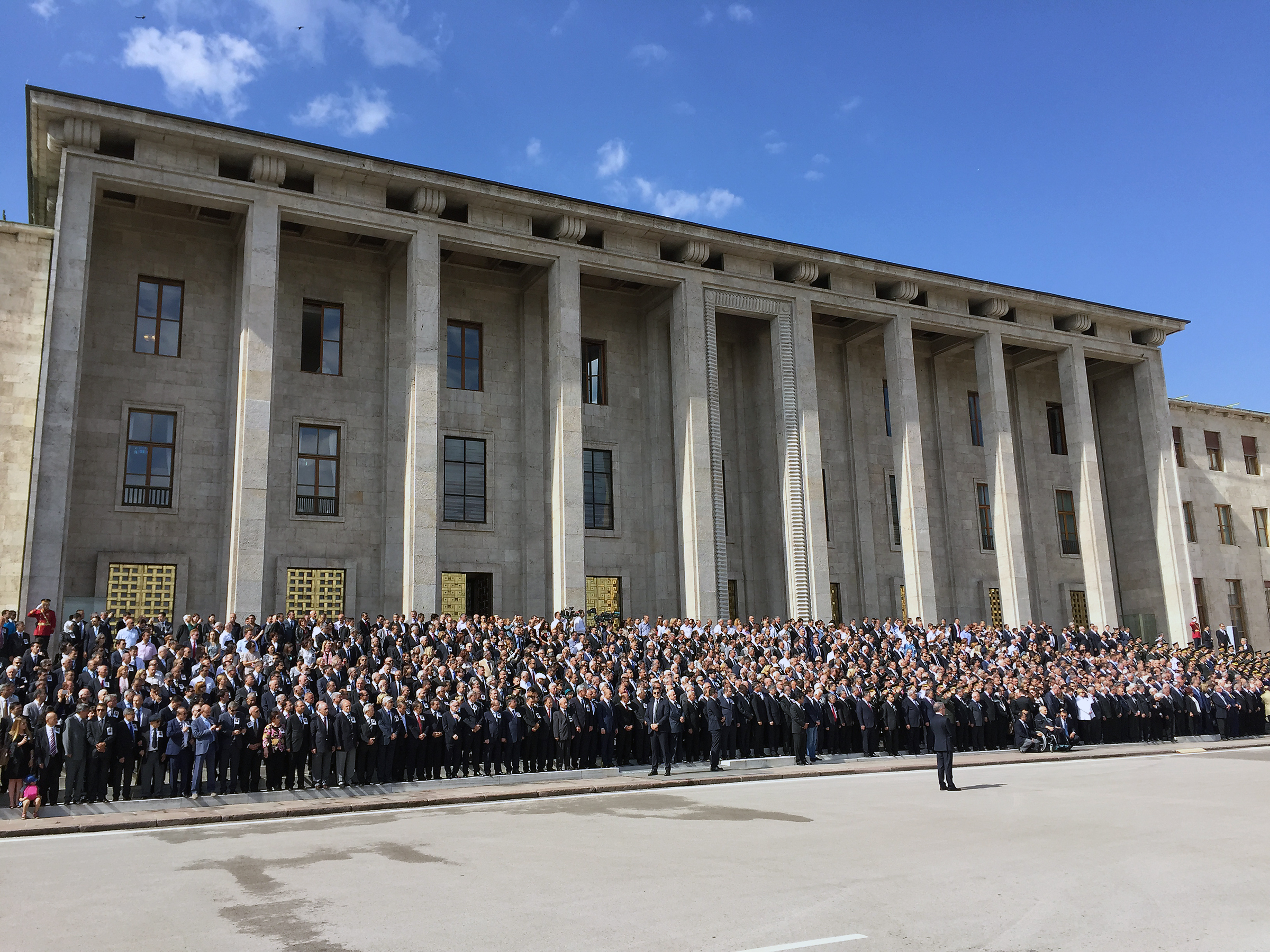
The Grand National Assembly of Turkey building (1938–63) in Ankara was designed by Clemens Holzmeister.

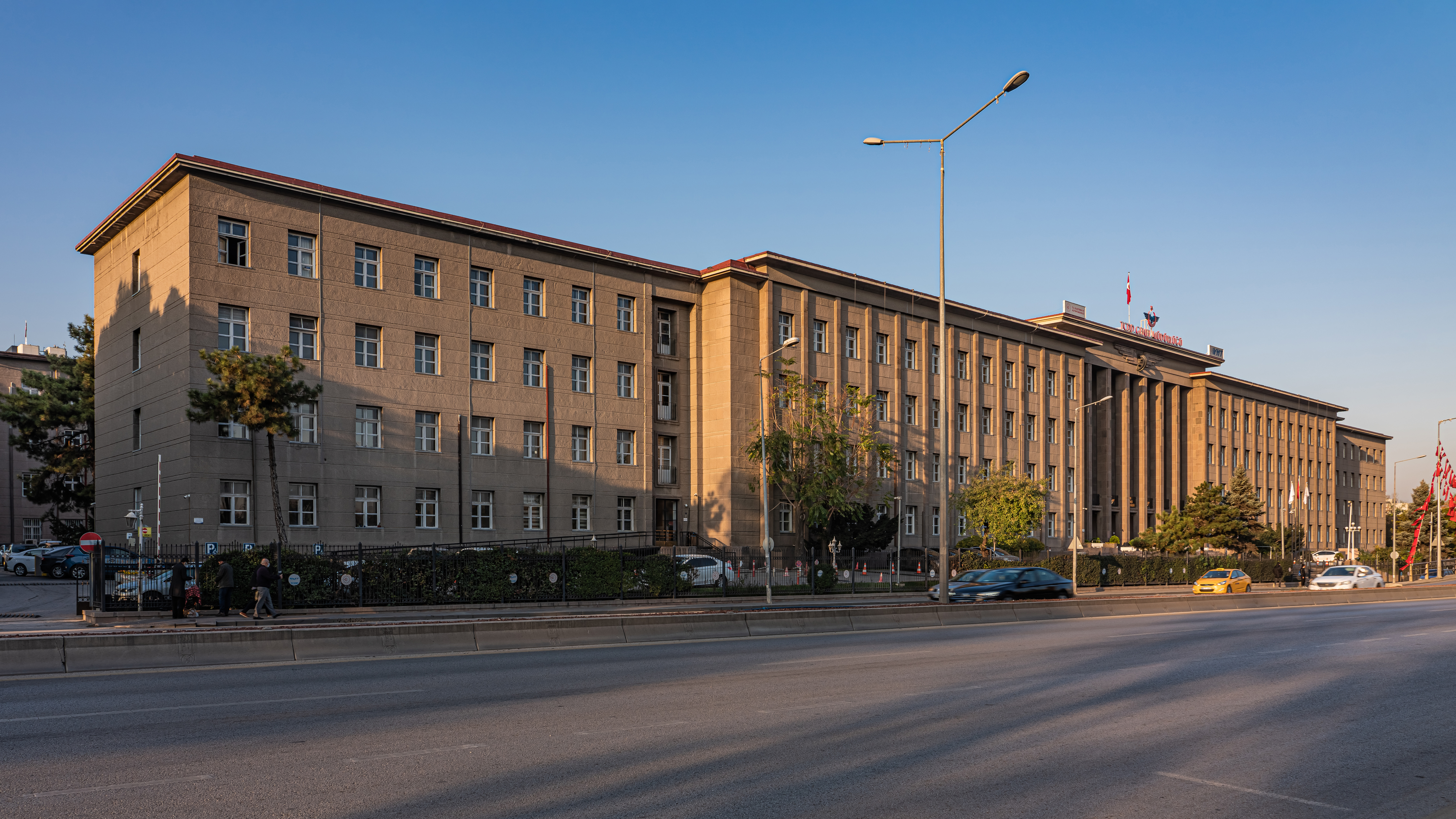
TCDD General Headquarters Building, designed by Bedri Uçar (1939–41).

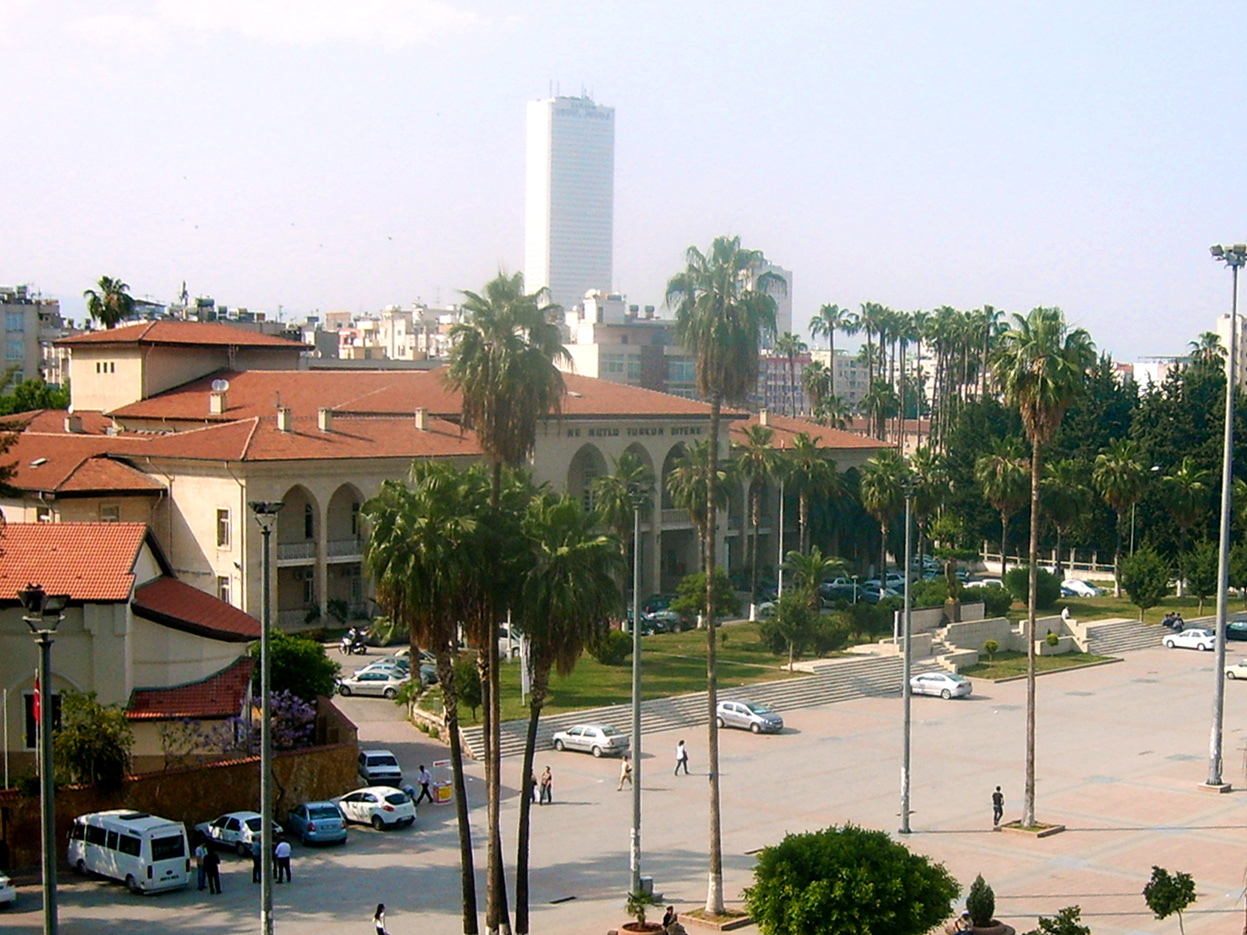
The Halkevi in Mersin, designed by Ertuğrul Menteşe (1944–46).

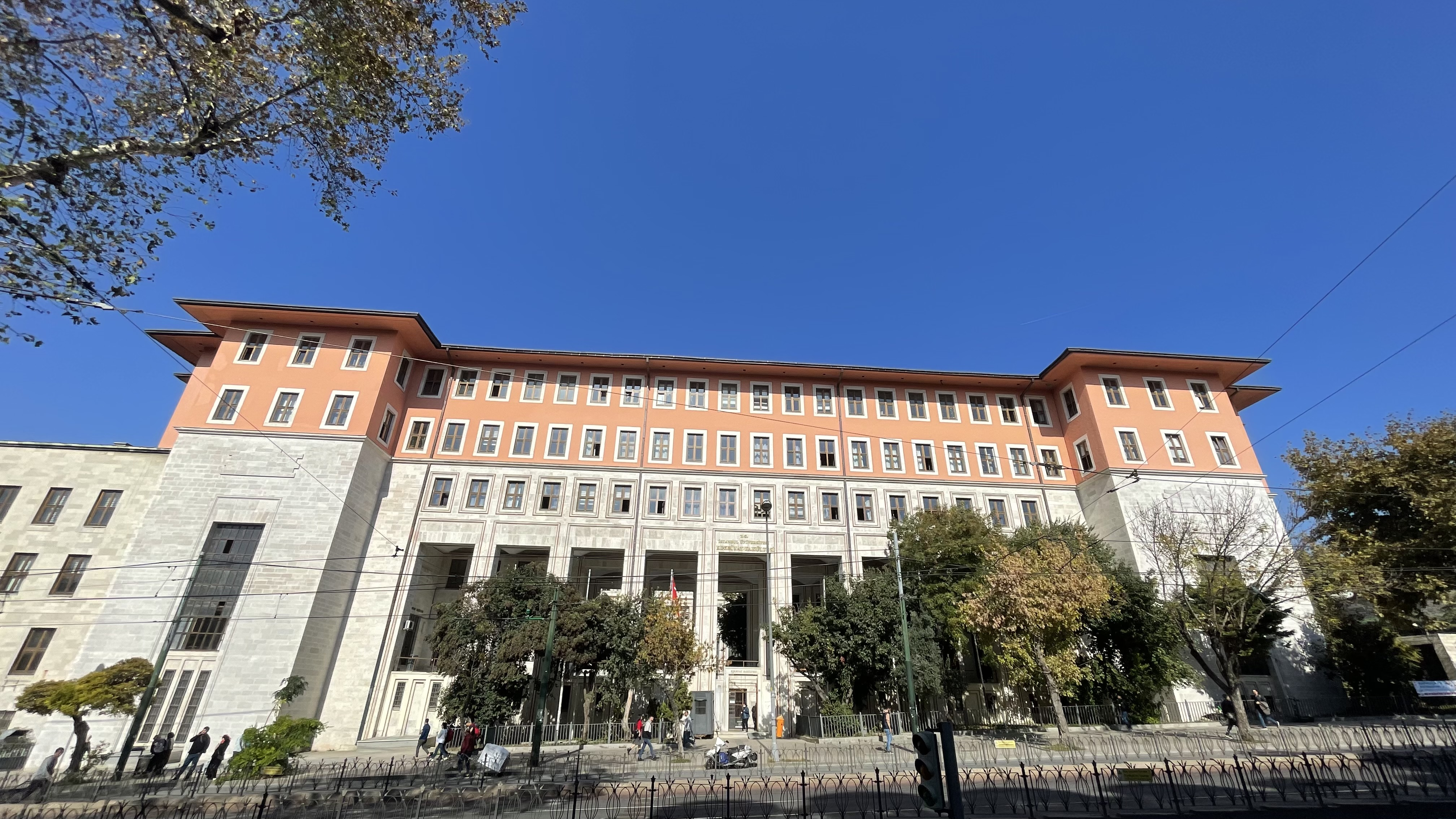
Istanbul University Faculty of Science and Faculty of Literature Buildings, designed by Sedad Hakkı Eldem and Emin Halid Onat (1944–52).

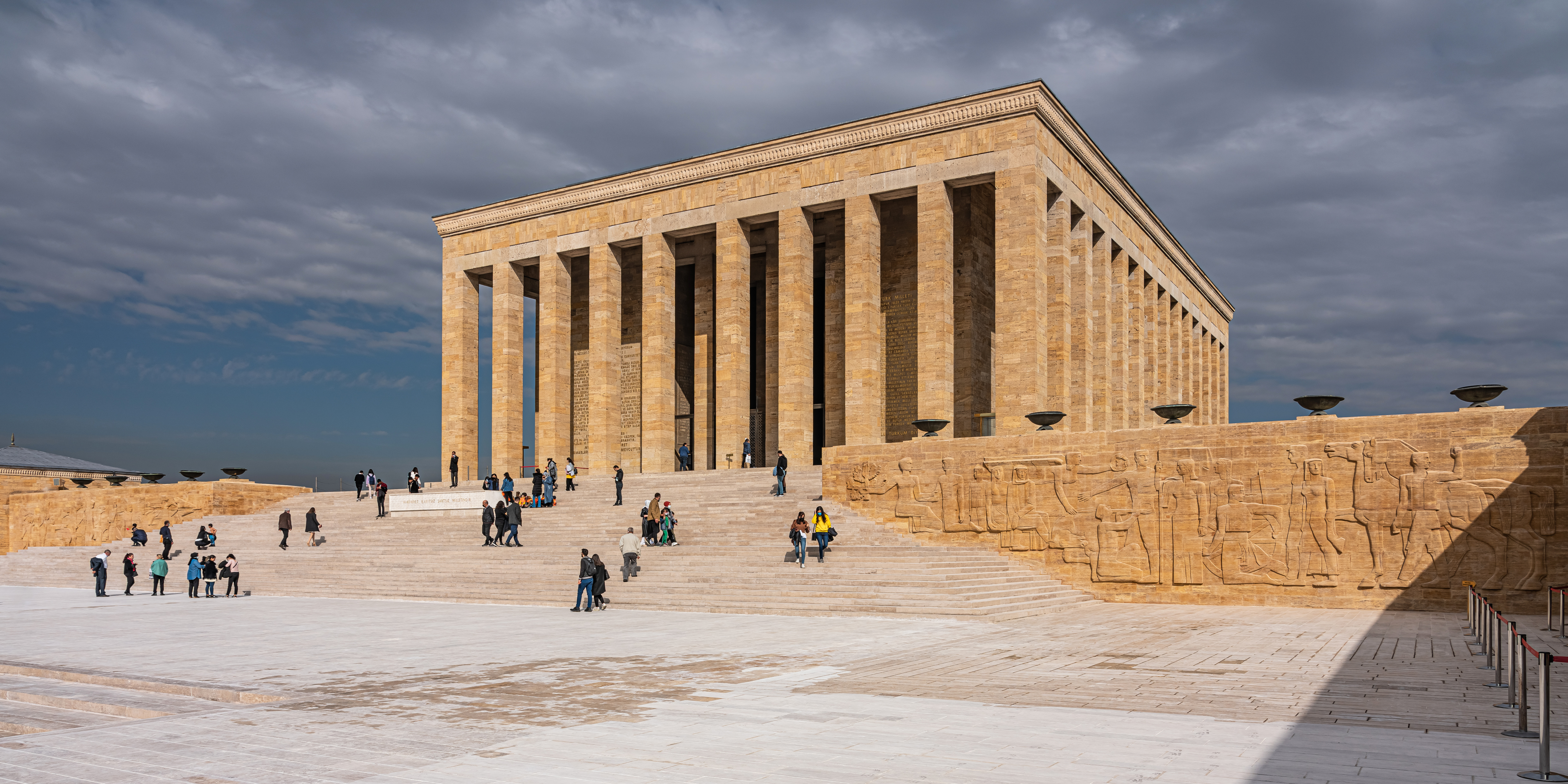
Anıtkabir in Ankara, designed by Emin Halid Onat and Ahmet Orhan Arda (1944–53).

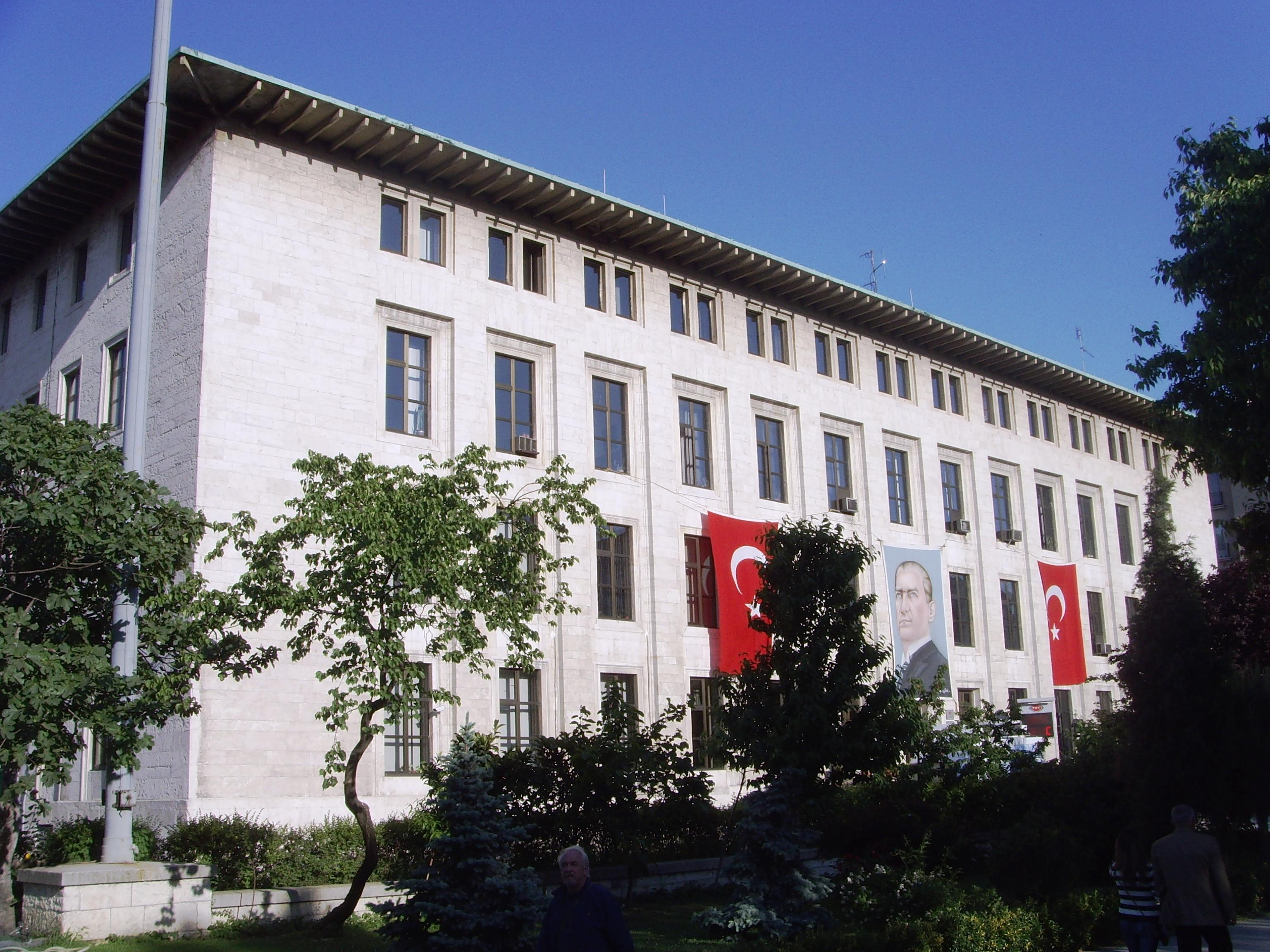
Istanbul Radio Hall, designed by Doğan Erginbaş, Ömer Güney and İsmail Utkular (1945).

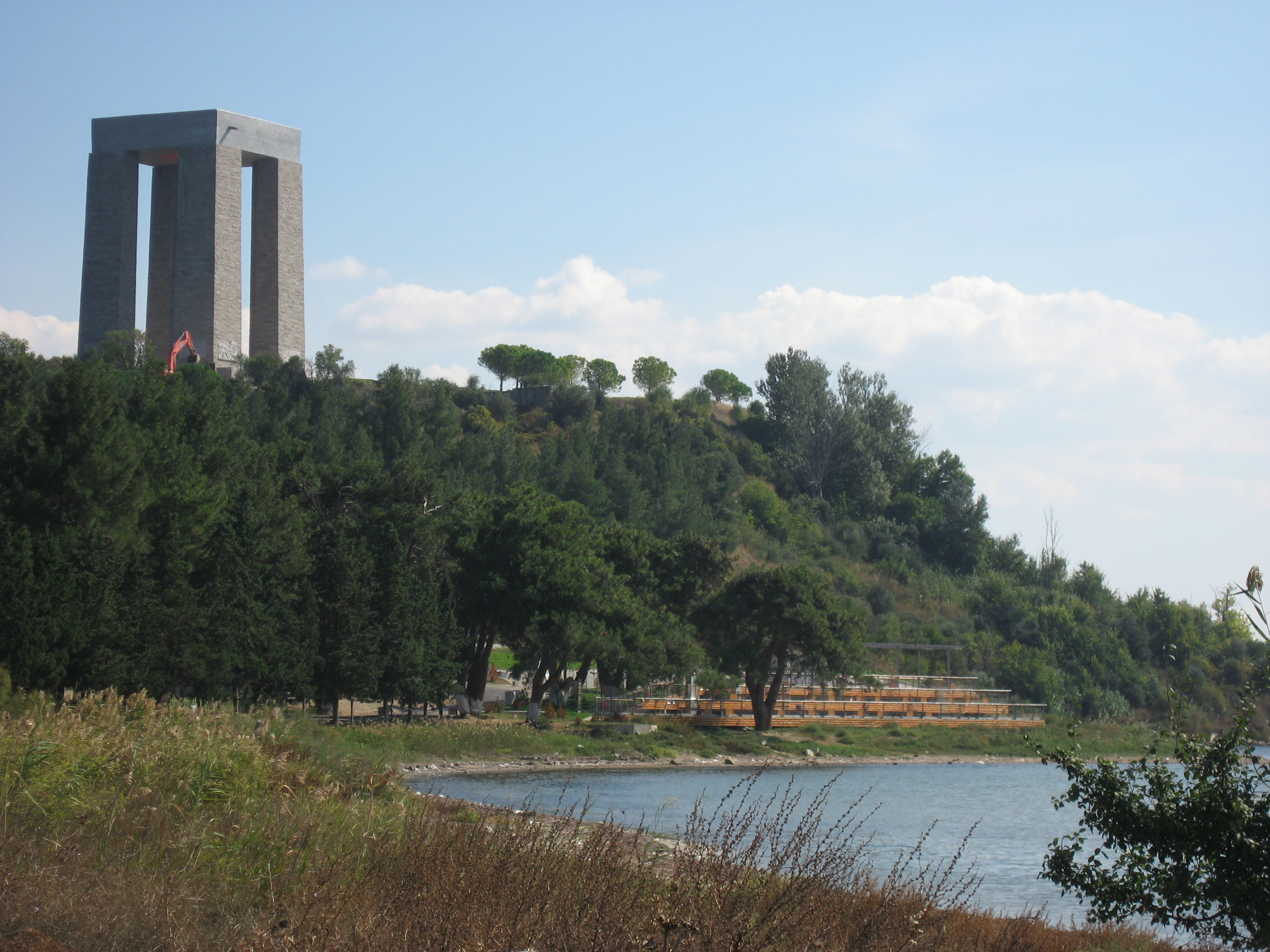
Çanakkale Martyrs' Memorial, designed by Feridun Kip, Doğan Erginbaş and İsmail Utkular (1954–60).

== 1950s and more Western influence ==
At the beginning of the 1950s, a new generation of architects such as Nevzat Erol, Turgut Cansever, Abdurrahman Hancı, Cengiz Bektaş, Hayati Tabanlıoğlu, Enver Tokay, İlhan Tayman and Yılmaz Sanlı became more influential in the architectural arena. These were architects who either studied in Europe or had information of the modernist architecture of the time. Their quest for modernist architecture was in line with the International Style and Rationalism. However, the development of the Turkish economy was an important factor as well. Even though Turkish architects were able to follow up on the modern design of important architects of the time, they were constrained by the lack of technological infrastructure or insufficient financial resources.

Selected examples of buildings from this era are the Anadolu Club Hotel (1951–1957) in Büyükada designed by Turgut Cansever and Abdurrahman Hancı; Hilton Istanbul Bosphorus (1952–1955) designed by Skidmore, Owings & Merrill and Sedad Hakkı Eldem; Istanbul Municipality Headquarters (1953–1960) designed by Nevzat Erol; Emek Business Center (1959–1965) in Ankara designed by Enver Tokay and İlhan Tayman; and Tekel Headquarters (1958–1960) in Istanbul designed by Yılmaz Sanlı and İlhan Tayman.

One of the most important developments of this period was the establishment of the Chamber of Architects of Turkey in 1954. Various professional organizations for architects had existed beforehand, but there were no laws for the architectural profession until 1954. Brutalist architecture become popular during 1950s, the work of Behruz Çinici in Middle East Technical University is the best example of this era.

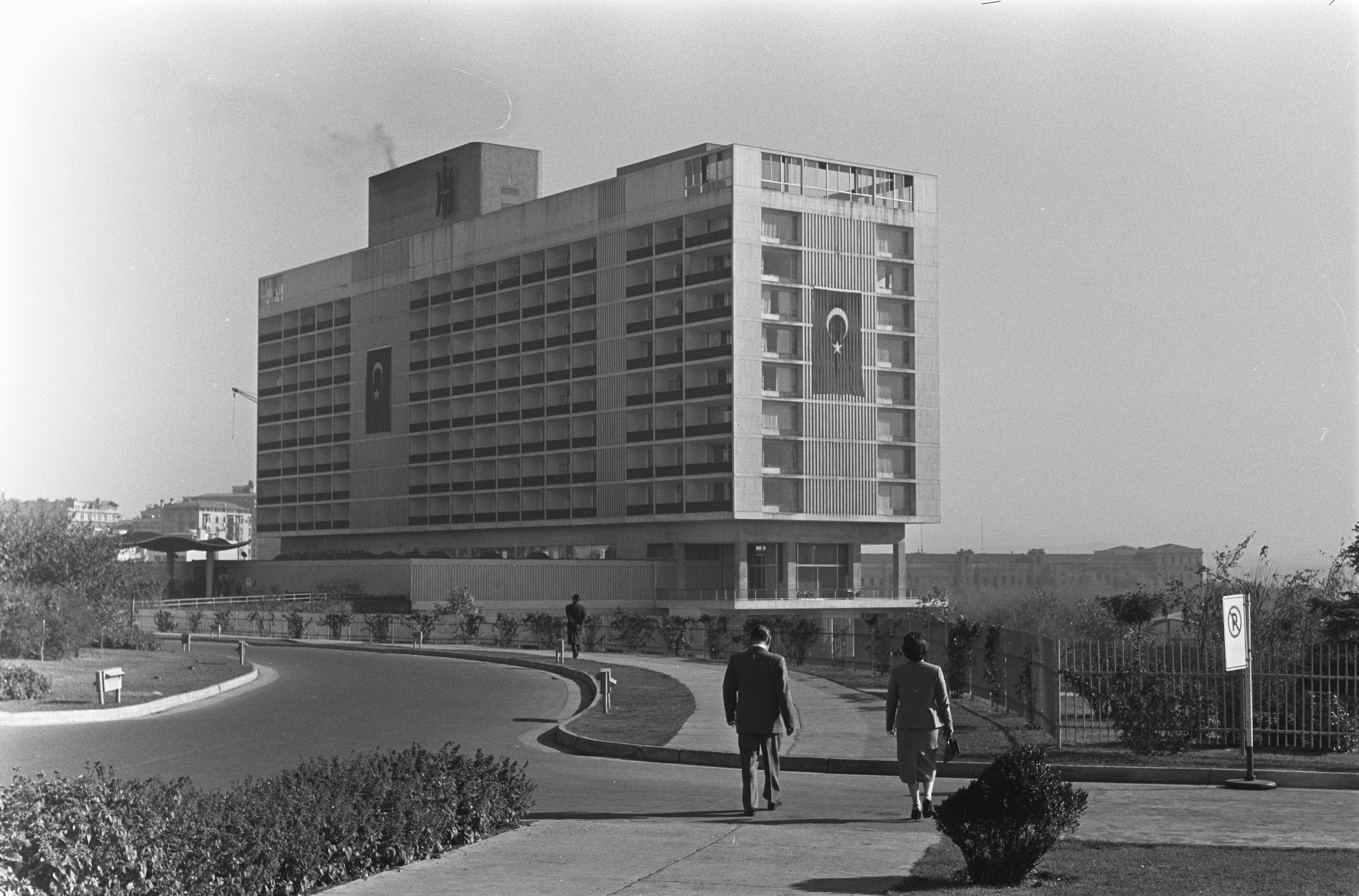
Hilton Istanbul Bosphorus was designed in 1952 by SOM and Sedad Hakkı Eldem.

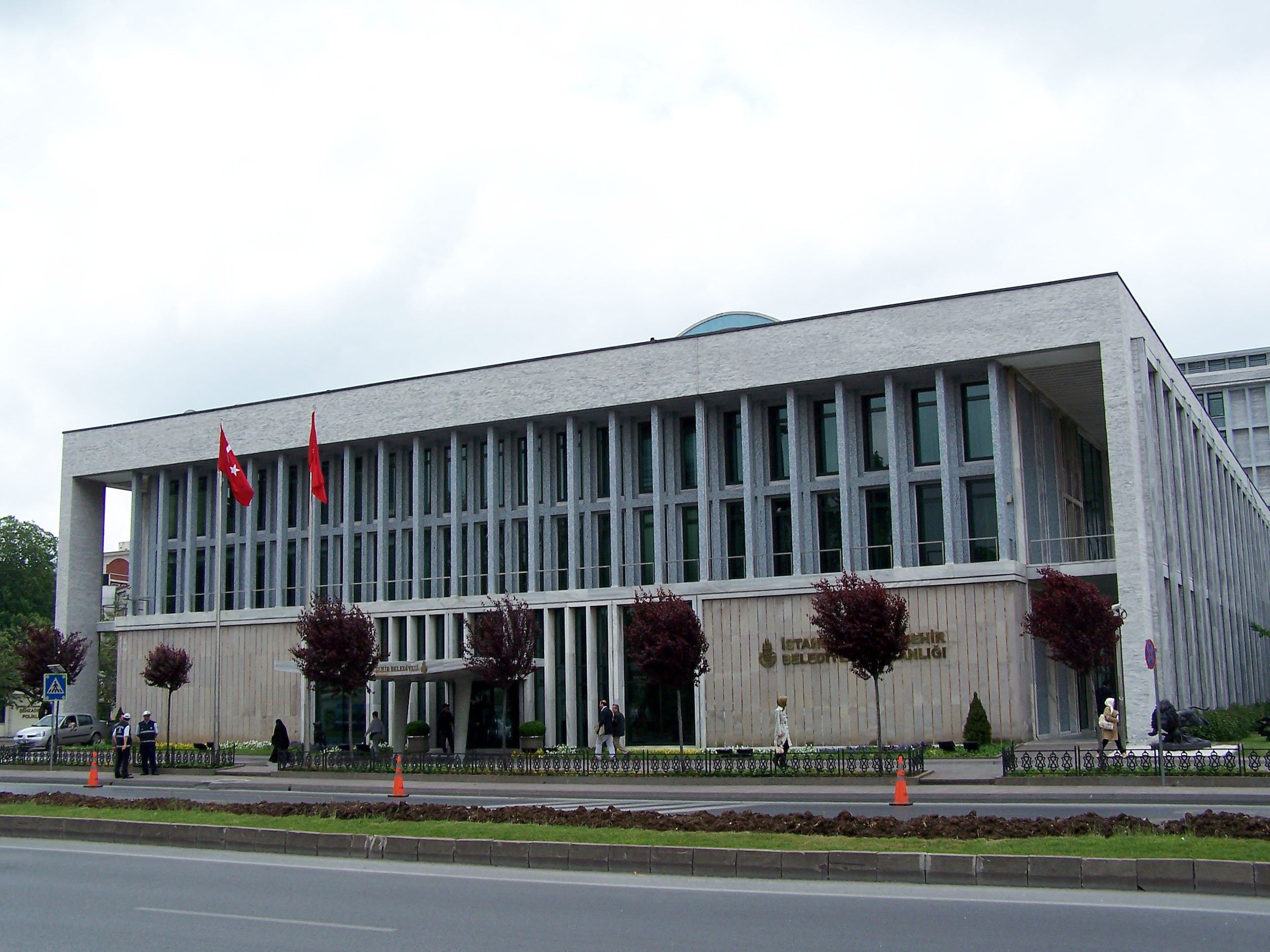
Istanbul Metropolitan Municipality City Hall was designed in 1953 by Nevzat Erol.

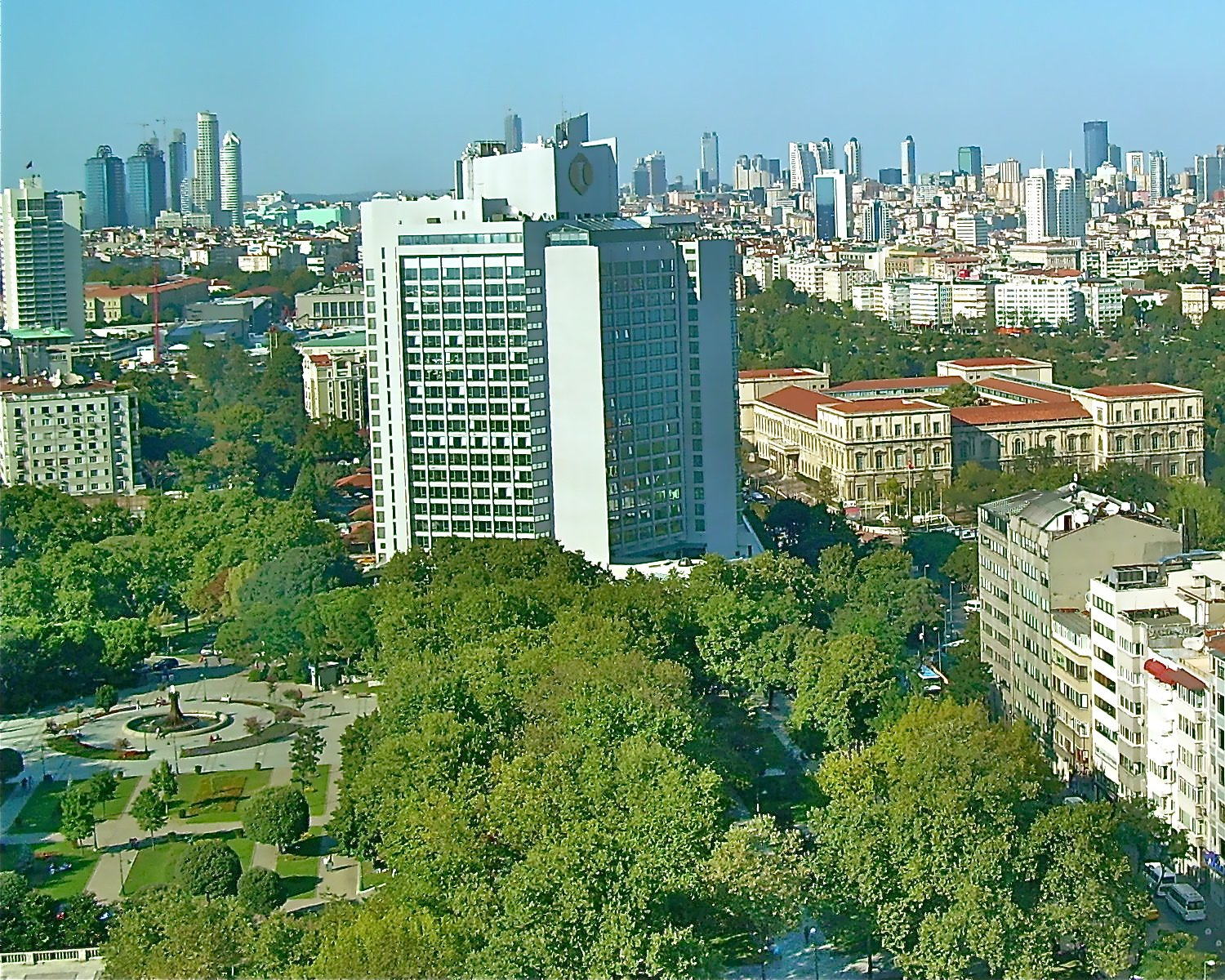
InterContinental Hotel, formerly Sheraton Istanbul, was designed in 1959 by AHE and Rolf Gutbrod.

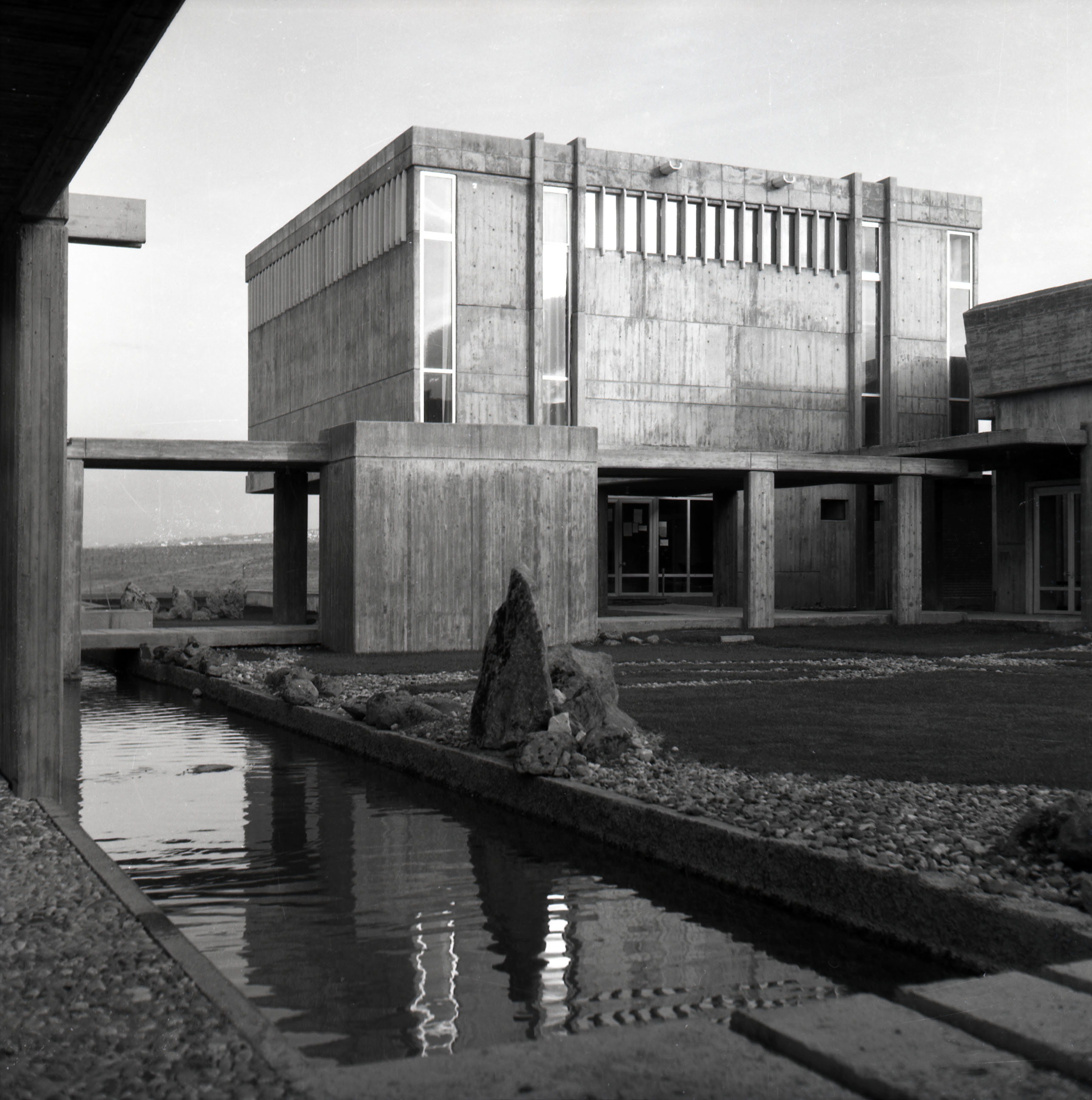
Middle East Technical University Faculty of Architecture

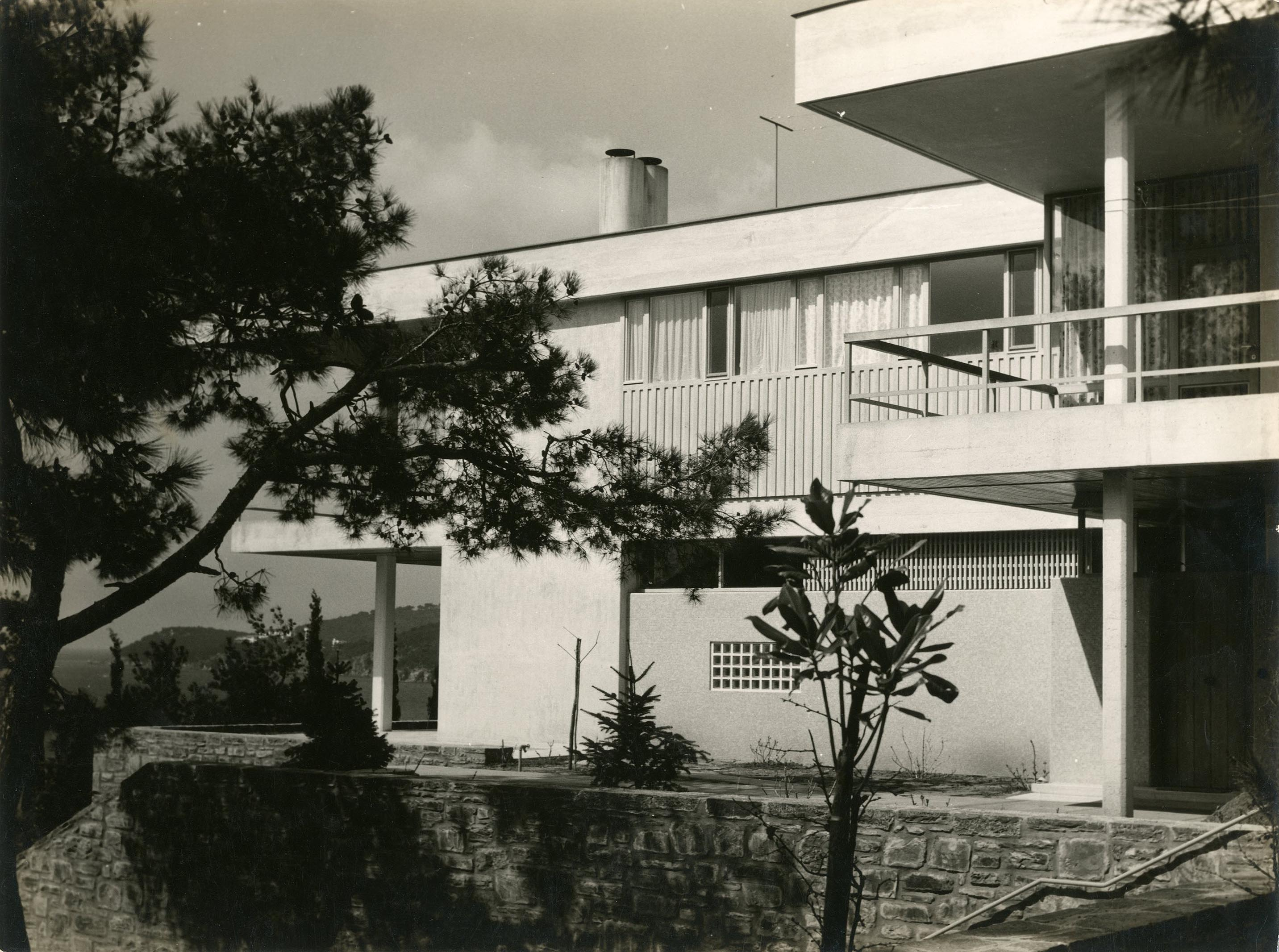
Rıza Derviş House, also known as Derviş Manizade Mansion, built 1956–1957, is one of two buildings designed by Sedad Hakkı Eldem that was realized on Büyükada

== 1960s and 1970s ==
Following the 1960 coup d'état, Turkey endured various kinds of political and economic crises which affected the construction industry as well as the architectural sector. Despite these hardships, architects were able to design some important buildings. Abandoning Rationalism, Turkish architects tried to design their buildings in more flexible and fragmented forms. Important works from this period are the Vakıflar Hotel in Istanbul (1968, today the Ceylan Intercontinental Hotel), Middle East Technical University Campuses (1961) in Ankara, Istanbul Manufacturers' Market (1959), Turkish Historical Society Building (1967), Grand Ankara Hotel (1960, today the Rixos Grand Ankara Hotel) and Atatürk Cultural Center (1969) in Istanbul.

As a result of economic and social turbulence, architecture in Turkey suffered also in the 1970s. There were no significant breakthroughs during this period. Some important designs from the 1970s are the Turkish Language Association Building (1972), Atatürk Library (1973) and Abdi İpekçi Arena (1979).

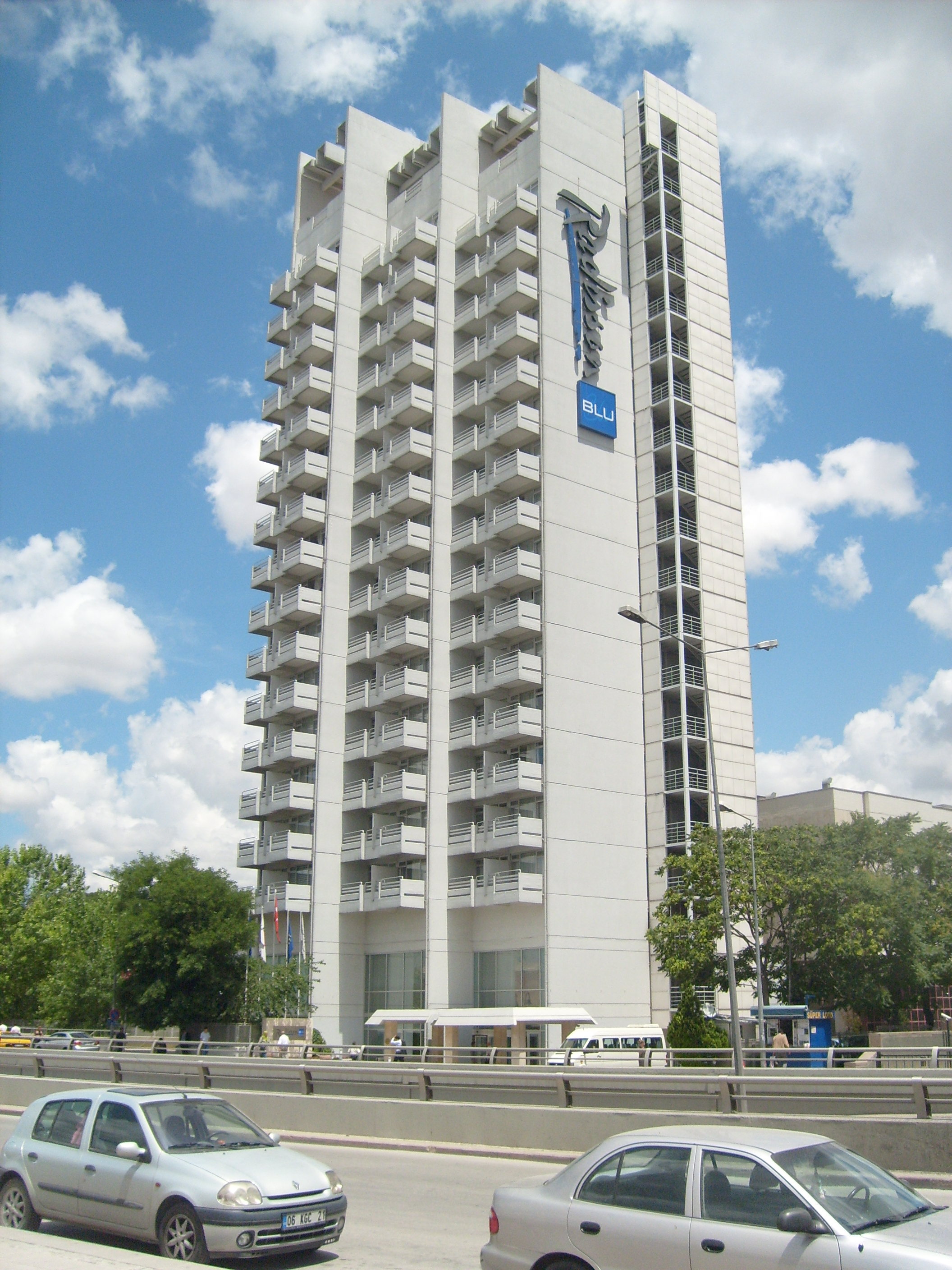
Radisson Blu Hotel in Ankara, originally built as Stad Oteli (1970), was designed in 1964 by Doğan Tekeli, Sami Sisa and Metin Hepgüler.

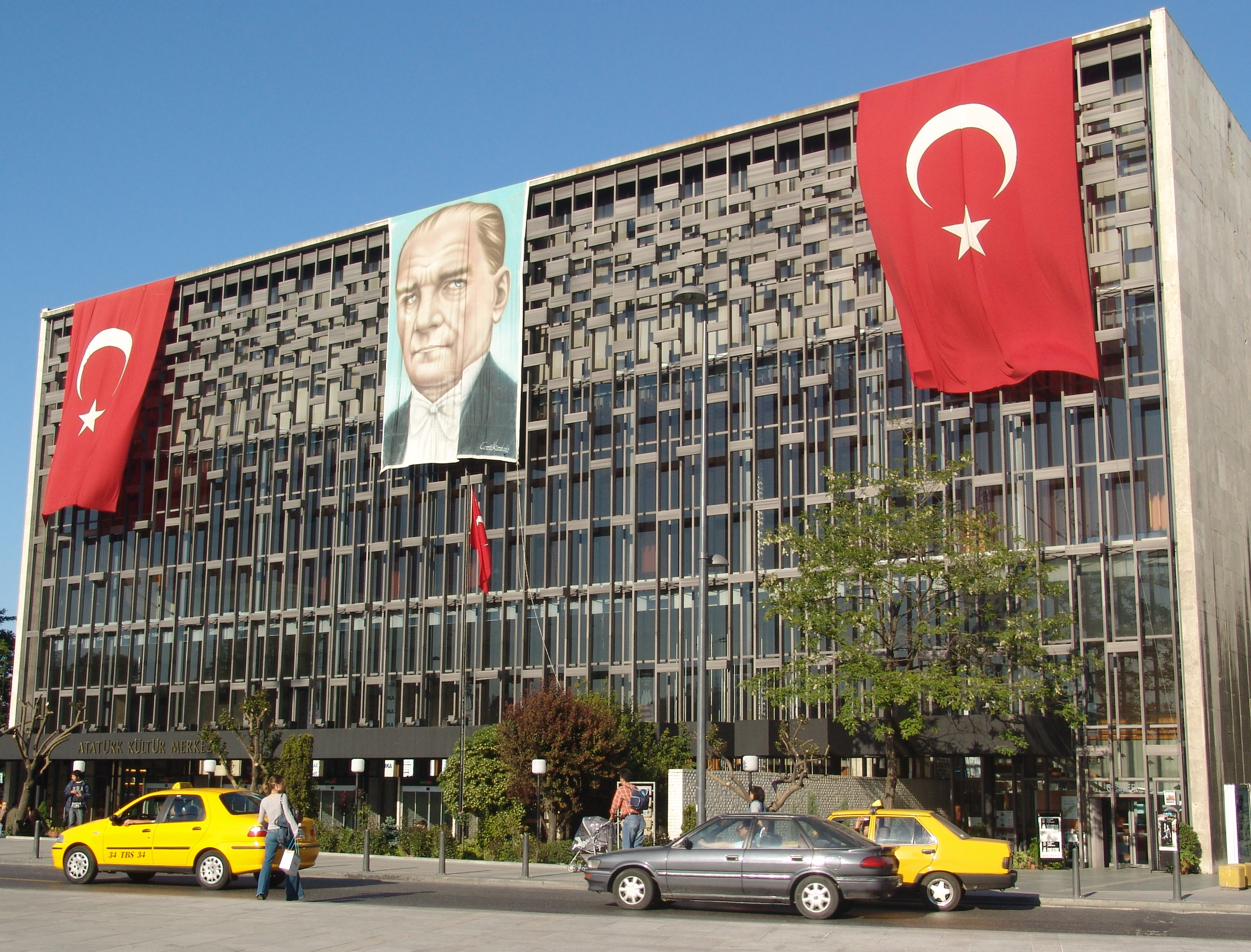
Atatürk Cultural Center (1969) on Taksim Square in Istanbul, designed by Hayati Tabanlıoğlu.

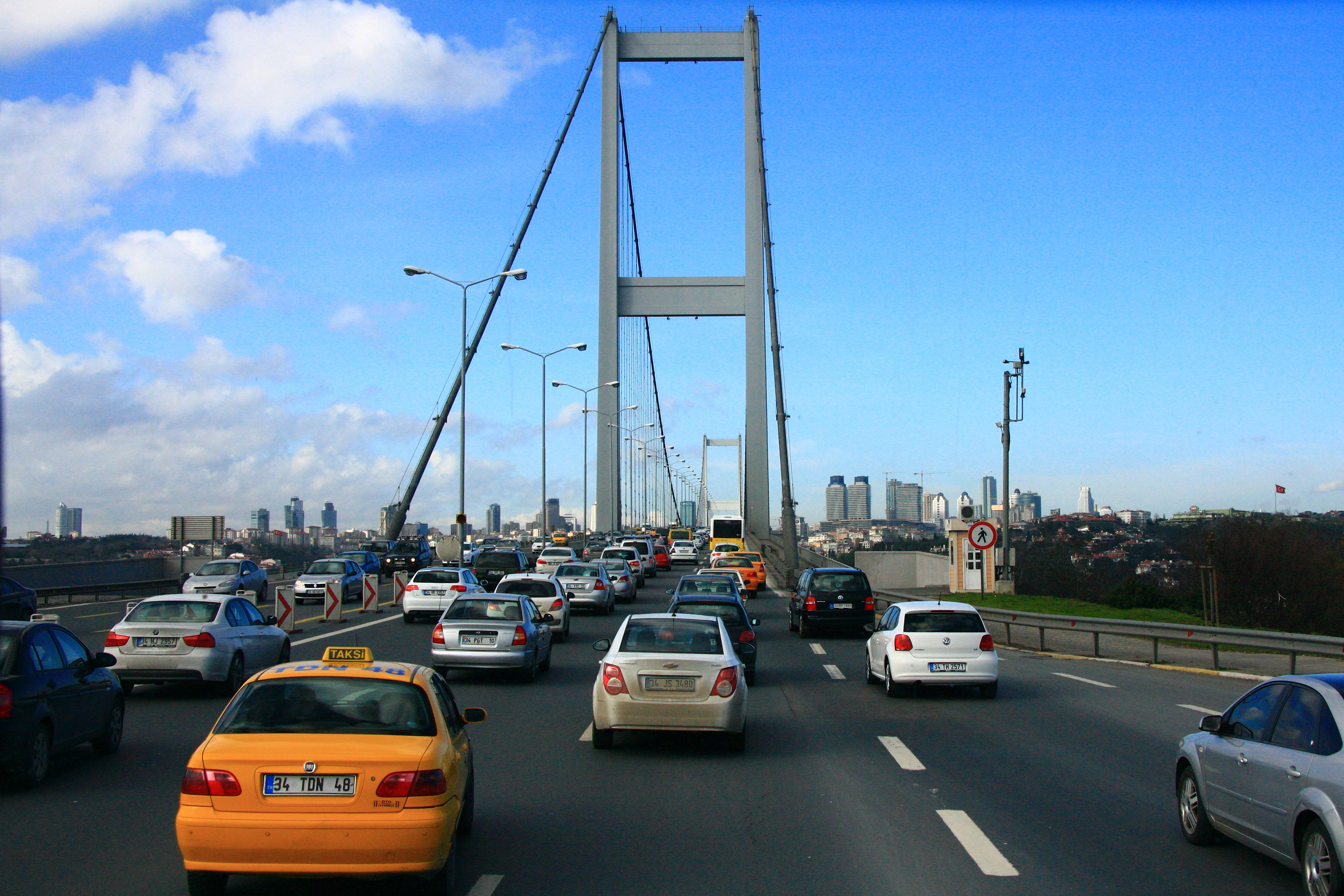
The Bosphorus Bridge (1973) in Istanbul was designed in 1968–1970 by Gilbert Roberts and William Brown.

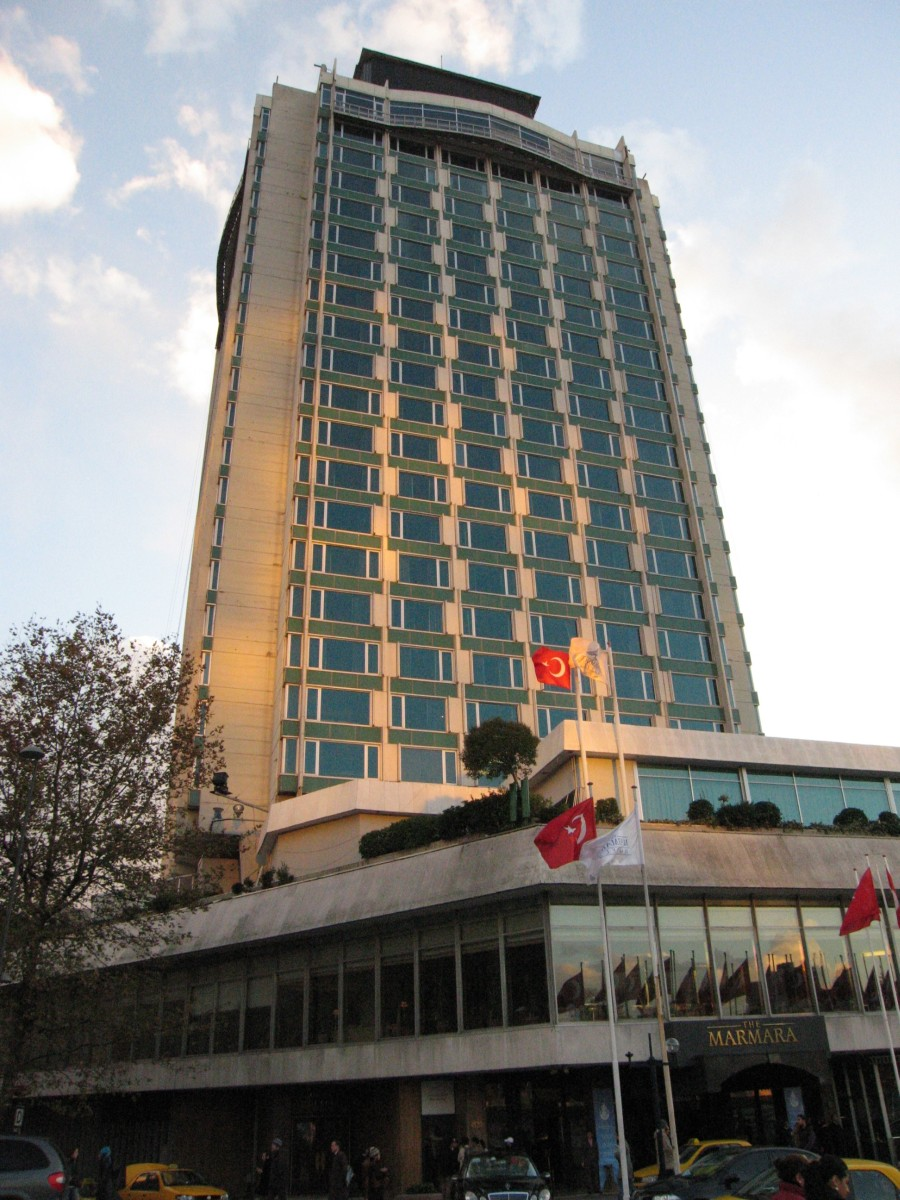
The Marmara Hotel (1976) at Taksim Square was designed in 1972 by Fatin Uran.

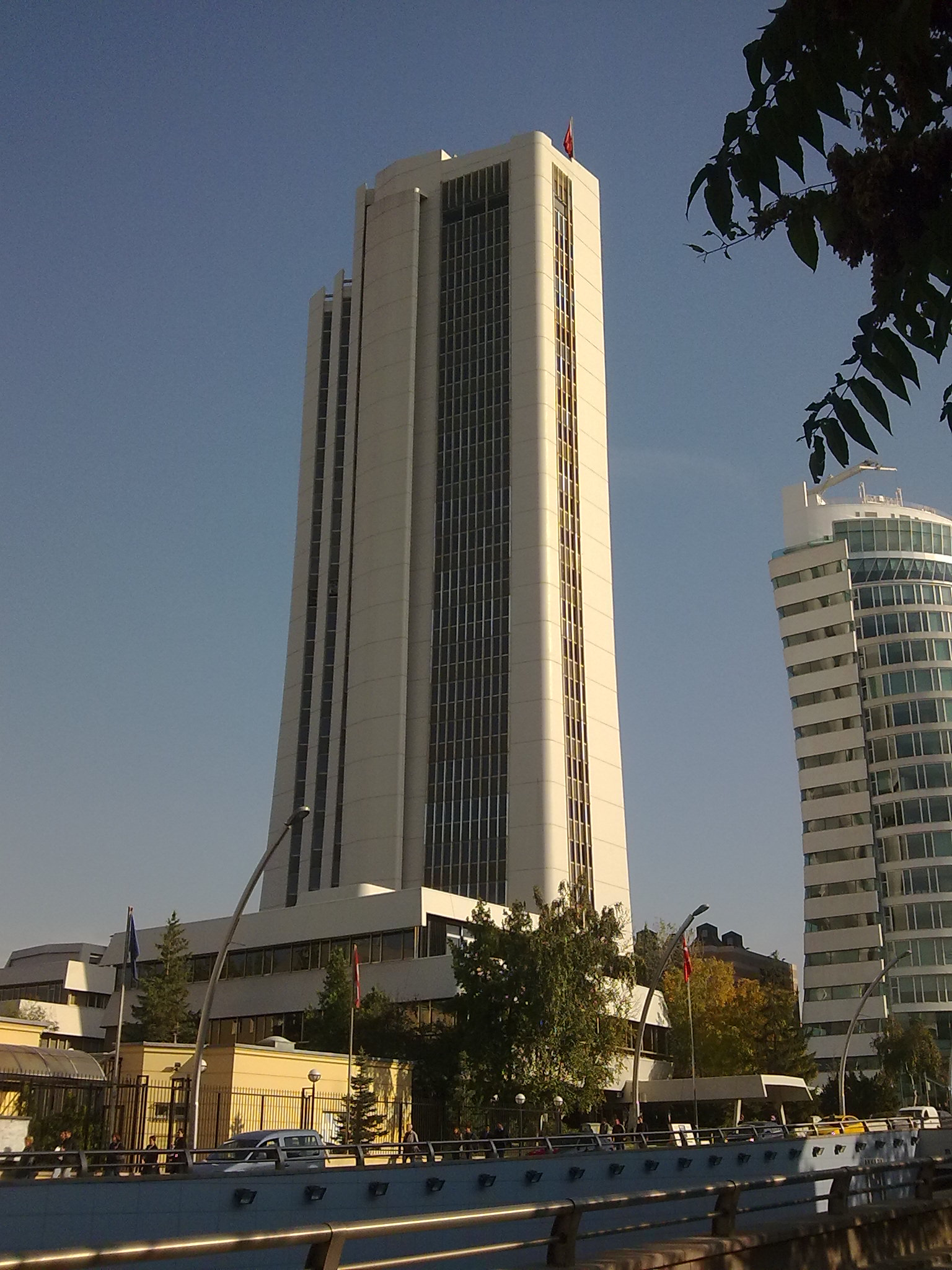
BDDK Building (1975) in Ankara, originally the Türkiye İş Bankası headquarters, designed by Ayhan Böke and Yılmaz Sargın.

== 1980s and 1990s ==
In January 1980, the government of Prime Minister Süleyman Demirel began implementing a far-reaching reform program designed by then Undersecretary of the Prime Ministry Turgut Özal to shift Turkey's economy toward export-led growth. These reforms had a positive effect on the construction industry and architecture. New methods such as prefabrication and curtain wall systems were introduced to Turkish architects and contractors in the 1980s. In addition, steel, aluminum, plastic and glass production increased, which allowed architects to free themselves from rigid forms.

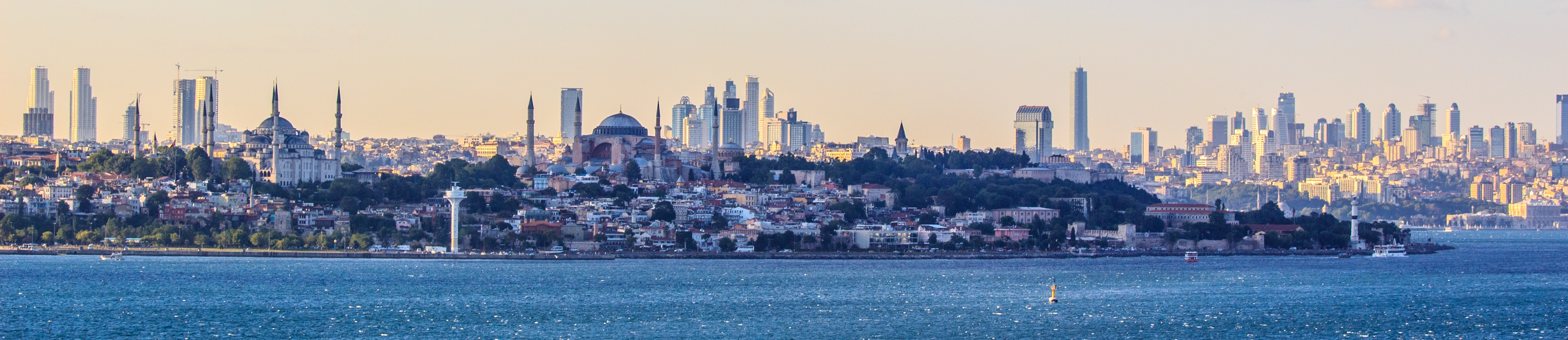
Panoramic view of Istanbul.

Until the 1980s, the government sector was the leading client when it came to architecture and construction. However, the liberalization of the economy paved the way for the private sector to become the leading influence. Notable architects from this period include Behruz Çinici, Merih Karaaslan, Sevinç Hadi, Şandor Hadi, Ersen Gürsel, Mehmet Çubuk, Doğan Tekeli, Sami Sisa, Emre Arolat, Murat Tabanlıoğlu, Melkan Tabanlıoğlu, Hüsrev Tayla, Doğan Hasol, Atilla Yücel, Sema Soygeniş, Murat Soygeniş and Kaya Arıkoğlu, among others.

== 21st century ==
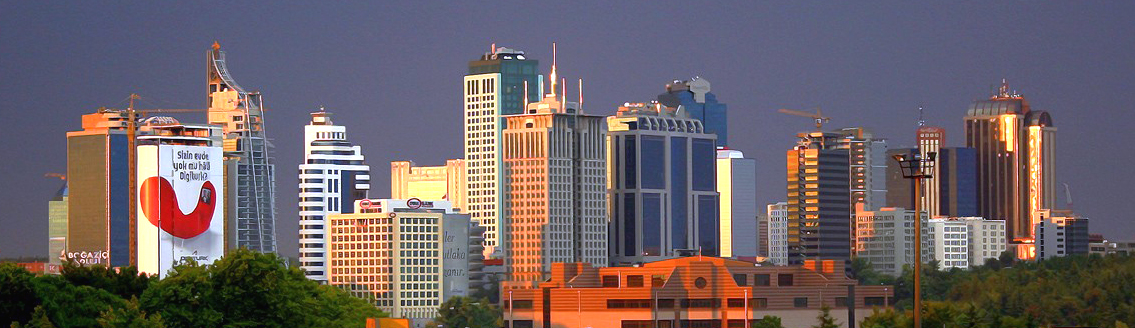
A view of Maslak business district in Istanbul, 2007. Istanbul's skyline has changed significantly since the 1990s.

When architects and structural engineers collaborate they can design buildings which are more sustainable.

Notable contemporary architects who were active in Turkey include Renzo Piano, who designed the Istanbul Museum of Modern Art, and Kengo Kuma, who designed the Odunpazarı Modern Arts Museum in Eskişehir.

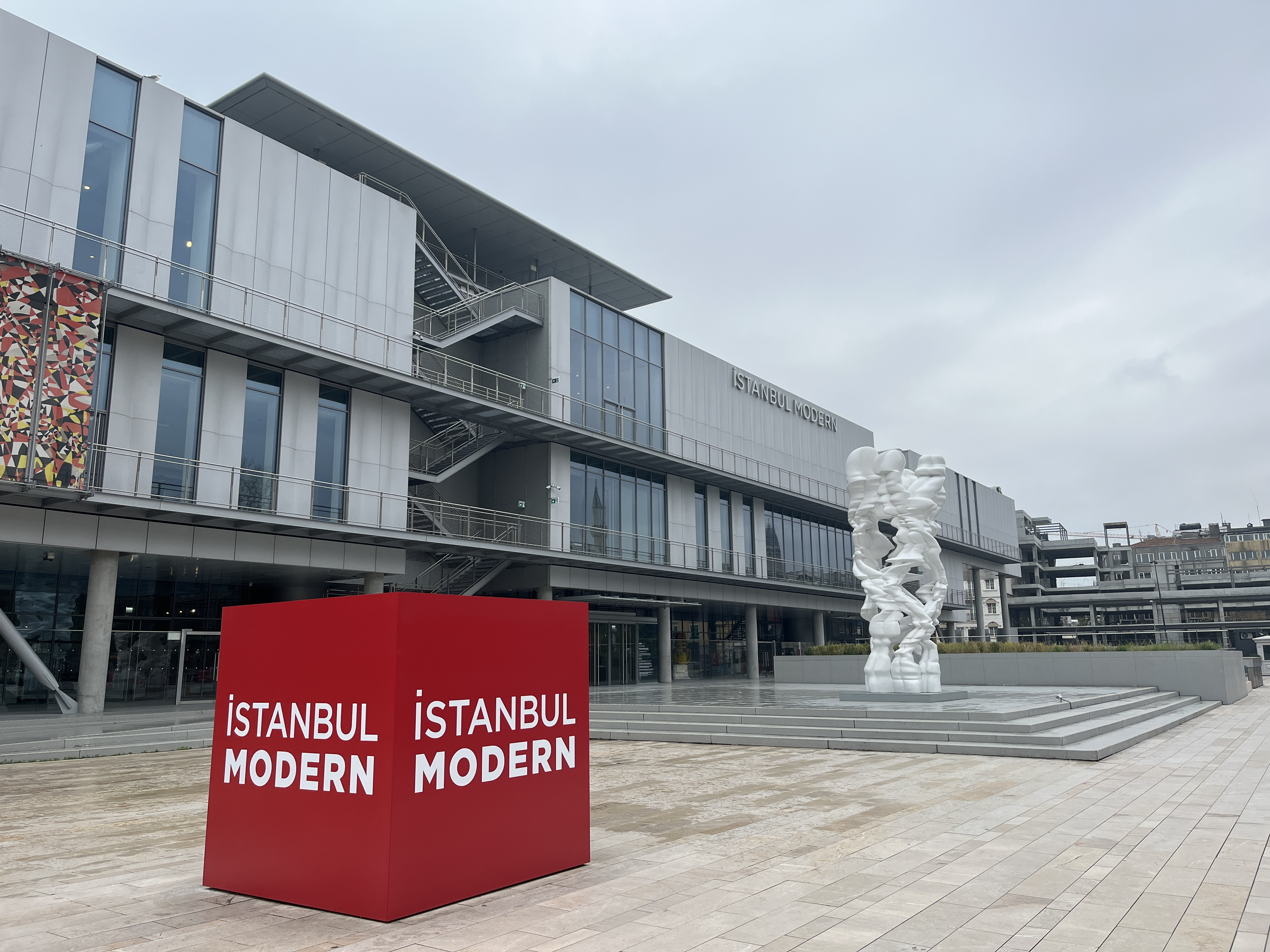
Istanbul Museum of Modern Art by Renzo Piano (2023)

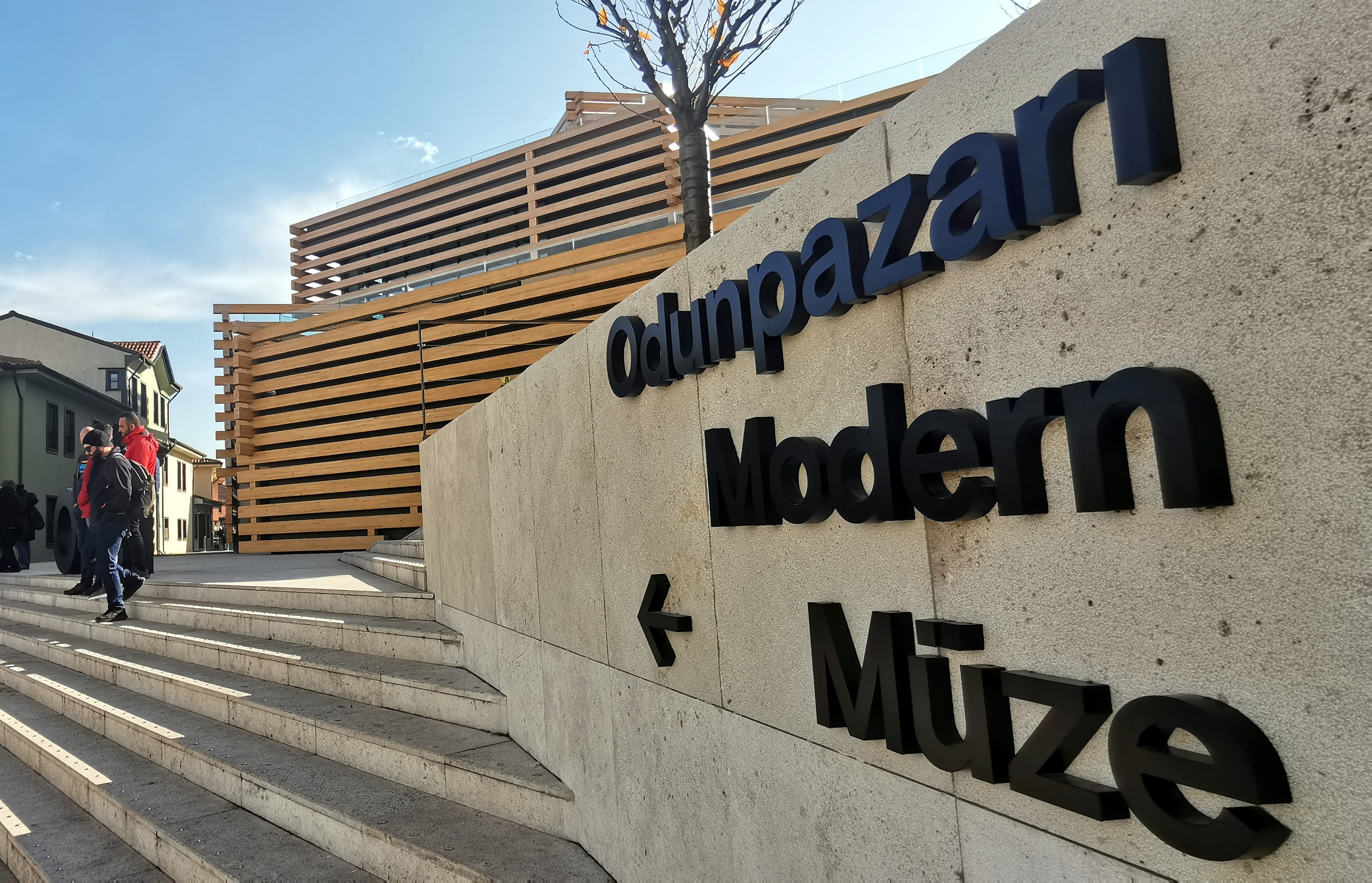
Odunpazarı Modern Arts Museum in Eskişehir by Kengo Kuma (2019)

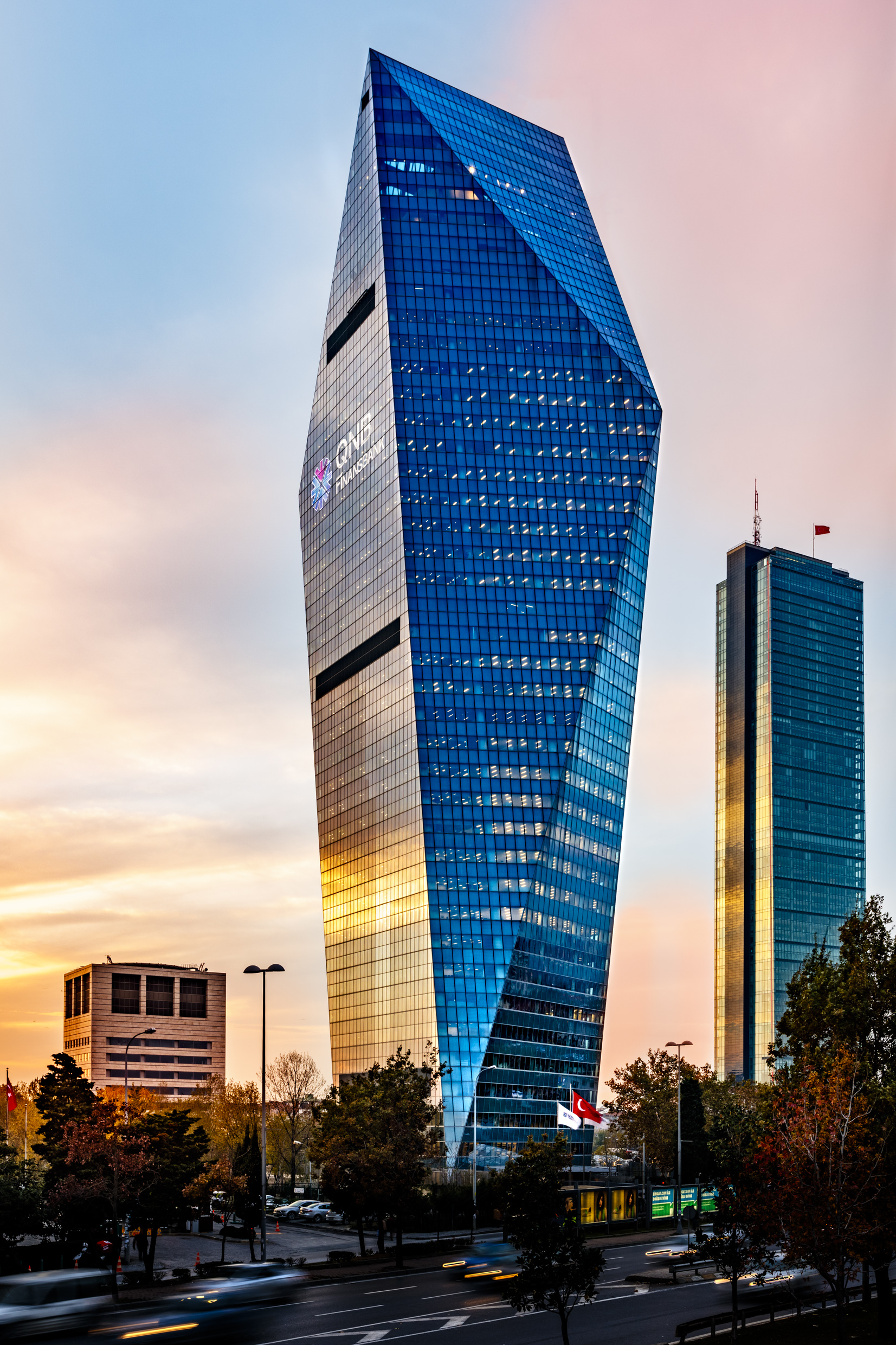
Finansbank Tower and Istanbul Sapphire on Büyükdere Avenue in Levent

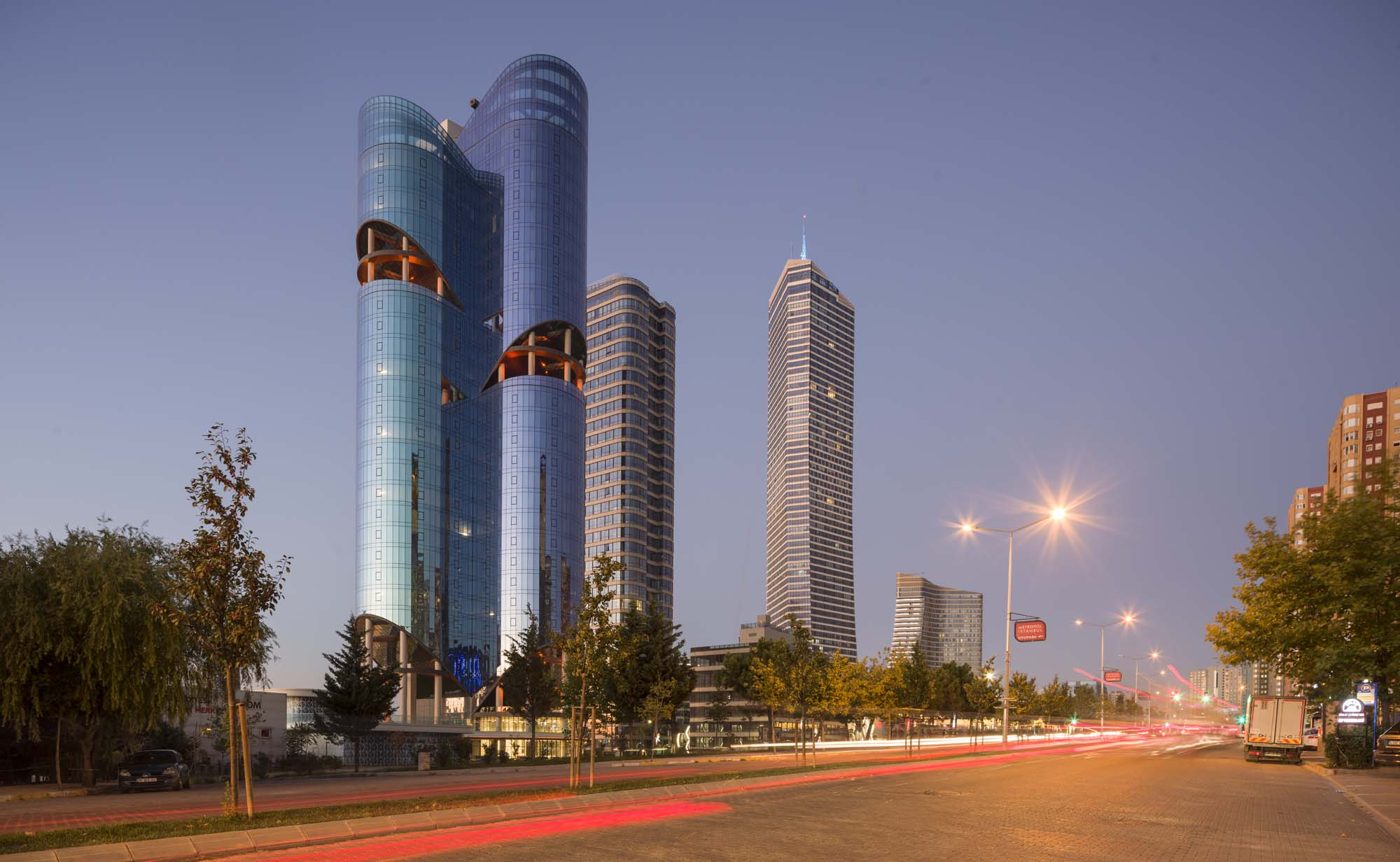
Avrupa Office in Ataşehir

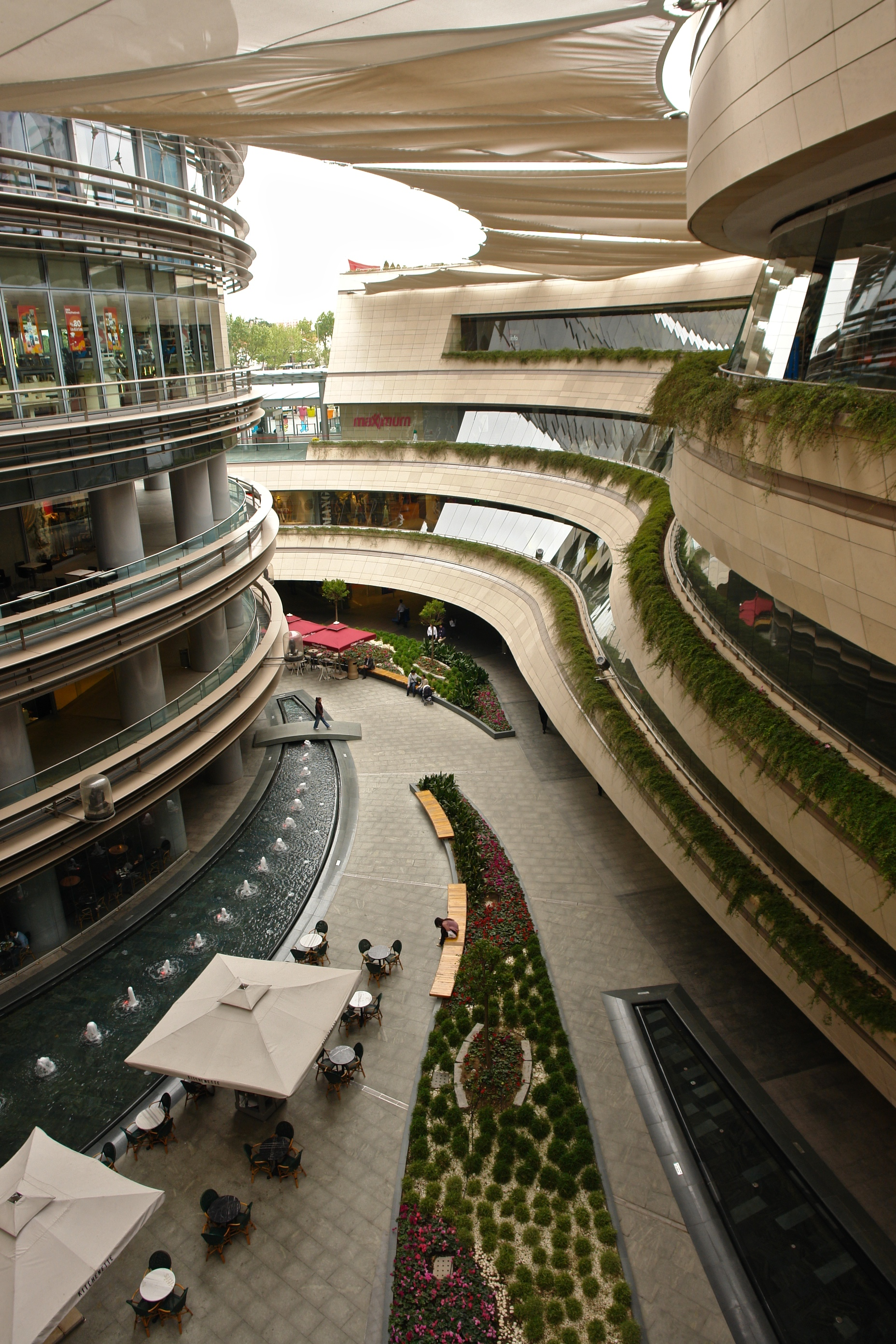
Kanyon Shopping Mall

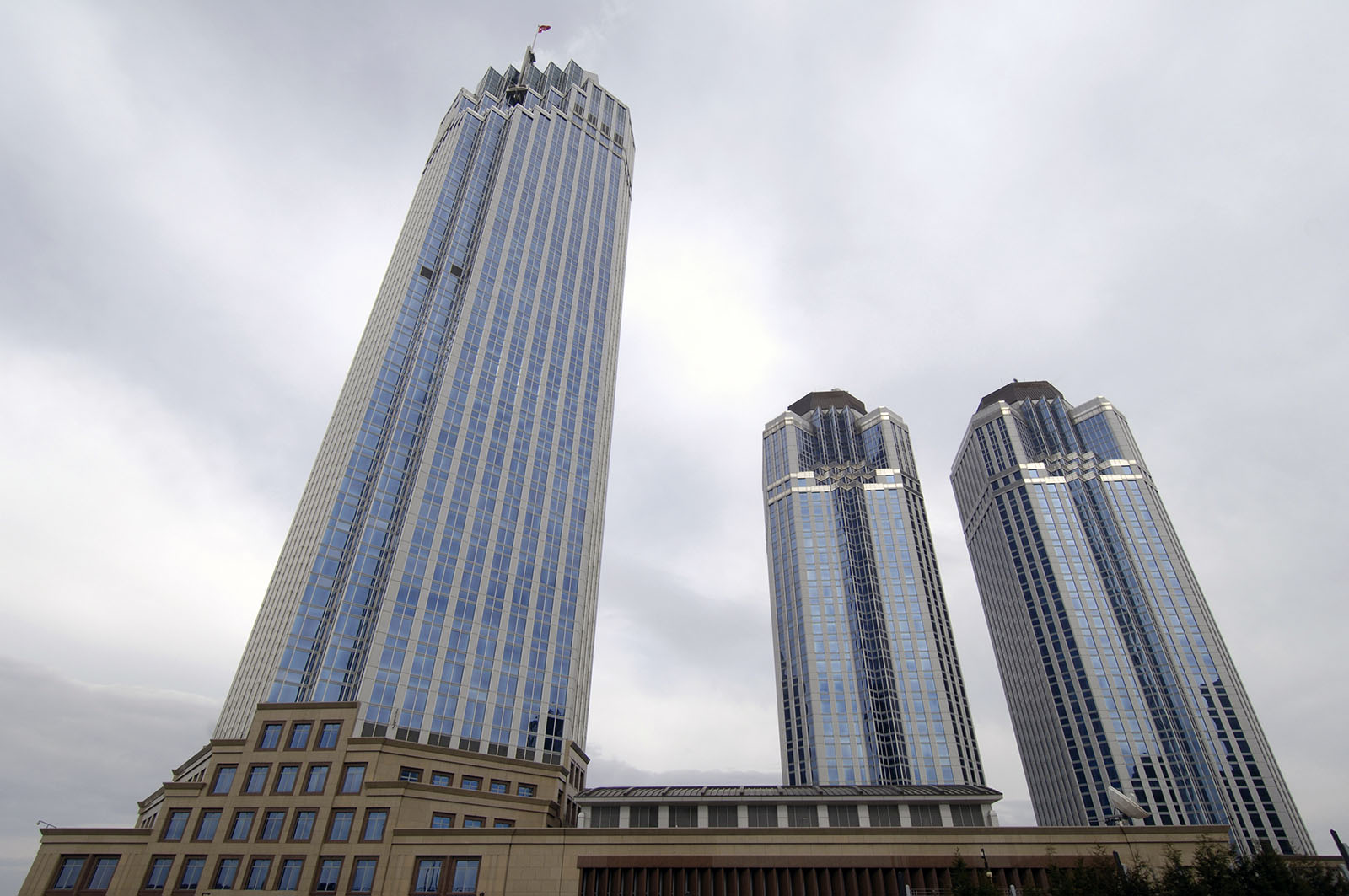
Türkiye İş Bankası Towers (1995–2000) in Levent, Istanbul

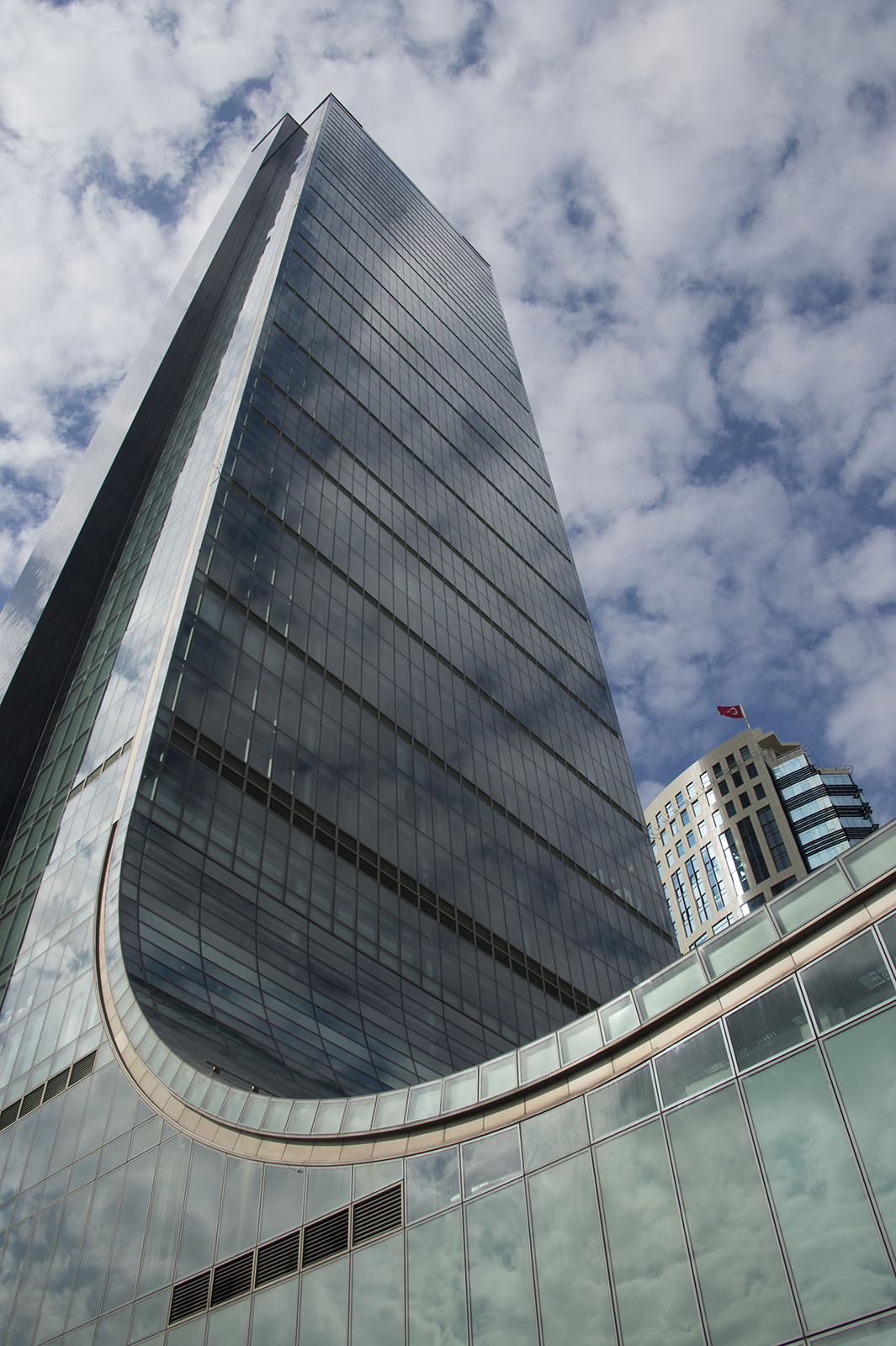
Istanbul Sapphire in Levent

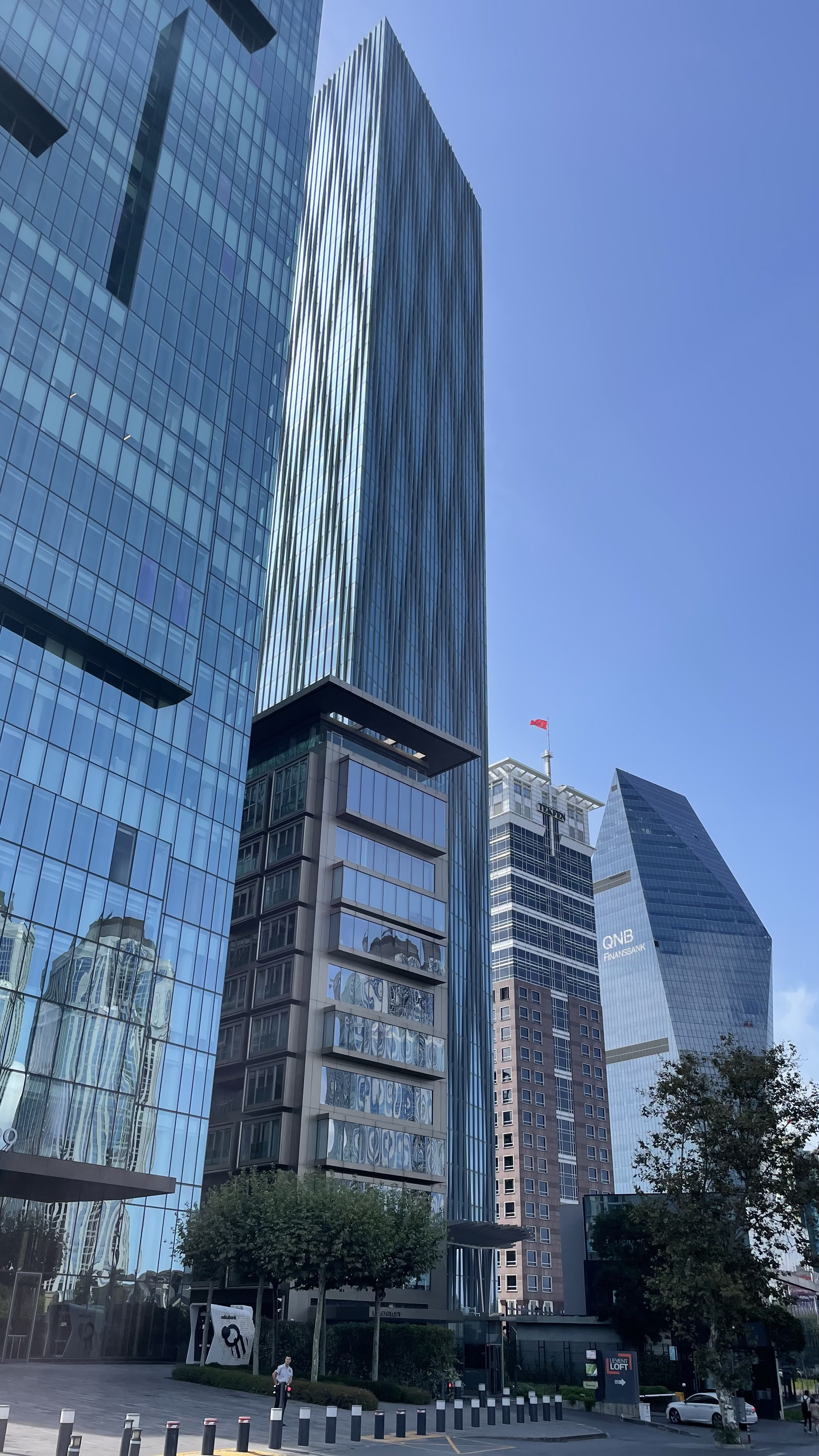
Istanbul Tower 205 (center) in Levent

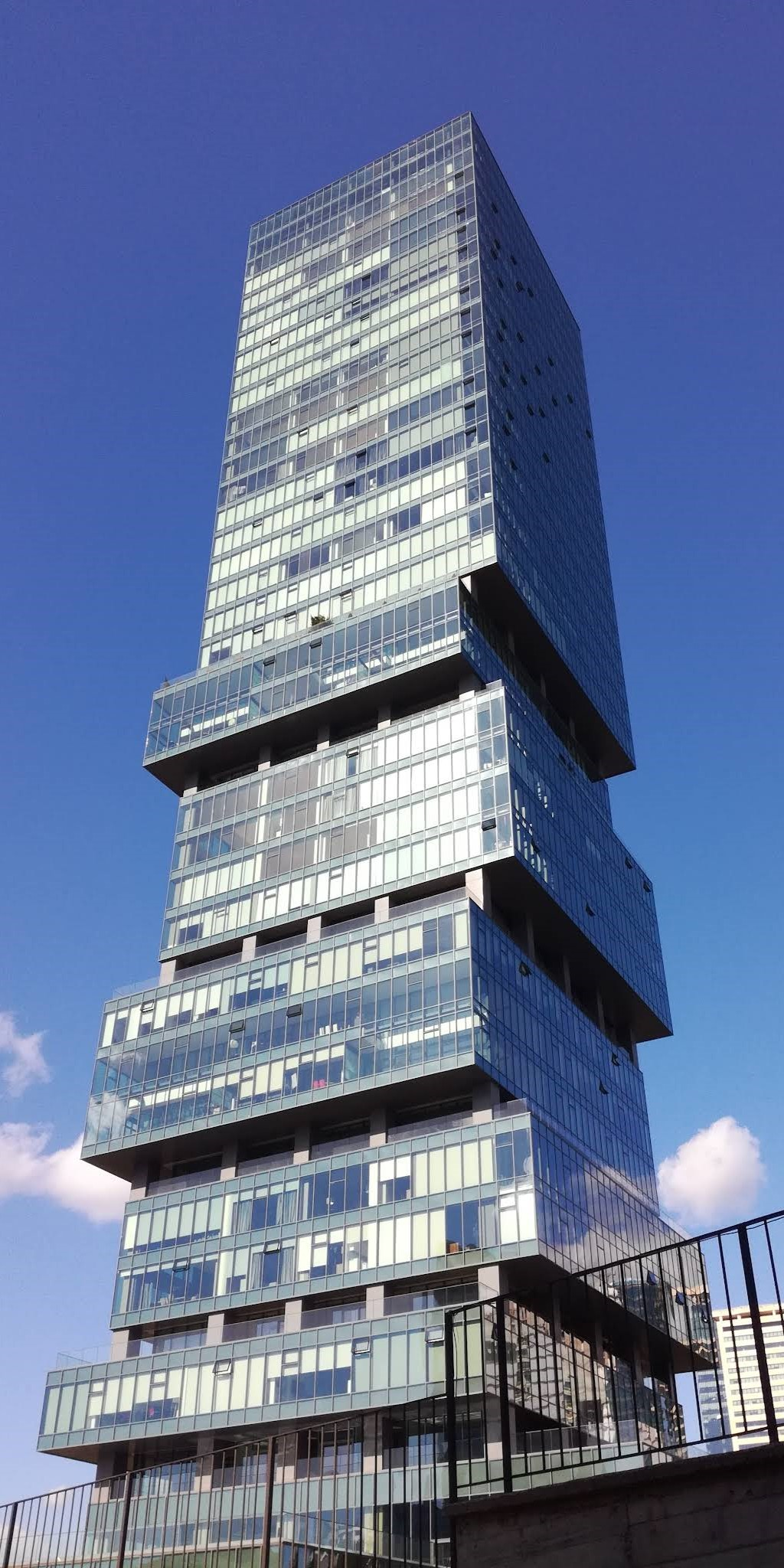
Istanbloom Residence

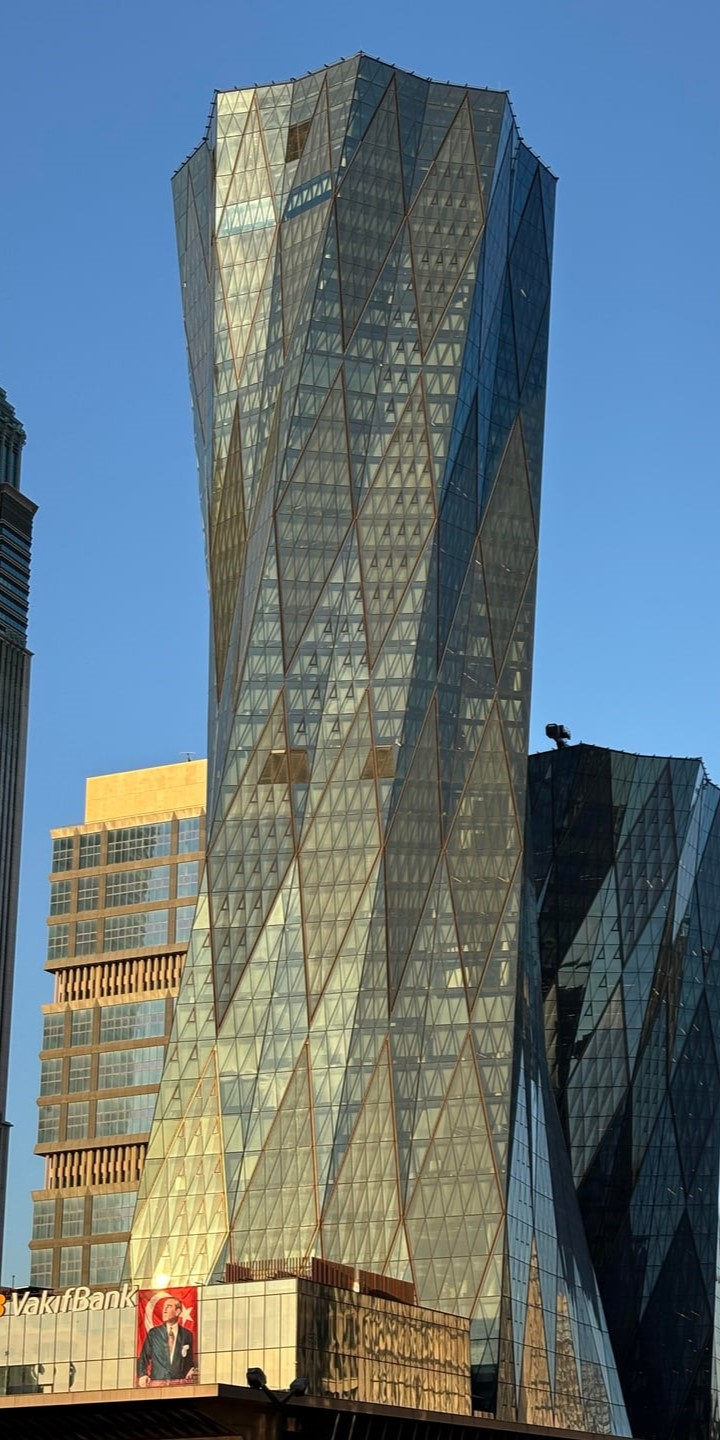
Vakıf Bank Tower 1, IFC, Istanbul

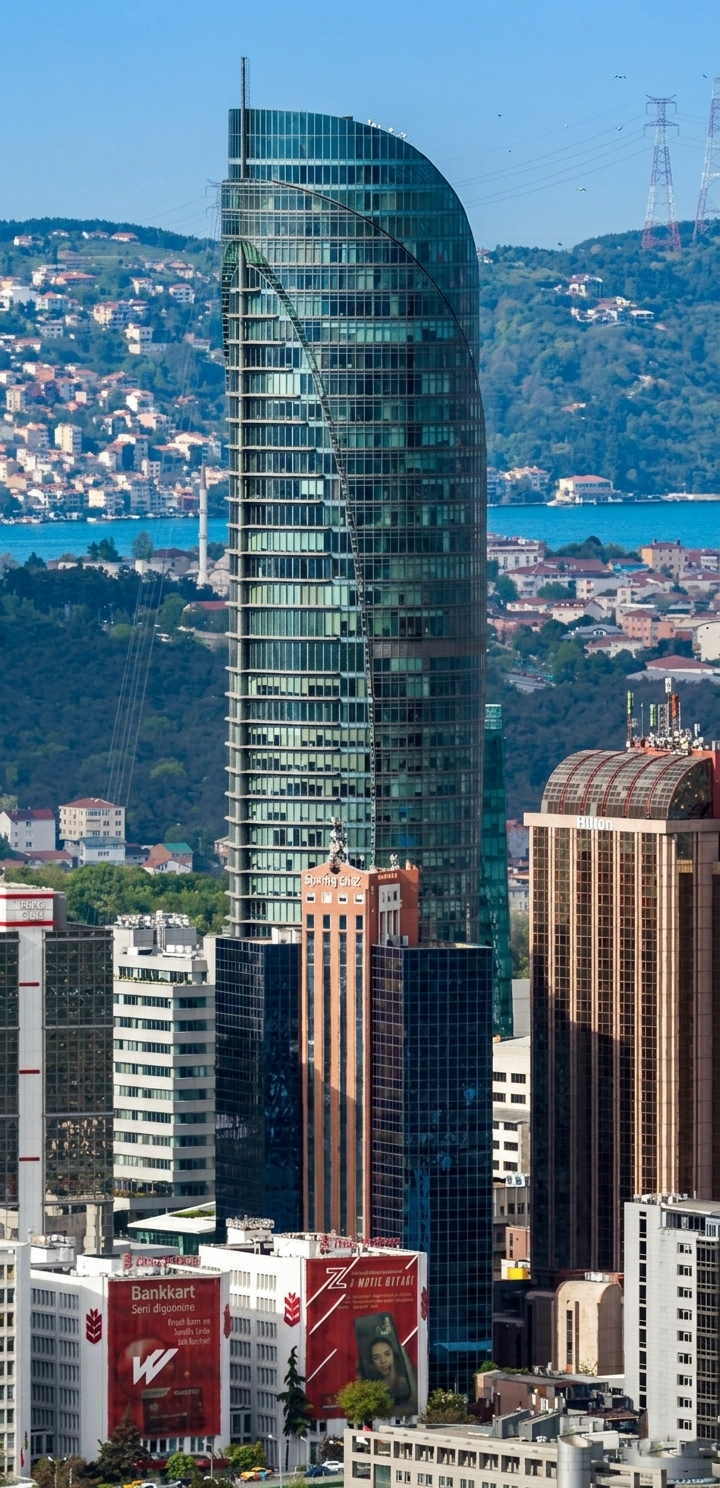
Spine Tower, Maslak, Istanbul

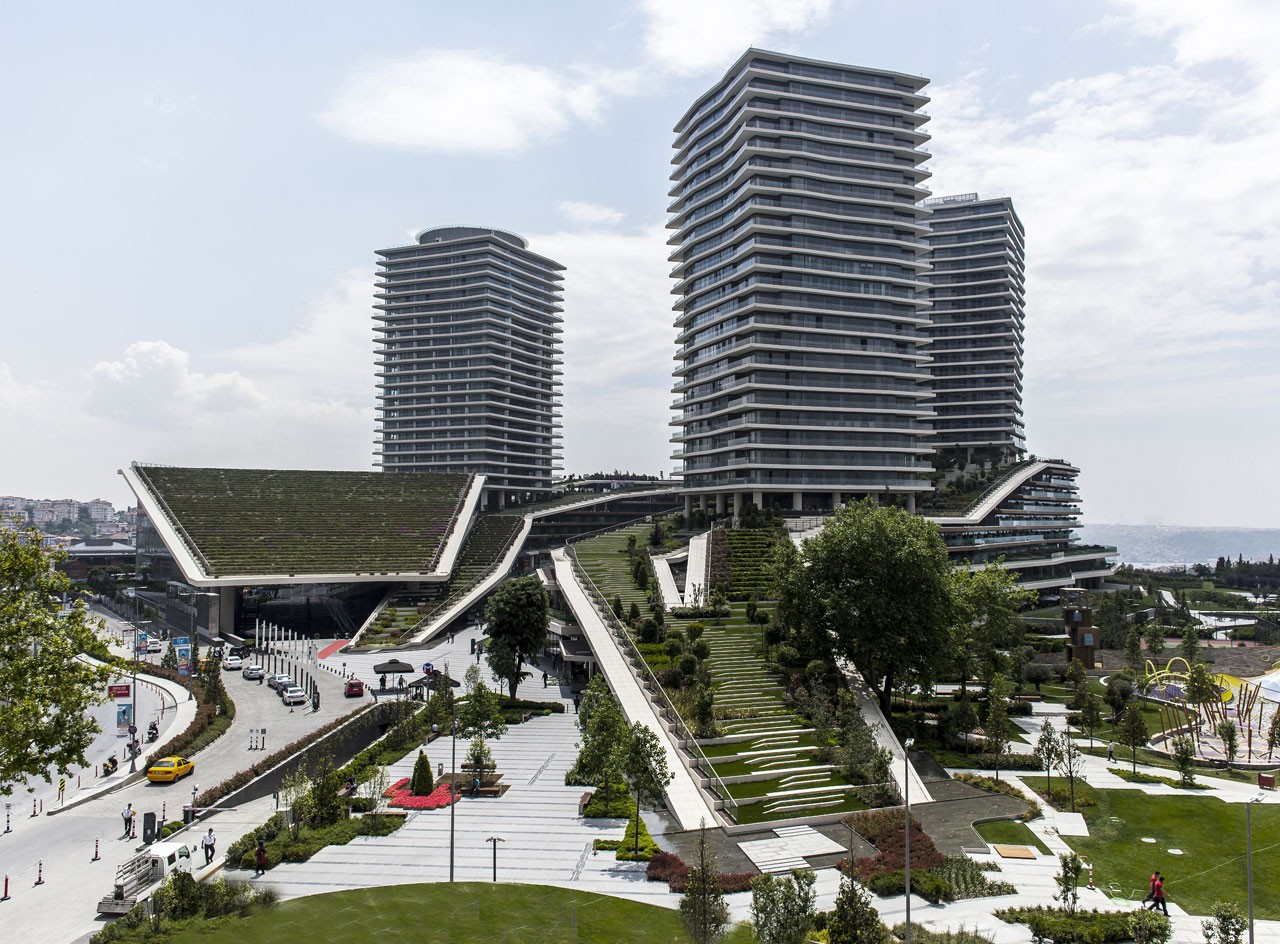
Zorlu Center, Istanbul (2013)

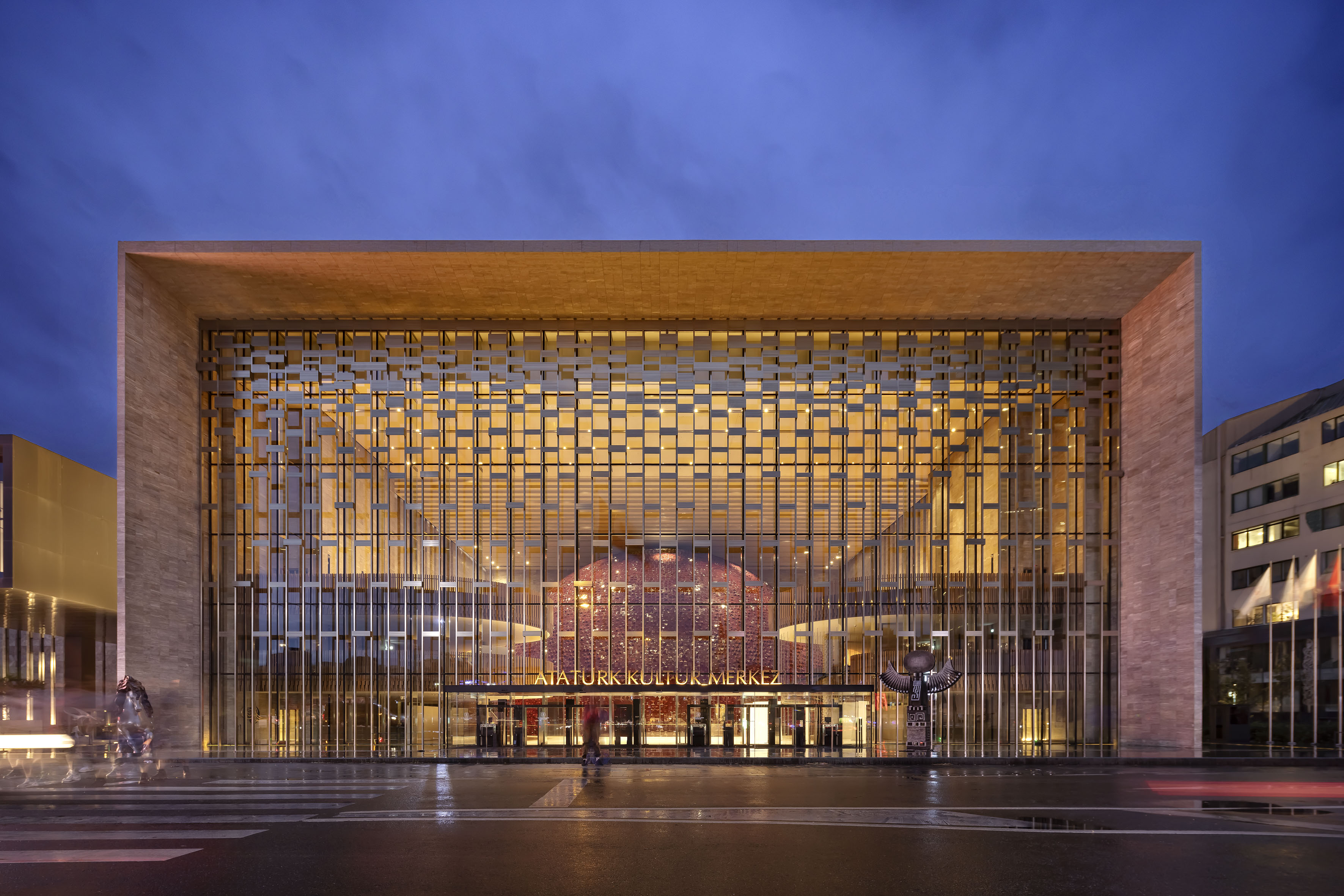
The new Atatürk Cultural Center (2021), Taksim Square, Istanbul

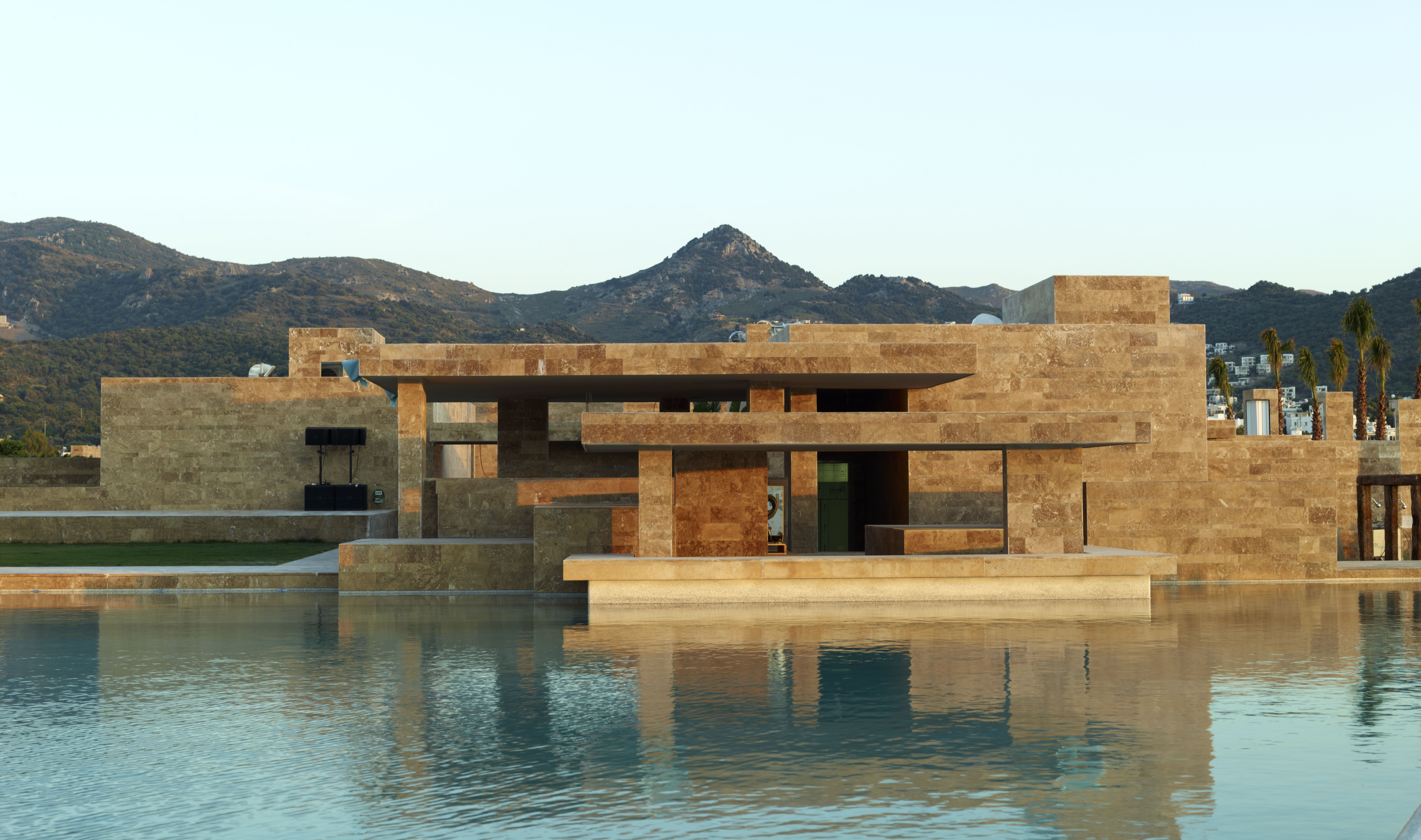
Yalikavak Palmarina, Bodrum (2014)

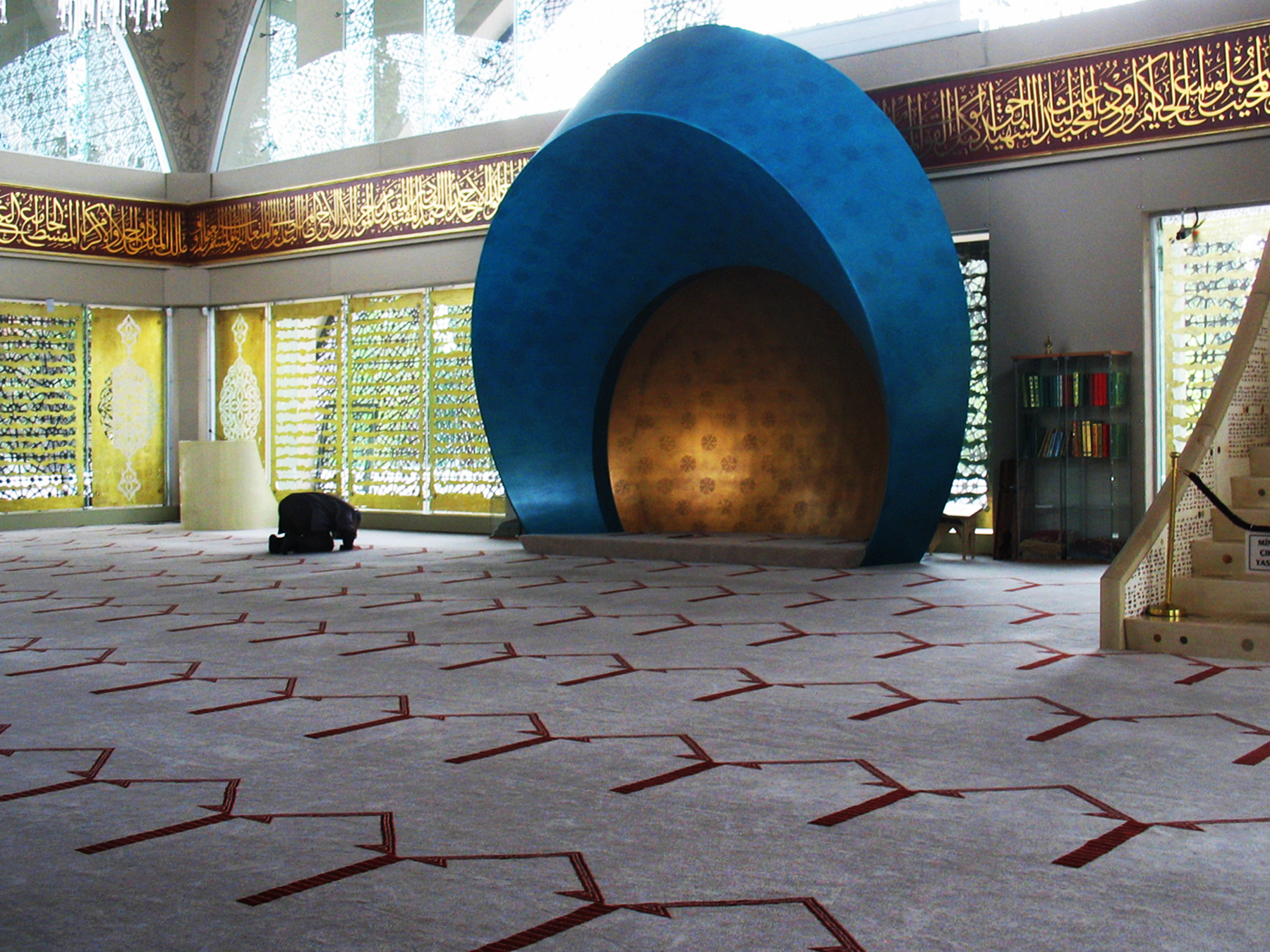
Sakirin Mosque, The mosque's architect is believed to be the first woman to design a mosque. (2009)

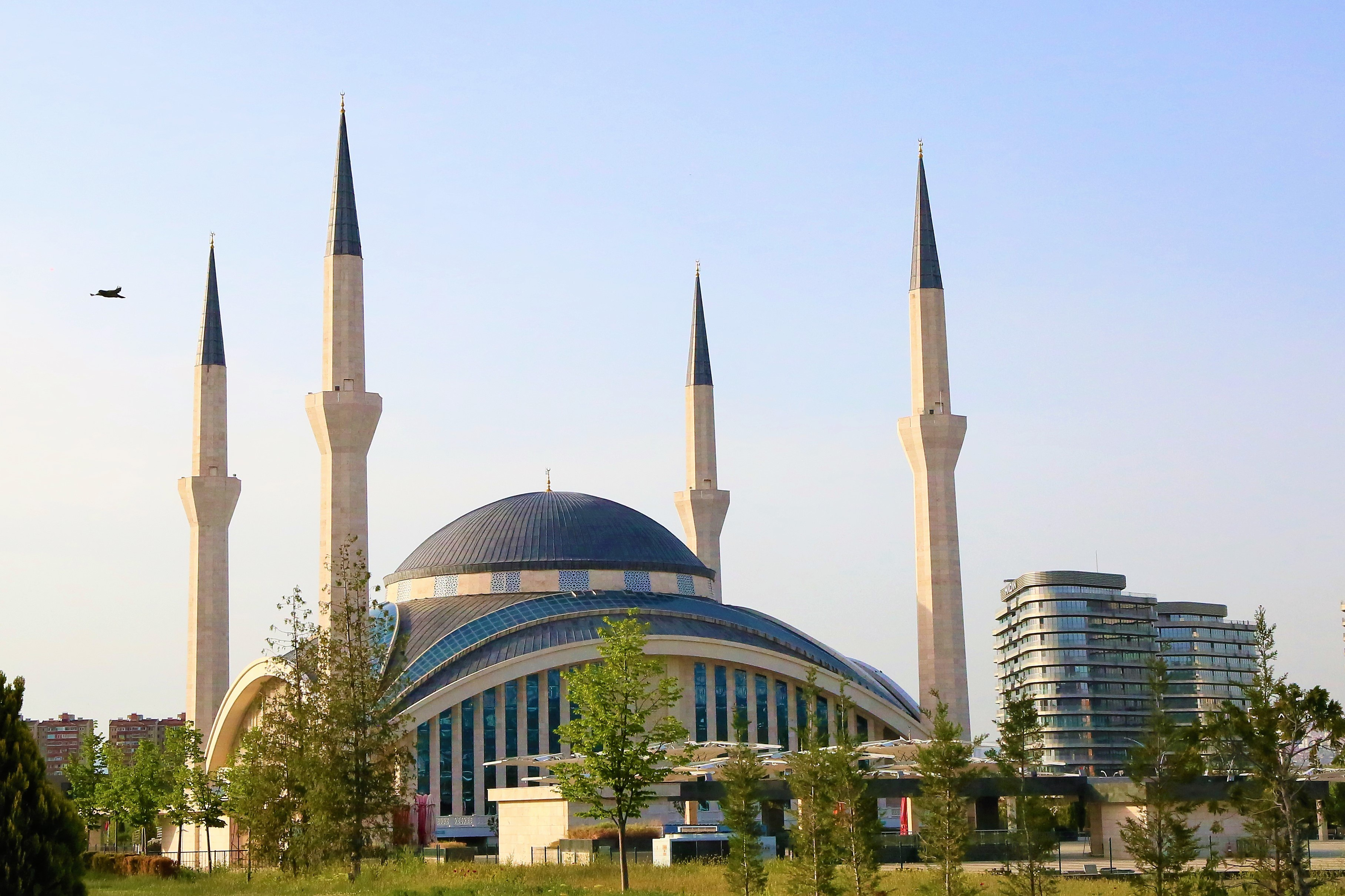
Ahmed Hamdi Akseki Mosque

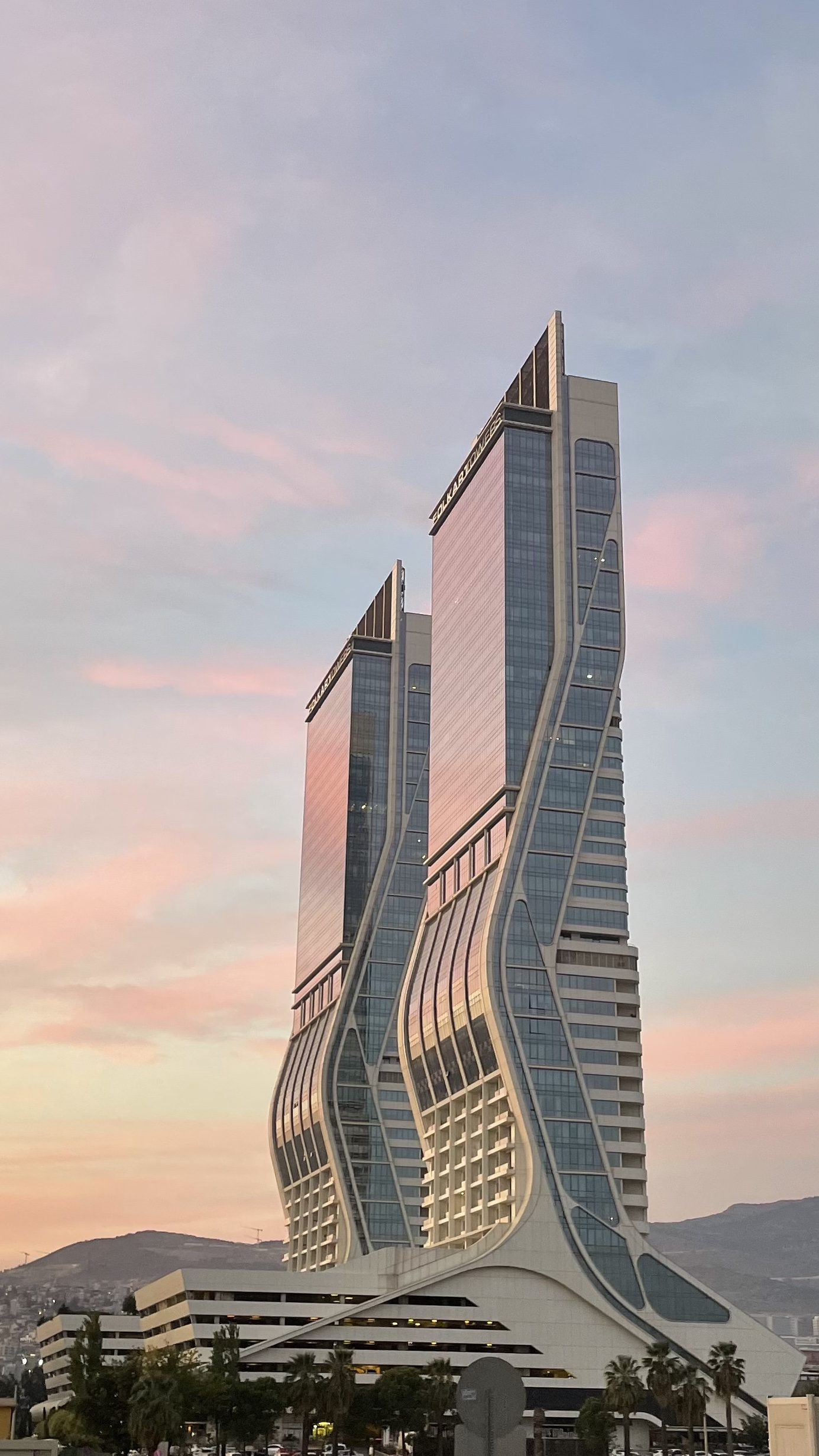
İzmir Folkart Towers

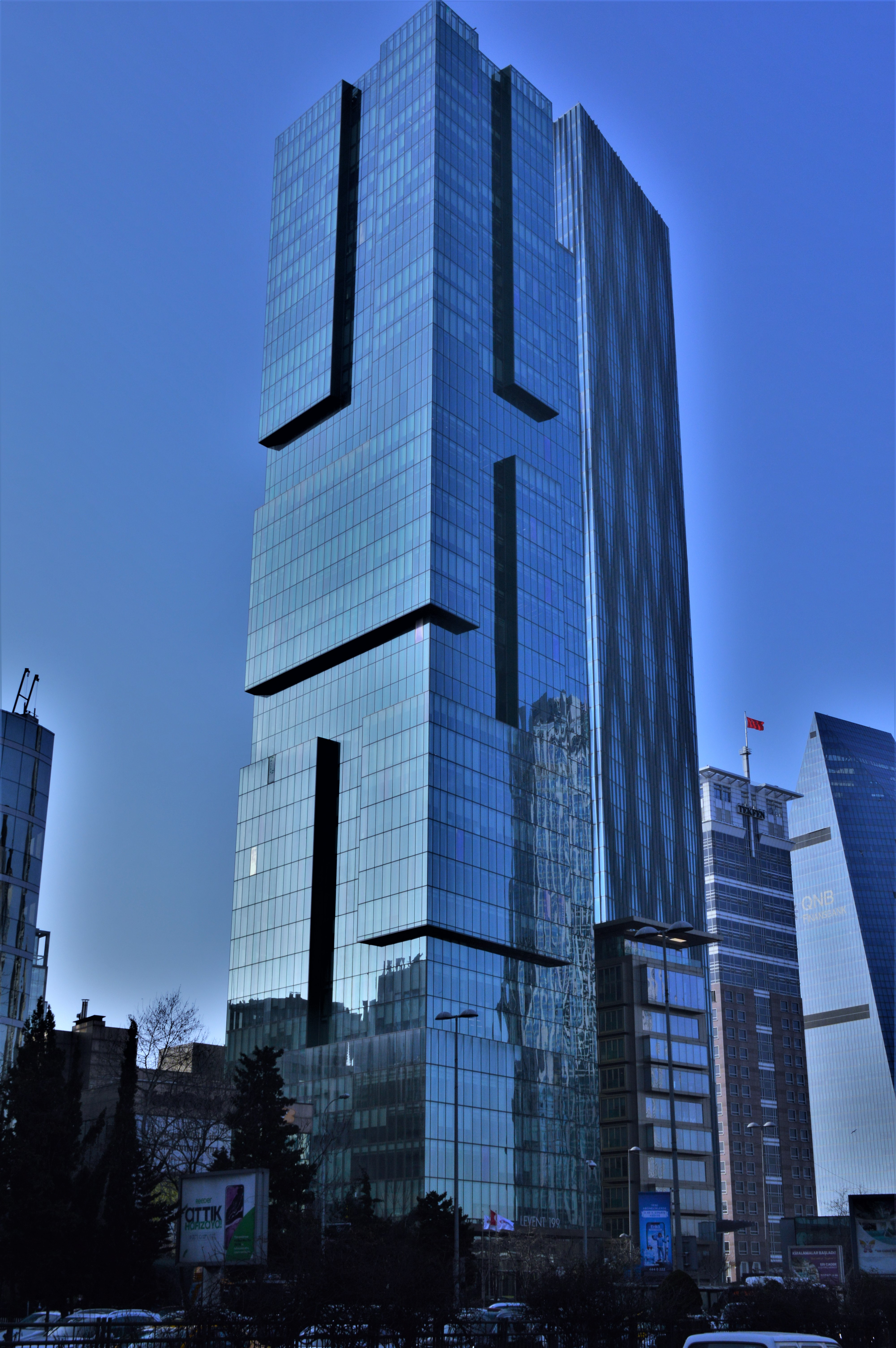
Levent 199 on Büyükdere Avenue, Levent

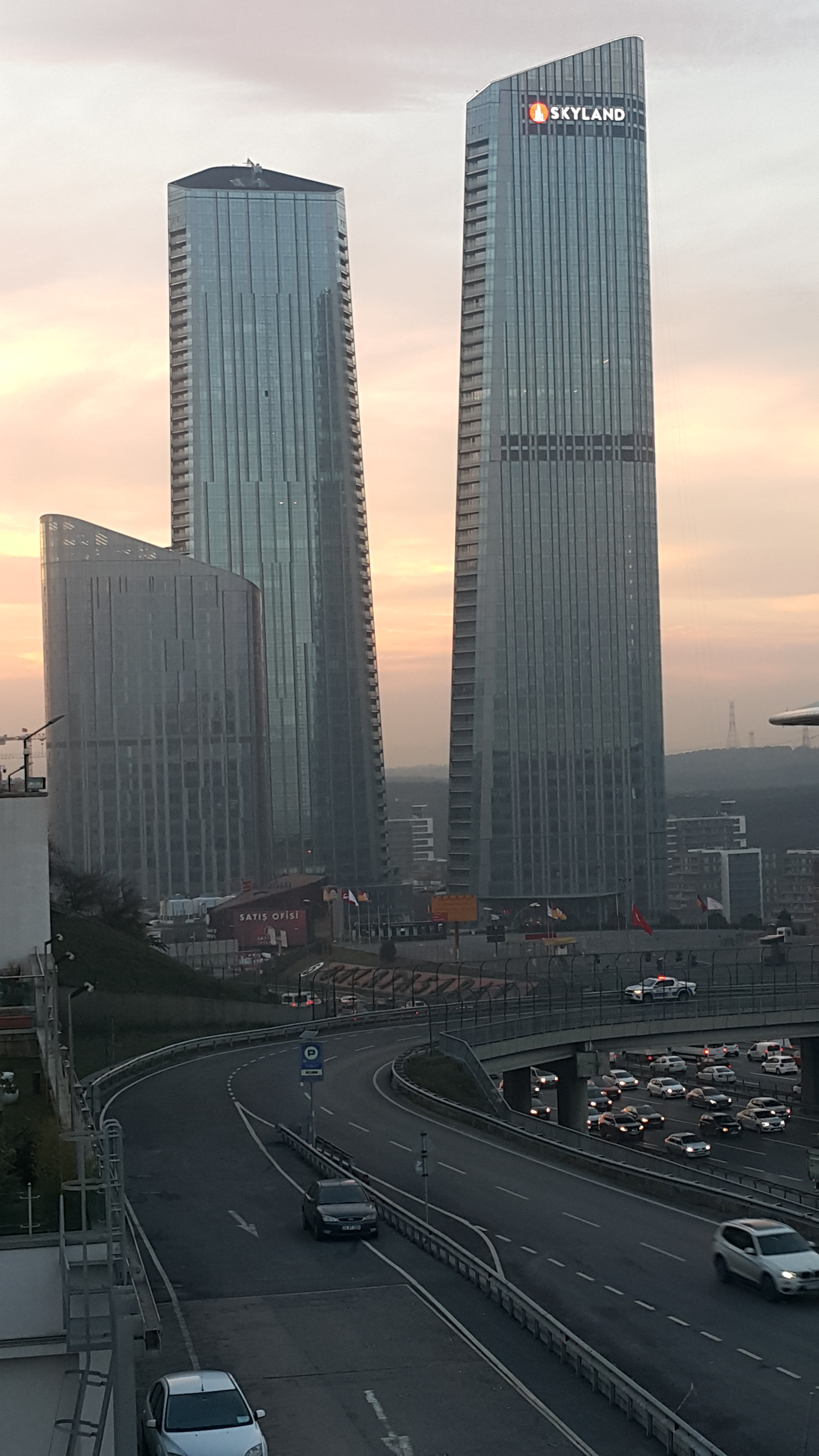
Skyland İstanbul

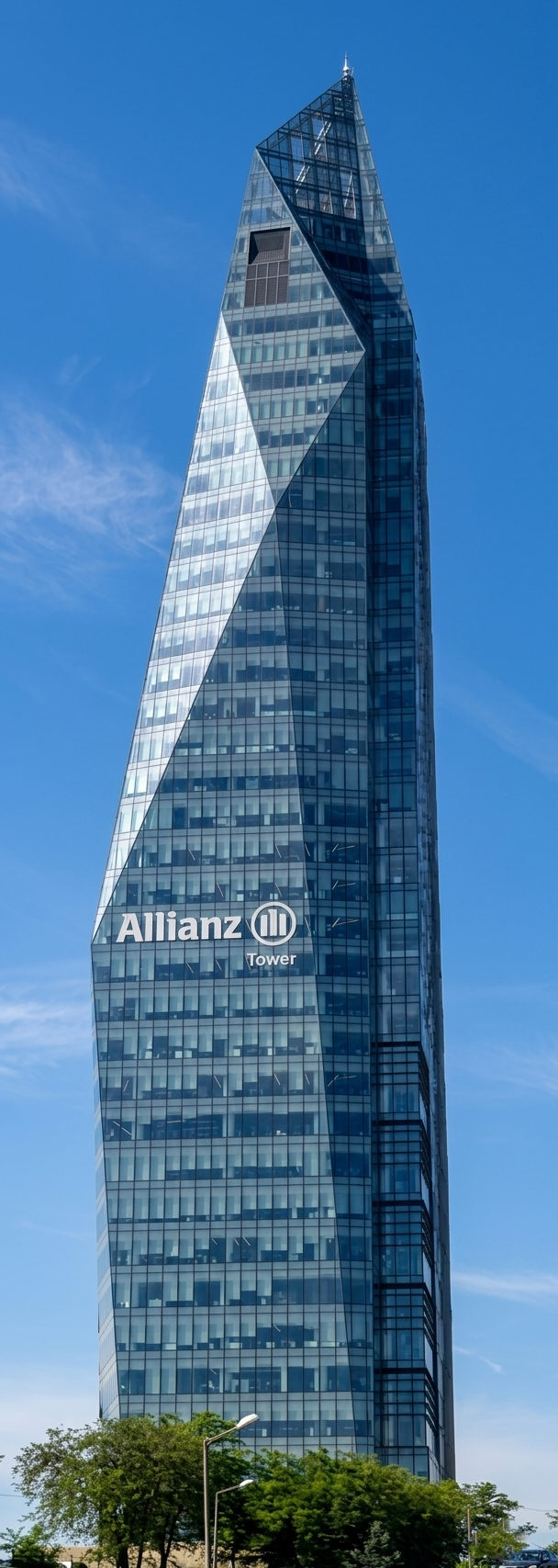
Allianz Tower in Ataşehir, Istanbul

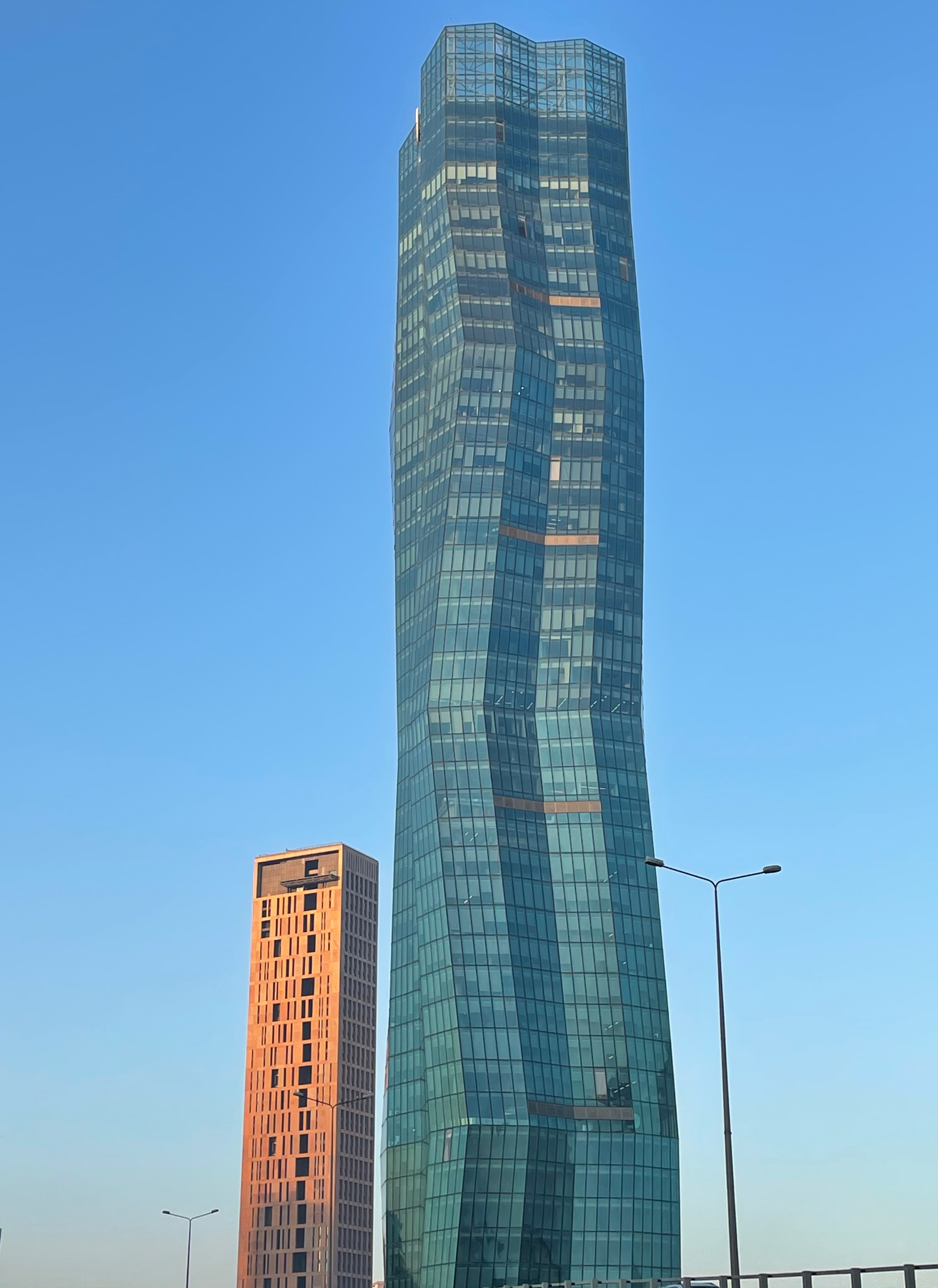
Mistral Office Tower in İzmir

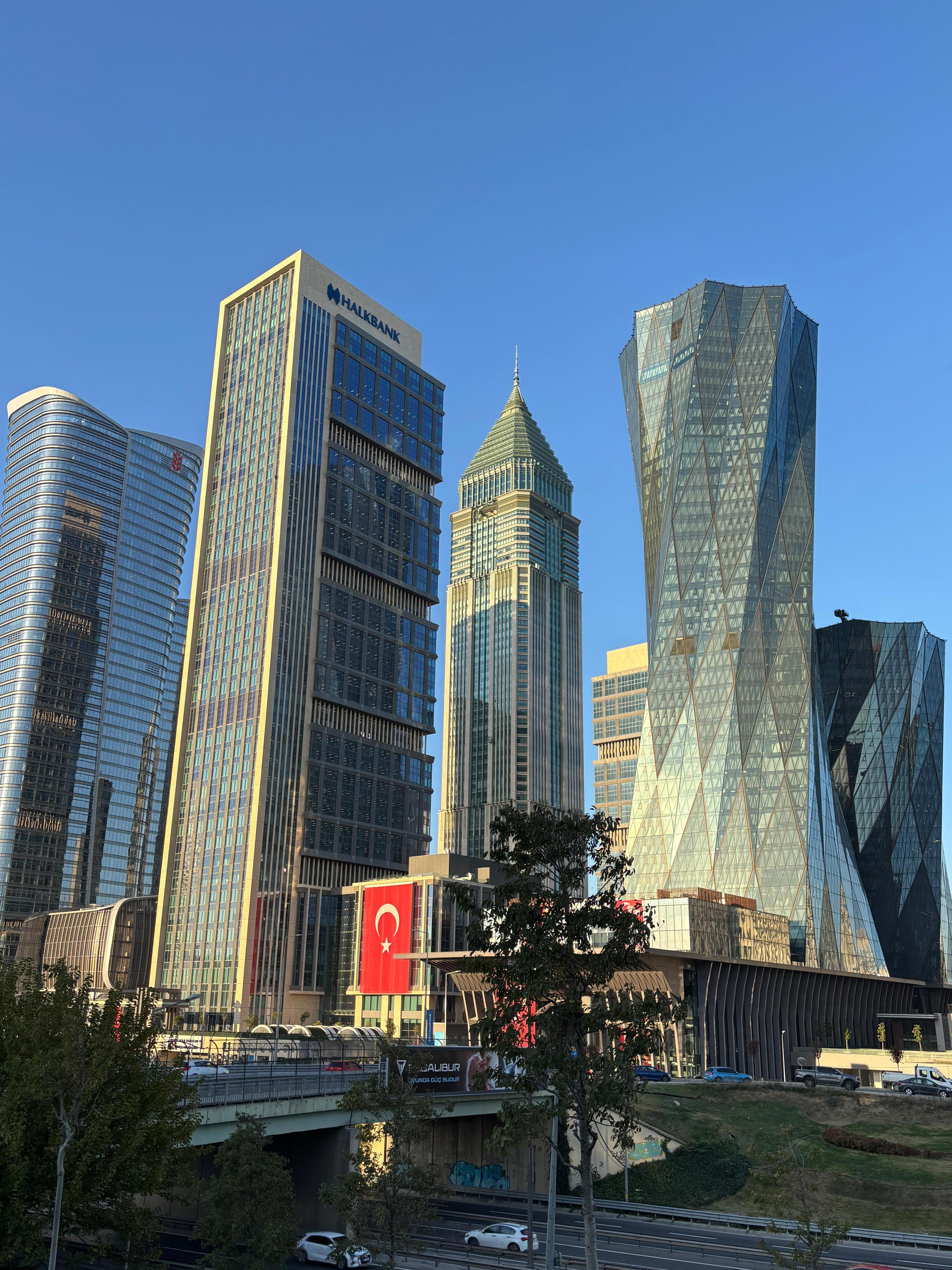
CBRT Tower (center) and the Istanbul Financial Center
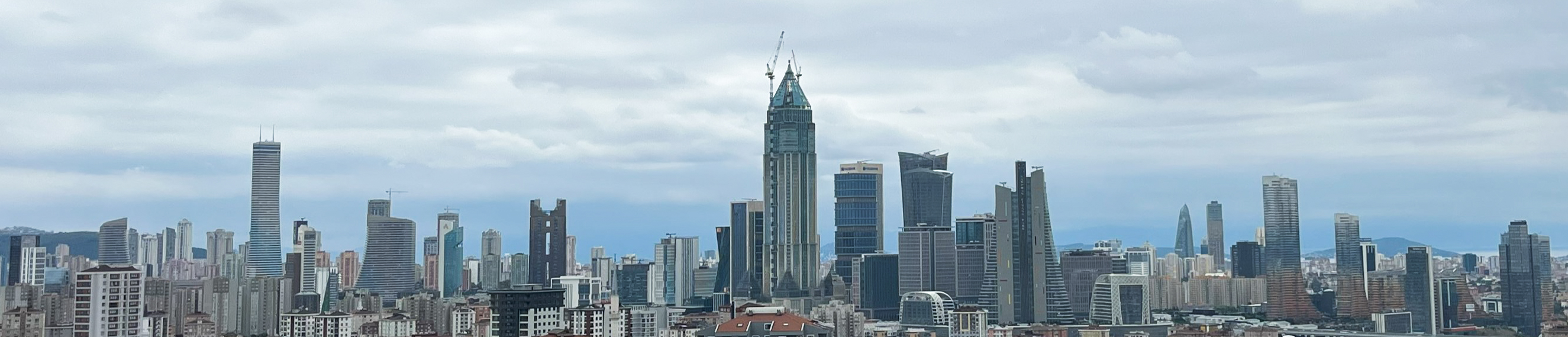
Istanbul Financial Center and the skyline of Ataşehir district on the Asian side of the city. CBRT Tower, the tallest skyscraper in Istanbul and Turkey, is at the center of the frame.

=== Earthquakes ===
Planning decisions affect architects. In earthquake-prone areas, all buildings built to 20th century standards may be dangerous, but shortly after the 1999 İzmit earthquake, which killed over 17 thousand people, a new seismic code was brought into force to protect against earthquakes in Turkey. That earthquake exposed many architectural design errors. Also following that earthquake a so-called earthquake tax was raised during the government of Bülent Ecevit. Initially thought as a temporary tax, it became permanent. In 2007 the seismic code was strengthened. However, it is alleged that builders often ignored the rules due to corruption. After the 2011 Van earthquakes Prime Minister Recep Tayyip Erdoğan said: "Municipalities, constructors and supervisors should now see that their negligence amounts to murder." In 2018, a zoning law gave amnesties to some unlicensed buildings and some with unlicensed floors.

Further resilience over the 2007 code was mandated in the 2018 Turkish Seismic Code, which took effect on 1 January 2019. Improvements included design supervision and site specific hazard definitions, and for new buildings in vulnerable regions required rebar in high quality concrete. Beams and columns in those buildings must be in the right place to properly absorb shaking. The code is said by foreign experts to be very modern and similar to US codes. However, these 21st-century building codes were not very well enforced.

In a bid to shore up support going into the 2018 Turkish presidential election, the government offered amnesties for violations of the building code, allowing non-compliance to continue with the payment of a fee. This poor enforcement of seismic codes was a contributing factor to the devastation of the 2023 Turkey–Syria earthquakes in which over 42,000 people died in Turkey. There were high incidences of support column failure leading to pancake collapses, which complicated rescue efforts. Experts lamented the practice would turn cities into graveyards. The 2023 Turkey–Syria earthquakes collapsed many older buildings and some recent ones. In the couple of months after those earthquakes a flurry of articles was published. A checklist for sustainable urban design has been created.

Unreinforced masonry buildings are vulnerable. Many older buildings in Istanbul are vulnerable to pancake collapses. Retrofitting old buildings is possible but expensive. Although over 3 million housing units nationwide were strengthened in the 2 decades before 2023, as of that year many apartment blocks do not meet 21st century standards. Building with wood has been suggested. Post disaster architecture in a village has been studied.

=== Climate change ===
There are almost 10 million buildings in Turkey, and as they are the largest energy consumers there are substantial opportunities for energy savings in both new build and renovations. There is a roadmap, which says that as of 2021 three quarters of building stock is pre-21st century, that is pre energy standards. A typical residential building emits almost 50 kgCO2eq/m2/year, mostly due to the energy used by residents. The Organisation for Economic Co-operation and Development (OECD) has said that more could be done to improve the energy efficiency of buildings, and that tax incentives offered for this would create jobs. Turkey was a co-leader of the group discussing zero-carbon buildings at the 2019 UN Climate Action Summit, and the city of Eskişehir has pledged to convert all existing buildings to zero emissions by 2050. Such energy efficiency improvements can be made in the same programme as increasing resilience to earthquakes in Turkey. However, as of 2026 gas is subsidized. Increasing the proportion of passive houses has been suggested, as has adopting some EU building standards. Thinktank Ember said in 2023 that rooftop solar should be mandatory on new buildings, and say that installation on apartment block roofs is hindered by bureaucracy. To improve the energy efficiency of buildings it has been suggested that green building principles and technologies should be applied.

Istanbul Policy Center estimate that most of the additional cost of net zero is for buildings. Although low-energy houses, zero-energy buildings and zero carbon housing will be encouraged, the 2024 long-term plan said that "The existing natural gas transmission and distribution infrastructure will be strengthened, and natural gas access will be provided in areas where renewable sources and waste heat-based district heating/cooling systems are not technically or economically feasible." In rural areas without a piped gas supply, heat pumps could be an alternative to wood, coal and bottled gas: but buying a heat pump is rare as it is very expensive for householders as there is no subsidy. As well as more insulation help for poor rural people, subsidies for communal heat pumps and solar panels have been suggested for any villages where they would be technically suitable. Owners of larger properties such as shopping centres, schools and government buildings have shown more interest in heat pumps. Direct geothermal heating (not to be confused with heat pumps) installed capacity totaled 3.5 GW thermal (GWt) in 2020, with the potential for 60 GWt.

There is no data on the carbon intensity of cement. Emissions from cement production could be lessened by reducing its clinker content—for example, by making Limestone Calcined Clay Cement, which is only half clinker. The second-largest reduction could be made by switching half the fuel from hard coal and petroleum coke (petcoke) to a mixture of rubber from waste tires, refuse-derived fuel and biomass. Although the country has enough of these materials, most cement kilns (there are 54) use coal, petcoke or lignite as their primary energy source. More cross-laminated timber could be used for building, instead of concrete. Further decarbonisation of cement production would depend heavily on carbon capture, perhaps storing in a salt dome near Lake Tuz or in Diyarbakır Province.

== See also ==
- Architecture of Istanbul
- List of Turkish architects
- List of tallest buildings in Turkey
