= First national architectural movement =

Architectural period in Turkey

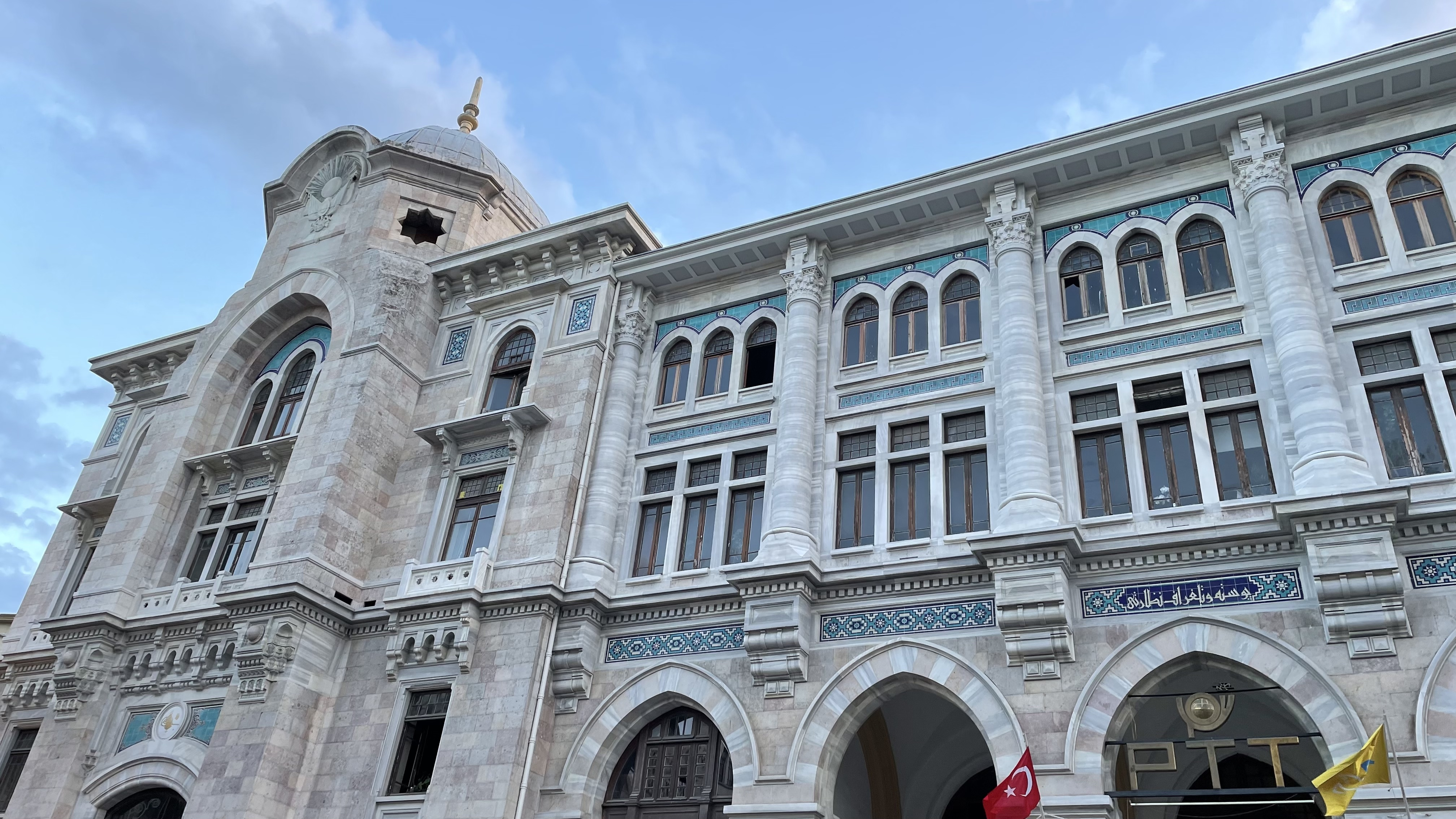
The Grand Post Office in Sirkeci, Istanbul, is considered to be the first building built in the Turkish Neoclassical style

The First national architecture movement (Turkish: Birinci Ulusal Mimarlık Akımı), also referred to in Turkey as the National architecture Renaissance (Turkish: Millî Mimari Rönesansı), or Turkish Neoclassical architecture (Turkish: Neoklasik Türk Üslûbu), was a period of Turkish architecture that was most prevalent between 1908 and 1930 but continued until the end of the 1930s. Inspired by Ottomanism, the movement sought to capture classical elements of Ottoman and Anatolian Seljuk architecture and use them in the construction of modern buildings. Despite the style focusing on Ottoman aspects, it was most prevalent during the first decade of the Republic of Turkey.

The most important architects of the movement were Ahmet Kemaleddin and Vedat Tek, who pioneered the movement, as well as Arif Hikmet Koyunoğlu and Ottoman-born architect of Italian descent Giulio Mongeri.

== History ==
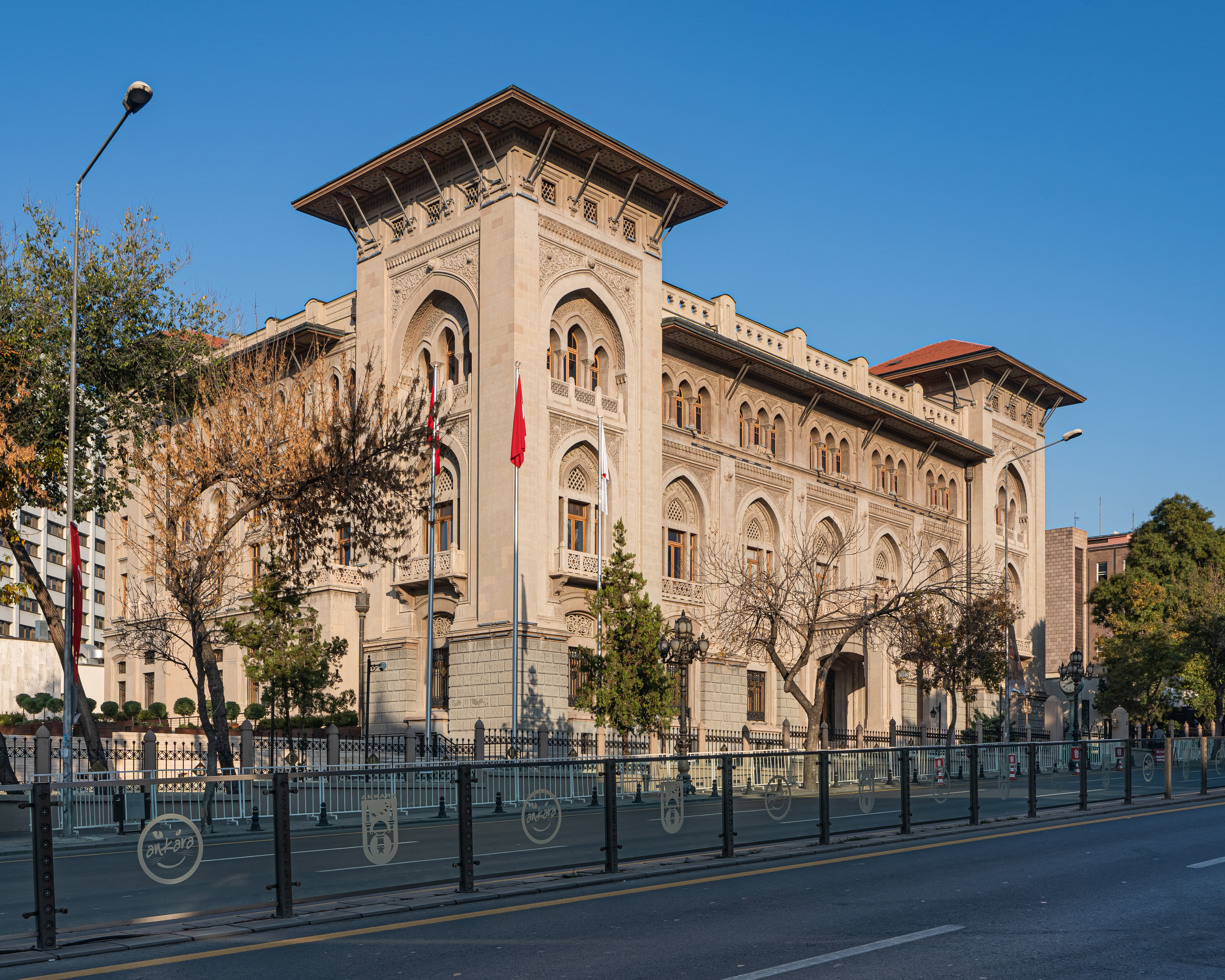
The Ziraat Bankası General Headquarters Building in Ankara is a prominent example of the movement

The movement began in the early 20th-century in the capital of the Ottoman Empire, Constantinople, with the goal of bringing back Turkish elements in the construction and design of new buildings. Ever since the late 18th century, European architectural movements such as Baroque, Neoclassical and Rococo architecture were the styles chosen for the majority of imperial buildings built up until the early 20th century.

The first building considered to be built in the Turkish neoclassical style is the Grand Post Office (1905–09), by Vedat Bey in Sirkeci. The building brought back classical Ottoman elements from the 16th century such as two-color stone workmanship and Islamic geometric patterns. This kick-started the movement which was then given the name New Ottoman architecture. After the Young Turk Revolution in 1908, the new government promoted Ottoman Revival architecture as a contrast to the many buildings built in western European styles. New government buildings as well as public buildings constructed during the last decade of the empire were mainly designed in the New Ottoman style such as the 7th Eyüp Reşadiye High-school (1911), Beşiktaş Pier (1913), Aviation Martyrs' Monument (1916) as well as the new headquarters for the Committee of Union and Progress, which would later become the first Grand National Assembly building when completed, in 1920. Even after the end of World War I, during the allied occupation of Constantinople, construction of new buildings continued in this style. The Tayyare Apartments, by Ahmet Kemaleddin, were built between 1918 and 1922, during the occupation.

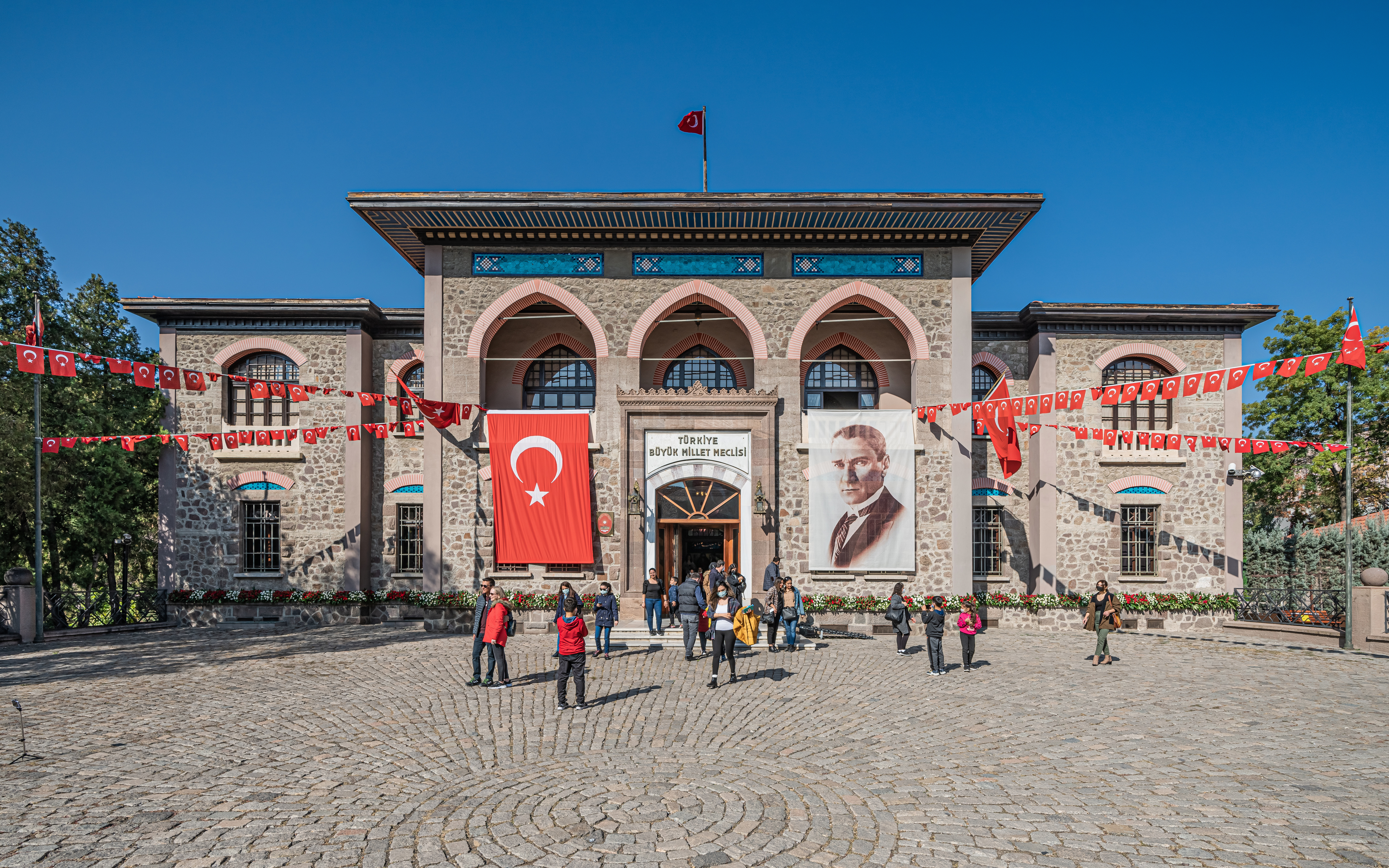
The Second Parliament building of Turkey (1924) was built in the Turkish Neoclassical style

After the Turkish War of Independence and subsequent formation of the Republic of Turkey, the new government, led by President Mustafa Kemal, further promoted the architectural style which would live out its golden years in the 1920s. Subsequent government buildings such as the second Grand National Assembly building (1924), the Ministry of Finance general headquarters (1925) and the Ministry of Culture general headquarters (1927) were all built with Turkish Neoclassical architecture.

Due to the high demand of buildings and lack of Turkish architects, Western influences once again took hold in the architecture of the 1930s. The Turkish government brought in several European architects, such as Clemens Holzmeister and Ernst Egli, to design many buildings during this period. This however did bring forth a mix of modern architecture with Turkish Neoclassical, most notably seen in the Sivas station building (1934).

The mix of architectural styles led forth to the Second national architectural movement (1939-1950).

== Examples ==
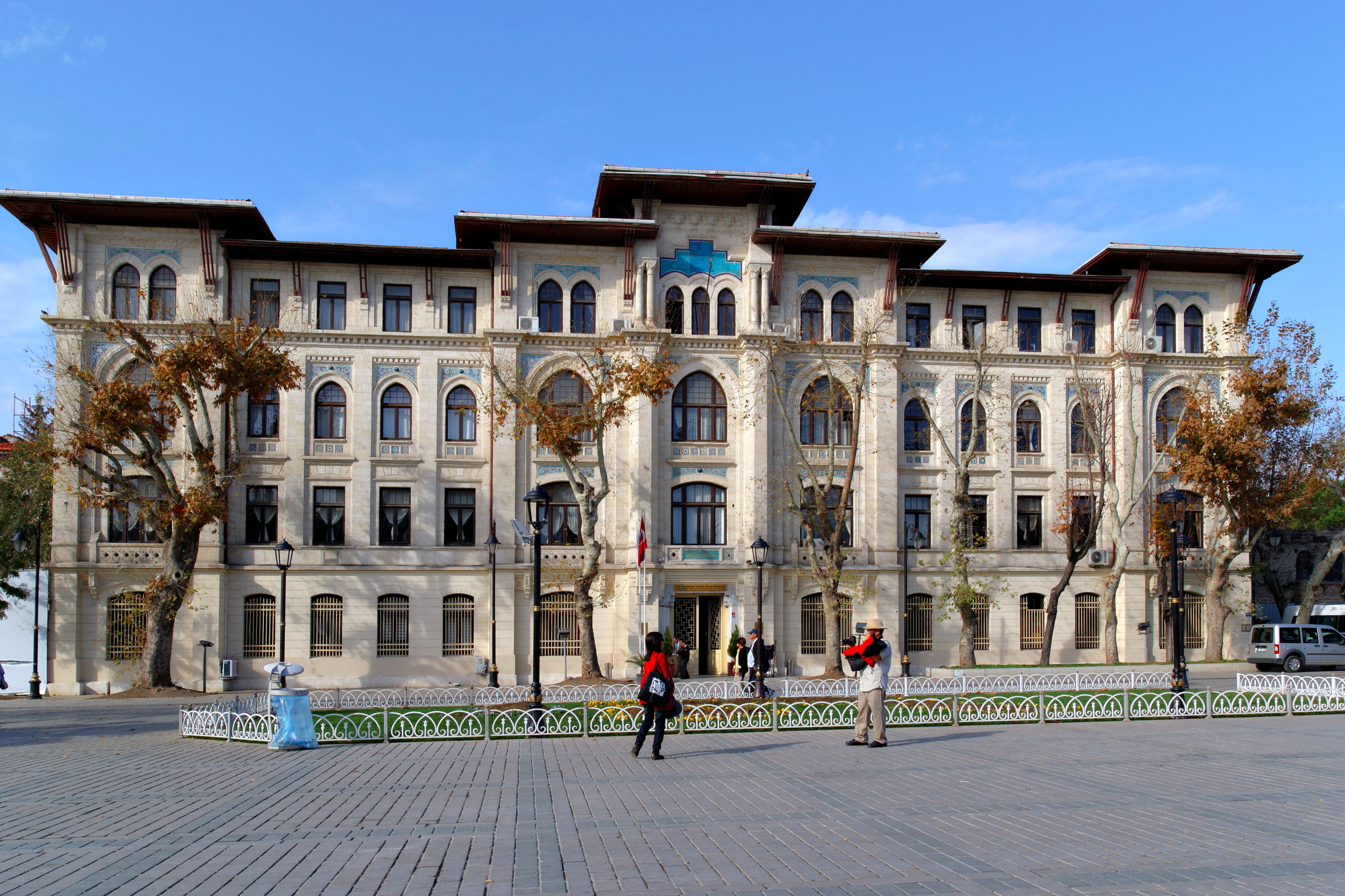
Defter-i Hakani building in Sultanahmet, Istanbul, built by Vedat Tek

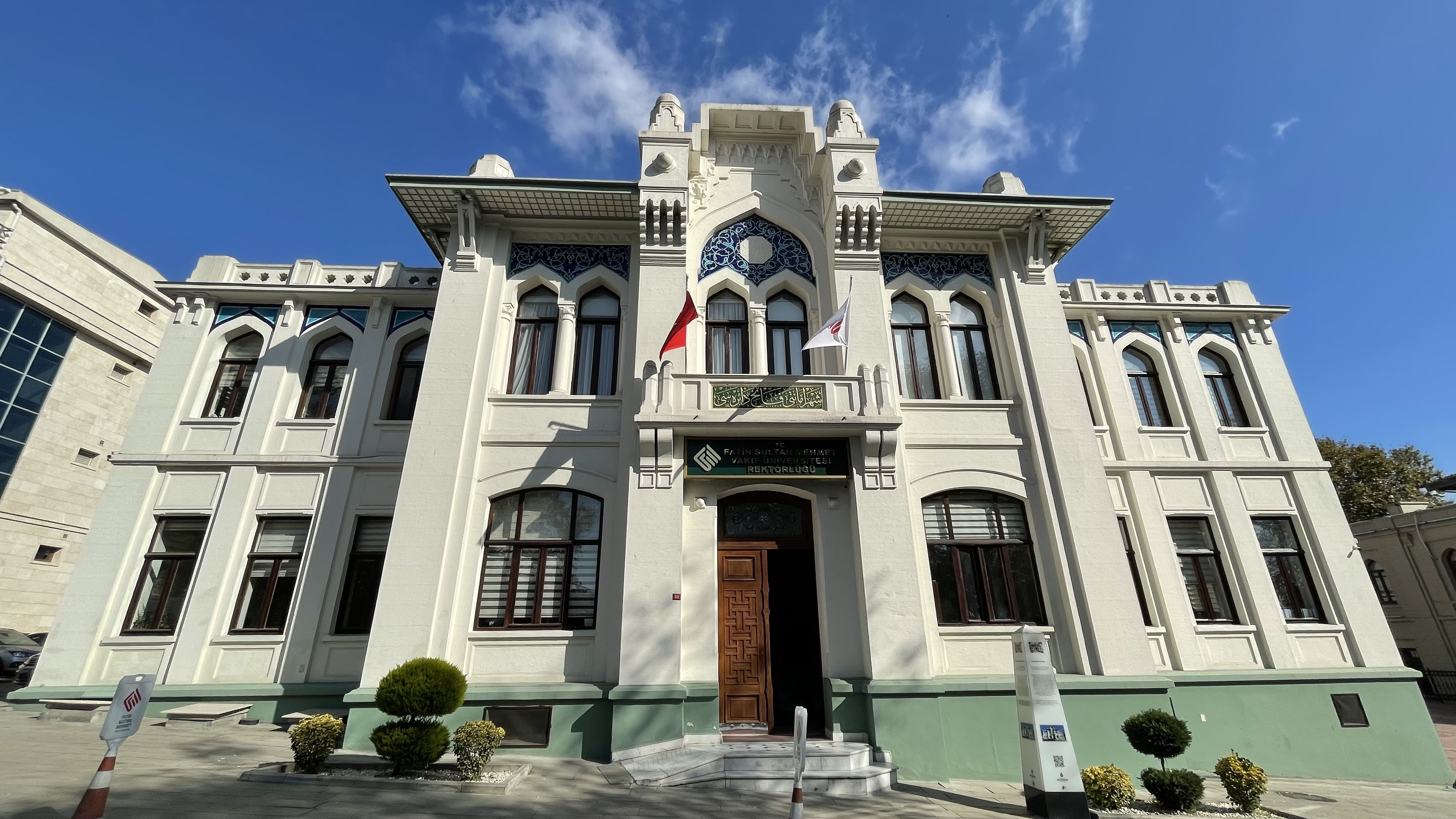
Old Fatih Municipality Building built by Yervant Terziyan

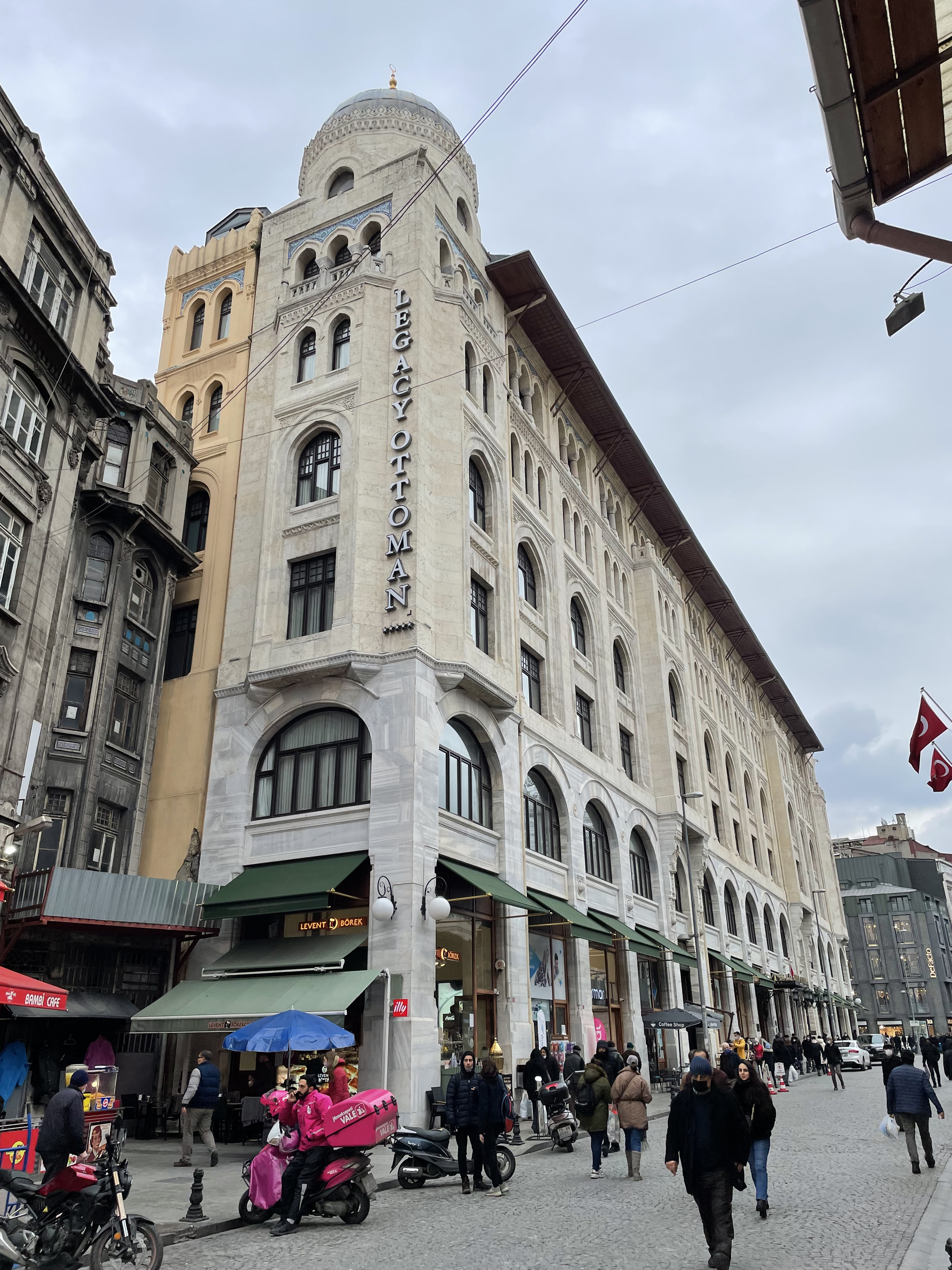
Istanbul 4th Vakıf Han in Eminönü, designed by Mimar Kemaleddin Bey (1911–1926).

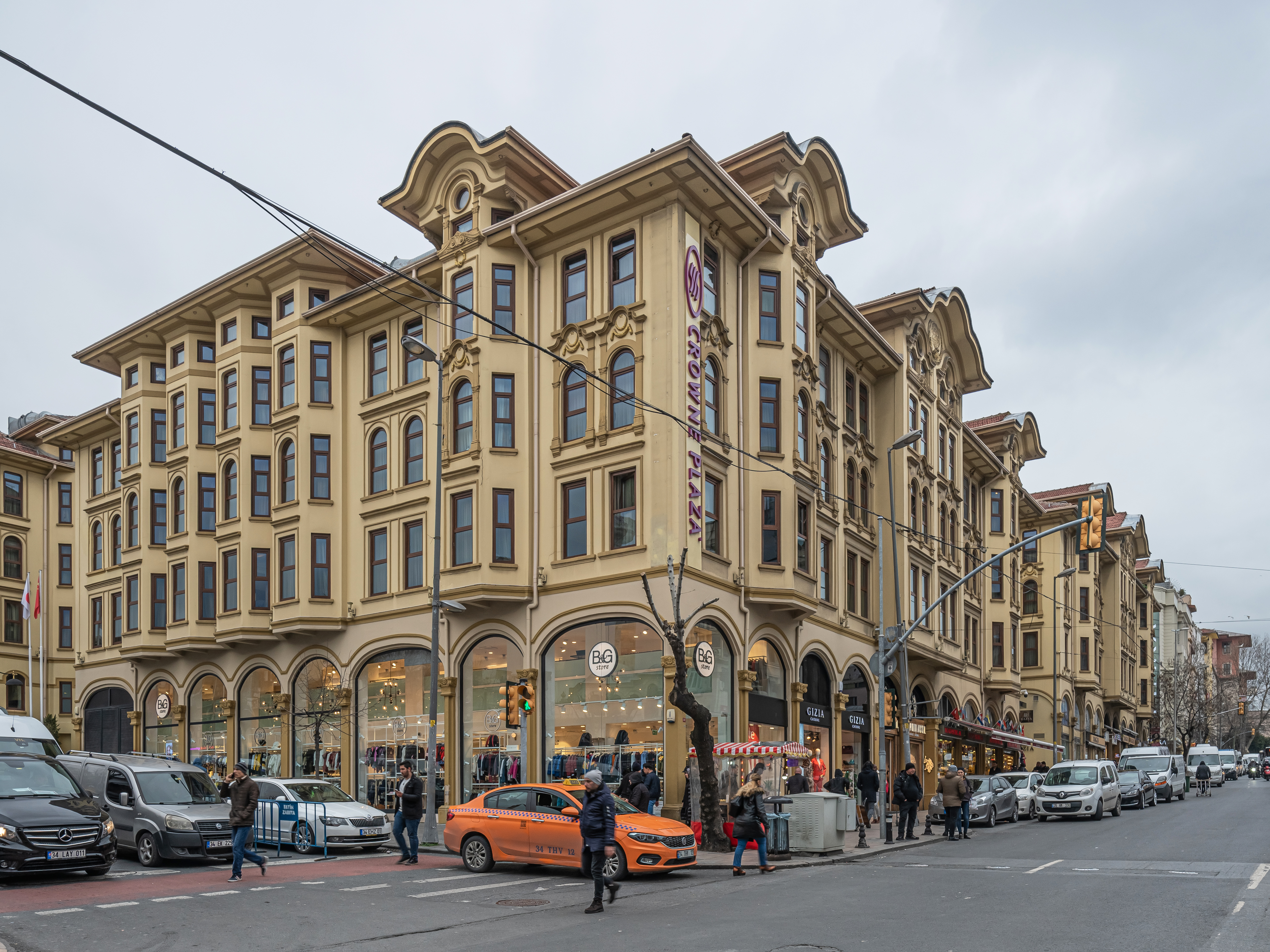
Tayyare Apartments in Laleli, Istanbul, designed by Mimar Kemaleddin Bey (1919–1922)

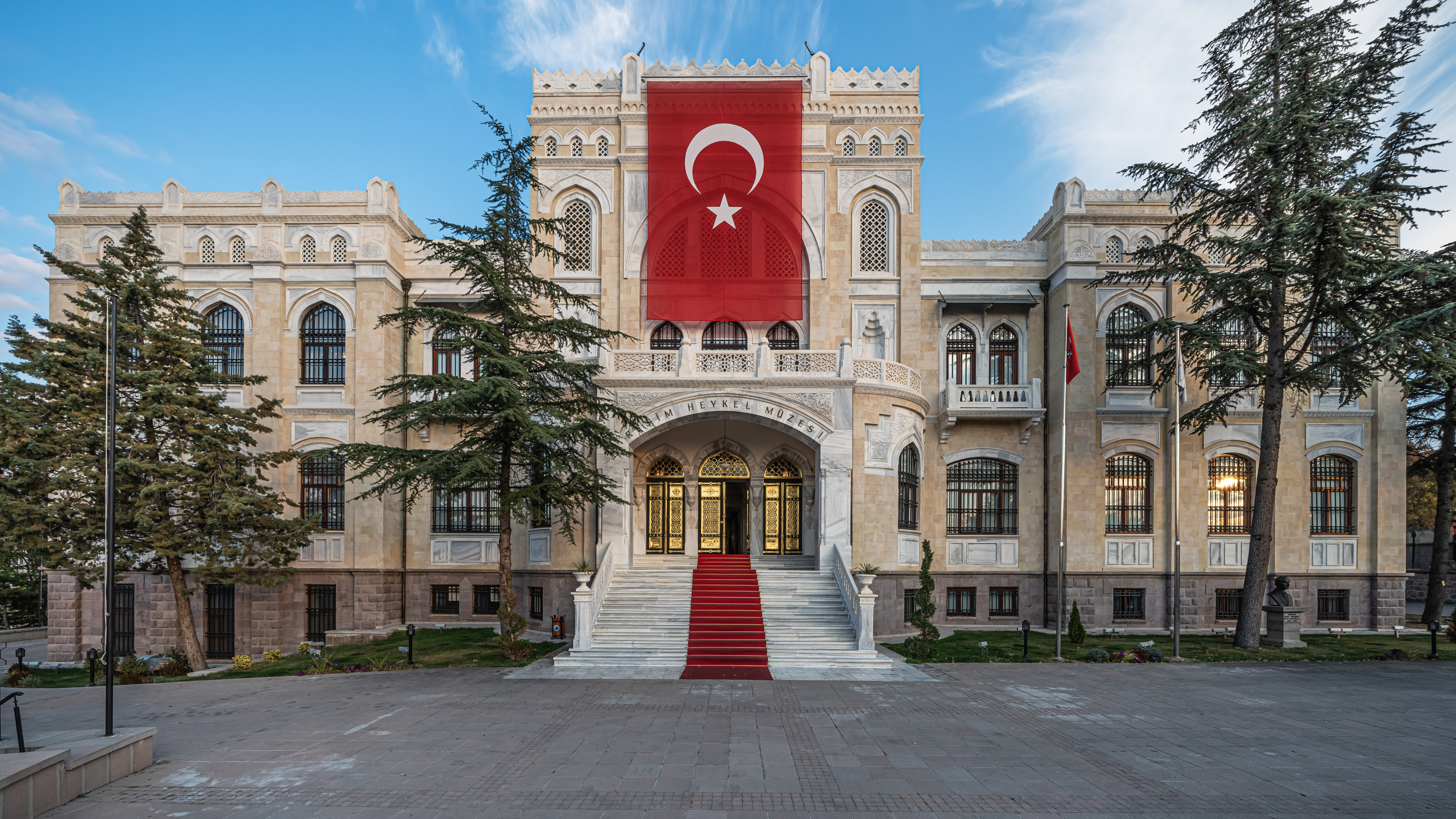
State Art and Sculpture Museum in Ankara, designed by Arif Hikmet Koyunoğlu (1927–1930).

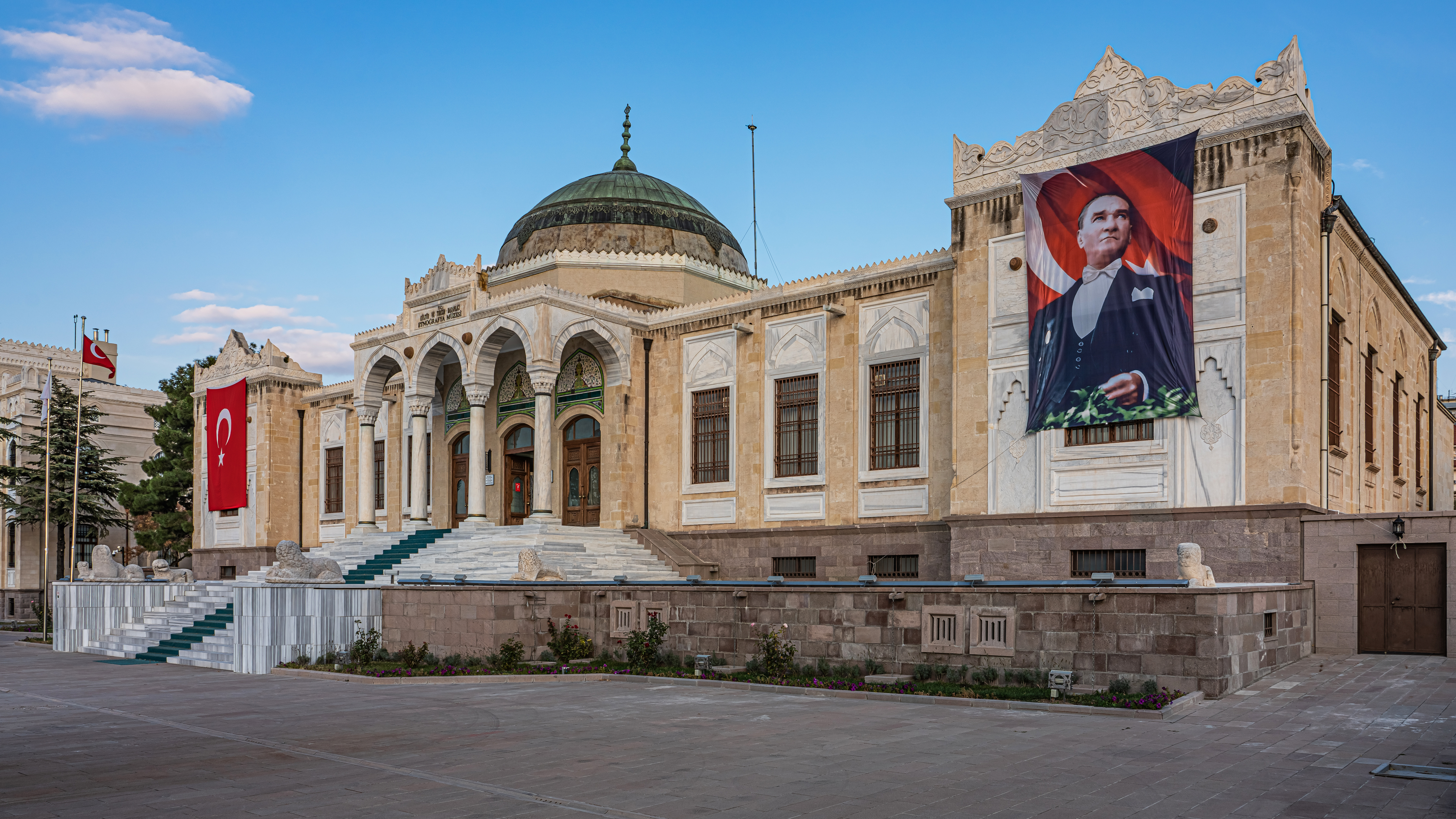
Ethnography Museum of Ankara was designed by architect Arif Hikmet Koyunoğlu (1925-1928).

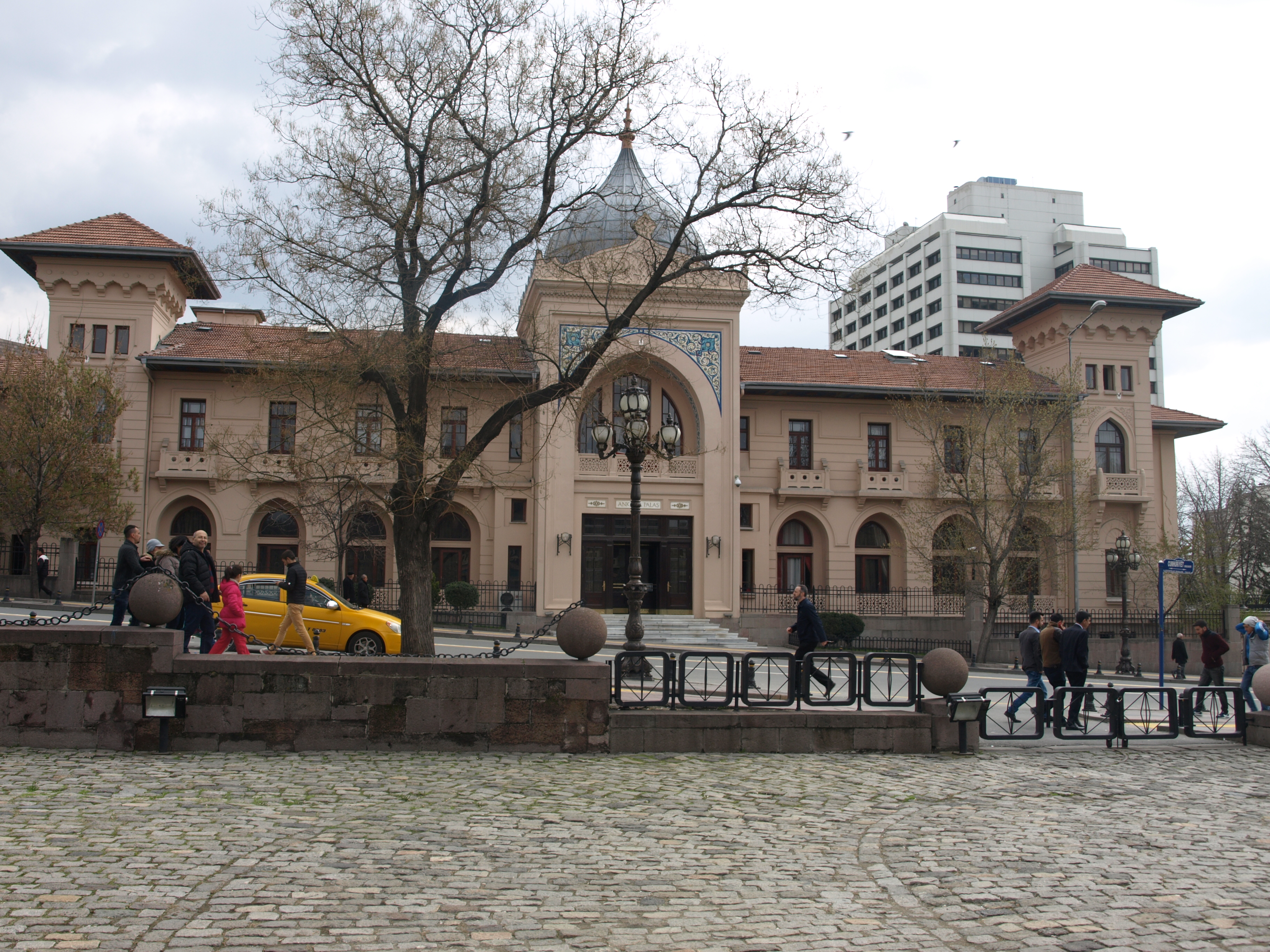
Ankara Palas

== Notable buildings ==
- Grand Post Office (1909) in Sirkeci, Istanbul.
- Land Registry General Directorate Building (1908)
- Adana station building (1912) in Kurtuluş, Adana
- Bulgur Palas (1912) in Fatih, Istanbul
- Beşiktaş Pier (1913) in Beşiktaş, Istanbul.
- Karaağaç station building (1914) in Karaağaç, Edirne
- Vedat Tek House in Nişantaşı, Istanbul.
- First Grand National Assembly Building (1920) in Ulus, Ankara
- Tayyare Apartments (1922) in Laleli, Istanbul.
- Second Grand National Assembly Building (1924) in Ulus, Ankara
- Gazi station building (1926) in Ankara
- Elhamra Theater (1926) in Konak, İzmir
- Ministry of Culture General Headquarters (1927) in Sıhhiye, Ankara
- Ankara Palas (1928) in Ulus, Ankara
- Ziraat Bankası General Headquarters Building (1929) in Ulus, Ankara.
- State Art and Sculpture Museum (1930) in Altındağ, Ankara.
- Ethnography Museum of Ankara (1928) in Ulus, Ankara.
- Second Evkaf Apartments (1930) in Ulus, Ankara.
- Kanara Building (1932) in Seyhan, Adana.

== See also ==
- Architecture of Turkey
