= Neo-Ottoman architecture =

Neo-Ottoman architecture may refer to:

- First national architectural movement, an Ottoman architectural revival in the early 20th-century
- Contemporary Neo-Ottoman mosques in the later 20th century and 21st century
