= Vedat Tek House =

Museum in Istanbul, Turkey

- Vedat Tek Evi
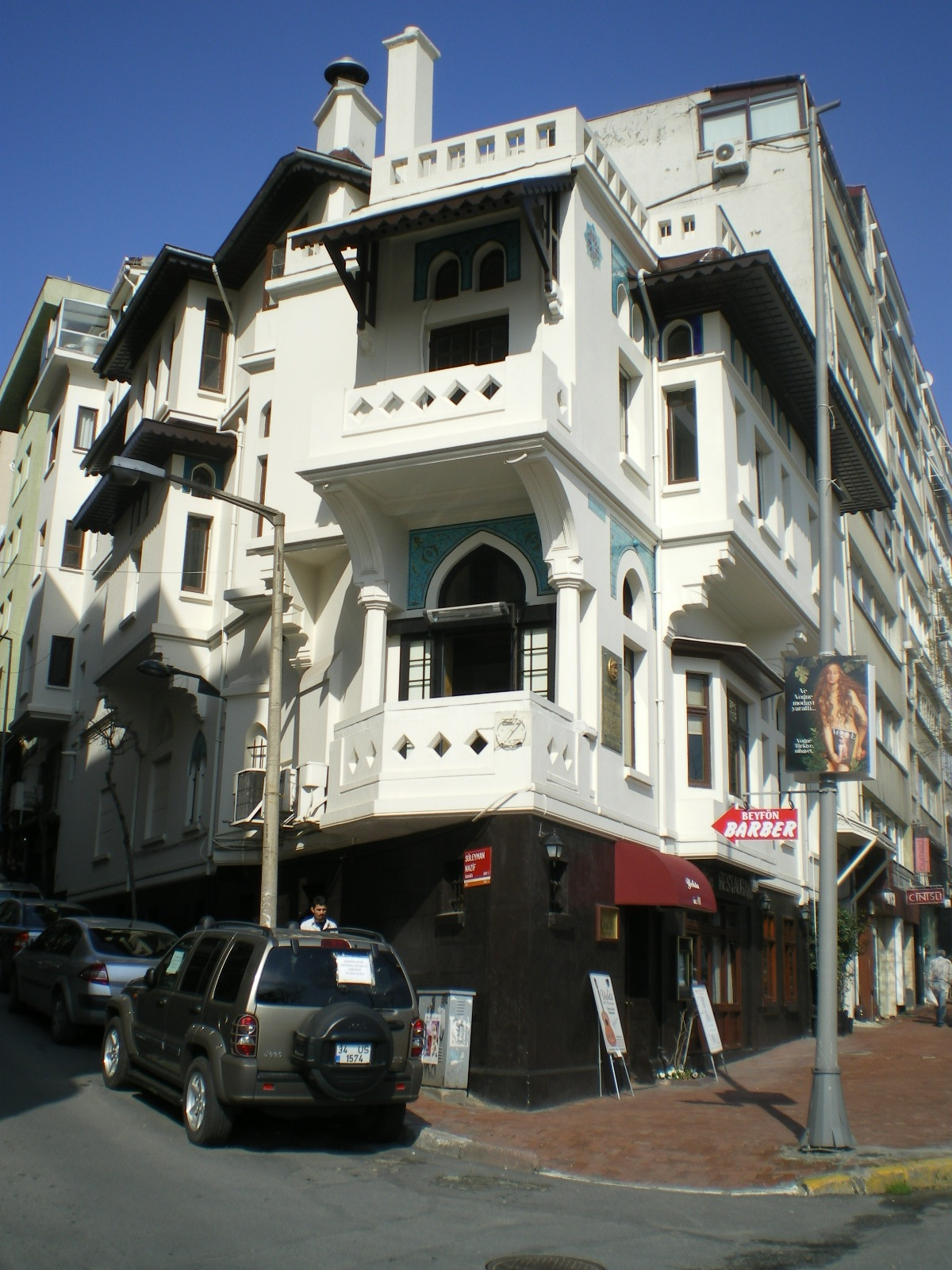
- The Vedat Tek House.

- Location within Istanbul

General information
- Status: Museum
- Architectural style: Turkish Neoclassical
- Location: Şişli, Vali Konağı Cd. 41, Halaskargazi Mah. 34371, Istanbul, Turkey
- Coordinates: 41.050350°N 28.989323°E
- Construction started: 1913
- Completed: 1914

Technical details
- Floor count: 3

Design and construction
- Architect: Vedat Tek

The Vedat Tek House (Turkish: Vedat Tek Evi) is a museum and former residence of renowned Turkish architect Vedat Tek in Istanbul, Turkey. The house was built between 1913 and 1914 by Vedat Tek for his family and himself and is a notable example of Turkish neoclassical architecture.

== Location ==
The house is located in the Nişantaşı neighborhood of Şişli on the European side of Istanbul, about 200 m (660 ft) east of Cumhuriyet Avenue. Located across from the house is the Istanbul Military Museum and the Cemal Reşit Rey Concert Hall. The closest metro station to the house is Osmanbey on the M2 line, about 500 m (1,600 ft) north on Halaskargazi Avenue. Formerly across from the house was the Art deco Yayla Apartments, also designed by Tek in 1939. However, the building was demolished in 1989.

== Architecture and design ==
Built in the Turkish Neoclassical style, the house is one of several of Tek's well known examples in this architectural movement. Turquoise tiles, arches following Islamic geometry and extrusions typical of classical Ottoman houses are the main design elements of the building.

The house itself consists of three floors, but due to the slanted plot on which it was built, a fourth floor on ground level exists. This level is used as a restaurant.
