= Republic Museum =

- Cumhuriyet Müzesi
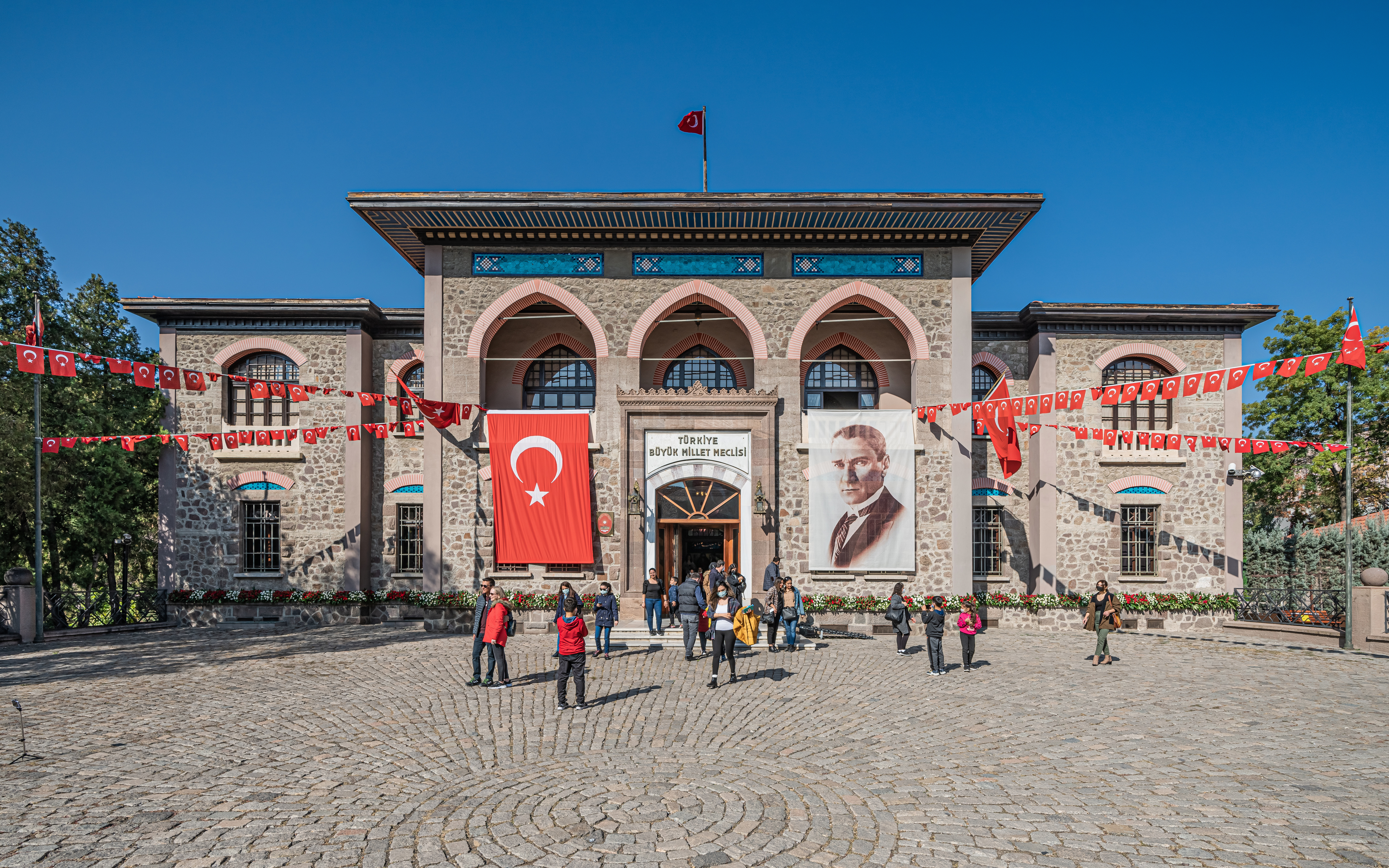
- Museum from the southeast

- Republic Museum
- Established: 1981; 45 years ago
- Location: Cumhuriyet Caddesi Ankara Turkey
- Coordinates: 39°56′28″N 32°51′06″E
- Collections: Turkey
- Owner: Ministry of Culture and Tourism
- Website: Republic Museum
- Building details

General information
- Architectural style: Turkish Neoclassical
- Inaugurated: 18 September 1924

Technical details
- Floor count: 2

Design and construction
- Architect: Vedat Tek
- Known for: 2nd Parliament Building

Republic Museum (also known as "Second parliament Building of Turkey", Turkish: Cumhuriyet Müzesi) is a museum in Ankara, Turkey, which was the Turkish Parliament building from 1924 to 1960.

== Geography ==
The museum is in the Ulus neighborhood of Ankara, on Cumhuriyet Boulevard. The War of Independence Museum, another museum which served as the Turkish Parliament (from 1920 to 1924) is to the northeast of the Republic Museum.

== History ==
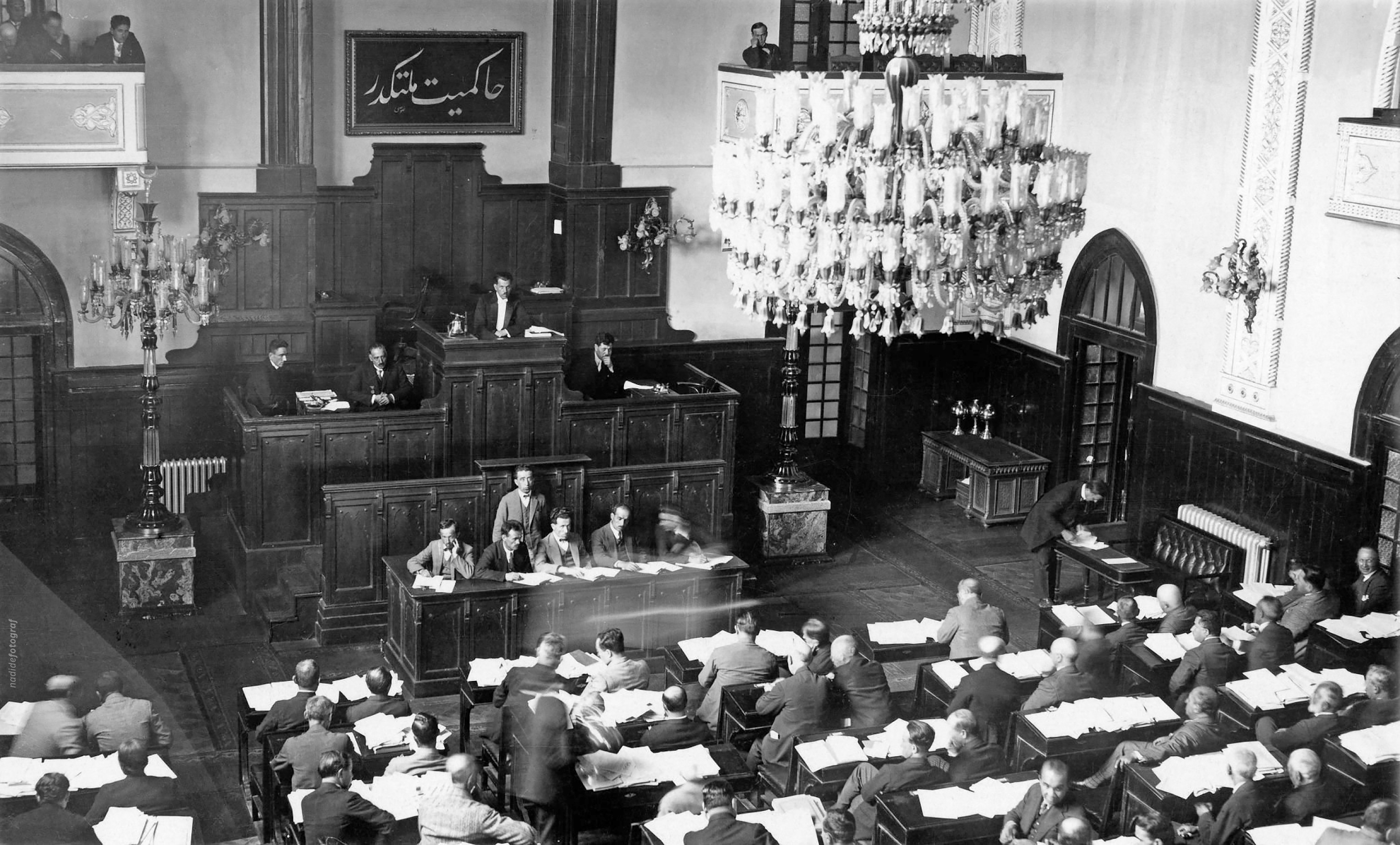
The session of the Grand National Assembly in 1928

The former Turkish Parliament building (now the War of Independence Museum) which was used during the Turkish War of Independence, was actually a branch office building of the Ottoman era-Committee of Union and Progress. During the war of Independence the committee was already dissolved and the nationalists used the building as the parliament building, but it was small and inconvenient. Thus, after the Republic was proclaimed in 1923, a new and larger building was constructed just to the southwest of the former building. The architect of the new building was Vedat (Tek). The parliament moved to this new building on 18 September 1924.

Up to 1960, all Turkish Parliaments from the 2nd to the 11th Parliament of Turkey served in this building.

After 1960, the building served as the CENTO (Central Treaty Organization) headquarters. After CENTO was dissolved in 1979, the building was handed over to the Ministry of Culture, and the ministry redesigned the building as a museum. The museum was opened on 30 September 1981 in the 100th birth year of Mustafa Kemal Atatürk.

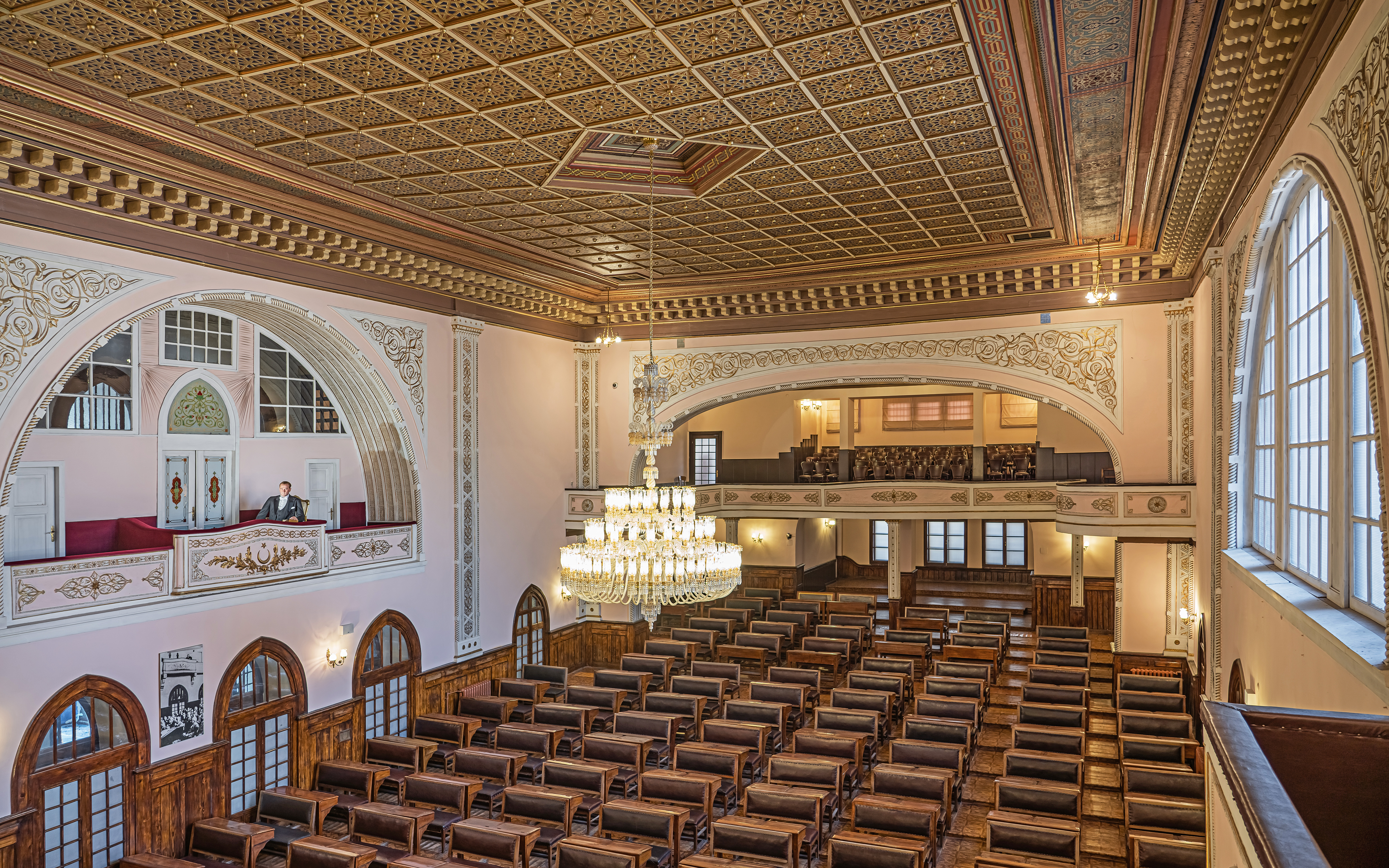
Historical Plenary chamber inside the museum

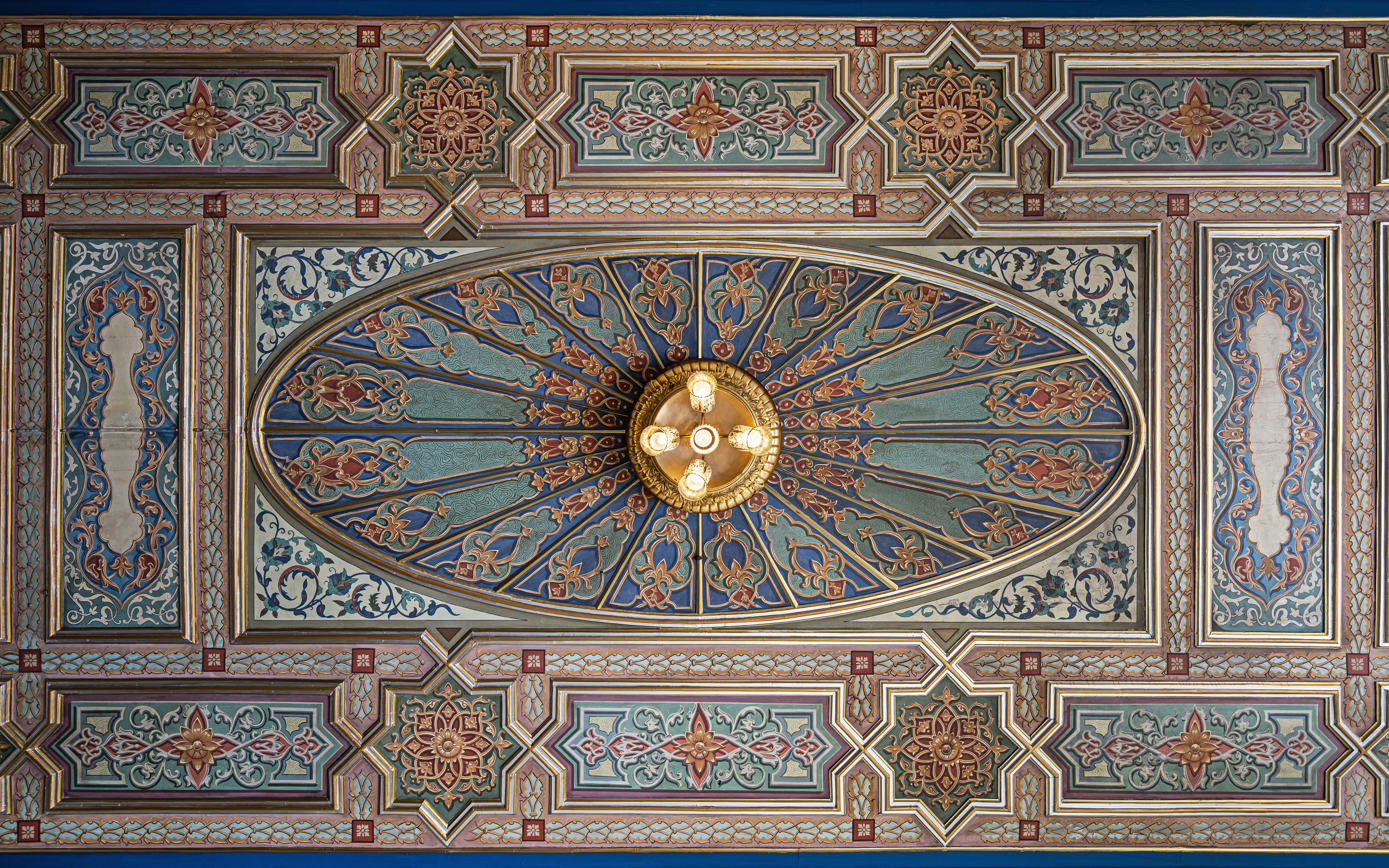
Ceiling of the entrance hall

== The museum ==
In the museum the photographs of all former presidents of Turkey and Prime Ministers of Turkey, as well as all banknotes and coins issued during the Republican age, are displayed. There are also photographs, showboards and mockups about the development of the country after the Republic was proclaimed.
