= Elhamra Theater =

Theater in İzmir, Turkey

- Elhamra Sahnesi
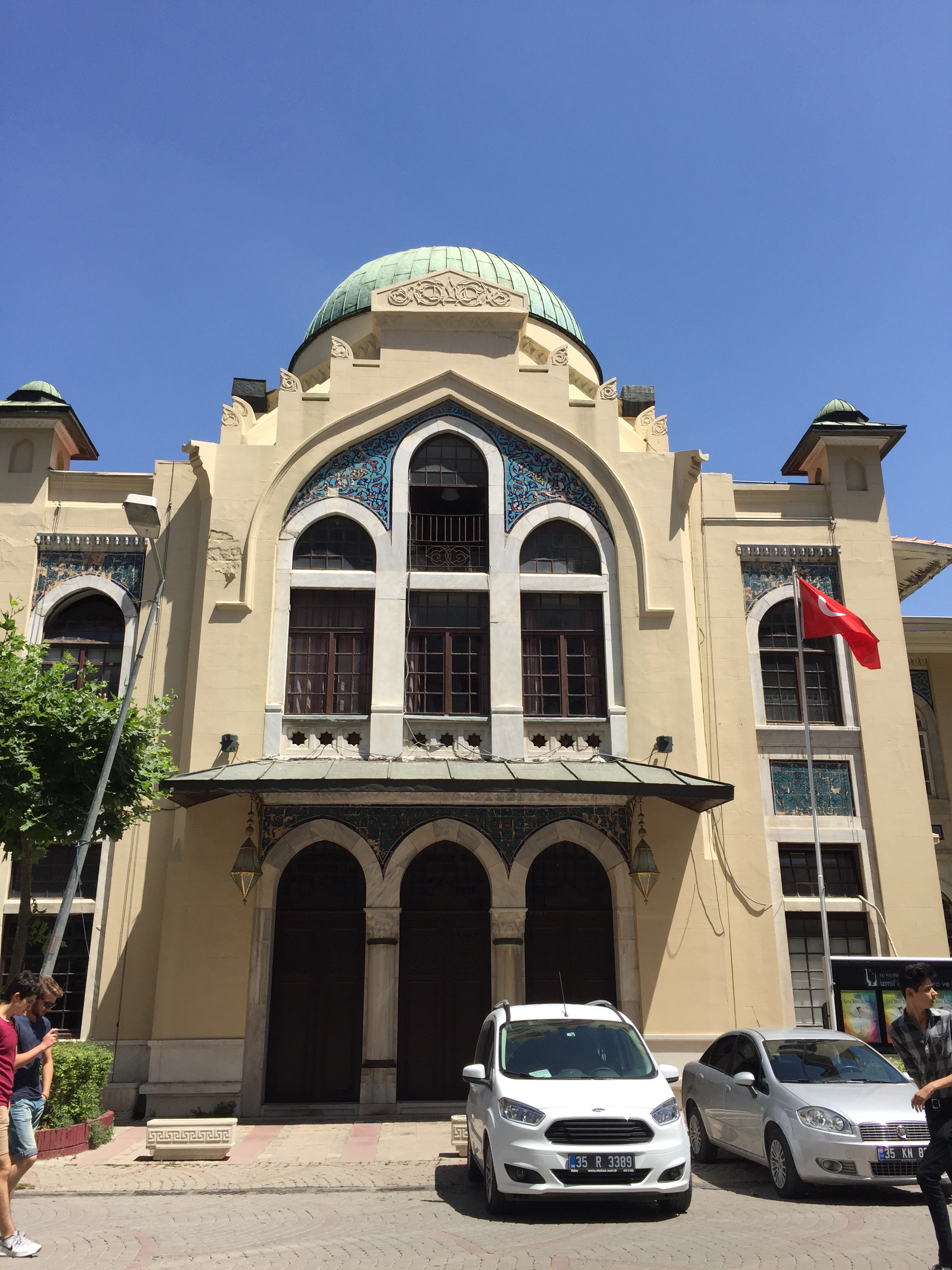
- Front facade of the theater
- Interactive map of the Elhamra Theater area
- Former names: Elhamra Cinema

General information
- Status: Open
- Architectural style: Turkish Neoclassical
- Location: Milli Kütüphane Cd., Konak Mah. 35250; Konak, İzmir, Turkey
- Completed: 1912

Design and construction
- Architect: Tahsin Sermet

Elhamra Theater is a theater in İzmir, Turkey. It was built in 1926 and designed by the architect Tahsin Sermet Bey. It was built for public use as a theater, currently it is being using as the İzmir State Opera and Ballet.

== Formal qualities ==
It is a symmetrical composition. The part with the dome is higher than the other parts in terms of its importance, because that's where the performances take place. The style of the building is neoclassical. As we can perceive from the columns, the dome, and the symmetrical composition. Also it has Turkish motif like ceramic glaze. These combine the western and eastern architecture.

== Structure and material qualities ==
There is an arch-like wall between the ground floor and the dome which relieves the weight of the dome, also holds the dome together in an architectural and aesthetic way. Most of the building is concrete and painted to greenish yellow. The dome is green. The windows and the doors are made out of wood. The frames of the windows and doors, and the columns are made out of marble. Also the ceramic glazes are blue and because of that they have a harmony with the walls.
