= Kanara Building =

Kanara
- Interactive map of the Kanara area
- Alternative names: Adana Mezbahası

General information
- Status: Completed
- Location: Seyhan, Adana, Turkey
- Construction started: 1930
- Opened: 1932
- Owner: Adana Metropolitan Municipality

Design and construction
- Architect: Semih Rüstem Temel

Kanara Building, also known as Adana Slaughterhouse, is a historic municipal slaughterhouse in the Seyhan district of Adana, Turkey, which opened in 1932.

Built in the early years of the Republic of Turkey, the structure reflects the characteristics of the First National Architectural Movement with its monumental entrance. It was designed by architect Semih Rüstem Temel. It is believed that its name was given by Mustafa Kemal Atatürk in 1933. The building's name later became the name of the Kanara neighbourhood in Turkey.

To put an end to unsanitary slaughtering practices in the city, it was built in southeastern Adana, Turkey, on the banks of the Seyhan River, approximately 3-4 kilometers from the city centre. It was designed to handle the slaughter of 300 small and 30 large livestock per day. The facility consists of single-story pavilions and a water tower. It also housed an ice factory capable of producing 10 tons of ice daily to meet the high demand for ice during the summer months in the city. The facility's garden served as a picnic area for the people of Adana and provided a social gathering space.

== History ==
In Adana, Turkey, where summers are long and hot, and meat consumption is high, the absence of a slaughterhouse providing food under hygienic conditions, along with the high demand for ice and the high prices charged by private ice factories, led to the demand for a modern slaughterhouse and ice factory in the early years of the Republic of Turkey. As a result, Adana Municipality decided to construct a facility that included a hygienic slaughterhouse, an ice factory, and cold storage units. After slaughterhouses were built in Istanbul, Izmir, and Ankara, one was also established in Adana. The location of the facility was planned by considering the flow direction of the Seyhan River, the prevailing wind direction, and its connection to the local leather industry. In 1929, architect Semih Rüstem designed the Adana Municipal Slaughterhouse with a pavilion-based layout rather than a central plan, taking seasonal conditions into account. Construction began in 1930, and the facility was opened for use in June 1932.

== Architecture ==
The facility was planned as a complex consisting of 6 pavilions and 18-meter-high water tower, constructed using brick masonry. The main building houses the slaughterhouse, sales hall, cold storage units, and ice factory. To the east of the main unit are the warehouse, stables, worker lockers and showers, dining hall, and water reservoir; to the south are the restaurant and laboratory. With additional units added in the 1960s, the number of pavilions increased to nine.

The administration building is two stories, while the other buildings are single-story. The facade is made of artificial stone, and the basement and decorative elements are made of cut stone. The floor is made of marble mosaic. The carved stones used in the building were sourced from quarries in Tarsus, and materials like iron and tile paint were brought from Kütahya.

The ceilings are mostly made of reinforced concrete. All buildings are covered with Marseille tiles on barrel roofs. The shape of the roof, with its rectangular base and pyramid-like top, and its consoles, shows influences from Hungarian architecture. The water tower resembles the tower of Vajdahunyad Castle in Budapest, built in 1908, where architect Semih Rüstem Temel studied.

== Name of the building ==
It is believed that when Atatürk visited the building in 1933, he is said to have remarked, "Kan ara ki bulasın" ("Search for blood to find it"), and requested that the building be named Kanara. Some believe that the term "kanara" began to be used to refer to a slaughterhouse after the building was named. Others argue that the Arabic word "kinnâre" evolved into "kanara" in the Adana dialect.
