= Ethnography Museum of Ankara =

Museum in Ankara, Turkey

- Ankara Etnografya Müzesi
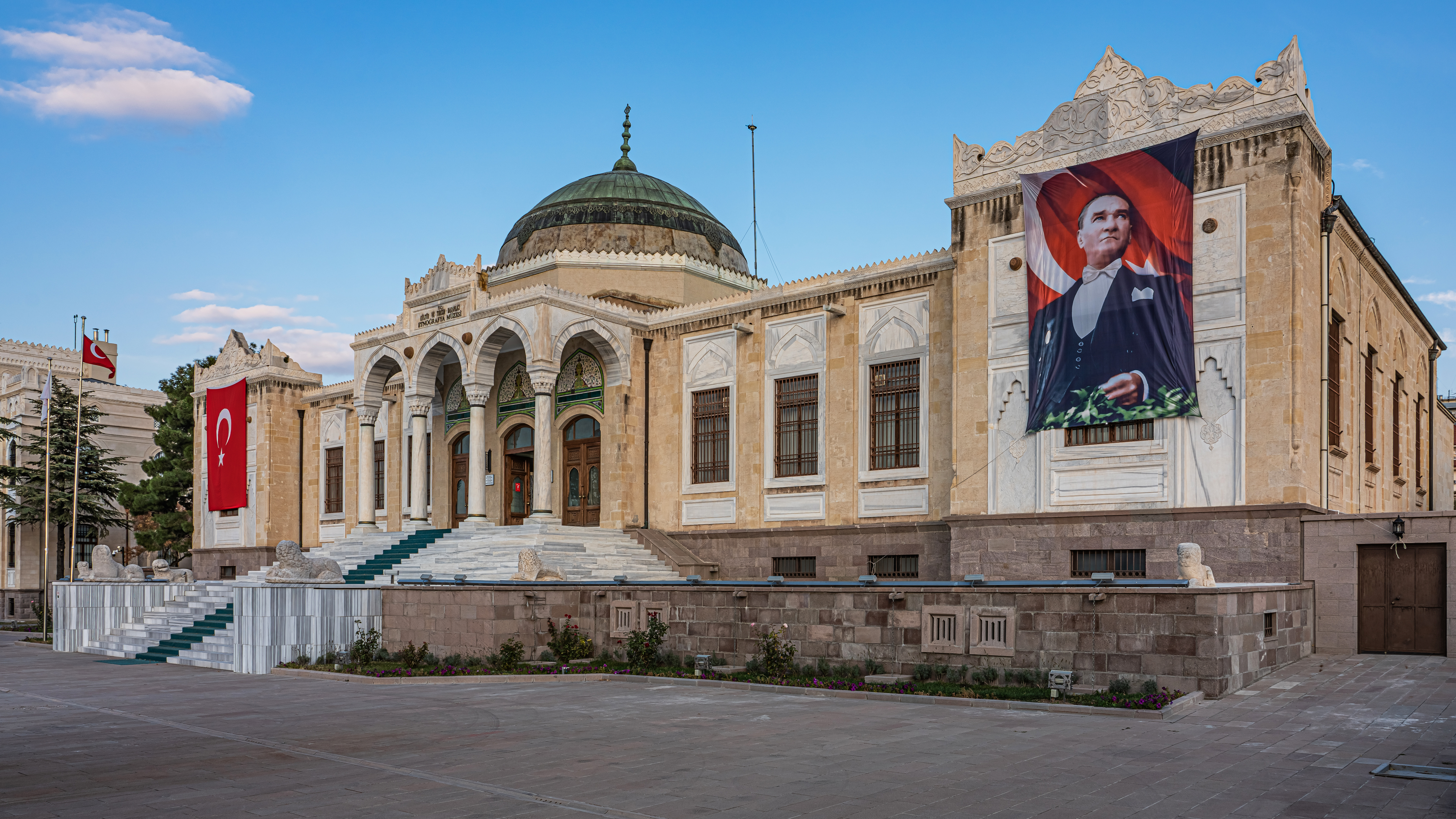
- Location: Turkey
- Coordinates: 39°55′58″N 32°51′18″E
- Type: museum
- Website: www.etnografyamuzesi.gov.tr
- Location of Ethnography Museum of Ankara

The Ethnography Museum of Ankara is dedicated to the cultures of Turkic civilizations. The building was designed by architect Arif Hikmet Koyunoğlu and was built between 1925 and 1928. The museum temporarily hosted the sarcophagus of Mustafa Kemal Atatürk from 1938 to 1953, during the period of the construction of Anıtkabir, his final resting place.

== Exhibitions ==
The Ethnography Museum contains the following items:

- Examples of Turkish art from the Seljuk period to the present time.
- Folk clothes, ornaments, shoes, clogs collected from various regions of Anatolia, women's and men's socks from Sivas region, various pouches, laces, circles, piqués, napkins, bundles, bedspreads, bridal dresses, groom's shaving sets are all a part of old traditional Turkish art.
- A collection of carpets and rugs from the regions of Uşak, Gördes, Bergama, Kula, Milas, Ladik, Karaman, Niğde, Kırşehir, which are among the centers of carpet weaving, with technical materials and patterns unique to the Turks.
- Among the examples of Anatolian metal art, are 15th century Mamluk cauldrons, Ottoman sherbet cauldrons, jug basin, tray, coffee tray, pans, bowls, candle scissors etc. There are various metal artifacts.
- Ottoman Period bows, arrows, flintlock pistols, rifles, swords, yataghans and an Ottoman Empire coat of arms with the tughra of Sultan Mahmud II embroidered on a satin cloth.
- Turkish porcelain and Kütahya porcelain, items related to Sufism and Tariqa, and beautiful examples of Turkish calligraphy.
- One of the most beautiful examples of Turkish woodworking: the throne of Seljuk Sultan Kaykhusraw III (13th century), Ahi Şerafettin Sarcophagus (14th century), Mihrab of Taşhur Pasha Mosque of Damsa Village in Ürgüp (12th century), Mimber of Siirt Ulu Mosque (12th century) and the Gate of the Çelebi Sultan Medresi Gate of Merzifon (15th century).
- The collection, which Besim Atalay, a member of the Turkish Grand National Assembly, donated to the museum, includes Turkish art from various periods.
- There is a specialized library in the museum, which includes works related to Anatolian ethnography and folklore, and art history.

== Temporary resting place of Atatürk ==
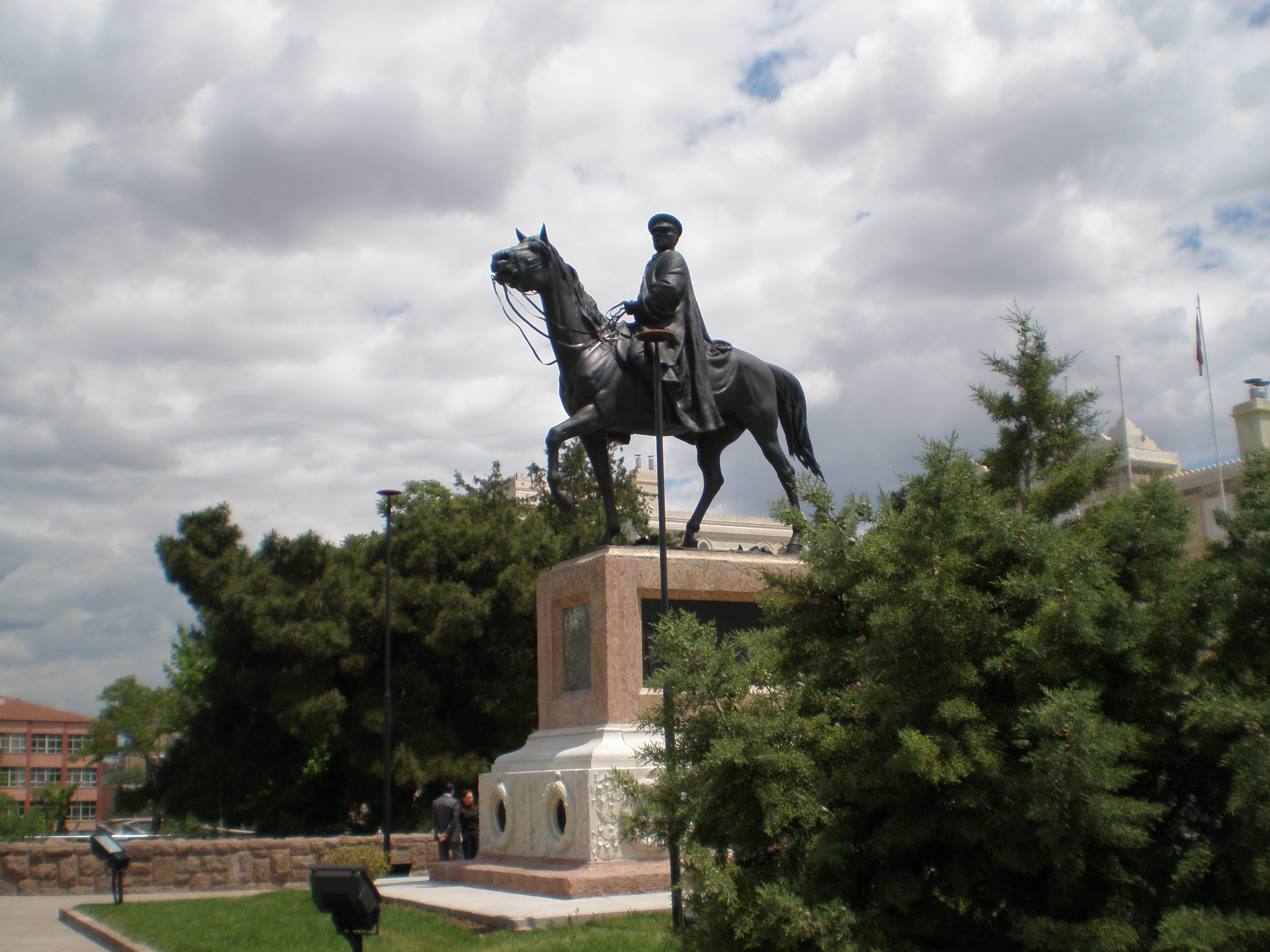
Statue of Atatürk

Following Atatürk's death on November 10, 1938, at Dolmabahçe Palace, Istanbul, his remains were transferred on November 19 by sea on the battlecruiser TCG Yavuz to Izmit and subsequently by train to Ankara, arriving on November 20. The casket was placed on a catafalque in the front of the Turkish Grand National Assembly building for Atatürk's state funeral. On November 21, 1938, his body was transported on a horse-drawn caisson to the Ethnography Museum of Ankara. British, Iranian and Yugoslavian guards of honor escorted the cortège to the museum.

Atatürk's mahogany casket was placed inside a white marble sarcophagus where it remained for nearly 15 years. On November 4, 1953, after the completion of Anıtkabır, his sarcophagus was opened in the presence of Parliament speaker Refik Koraltan, Prime Minister Adnan Menderes, Chief of General Staff Nuri Yamut and other officials. The casket was removed and placed on a catafalque in the museum, where it remained until November 10, 1953, on the 15th anniversary of his death. It was transferred to Anıtkabir on the same day, escorted by military honors on a caisson in a cortège.

== Gallery ==
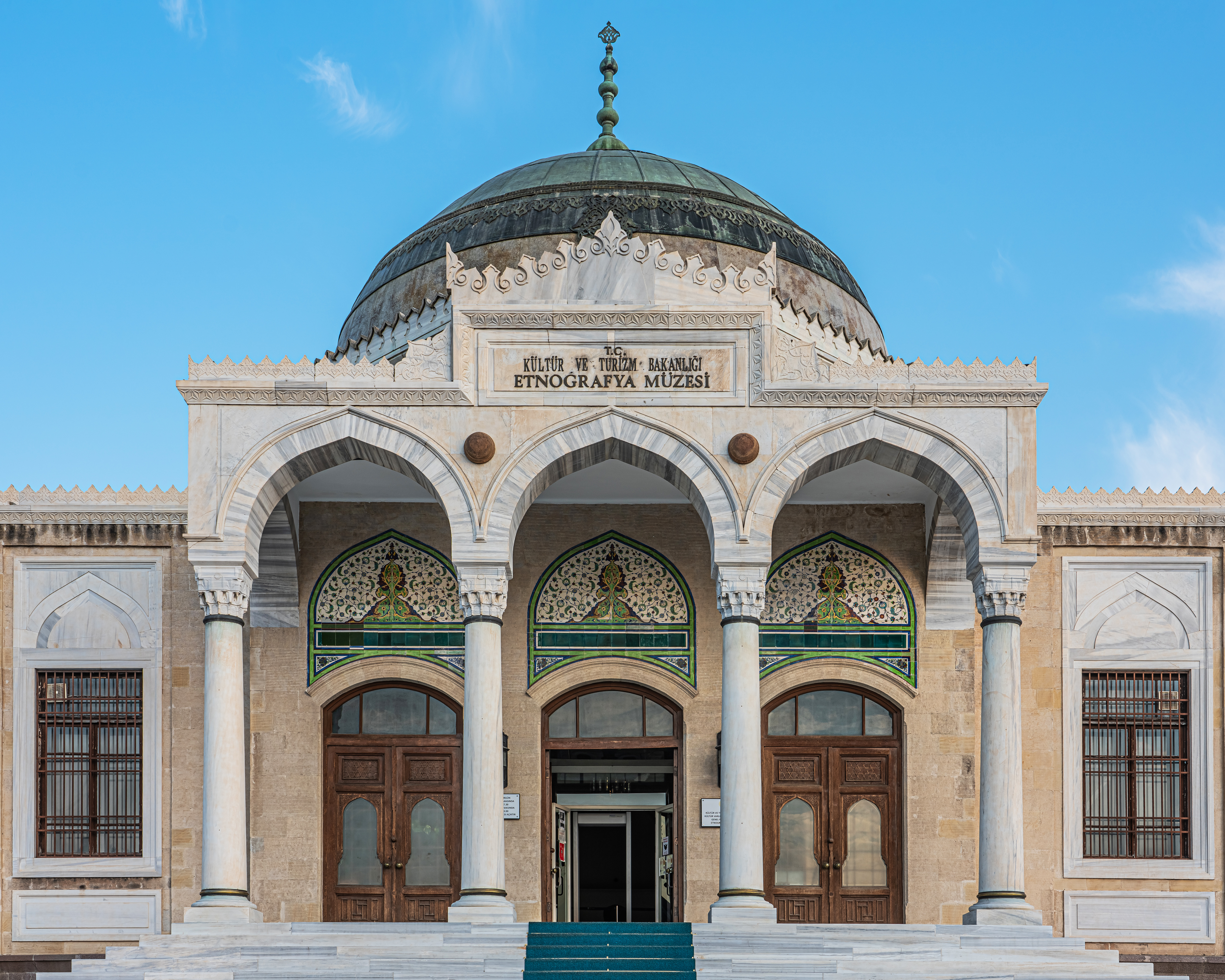
Front view of the Ethnography Museum in Ankara, Turkey

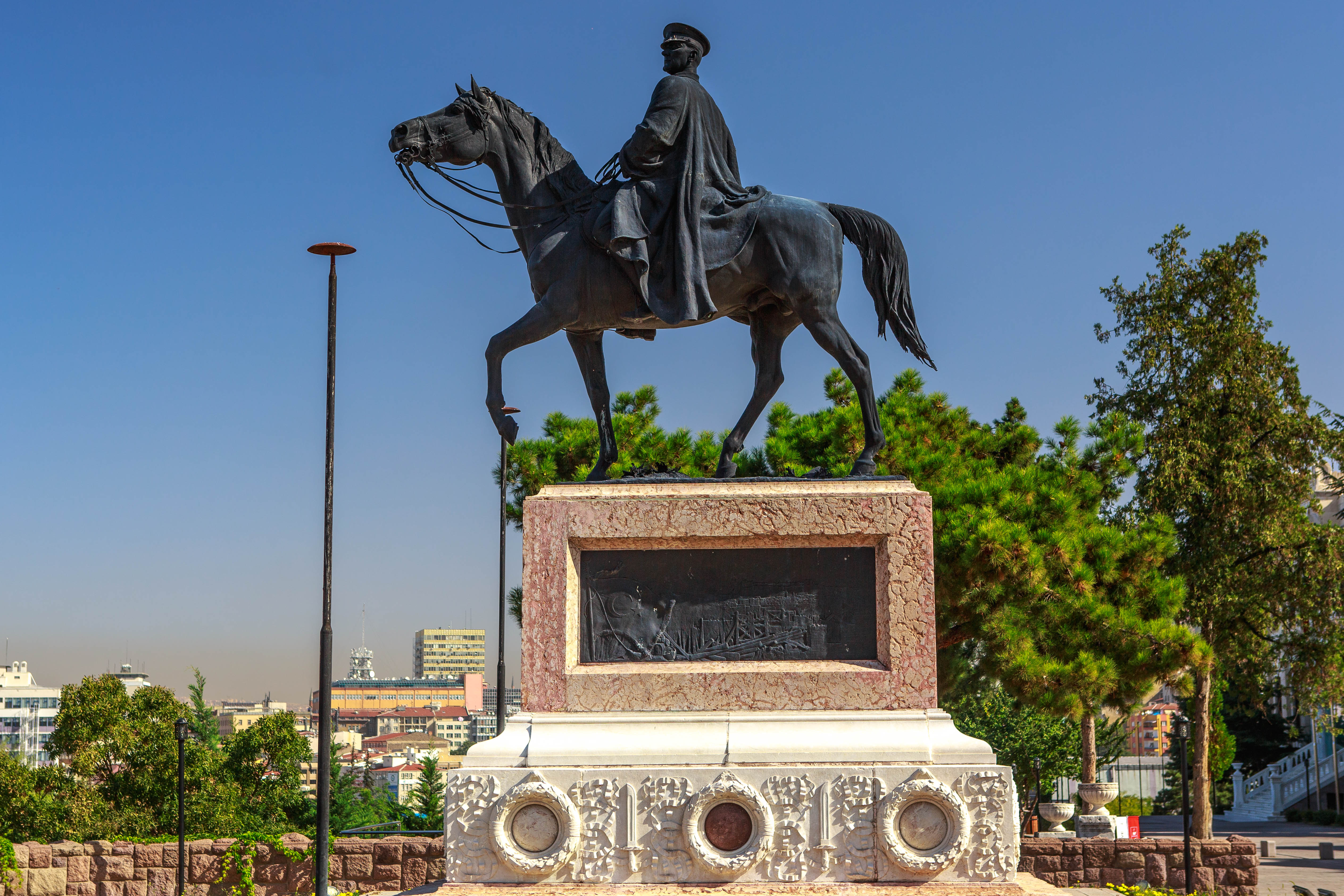
Statue of Atatürk

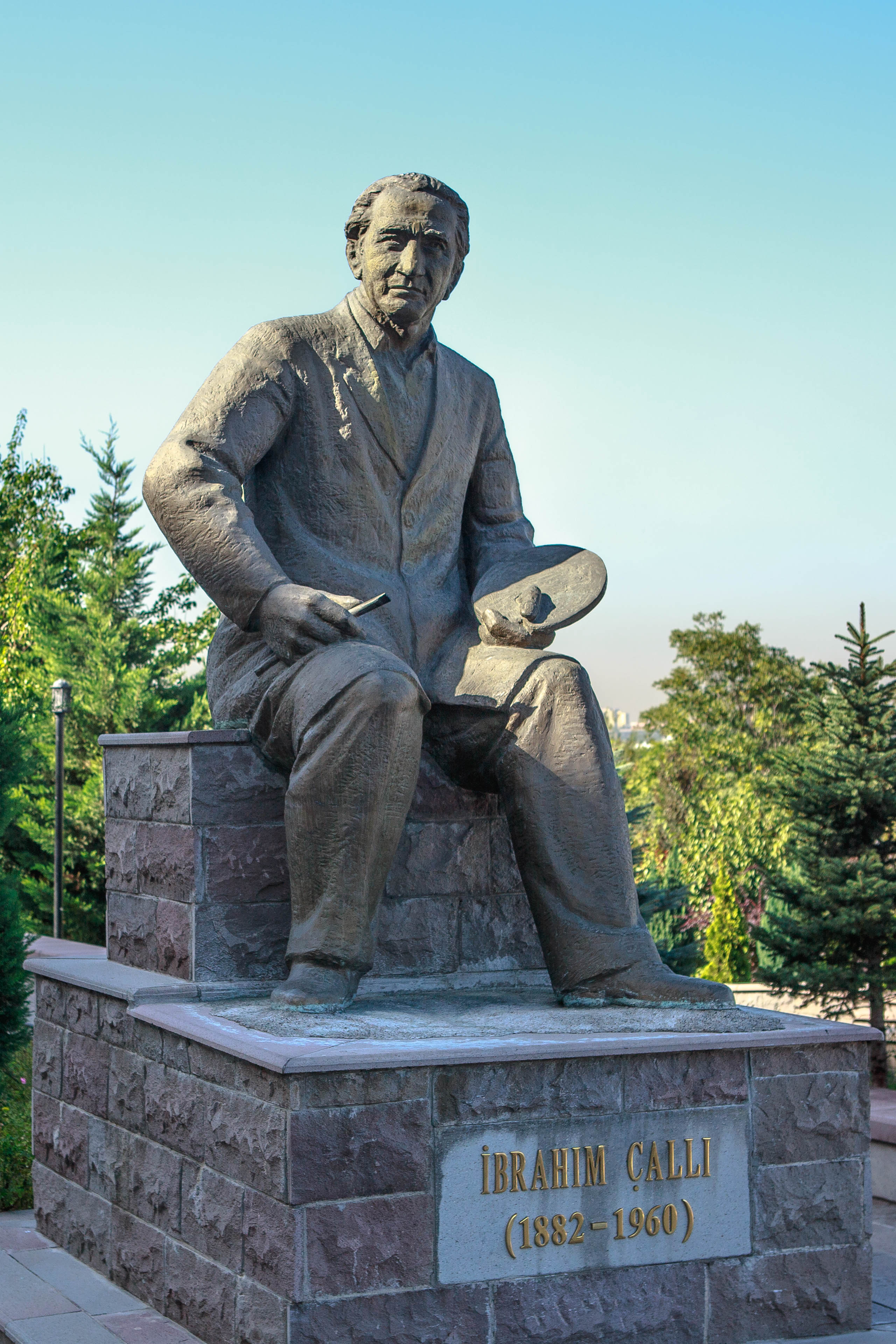
Statue of İbrahim Çallı

== See also ==
- State Art and Sculpture Museum
- Museum of Anatolian Civilizations
- List of Intangible Cultural Heritage elements in Turkey
