= State Art and Sculpture Museum =

Art museum in Ankara, Turkey

- Resim ve Heykel Müzesi
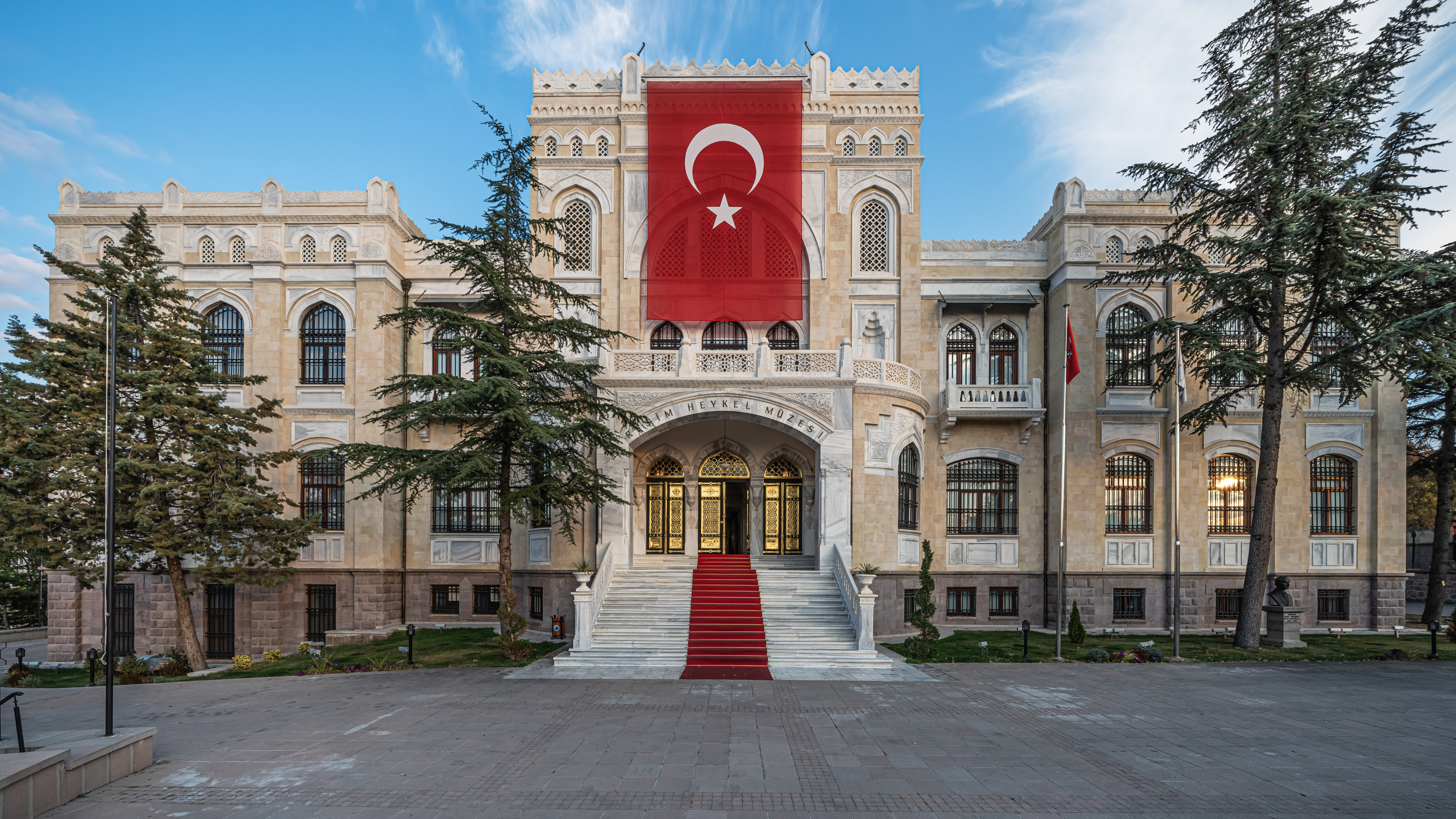
- State Art and Sculpture Museum in Ankara, built between 1927 and 1930.

- Location of State Art and Sculpture Museum
- Established: 1980; 46 years ago
- Location: Ankara, Turkey
- Coordinates: 39.933056°N 32.855833°E
- Type: Fine arts

The State Art and Sculpture Museum (Turkish: Resim ve Heykel Müzesi) is a museum dedicated to fine arts and sculpture in Ankara, Turkey. The museum was opened in 1930 upon the direction of Turkish president Mustafa Kemal Atatürk, the founder and first President of Turkey. It is located close to the Ethnography Museum and houses a rich collection of Turkish art from the late 19th century to the present day. There are also galleries for guest exhibitions.

== History ==
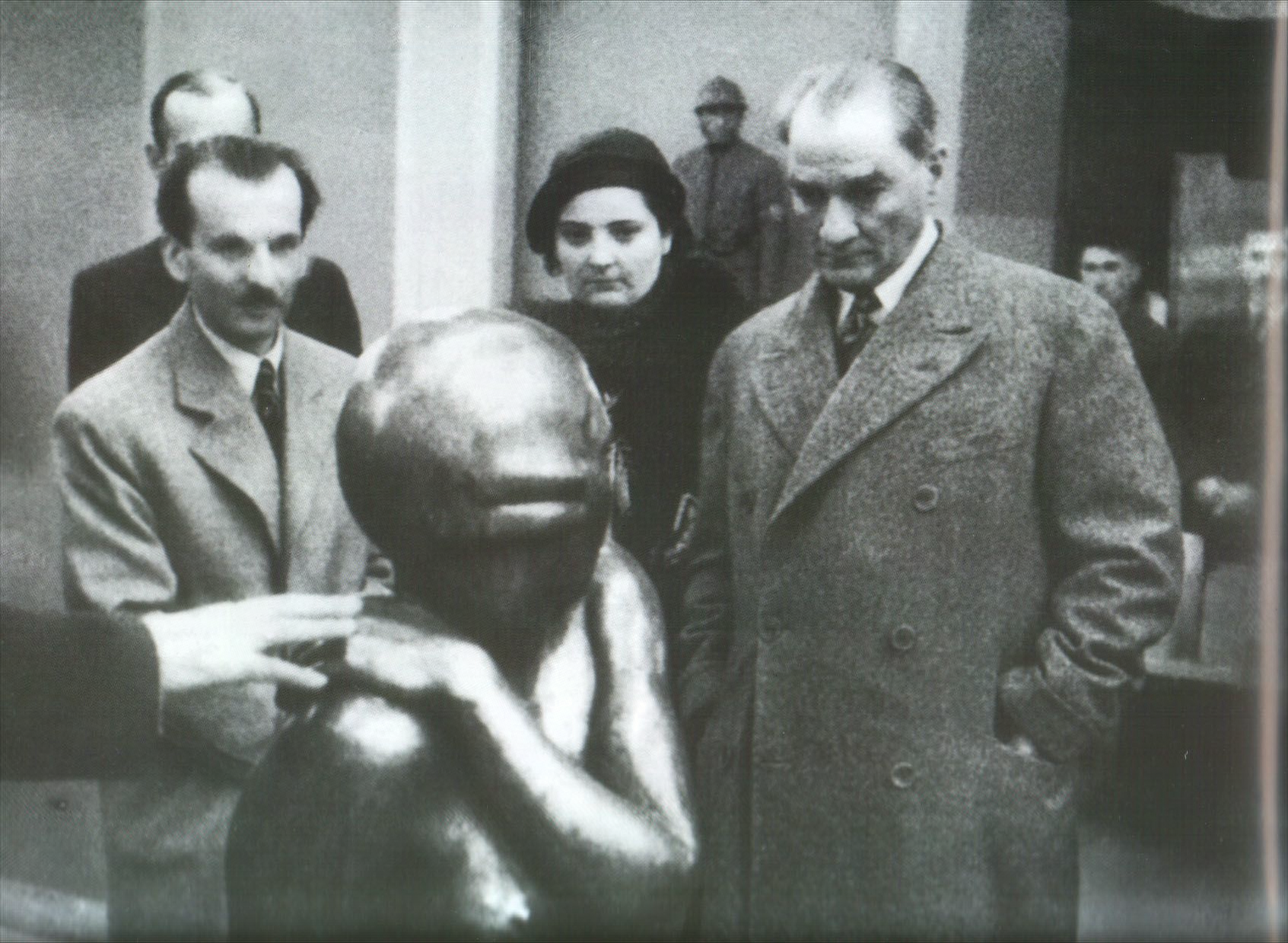
Atatürk at the opening of the museum, 1934, Ankara

Originally the building of the museum was used by the organization of the Turkish Hearths, which held activities that were mostly concentrated on Turkish culture and education and on raising the social, economic and intellectual level of the Turkish people. The building was designed in 1927 by architect Arif Hikmet Koyunoğlu and built between 1927 and 1930. When the Turkish Hearths was closed down by the Turkish gouverment, upon the direction of Turkish president Mustafa Kemal Atatürk the building was to become a Turkish art museum, which highlighted painting and sculpture.

The museum was established in light of Atatürk's reforms. At the beginning of the Turkish republic fine arts such as painting and sculpture were rarely practised in Turkey due to the Islamic tradition of avoiding idolatry. Due to his modernization efforts, Atatürk wanted to change that. Atatürk sought to create a new sense of national identity through the promotion of the arts. Atatürk believed that culture should be the foundation of the Turkish Republic.

The museum underwent a large restoration in 1980. During the restoration of the building in 1980, and in the following years, another important point on which considerable stress was laid is the construction of workshops of painting, sculpture and ceramics, which serve artists, both amateur and professional. The museum was again restored in 2011 to increase the exhibition spaces, restore the roof as well as other security measures. In the historical hall which has been transformed to its original design during the restorations, different kinds of activities such as concerts, theatrical performances and movie projections take place.

== Museum ==
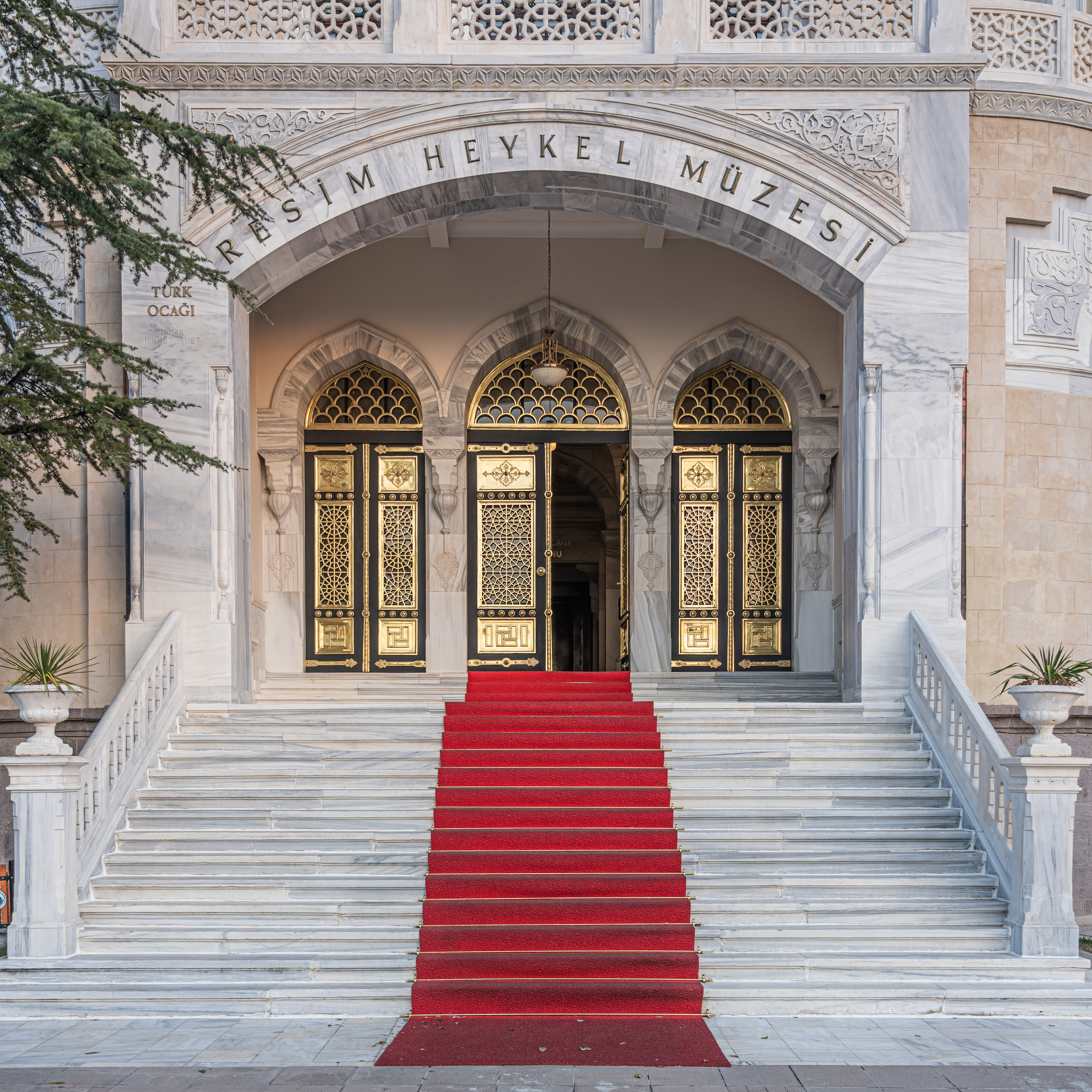
Exterior view of the museum's main entrance.

Today, the museum is a center of art where significant works of the artists who played important roles in the development of Turkish painting and sculpture are exhibited. In addition to the collections of art works reflecting the formation and development periods of Turkish plastic arts, and its classification, and to the Library of Plastic Arts which fills the gap in this field (enriched every year by the donations of domestic or foreign resources, or by new purchases), the archives of Turkish artists satisfactorily respond to the needs of researchers working in these fields.

The museum includes a cafeteria, sales outlet and an audio system. As for the security measures, the whole building is furnished with closed-circuit TV, ultrasonic and firealarm systems for controlling all parts of the museum.

The protection of the works of fine arts, which is one of the most important responsibilities of the museum beside training, is done by employing a method particularly developed to ensure the most satisfactory results when dealing with the problems arising from temperature, humidity and sorting difficulties. Any damage due to aging which may occur in spite of all protection measures are restored by experts in the special restoration unit which has been set up as a separate division within the museum.

== Collection and exhibitions ==
In addition to the workshop where painting and traditional printing courses are held (and demanded by the public beyond the capacity of the museum), special workshops for Turkish ornamental arts, ceramic, and sculpture will be opened in the near future.

Exhibitions of painting, sculpture, ceramic, printing arts and photography that are programmed to take place in Turkey within the framework of international cultural agreements, are exhibited in the three galleries reserved for periodical exhibitions; thus, the art works of foreign countries are made known to the Turkish public. In addition, exhibitions of Turkish artworks selected from the permanent collection of the museum are organized in foreign countries, within the framework of international cultural agreements. Besides these exhibitions, retrospective exhibitions organized by the General Directorate of Fine Arts; individual exhibitions and competitive exhibitions are among the other activities of the museum.

== Gallery ==
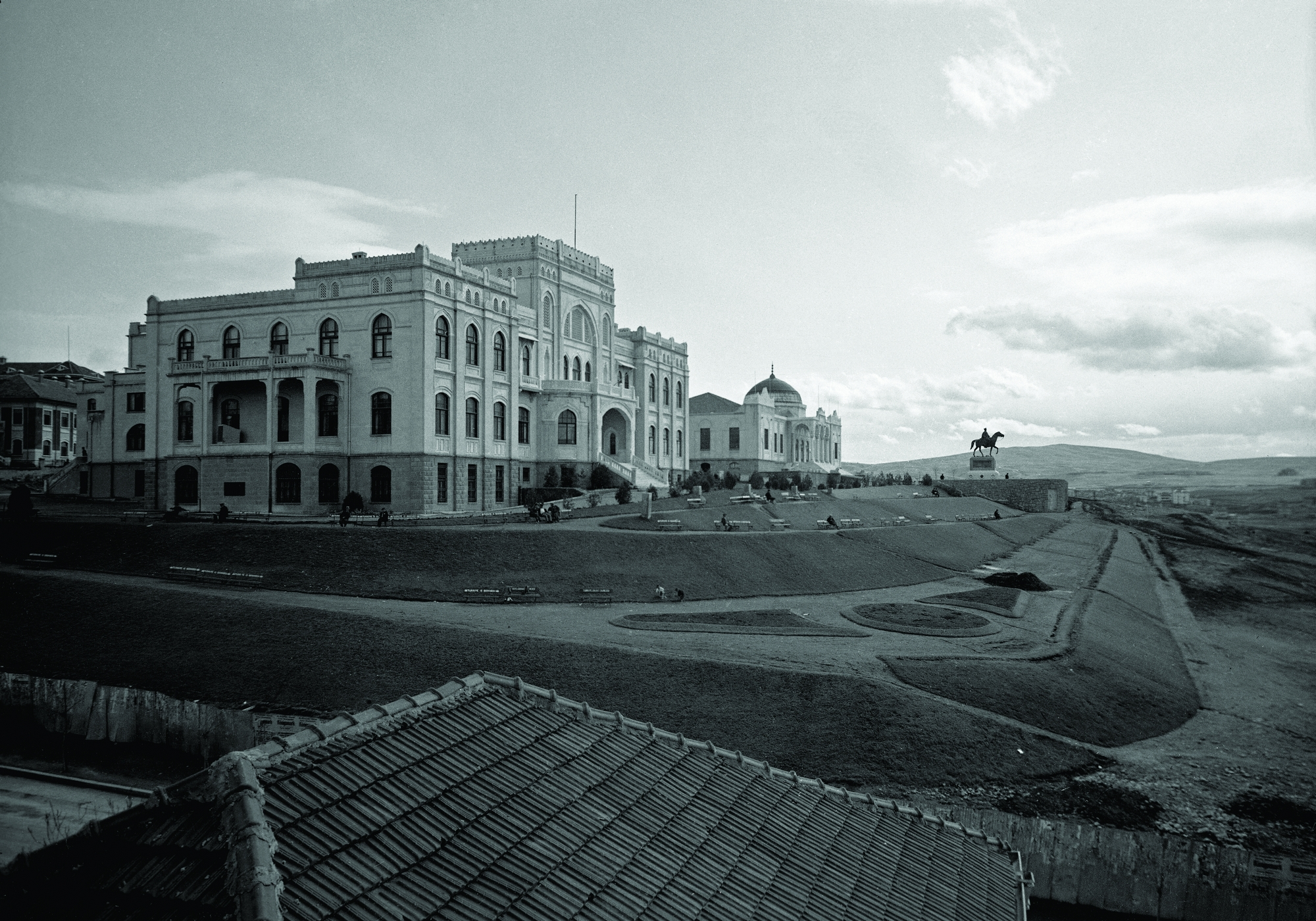

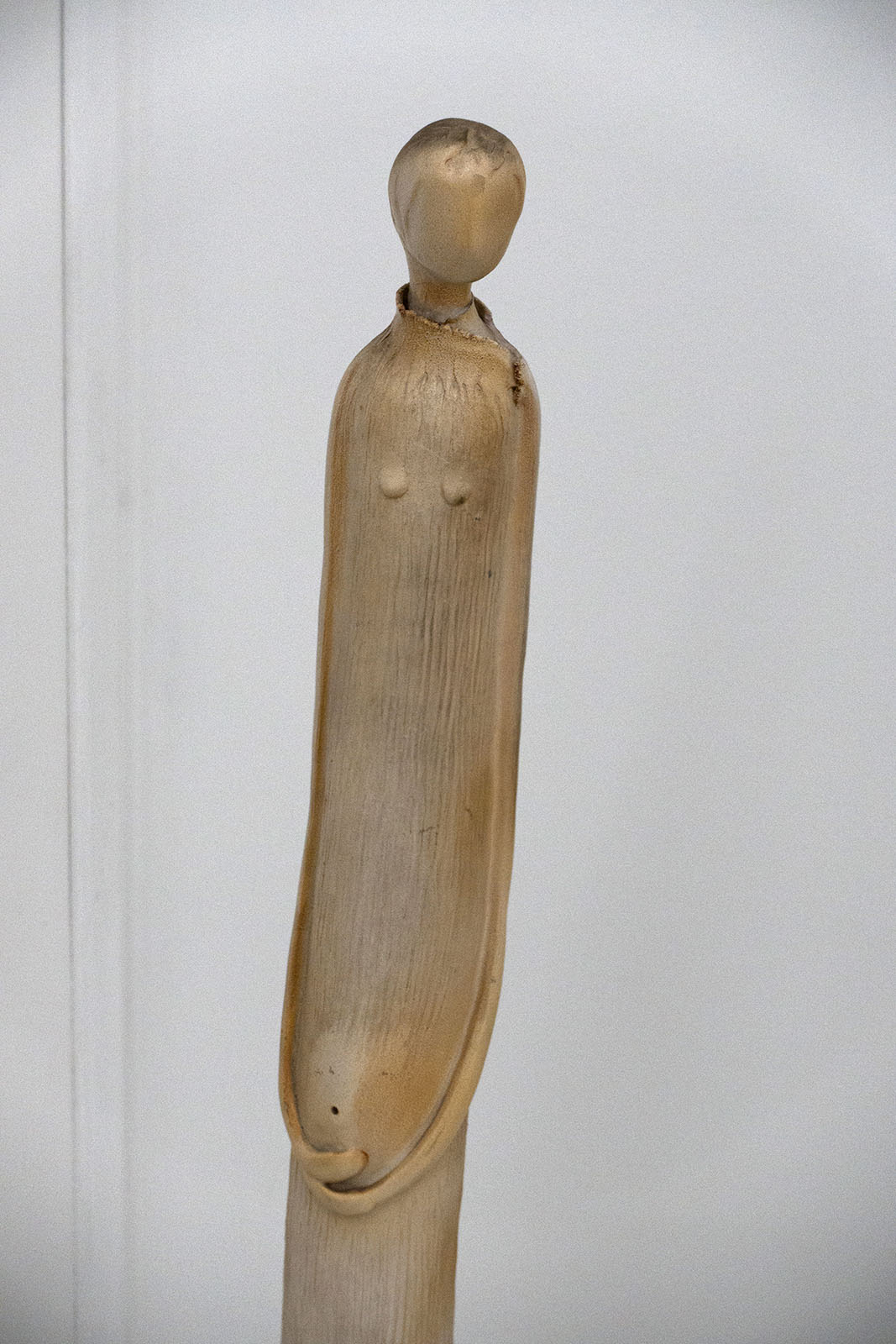
State Art and Sculpture Museum Figure

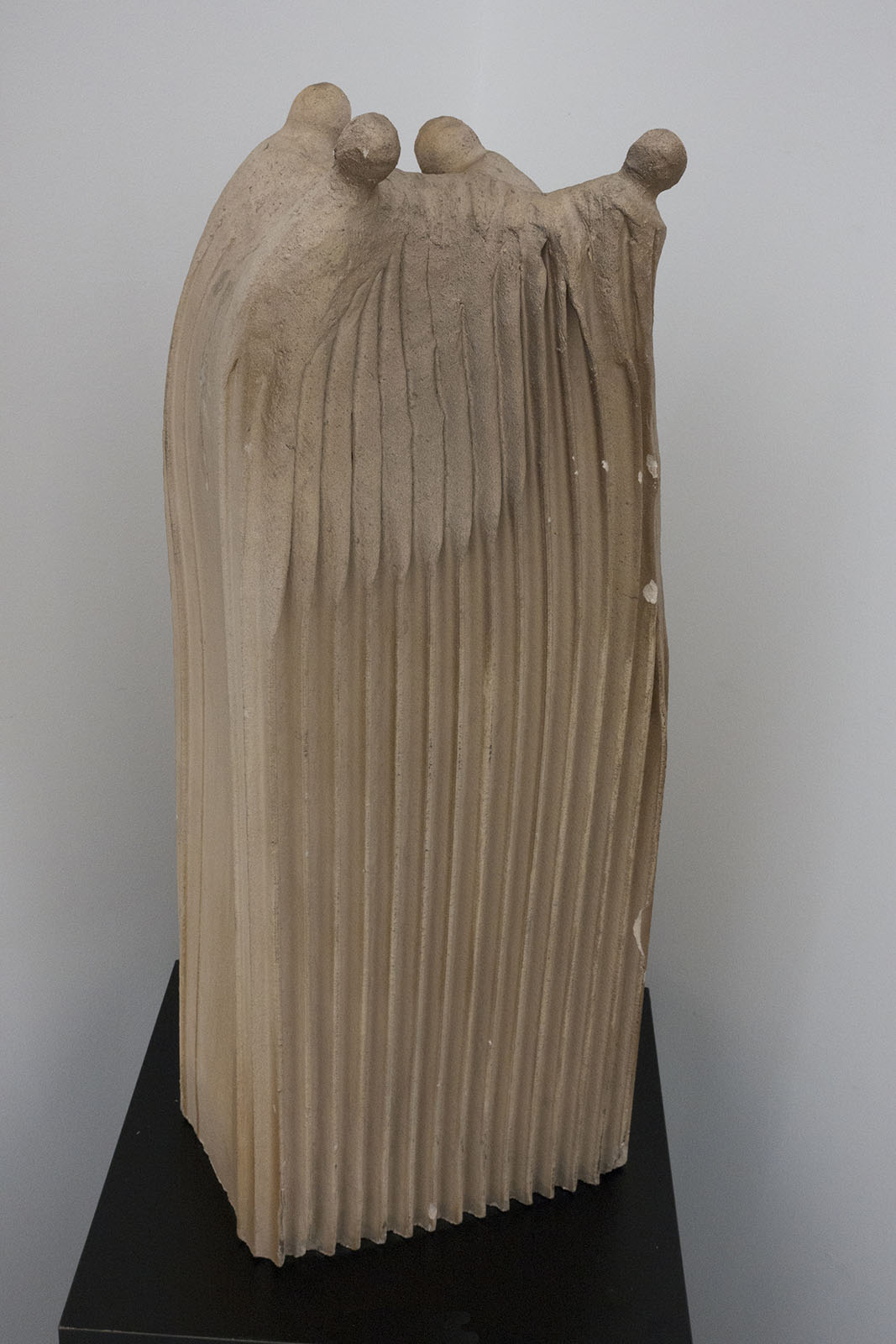
State Art and Sculpture Museum Composition

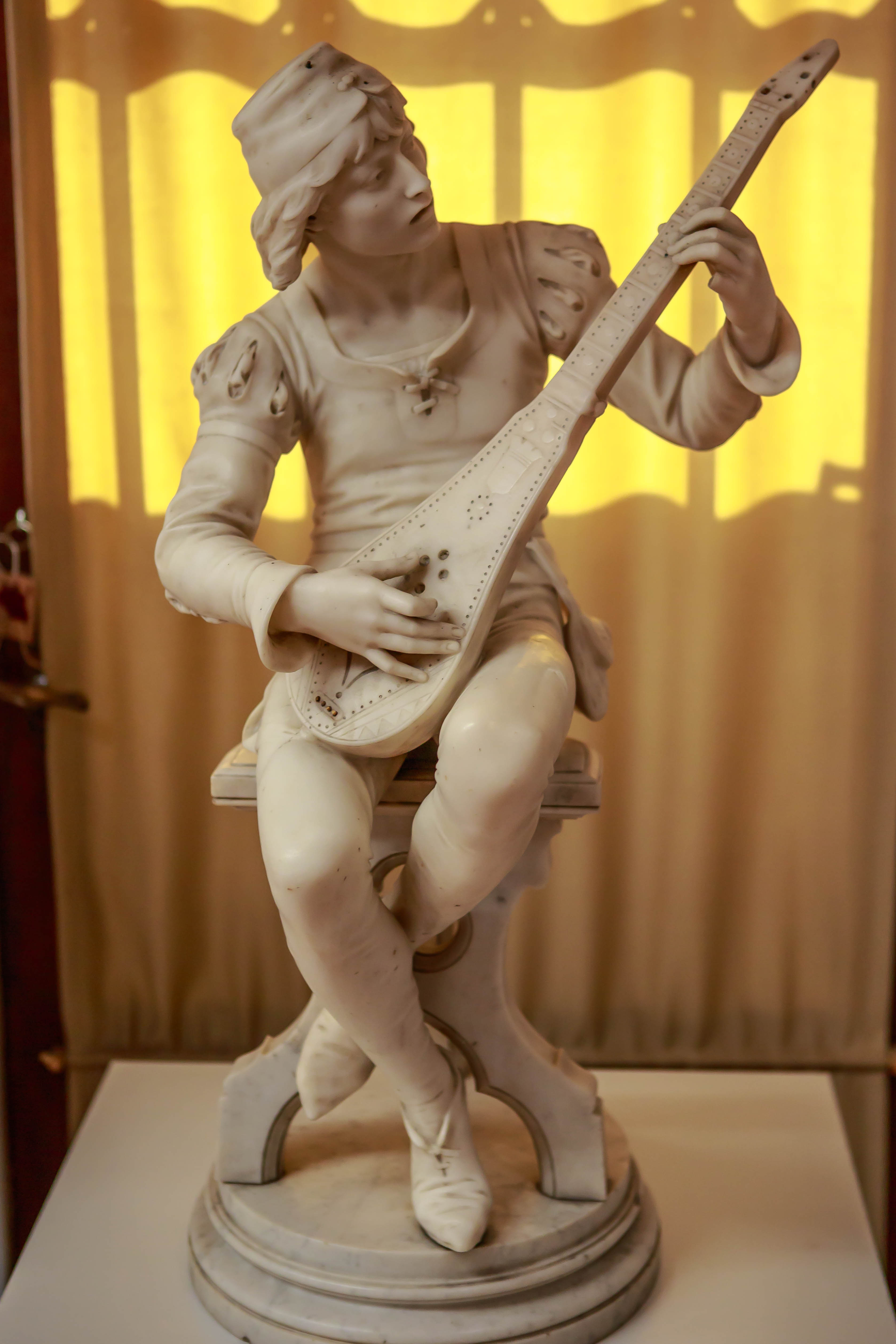

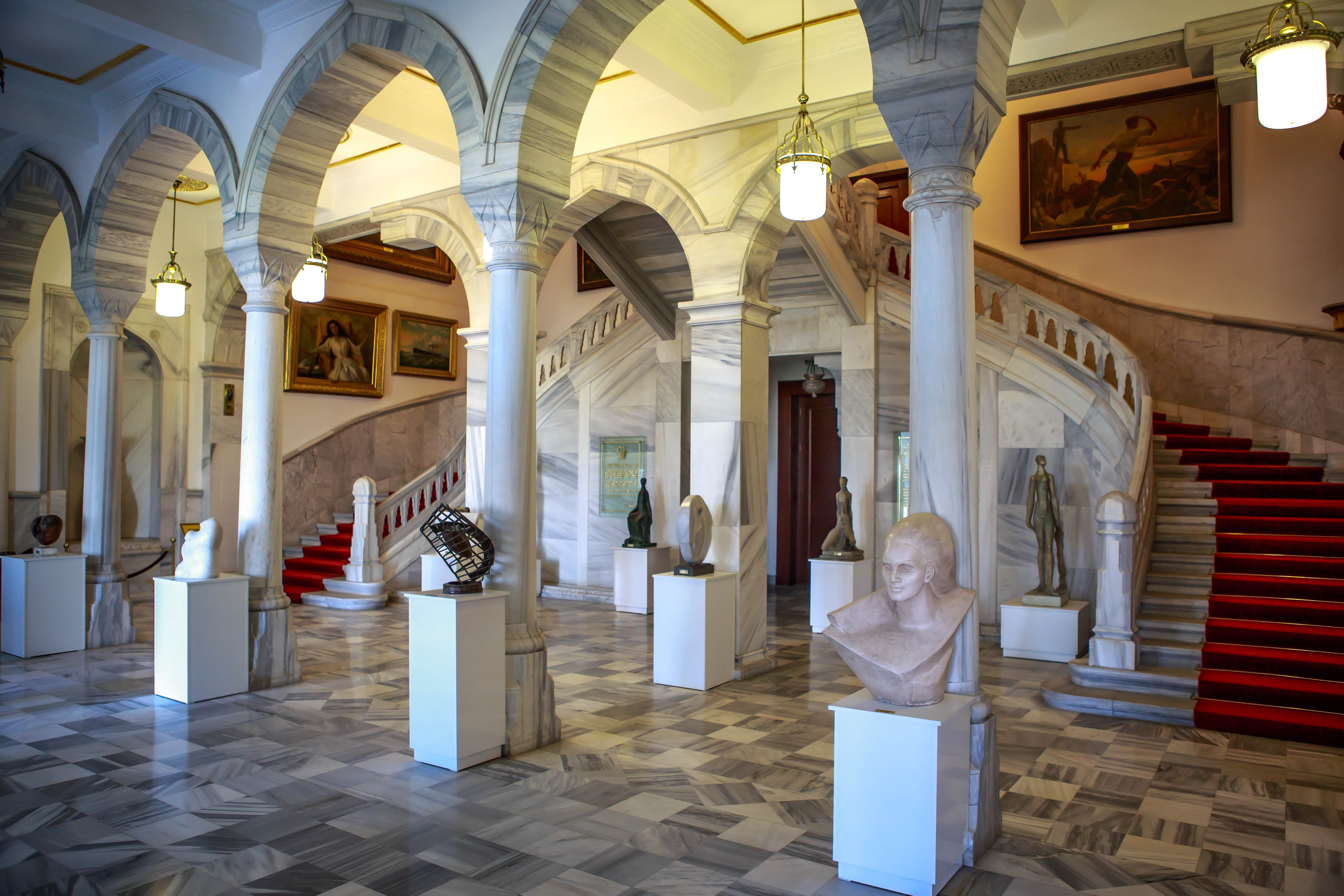

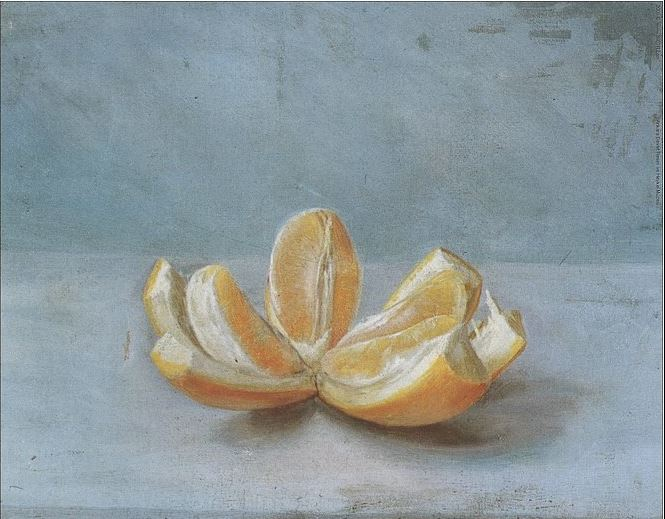

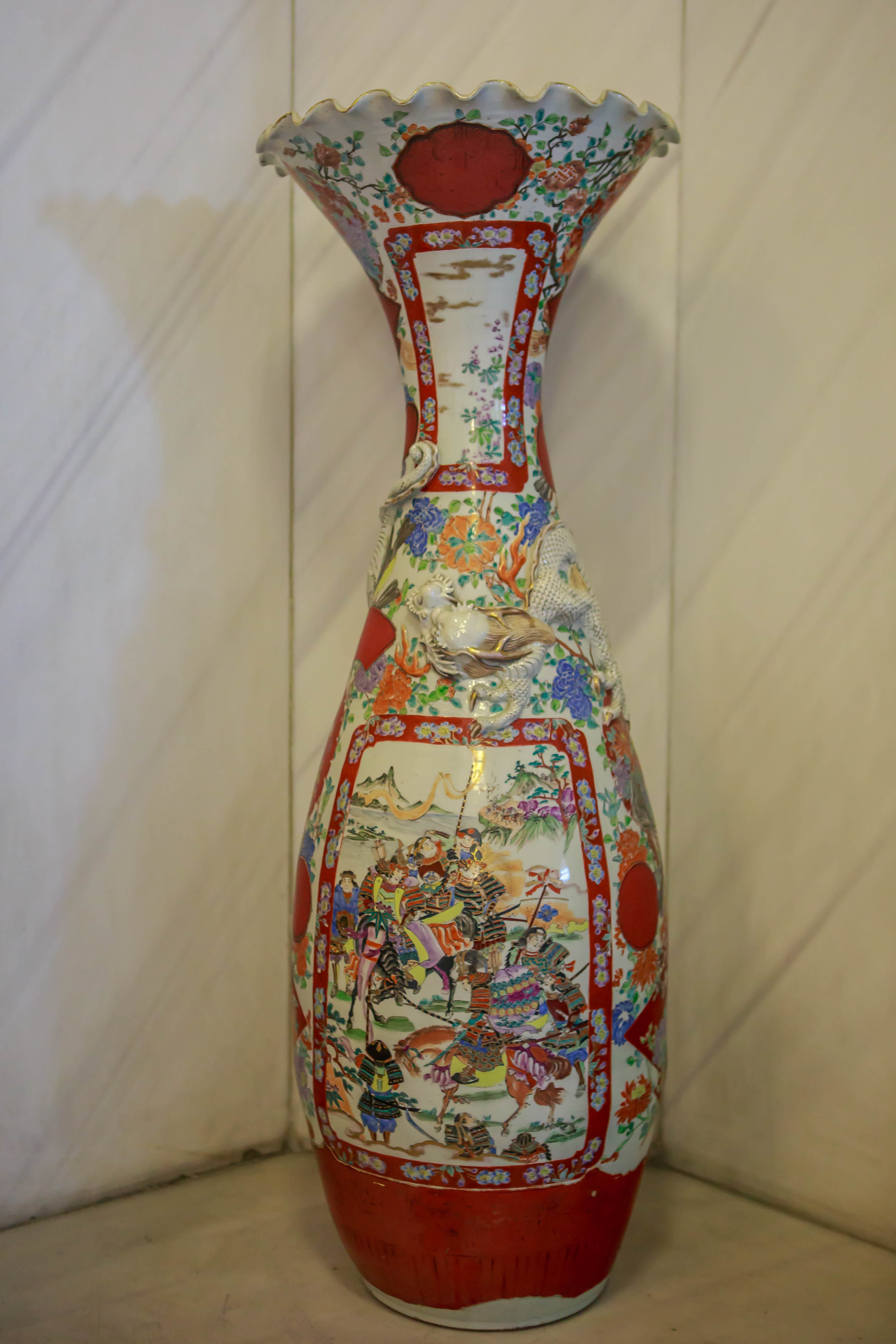

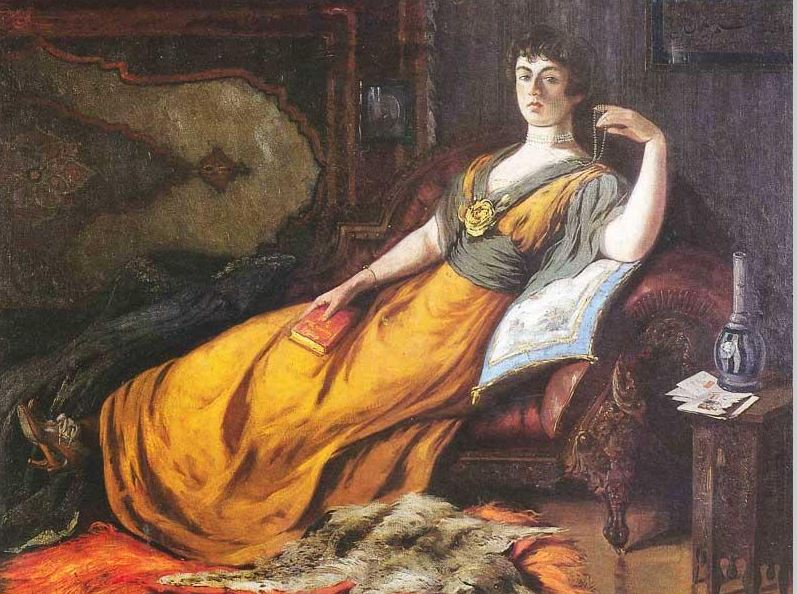
"Haremde Goethe" by Caliph Abdulmecid II, depicting his Circassian wife reading Goethe

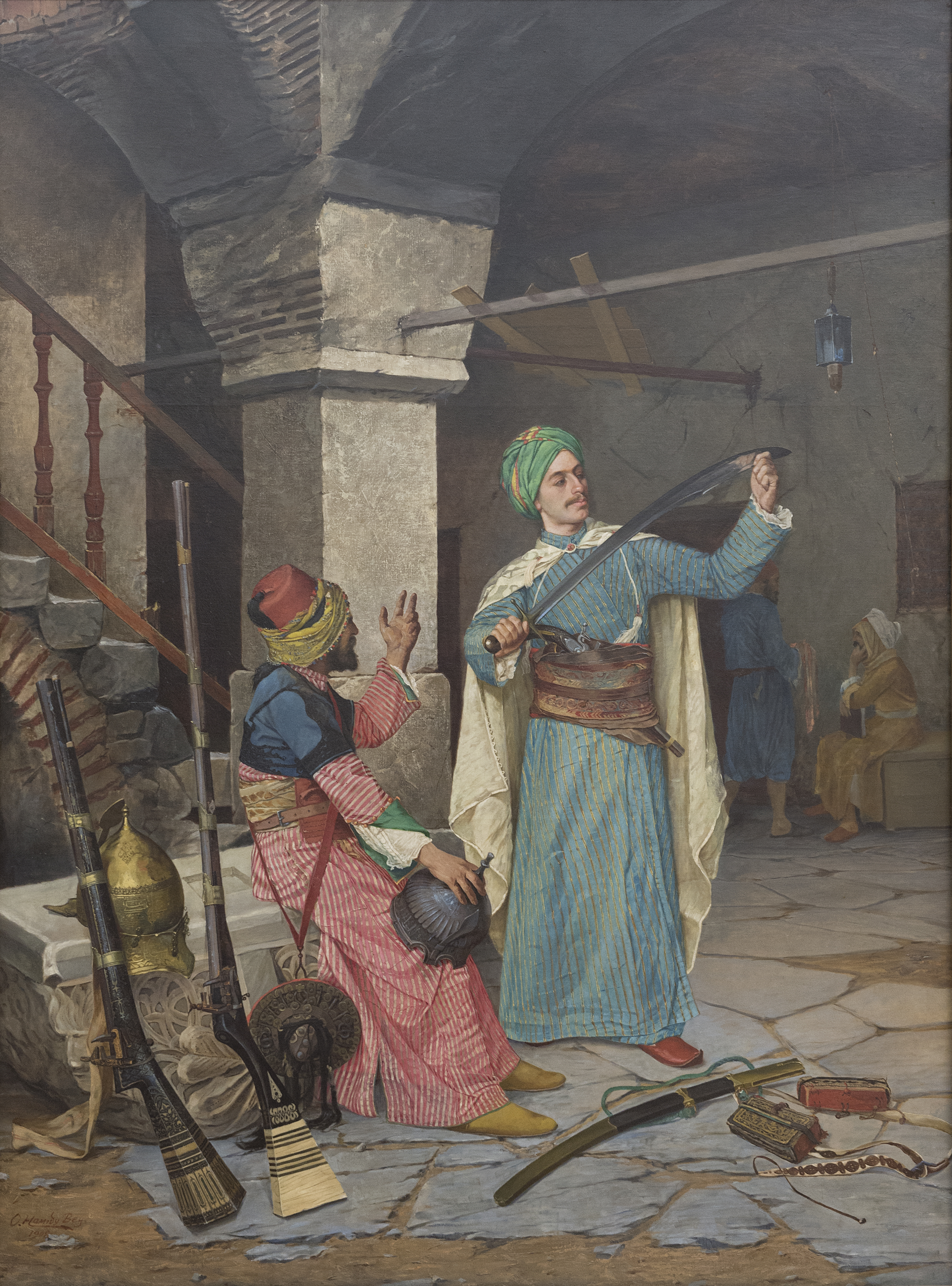
State Art and Sculpture Museum Weapons' Merchant

== See also ==
- Ethnography Museum of Ankara
- Museum of Anatolian Civilizations
- List of Intangible Cultural Heritage elements in Turkey
- Çengelhan Rahmi M. Koç Museum
- War of Independence Museum
