= Arif Hikmet Koyunoğlu =

Turkish architect

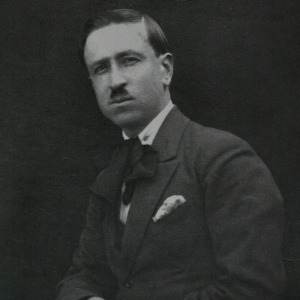
Arif Hikmet Koyunoğlu

Arif Hikmet Koyunoğlu (1888 - 1982 in Selanik, Ottoman Empire) was a Turkish architect best known for his work on the State Art and Sculpture Museum in Ankara, Turkey.

He died at the age of 94.

== Image gallery ==
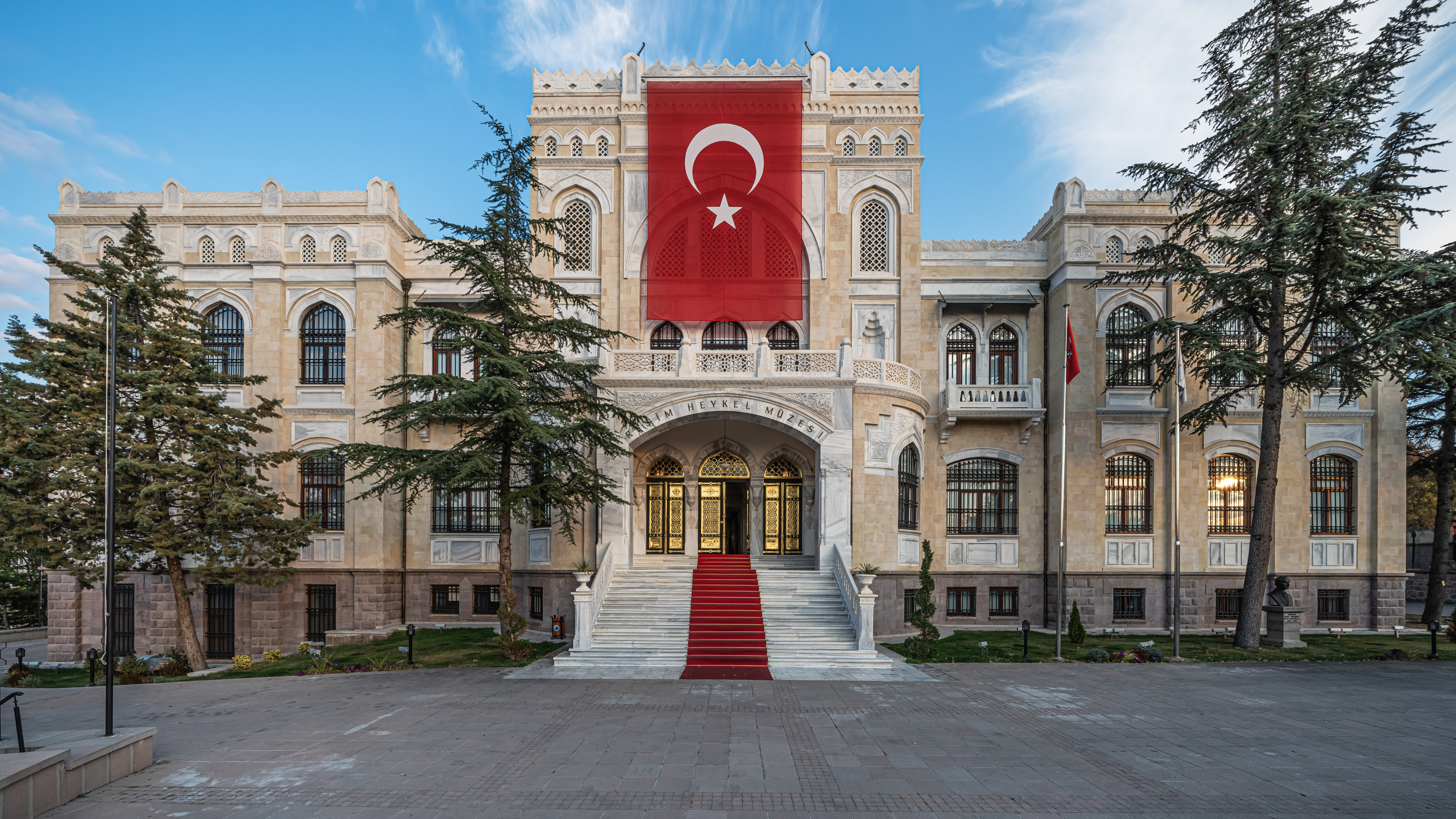
State Art and Sculpture Museum (1927–30)
