= Nasrullah =

Nasrullah may refer to:

- Nasrullah (horse) (1940–1959), British Thoroughbred racehorse
- Nasrullah (name), a name (including a list of people with the name)
- Nasrullah Bridge, a 16th-century bridge in Kastamonu, Turkey
- Nasrullah Mosque, a 16th-century mosque in Kastamonu, Turkey

== See also ==
- Nasrallah
- Nasrallah, Tunisia, a city in the Kairouan Governorate
