= Nasrullah Bridge =

Nasrullah Bridge Nasrullah Köprüsü
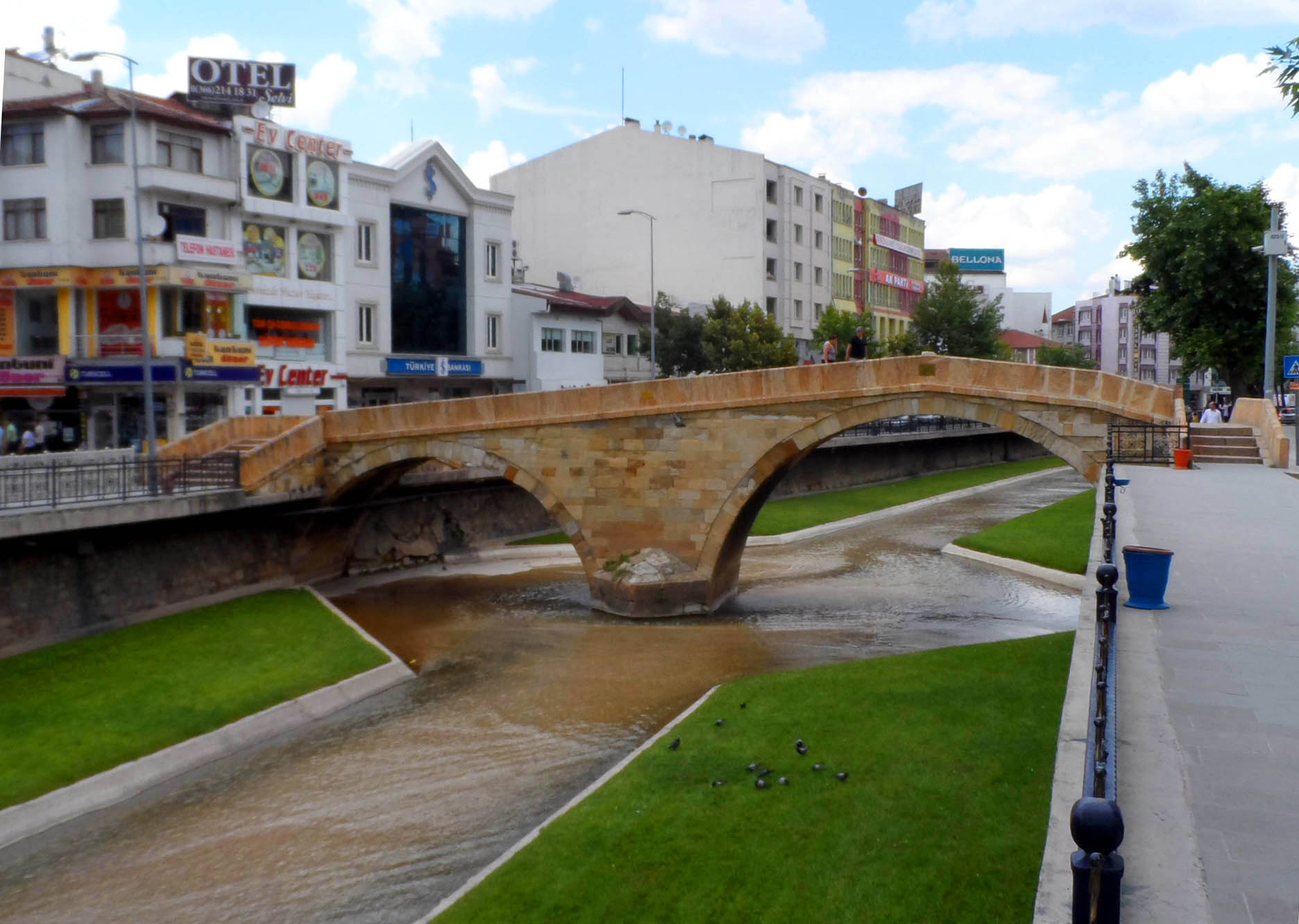
- Nasrullah Bridge in Kastamonu, Turkey
- Coordinates: 41.37750°N 33.77639°E
- Crosses: Karaçomak Creek
- Locale: Kastamonu, Turkey
- Other name(s): "Hunchback Bridge" (Turkish: Kambur Köprü)
- Named for: Kadı Nasrullah

Characteristics
- Design: Arch bridge
- Material: Stone
- Total length: 40 m (130 ft) (originally)
- Width: 4 m (13 ft)
- Piers in water: 1

History
- Construction end: 1501

Statistics
- Daily traffic: Pedestrian

Nasrullah Bridge, also known locally as the Hunchback Bridge, (Turkish: Nasrullah Köprüsü or Kambur Köprü) is a 16th-century stone arch bridge in Kastamonu, Turkey.

The bridge is located in the city center over Karaçomak Creek, a tributary of Gökırmak, connecting western and eastern parts of the city. Nasrullah Mosque is to the west and the Kastamonu Governor's Office is to the east. It was endowed as a waqf in 1501 by Kadı Nasrullah, who was a judge in the Ottoman Empire.

The ashlar-constructed bridge had originally five arches. It was 40 m (130 ft) long and 4 m (13 ft) wide. The main arch span was 12.0 m (39.4 ft) and the others 8.5 m (28 ft) in length. It underwent three major reparations, the last two times in 1709 and in 1946. During the last reparation, a staircase was added to each end of the bridge when the west-most one arch and the east-most two arches were ripped off. Today, the bridge has two arches only. The two original stone alms pots and the curbstones on the bridge are still preserved. Due to its unusual appearance, it is dubbed by the citizens the Hunchback Bridge (Turkish: Kambur Köprü).

The Minister of Forestry Veysel Eroğlu announced in 2016 that the bridge will be reconstructed to its original form.
