= Mimar Kemaleddin =

Turkish architect (1870–1927)

Ahmed Kemaleddin
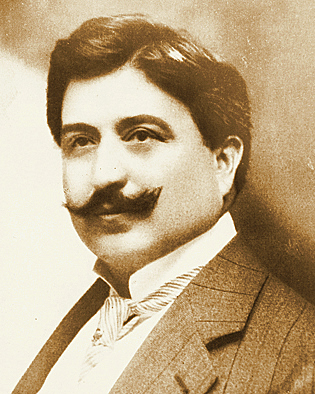
- An old photograph of Mimar Kemaleddin
- Born: 1870; Acıbadem, Istanbul, Ottoman Empire
- Died: 13 July 1927 (aged 56–57); Ulus, Ankara, Turkey
- Education: Hendese-i Mülkiye Mektebi; Technische Hochschule Charlottenburg
- Occupation: Architect
- Children: İlhan Mimaroğlu
- Buildings: Tayyare Apartments, Ankara Palas, Bebek Mosque

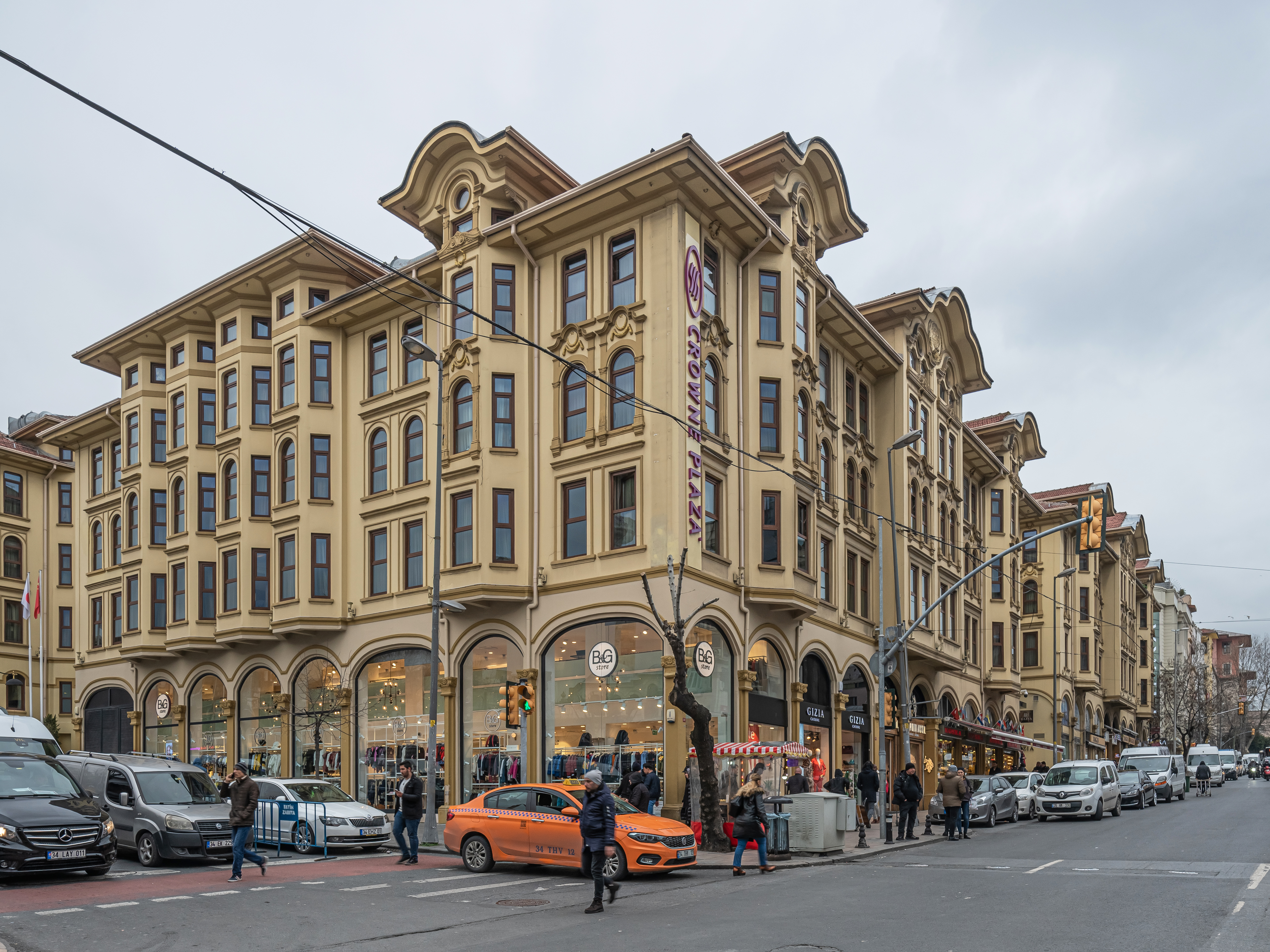
Tayyare Apartments, today the "Crowne Plaza Hotel Istanbul Old City", designed by Mimar Kemaleddin Bey

Ahmed Kemaleddin (Ottoman Turkish: احمد كمال الدين; 1870 – 13 July 1927), widely known as Mimar Kemaleddin (Architect Kemaleddin) was a Turkish architect, and one of the leading figures of the First National architectural movement, alongside Vedat Tek.

== Early years ==
Ahmed Kemaleddin was born in 1870 to a middle-class Ottoman family in the Acıbadem neighborhood of Istanbul. His father was Miralay Ali Bey, a naval captain, and his mother was Sadberk Hanım. In 1875, he began with his primary education at the İbrahim Ağa Primary School. He continued his secondary education in 1881 in Crete, then part of the Ottoman Empire, due to his father's assignment. Returning soon after to Istanbul, he graduated from high school.

In 1887, at the age of 17, he enrolled in the School of Civil Engineering (Ottoman Turkish: Hendese-i Mülkiye Mektebi, now Istanbul Technical University). Kemaleddin graduated as an engineer with honours in 1891. He then remained at his alma mater and worked as an assistant for four years. During this period, he created his own works in his office he had opened outside the university.

In 1895, promoted by his scholar German architect August Jachmund, designer of the Sirkeci Railway Terminal in Istanbul, and supported by a state scholarship, he went to Germany, where he was educated two years in architecture at the Technische Hochschule Charlottenburg in Berlin. Afterwards, he worked 2 1/2 years in various architecture offices gaining professional experience.

In 1900, Ahmed Kemaleddin returned home and resumed work at the university. Following the departure of August Jachmund, he assumed his post as lecturer. In 1908, he played a pioneering role in the formation of the first vocational organization for engineers and architects in the Ottoman Empire, the "Society of Ottoman Architects and Engineers".

== Designing and building ==
Whilst still a student at the Hendese-i Mulkıye (State School of Engineering) where he commenced his studies in 1887 he received the Medal for Industry. He must have been hardworking and creative. These personal attributes may have been related to his greater interest in the lessons of Prof. Jasmund on architecture than in engineering and to the fact that Prof. Jasmund chose him as his assistant.

Kemaleddin showed himself to be a designer open to learning and experimentation and is also a portrayal of a self-reliant architect.

However great an influence Jasmund and the German connections are on his perception of design, the wide scope of his references is also important. The Art Nouveau of Ratip Pasha Mansion, a building of the early era, or the connection of Harikzedegan Apartments with French public housing, the Orientalist flavour in the design of the Evkaf-ı Humayun Nezareti (Ministry of Imperial Foundations), the eclectic style of the 3rd Foundation Han or the Empire line of the Husnu Pasha Tomb cannot be ignored.

A Kemaleddin work doubtless presents an image overflowing with ideological connections. Only here his creativity also feeds his ideology. The transformation of his ideology into a school of architecture is essentially down to his creative talent and self-confidence, if also fed by his industriousness and organisational expertise or teaching skill/teaching discipline. His life was already over when he ascertained the eventuality of this confidence being shaken. His architecture was a tale that prevented the hero from experiencing a tragic end, from an untimely death.

== Restorer with principles ==
On 18 May 1909, Kemaleddin was appointed head of architecture at the Imperial Ministry of Foundations. Kemaleddin balanced the need to maintain and restore historical buildings with the designing of new ones. He restored many Ottoman monumental structures.

His restoration of the Mescid-i Aksa won him an award from the Royal Institute of British Architects.

== Teaching and organizing ==
On graduation from the Hendese-i Mülkiye he was appointed to the teaching staff of Technology and Architecture at the same school and as Prof. Jasmund's assistant. On his return from Germany where he went to gain knowledge and experience he took up his post at the Hendese-i Mulkiye again. And from that point on he continued to teach. He educated hundreds of students at Sanayi-i Nefise Mekteb-i Alisi (the Academy of Fine Arts), Konduktor Mekteb-i Alisi (the Conductor School) and Muhendis Mekteb-i Alis (the Academy of Engineering).

They were the years when the school of civil engineering was founded and developed as part of the Muhendishane-i Berri-i Humayun (the Military School of Engineering). At the stage when the curriculum of the school was being developed Kemaleddin Bey was running a large number of different courses. It was an open field ranging from Technology and Architecture to Pen and Ink and Shadow Drawing and from Calligraphy to Iron Works. But what is certain is that he transmitted his enthusiasm to the students.

When he was appointed to the Evkaf Nezareti, he took his students to the Building and Reparation Technological Assembly to meet the anticipated demand for intensive and fast production. This permanent staff composed of the talented architects and engineers he had chosen was to turn into a school and its office was to become a production centre, as it were, of the design concept given the name of national architecture.

But that was not all.

It was Kemaleddin Bey who pioneered the founding of the Ottoman Society of Architects and Engineers, and who personally penned the call to the meetings of the Foundation through the Tanin newspaper.

His final role was membership, and subsequently the presidency, of the Council of Fine Arts founded by the Ministry of Education in 1926.

== Thinking and writing ==
The writing of Turkish architecture and the history of architecture is a field that developed later. Even today it does not appear to have reached a significant level of acclaim. Kemaleddin Bey is an pioneer on this subject. His thoughts on living and professional models are unique. On the one hand there is his identity as an architect and professional experience in that he designed many buildings, most of which he built; on the other hand there is the duty that is obligatory for the teaching profession of transferring information and experience within specific systematics; a writing function arising from the synergy of this dichotomy and a realisation of the need for questioning, evaluation and historical contextualisation. When research and thought of the genetic codes of a work and profession are perceived as a mission, the first or earliest written account of our history of architecture has begun.

== 1870–1891 ==
The availability of information and documentation of the first years of Kemaleddin's life is very limited. All that is known is that he started at the Ibrahim Aga primary school near his home in 1875 and that he learned French and Arabic at the special school, to which his father was appointed, opened for children of army officers in Crete in 1881.

When he returned to İstanbul he continued his education at the Numune-i Terakki school, which provided a model education. He graduated from this school, where the most well known teachers of the era gave lessons such as the mathematician Mehmed Nadir or the astronomer Huseyin Efendi. In 1887, he was accepted into the second class of the Hendese-i Mulkiye. He was awarded the Medal for Industry while he was still a student and graduated in 1891.

== 1891–1909 ==
Structural engineering and architecture are taught together at the historical Muhendishane (Hendese-i Mulkiye) in Halıcıoğlu, which Kemaleddin starts attending in the second class. Kemaleddin shows more interest in Prof. Jasmund's architecture classes than in engineering classes. Nevertheless, his training as an engineer makes itself felt in all his designs.

== 1909–1919 ==
On 18 May 1909, he was appointed head of architecture at the Imperial Ministry of Foundations (or, the General Directorate of Foundations, as it is now known). The years of this period of office, 1909–1919, were the most productive era for Kemaleddin Bey from the perspective of architectural design and applications.

As well as running maintenance and repair works on historical structures, the traditional role of the ministry, he also designed and built new construction projects.

The restoration works that made it possible to become acquainted with and examine Ottoman architecture directly and in a concrete manner were his field of reference for new building designs. He took the information source of trials that distinguish the language of architecture experimentation from these works and applied it. His restoration works are the least well known and least documented of Kemaleddin Bey's works. We can find out about the restoration of the Yeni Cami Hunkar imperial gathering place from written documents, and the restoration of Fatih Mosque and its rest house and Nuruosmaniye Mosque from the drawings in the archive of the General Directorate of Foundations.

== Career ==
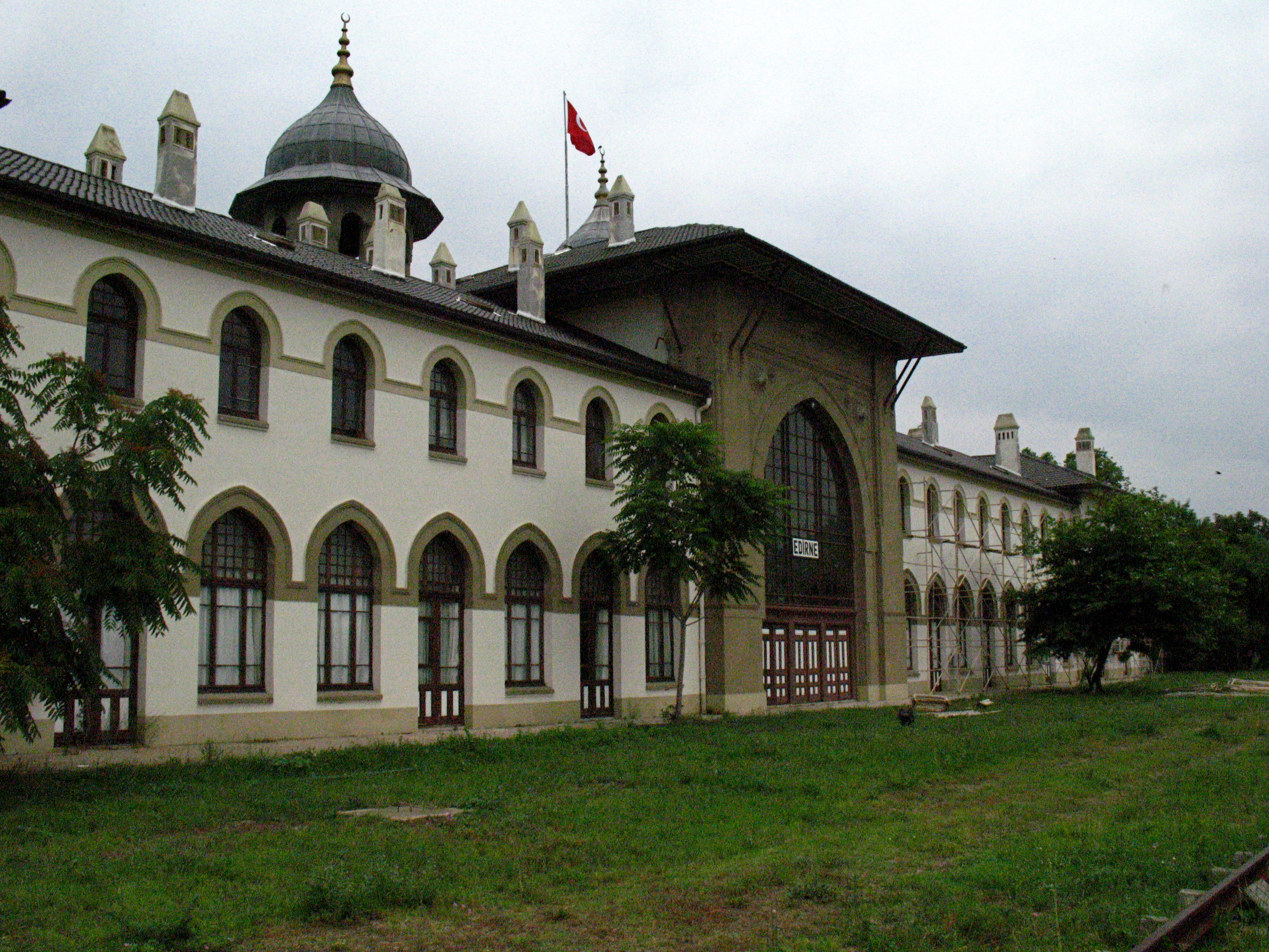
Edirne Karaağaç Tren İstasyonu (Karaağaç Railroad Station in Edirne) designed by Mimar Kemaleddin Bey

After the proclamation of the Second Constitutional Monarchy in 1908, Ahmet Kemaleddin Bey was appointed director of the Construction and Restoration Department at the Ministry of Foundations (Ottoman Turkish: Evkaf Nezareti).

He designed four railway stations for the Oriental Railway Company. For his successful work at the construction of Plovdiv Central railway station, he was tasked with the design of railway stations of Thessaloniki and Edirne. At the railway station of Thessaloniki, only the foundations were completed. The railway station of Edirne could be completed in 1914.

In 1908, he built a girls' high school in Edirne, which went 1910 in education. He was invited by the Grand Mufti of Jerusalem to carry out restoration work on the Al-Aqsa Mosque. He accepted the invitation and went to Jerusalem, which had come under British Mandate from Ottoman Empire after World War I. He stayed there a while. For his successful restoration work, Mimar Kemaleddin Bey was awarded with honorific membership by the Royal Institute of British Architects (RIBA). After returning home, he focused his works on buildings in Ankara, the new capital of the Republic.

As one of the pioneers of the First Turkish National Architectural Movement, Mimar Kemaleddin Bey was inspired by the Ottoman classical architecture, and tried to create a new style by combining the distinct features of German and Ottoman architecture. He rendered the characteristics of Ottoman and Islamic structures so that they reflect the Turkish national identity. He put arches, copings and tiles on the facade of his buildings in foreground, emphasized symmetry and highlighted conventional style with turrets and cornices.

== Death ==
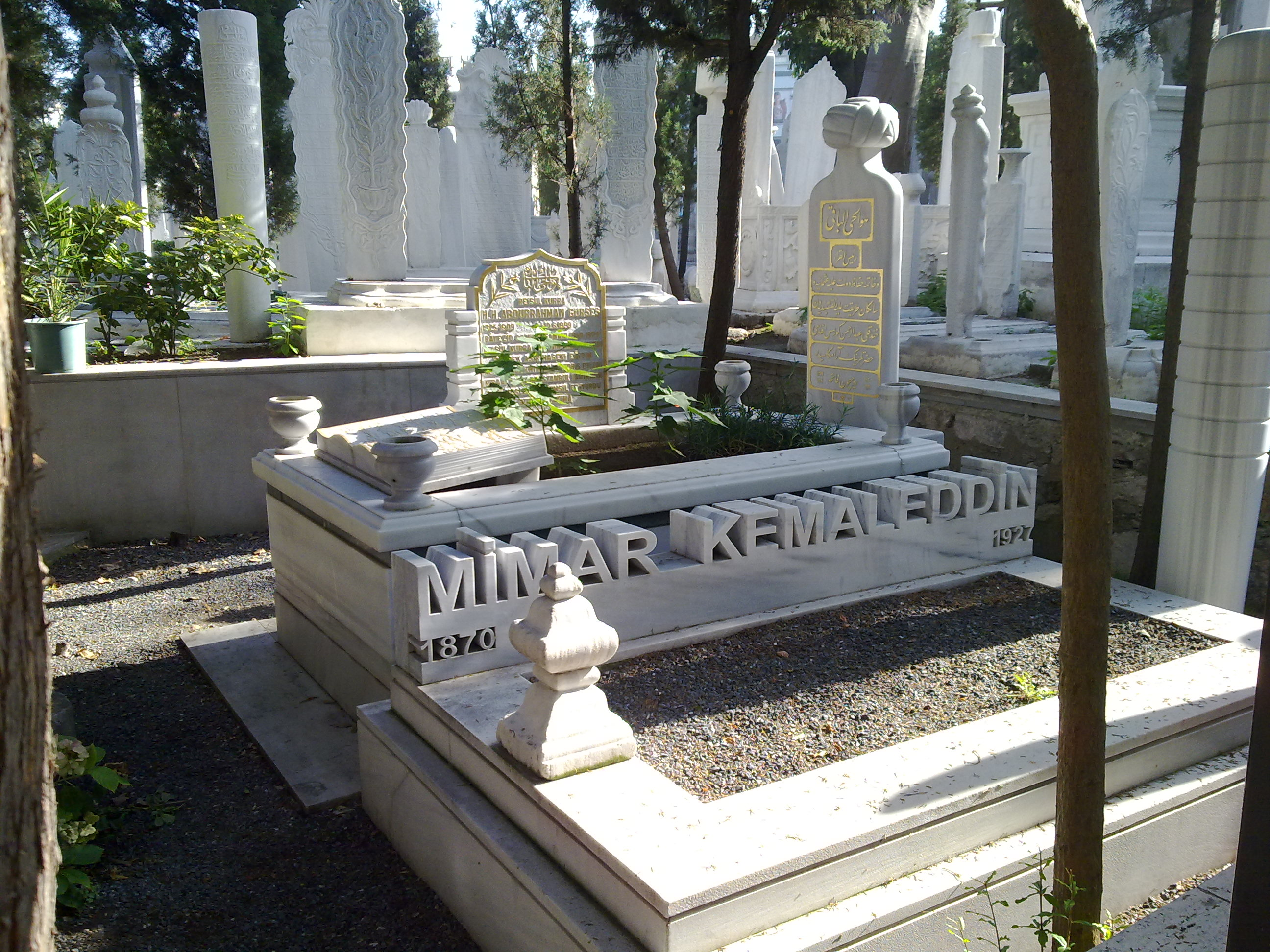
Grave of Mimar Kemaleddin Bey at the cemetery of the Bayezid II Mosque in Istanbul

Ahmet Kemaleddin died on 13 July 1927, in Ankara at the building site of Ankara Palas as a result of a cerebral hemorrhage, at the age of 57. He was survived by his wife Sabiha and son İlhan Mimaroğlu, who became a renowned composer. His corpse was transferred to Istanbul, and was laid to rest at the Karacaahmet Cemetery. Some years later, without the knowledge of his family his grave was moved to the graveyard of Bayezid II Mosque, due to the construction of a road between Kadıköy and Üsküdar, which went through the cemetery on the spot of his grave. Reburied at the new site without a headstone, his grave was discovered in the 1990s. In 2007, his burial place was restored.

== Notable works ==
He designed among others the Tayyare Apartments, built between 1919 and 1922 in Istanbul, which were redeveloped in 1985 into luxury hotel premises. His another work Istanbul 4th Vakıf Han was converted into a five-star World Park Hotel.

Notable works of him include:

- Eyüp Anadolu High School, Istanbul
- Çapa Anadolu Teachers' High School, Istanbul
- Şemsi Pasha Primary School
- Çamlıca Girls' High School
- Bostancı Mosque, Istanbul
- Yeşilköy Mosque, Istanbul
- Reşadiye School (today's Eyüp Middle School), Istanbul
- Tomb of Sultan Reshad
- Tomb of Gazi Osman Pasha
- Tomb of Mahmud Shevket Pasha

The tomb made for Mahmut Şevket Pasha, one of the last Ottoman grand viziers, and his aide Ibrahim Halıl Bey and his footman Kazım Efendi is in the Hurriyet-i Ebediye War Cemetery to commemorate those who lost their lives in the events of 31 March 1909. Mahmut Sevket Pasha, known to the people as the freedom Hero for suppressing the uprising in Istanbul as commander of the 3rd Army in the 31 March events, was killed by counter revolutionaries on 14 June 1913.

The design of the tomb has a completely new composition distinguishing it from other tombs by Kemaleddin Bey. The tomb consists of a canopy like section that is square plan, accessed on three sides by steps, covered with a double walled dome, and open on three sides, and an adjacent semi octagonal plan structure covered with a semidomed exedra.

- Tomb of Ali Rıza Pasha
- Tomb of Hüsnü Pasha
- Restoration of Fethiye Mosque and Sinan Pasha Madrasa
- Bandırma Haydar Çavuş Mosque
- Tomb of Ahmed Cevad Pasha, Istanbul (1901)
- Plovdiv Central Station (1908)
- Kamer Hatun Mosque, Beyoğlu, Istanbul (1911)
- Bebek Mosque, Istanbul (1913)
- Library of Istanbul University's Faculty of Letters (1913)
- Restoration of Edirne Railway Station (1914)
- Istanbul 1st Vakıf Han (1918)
- Tayyare Apartments, Istanbul (1922)
- Projecting of restoration work for Al-Aqsa Mosque, Jerusalem (1925)
- Istanbul 4th Vakıf Han (1926)
- Ankara 2nd Vakıf Han (Ankara Evkaf Apartment) died during its construction (1927)

=== Completion of Ankara Palas ===
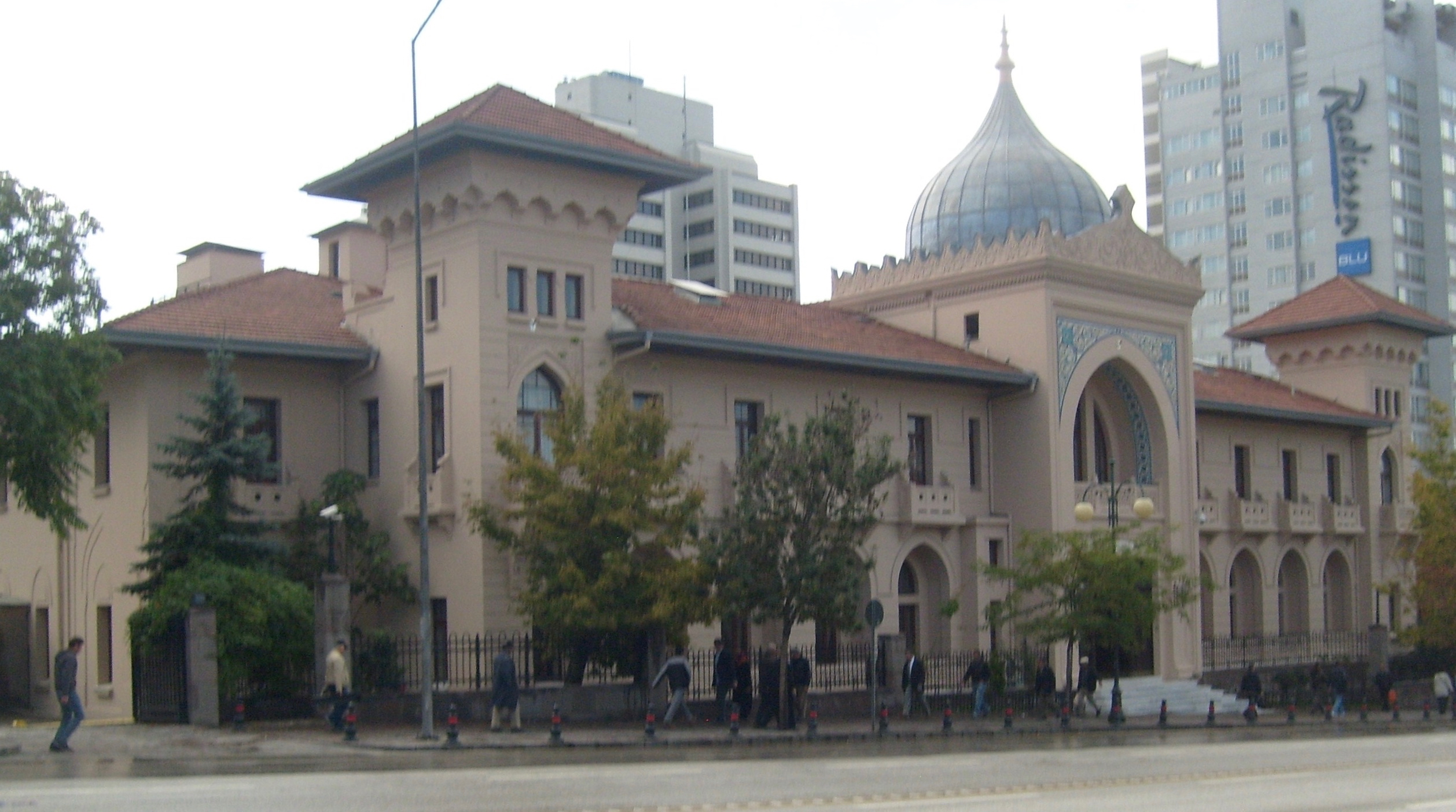
Ankara Palas Hotel demonstrates characteristics of the First Turkish national architectural movement.

Completion of Ankara Palas, a project started by Vedat Tek, was Kemaleddin Bey's first design project after arriving in Ankara. The hotel was designed in 1924 by Architect Vedad Bey, but when he left the project the hotel was built according to Kemaleddin Bey's new design and opened for business in the autumn of 1927.

The hotel was the setting for Ankara's important political and social meetings, particularly during the early years of the Republic, and was a venue for welcoming all the important guests of the state.

The large balcony with pointed arches on the axially planned rectangular mass' axis, the raised mass and its domed entrance emphasize its orientalist appearance and monumental aspect. There is an ornate ballroom receiving daylight from above.

The limitation of traditional decoration to balcony parapets and console stones balances the Orientalist emphasis.

=== Main building of Turkish State Railways ===
The main building of Turkish State Railways in Ankara was Kemaleddin Bey's last design. The foundations of the building were made a month after the architect's death and construction was completed in 1928. These multi storey residences that were actually designed for railway employees were used temporarily and then permanently by the administration.

According to available documents the building that is identified together with the 19th May Square in front of Ankara Station and the station itself was designed as an apartment built around a spacious inner courtyard. However, only one third of the section in the station direction was completed. In spite of the projections made on each axis for axial emphasis, the central corridor plan and texture of the facade with flat square windows is austere. The decorative ironwork of the high gate opening into the courtyard and the large rosace patterned ironwork in the half circle arch above it is incomparable.

=== Gazi Institute of Education, Ankara ===
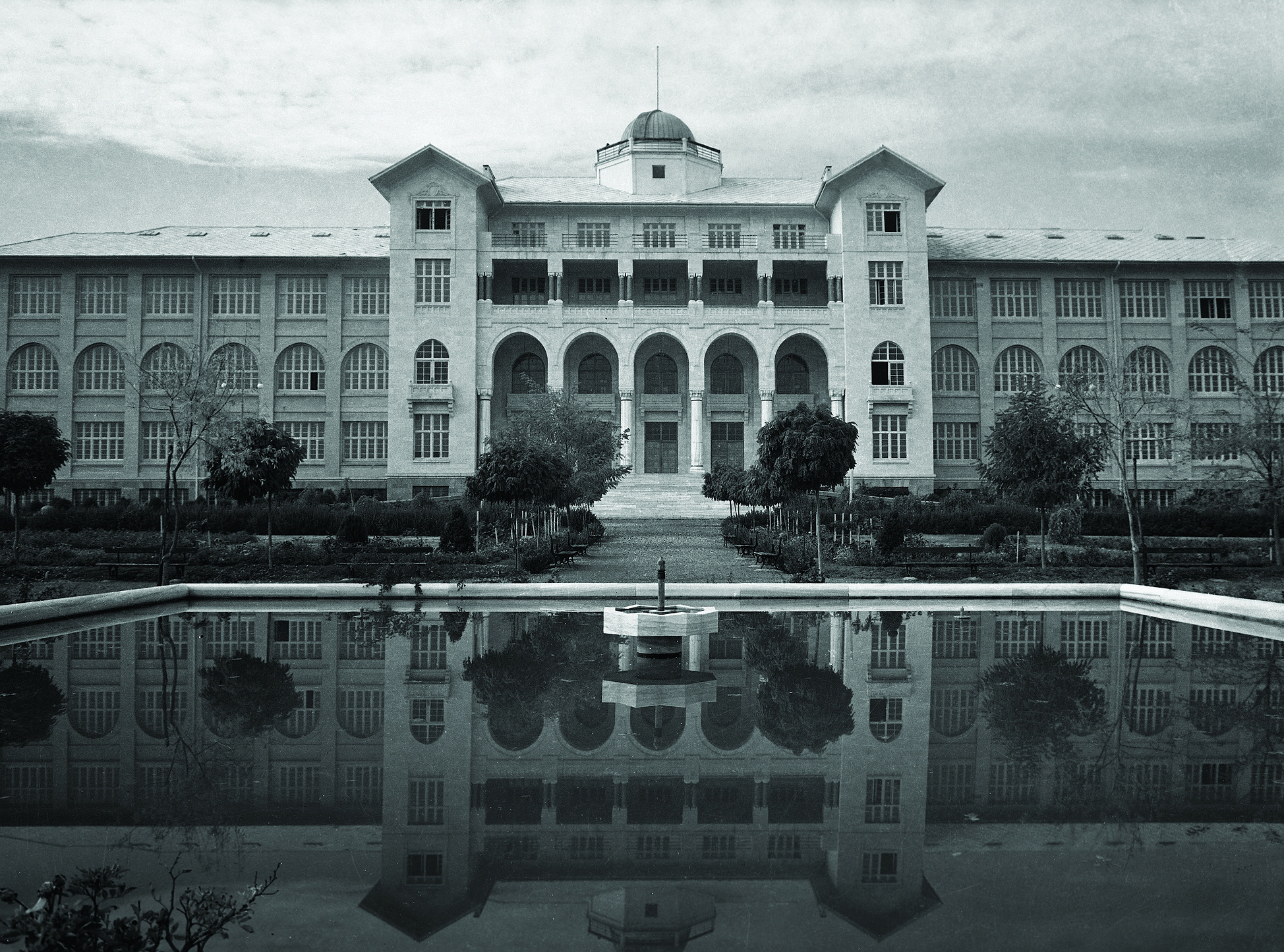
Gazi Institute of Education in Ankara

The building of Gazi Institute of Education (Turkish: Gazi Eğitim Enstitüsü) is one of Kemaleddin Bey's last works. Its design was completed in 1927 and its construction in 1930; the same year in which the school began its educational programme.

The building consists of four storeys including the basement and occupies a large rectangular area. Two inner courtyards symmetrically aligned with the entrance axis are surrounded with a corridor system in the axial plan. The midsection on the axis is five storeys high with a sixth floor over the entrance used as an observatorium.

The entrance porch accessed by wide steps is indicated with colossal columns and high arches. On the upper veranda a distinctive balance and decorative accent pattern is achieved with the lintels of pairs of flat arched dwarf.

The classicist fiction of the 'losenge' patterned colonnades in the entrances allow the magnificence of the building to be sensed on a human scale.

== Honours ==
- A street across Sirkeci Railway Terminal and crossing Hamidiye Cad., on which his masterpiece Istanbul 4th Vakıf Han is situated, is named in his honour.
- In 2009, a new series of Turkish lira banknotes went into circulation. The reverse side of the 20-lira banknote depicts Mimar Kemaleddin, together with one of his major works, the rectorate building of Gazi University in Ankara.

== Bibliography ==
- Yavuz, Yıldırım (1981). Mimar Kemalettin ve birinci ulusal mimarlık dönemi (in Turkish). ODTÜ Mimarlık Fakültesi Basım İşliği.
- Yavuz, Yıldırım (2009). Mimar A. Kemalettin: İmparatorluk'tan cumhuriyet'e : (1870-1927) (in Turkish). TMMOB Mimarlar Odası. ISBN 9789944897303.
- Cengizkan, N. Müge (2009). Ali Cengizkan (ed.). Mimar Kemalettin ve çağı: mimarlık, toplumsal yaşam, politika (in Turkish). TMMOB Mimarlar Odası. ISBN 9789944897310.
- Cephanecigil, Gül; Meryem Fındıklıgil Doğuoğlu, Aras Neftçi (2009). Afife Batur (ed.). Mimar Kemaleddin: Proje kataloğu (in Turkish). TMMOB Mimarlar Odası. ISBN 9789944897327.

== Gallery ==
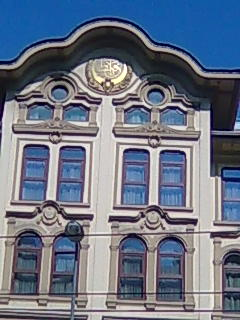
Facade detail of Tayyare Apartments

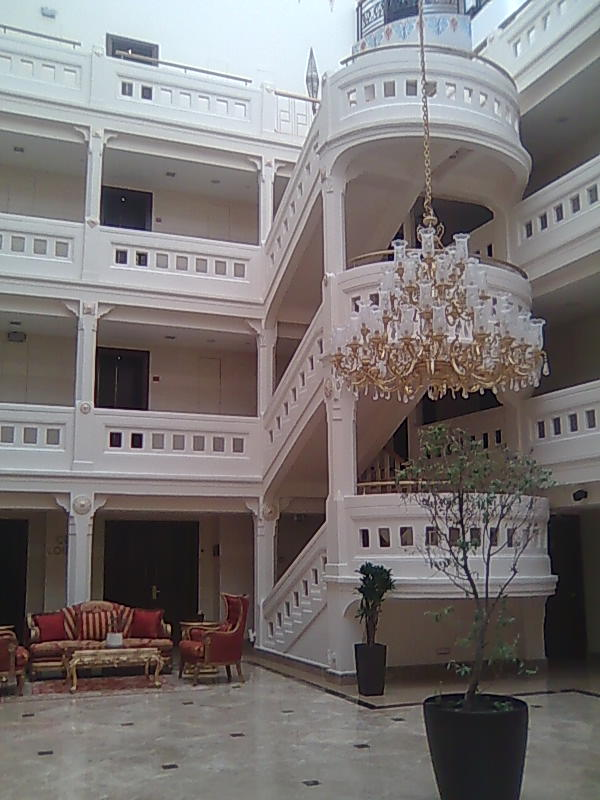
Inside staircase and balconies of Tayyare Apartments

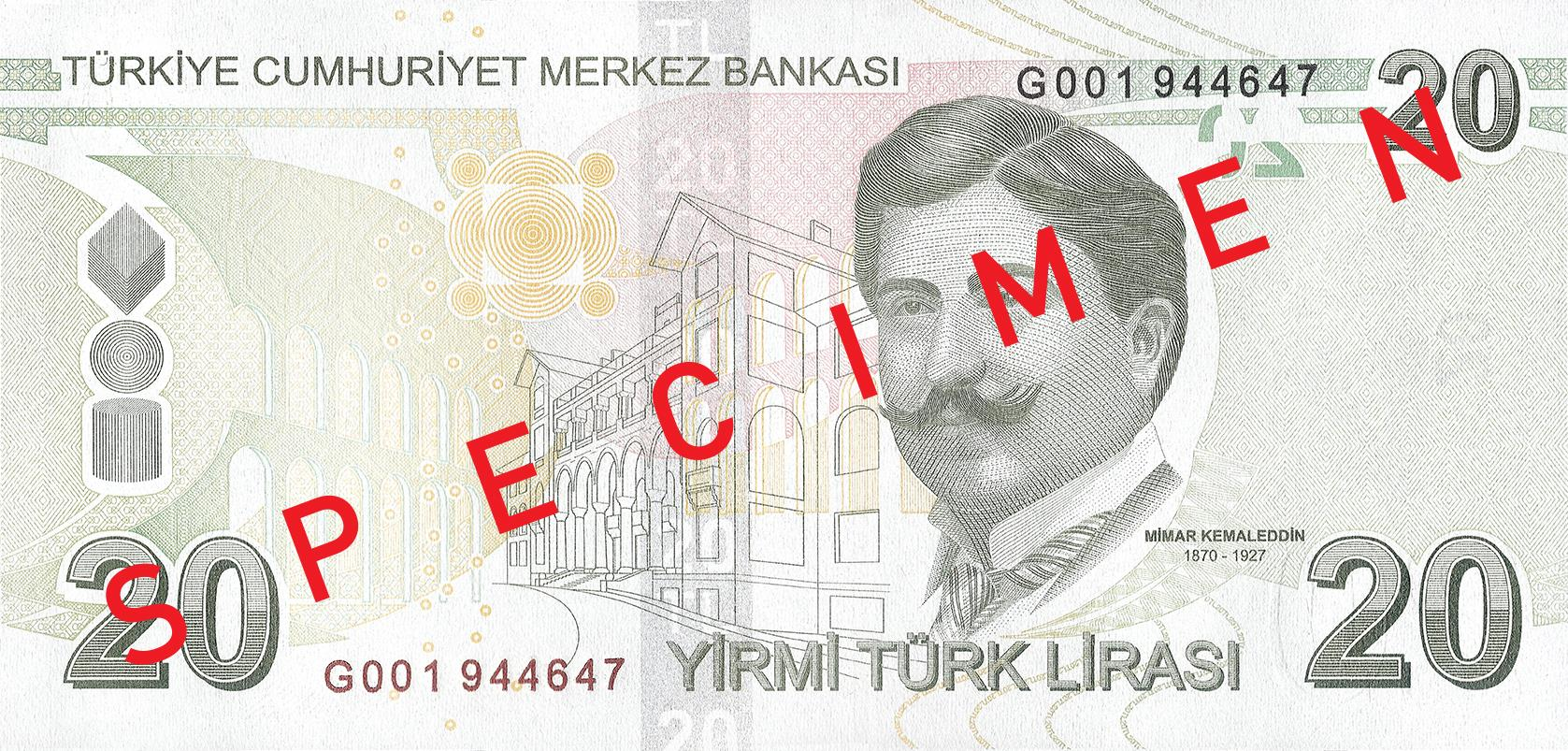
His portrait and the main building of Gazi University on the 20-Turkish lira banknote

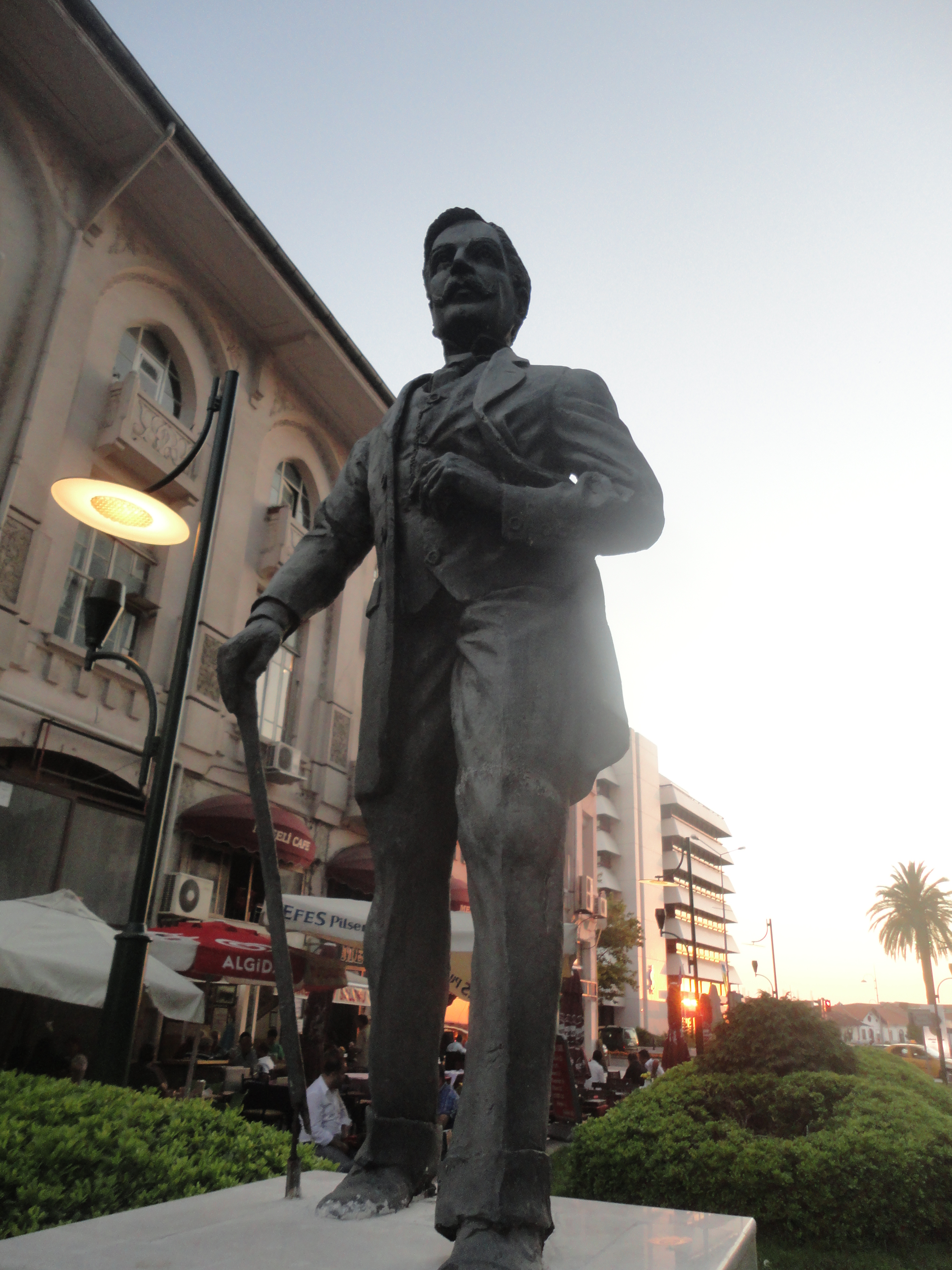
Statue of Mimar Kemaleddin in İzmir

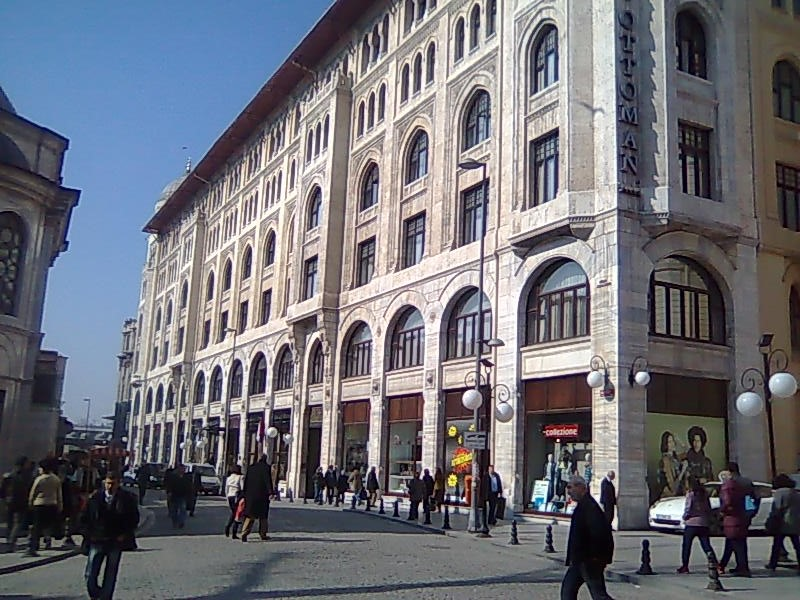
Facade of the building in the west, south and east direction are covered by cut stone and marble Istanbul 4th Vakıf Han
