= Crowne Plaza Istanbul Old City =

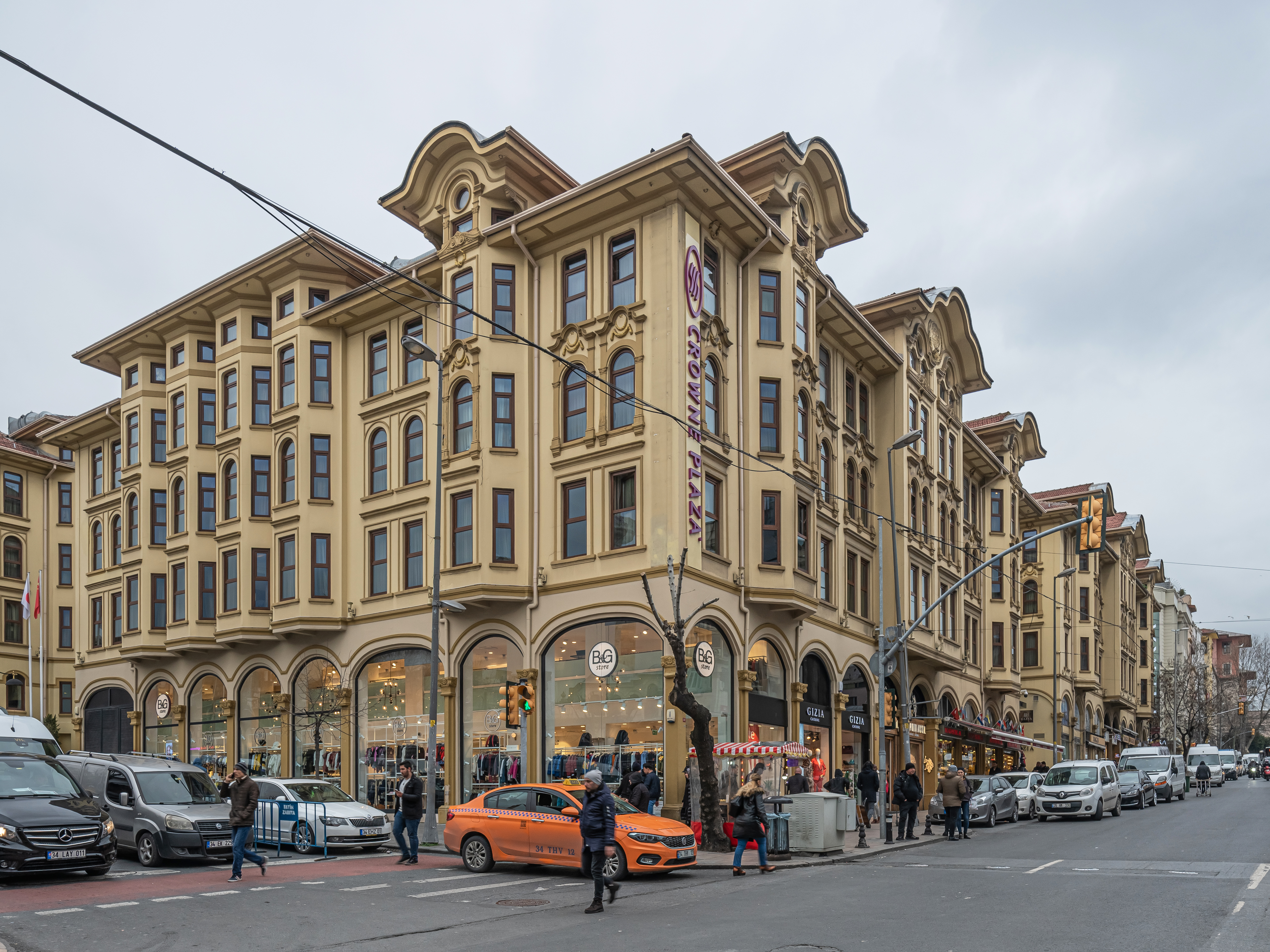
- Tayyare Apartments as Crowne Plaza Hotel Istanbul Old City today

- Location within Istanbul
- Hotel chain: Crowne Plaza Hotels & Resorts

General information
- Architectural style: Turkish Neoclassical
- Location: Istanbul, Turkey, Ordu Cad. 226; 34470 Laleli, Istanbul
- Coordinates: 41°00′35″N 28°57′28″E
- Owner: Turkish Aeronautical Association (THK)

Height
- Height: 22.91 m (75.2 ft)

Technical details
- Floor area: 25,000 m^{2} (270,000 sq ft)

Design and construction
- Architect: Ahmet Kemaleddin

Other information
- Number of rooms: 265
- Number of restaurants: 2

Website
- www.cpoldcity.com/index_en.html

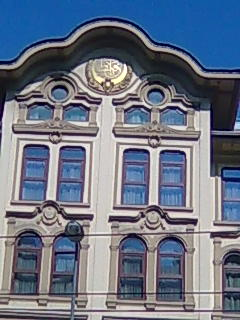
Facade detail

Crowne Plaza Istanbul Old City historically known as The Tayyare Apartments (initially Ottoman Turkish: Harikzedegân Apartmanları or later Turkish: Tayyare Apartmanları) are a complex of four buildings designed by Turkish architect Mimar Kemaleddin, completed in 1922 and located in the old city of Istanbul, Turkey. The apartments were originally built as public housing for the victims of a great fire, converted later into hotel premises. Formerly Ramada Hotel and then Merit Antique Hotel, the complex is currently a five star hotel of the Crowne Plaza Hotels & Resorts chain named Crowne Plaza Istanbul Old City.

== History ==
=== Tayyare Apartments ===
In 1918, a great fire destroyed numerous buildings in wide areas at the old city of Istanbul, mainly in neighborhoods of Cibali, Altımermer and Fatih. Plans were made to construct residential buildings at least for a part of low-income fire victims, who had lost their houses. Renowned Turkish architect Kemaleddin Bey (1870-1927) was commissioned with the task to develop apartments in Laleli quarter.

Ottoman Ministry of Foundations donated the empty ground of Koska Madrasa, which belonged to Laleli Mosque's Complex, and was partly destroyed by the 1894 Istanbul earthquake and then burnt down in 1911. The construction, financed by voluntary donations from residents of Istanbul, began in 1919 and was completed in 1922. Styled in Turkish neoclassical architecture, the low-rise structure consists of a ground floor, a mezzanine and two floors topped with a roof floor reaching a total height of 22.91 m (75.2 ft). The complex consists of four symmetrical, equal-sized, quadratic buildings separated by atriums, all forming a block. Tayyare Apartments were the first modern buildings constructed in reinforced concrete, and the first public housing project within the walled old city of Istanbul. There were a total of 124 apartments with three or five rooms and covered terrace, 25 shops and in addition a laundrette for common use, as well as coal bunkers for each apartment. The building complex was called initially "Harikzedegân Apartmanları", meaning "Apartments for Fire Victims". The completion of the complex coincided with the ending of the Ottoman Empire, and the designated lodgers could not move in. After the apartments were transferred to the Turkish Aeronautical Association (formerly Turkish: Türk Tayyare Cemiyeti, now Turkish: Türk Hava Kurumu, THK) in the newly founded Republic, they were renamed "Tayyare Apartmanları" meaning "Aircraft Apartments". The apartments were used for residential purposes only until 1985.

Tayyare Apartments are situated between Beyazıt Square and Aksaray in Ordu Cad. (Ordu Caddesi) next to the 18th-century Laleli Mosque.

=== Redevelopment as hotel ===
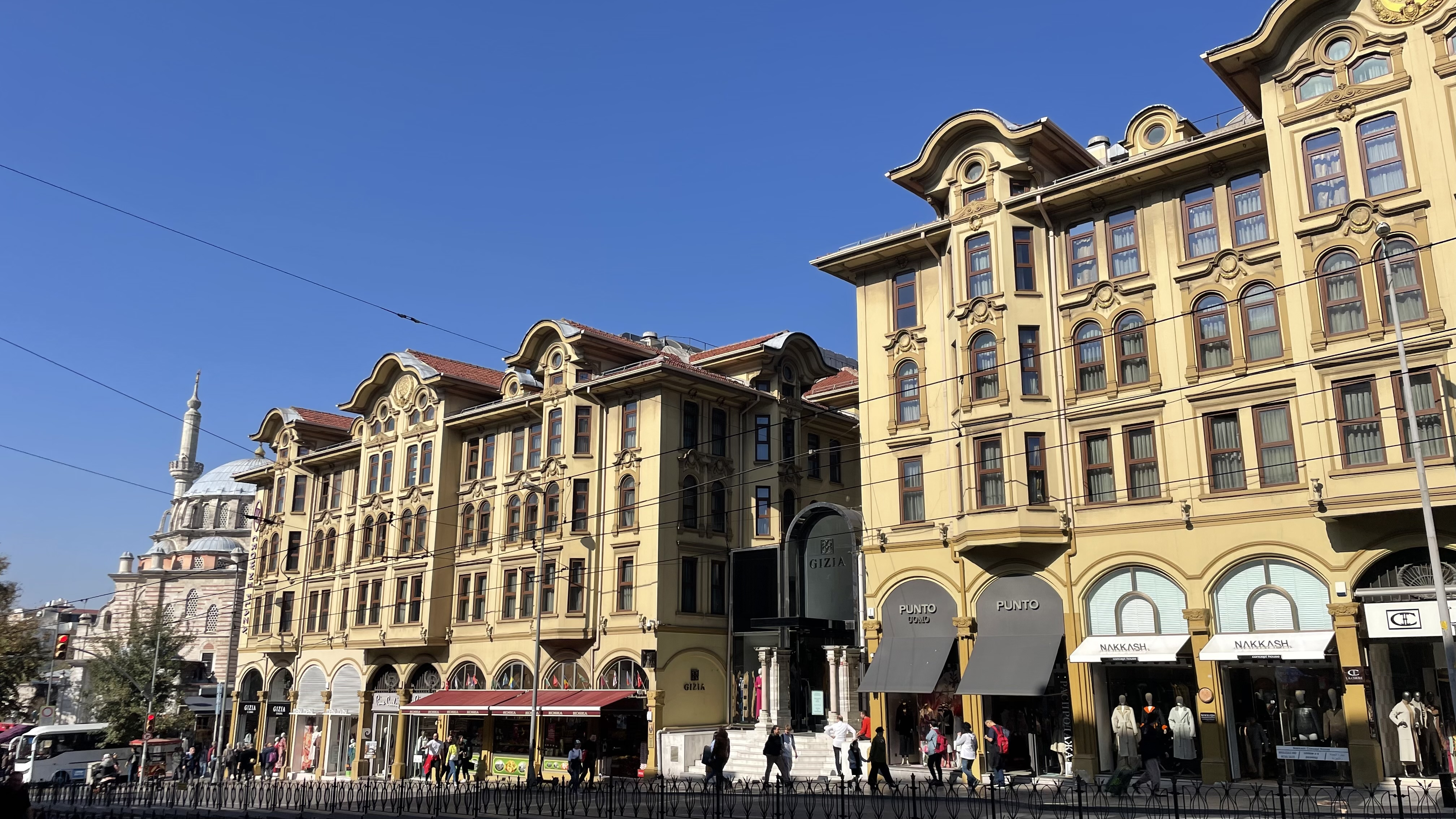
Tayyare Apartments from the tramway side

In 1985, the historical complex was leased to Göksel Marine company for a term of twenty years to be converted into a three-star hotel. However, the lessee could not afford the financial resources needed, and formed a partnership with the tourism company Net Holding. After spending US$27 million, Net Holding redeveloped Tayyare Apartments transforming them into a five-star hotel. The project was led by architect Erdem Ertunga. The company operated the premises in the beginning under the name "Ramada Hotel" and later as "Merit Antique Hotel".

In November 2000, Net Holding purchased the shares of Göksel Marine and became the sole operator. Due to financial problems with Net Holding, however, the THK revoked the lease in 2003, four years before the legal termination of the contract. The THK argued with financial loss due to the payment of the annual lease in Turkish currency that was affected by devaluation under high-inflation in those years. In the beginning, annual lease of ₺400 million were equivalent to US$760,000. However, in 2003 the equivalent value in US dollars were only 30,000, while the lessee was earning at the same time US$800,000 from the sublease of twelve stores under the hotel, claimed the THK. Net Holding was forced to move out in August 2004. In November 2005, the textile company Naz Giyim became the new lessee at an annual payment of US$3 million for a lease period of twenty years.

=== Crowne Plaza Istanbul Old City ===
Naz Textile signed an agreement with Crowne Plaza chain to rebrand the hotel, and began with renovation work. It was planned to open the hotel end 2006. Meanwhile, the company built a new hotel of the Crowne Plaza chain in the historical Sultanahmet quarter, and transferred the leasing rights on the Tayyare Apartments to the company Dorak Tour for €25 million, reportedly.

On May 26, 2008, after standing vacant almost three years long for renovation work, the complex opened its doors in three of the four buildings, rebranded as the five-star Crowne Plaza Hotel Istanbul Old City. Having a total floor area of 25,000 m^{2} (270,000 sq ft), the hotel consists of 265 deluxe rooms, a VIP lounge, executive boardrooms, three meeting rooms, atrium lounges for 70-150 people, two restaurants of Turkish and international cuisine and a health club.

The hotel is situated in walking distance from historical sites like Grand Bazaar, Topkapı Palace, Blue Mosque and many other tourist attractions in the old city. The distance to Taksim Square is 5 km (3.1 mi) and to the Atatürk International Airport 13 km (8.1 mi).

== Image gallery ==
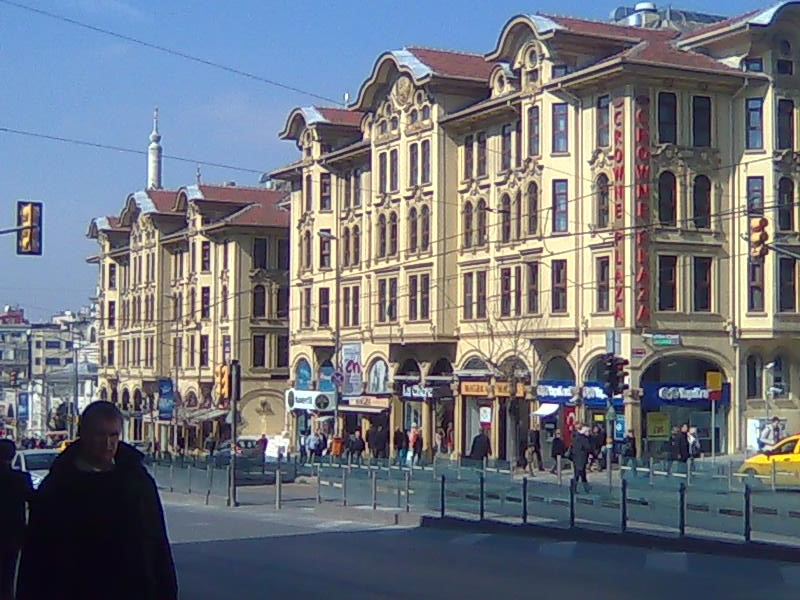
Tayyare Apartments seen from east

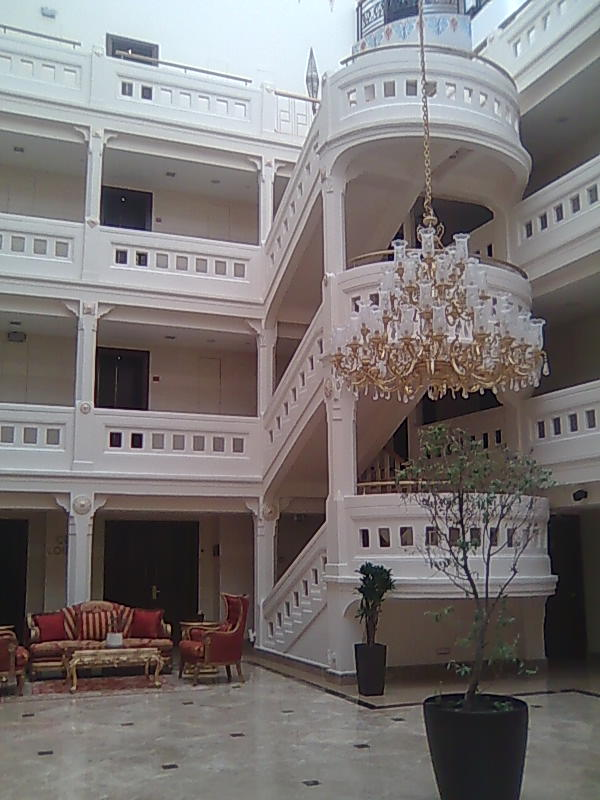
Inside view of staircase and balconies

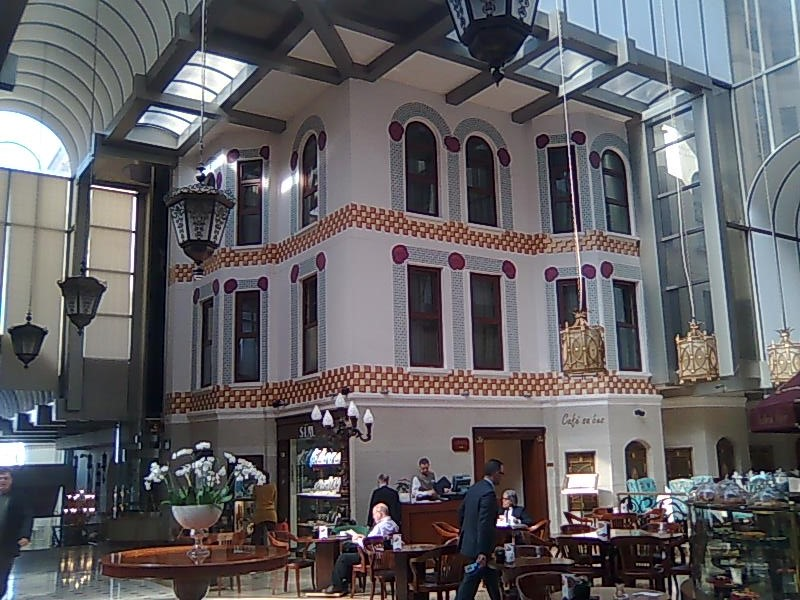
Atrium café of Crowne Plaza Hotel Istanbul Old City (Tayyare Apartments)
