= Ankara Palas =

- Interactive map of the Ankara Palas area

General information
- Architectural style: Turkish Neoclassical
- Location: Ankara, Turkey
- Coordinates: 39.94064°N 32.85229°E
- Construction started: 1924
- Completed: 1928
- Owner: Turkish State

Design and construction
- Architects: Vedat Tek, Kemaleddin Bey

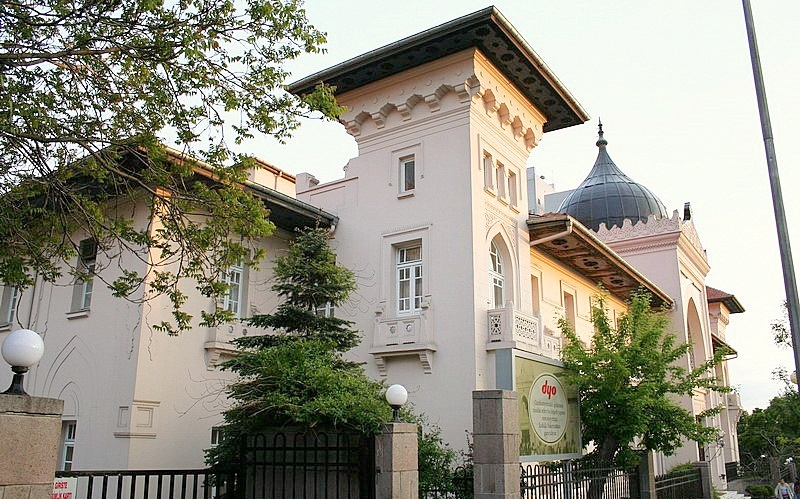
Ankara Palas

Ankara Palas is a historical building, which is used as an official state guest house in the capital Ankara, Turkey. Initially designed as the Ministry of Health building, it was used as a hotel for the members of the Grand National Assembly of Turkey following the completion of its construction in 1928.

The Turkish Neoclassical building was designed in 1924 by architect Vedat Tek (1873–1942). However, since he did not continue with the construction, Mimar Kemaleddin Bey (1870–1927) took over. He died on July 13, 1927, at the building site. The building was completed in 1928.

It is located in Ulus district across the historical building of the first Grand National Assembly (today War of Independence Museum).

The symmetrical two-story, pitched-roof building with a domed central entrance way flanked by twin towers demonstrates characteristics of the First Turkish national architectural movement (Turkish: Birinci Milli Mimari Akımı).

The building was completely restored in 1983 as a 60-room state guesthouse with reception, dining room, banquet hall and tea lounge.
