= Şemsipaşa Primary School =

- Şemsipaşa İlköğretim Okulu
- Şemsipaşa İlkogretim Okulu 34672; Üsküdar, Istanbul, Turkey

Information
- Type: Primary School
- Established: 1758; 268 years ago 1914 (rebuilding)
- Principal: Faik Belen
- Enrollment: 250
- Colors: Red and Dark Blue
- Website: semsipasailkokulu.meb.k12.tr

Şemsipaşa Primary School, founded in 1758, is the oldest primary (elementary) school in Istanbul's Üsküdar district.

== History ==
=== Background (1731–1758) ===
The progenitor of Şemsipaşa Primary School was the Humbaracı Barracks, opened in 1731. While the former premises of the Palace of Ayazma, destroyed the barracks in the reign of Mahmud I opened in the empty plot. 3 years later (in 1734), opens in the Muhendishane-i Humayun. Ayazma Mosque, built in 1758 instead of the Palace of Ayazma. Ayazma Primitive School, built in 1758 instead of the Muhendishane-i Humayun.

=== Founding (1758–1842) ===
Şemsipaşa Primary School, in 1758 by Mustafa III has become primitive school. This school was named first Ayazma Primitive School. Building a two-storey, stone knitting, the outer side was a wooden building. Entrance of the "Ayazma Primitive School was built by Mustafa III Khan, AH 1171" was written.

=== Re-opening (1842–1913) ===
Ayazma Primitive School was closed and replaced immediately by Üsküdar Primary School (Üsküdar İlk Mektebi or Üsküdar Mekteb-i İbtidaiyesi) in the same building. This school continued to exist until 1913. Şeker Ahmed Pasha, graduated from this school.

=== Destruction and rebuilding (1913–present) ===
In 1913, 71 years after its re-opening, the school was destroyed. Mehmed V's chamberlain, Mehmet Tevfik Bey, became the sight of the school where he graduated Mehmed V has requested and the school's construction was begun in 1913. Minister of Awqaf, Ürgüplü Mustafa Hayri Efendi, the famous architect of the period Kemaleddin Bey gave the news and the school's current building was built, by Kemaleddin Bey. The money which was paid by National Defense. Ottoman Turkish writing on the entrance door is the following: "Rebuilt with National Defence money, Ayazma Foundation Primary School, AH 1333 School"

In 1953, principal Akif Güner, bought the ruins of Istanbul Metropolitan Municipality Basmahane and that "porch" emerged at the annex building. In 1975, Üsküdar Secondary School opened in a portion of the school. Moment "Şemsipaşa Primary School" under the name of continuing education and teaching.

== Names of the school ==
Şemsipaşa Primary School's name has changed, as well as the school has been split and re-merged, many times throughout its history. These names are as follows:

- Humbaracı Barracks (1731–1734)
- Muhendishane-i Humayun (1734–1758)
- Ayazma Primitive School (1758–1842)
- Üsküdar Primary School (1842–1913)
- Mustafa III Primary School (1913–1917)
- Ayazma Foundation Primary School (1917–1930)
- Üsküdar 21. School (1930–1949)
- Ayazma Primary School (1949–1953)
- Cumhuriyet Primary School (1953–1975)
- Ayazma Primary School and Üsküdar Secondary School (1975–1992)
- Şemsipaşa Primary School (1992–2012)
- Şemsipaşa Primary School and Şemsipaşa Secondary School (2012–2014)
- Şemsipaşa Primary School (2014–present)

== Administration ==
- Faik Belen (Principal)
- İbrahim Erdem (Vice Principal)

== Notable alumni ==
- Şeker Ahmed Pasha, Ottoman painter
