= Vedat Tek =

Turkish architect (1873–1942)

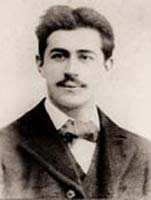
- Born: 1873; Istanbul, Ottoman Empire
- Died: 1942 (aged 68–69); Istanbul, Turkey
- Education: Académie Julian, Paris; École Centrale Paris and Ecole des Beaux Arts, Paris, France
- Occupation: Architect
- Spouse: Firdevs Hanım
- Children: 3
- Buildings: Second Turkish Grand National Assembly Building, Ankara; Istanbul Main Post Office, Sirkeci; Istanbul Land Registry and Cadastre Building, Sultanahmet, Kastamonu Governor's Office

Mehmet Vedat Tek (Ottoman Turkish: محمد وداد, romanized: Mehmed Vedad; 1873 – 1942) was a Turkish architect. The last court architect of the Ottoman Empire, Vedat Tek was one of two leading figures of the First Turkish National Architectural Movement, alongside Mimar Kemaleddin.

== Early life and education ==
Of Cretan Muslim origin, Vedat Tek was born in Istanbul to the governor of Baghdad Province Giritli Sırrı Pasha and composer Leyla Saz as their second son. His older brother was Yusuf Razi Bel (1870–1947), who later became an engineer.

After finishing Galatasaray High School in Istanbul, he was sent to France for higher education. He attended Académie Julian for studies in painting and then studied at the École Centrale Paris, graduating with a degree in civil engineering before he got his further education in architecture at the École des Beaux Arts in Paris. He became the first Turkish architect to receive a Western formal education in architecture.

== Career ==
=== Early work ===
After returning home in 1897, Vedat Tek contributed with his projects to the forming of the First Turkish National Architecture movement (Turkish: Birinci Ulusal Mimarlık) along with Mimar Kemaleddin. He served awhile as the chief architect of the Engineering Corps at the Ministry of War. Later, Sultan Mehmed V appointed him chief court architect.

He also gave lectures at Sanayi-i Nefise Mekteb-i (today's Mimar Sinan Fine Arts University) and Mühendis Mekteb-i Alisi (today's Istanbul Technical University). Vedat Tek was one of the first Turkish lecturers at the Academy of Fine Arts.

=== Architect of the Post and Telegraph Ministry ===
Vedat Tek became popular as an architect because of his project for the Kastamonu Governor's Office (1902). He was appointed architect for the Ministry of Post and Telegraph in 1905. His main assignment was the Istanbul Main Post Office, his largest achievement in his architectural career.

=== Chief architect of the Ottoman Palaces ===
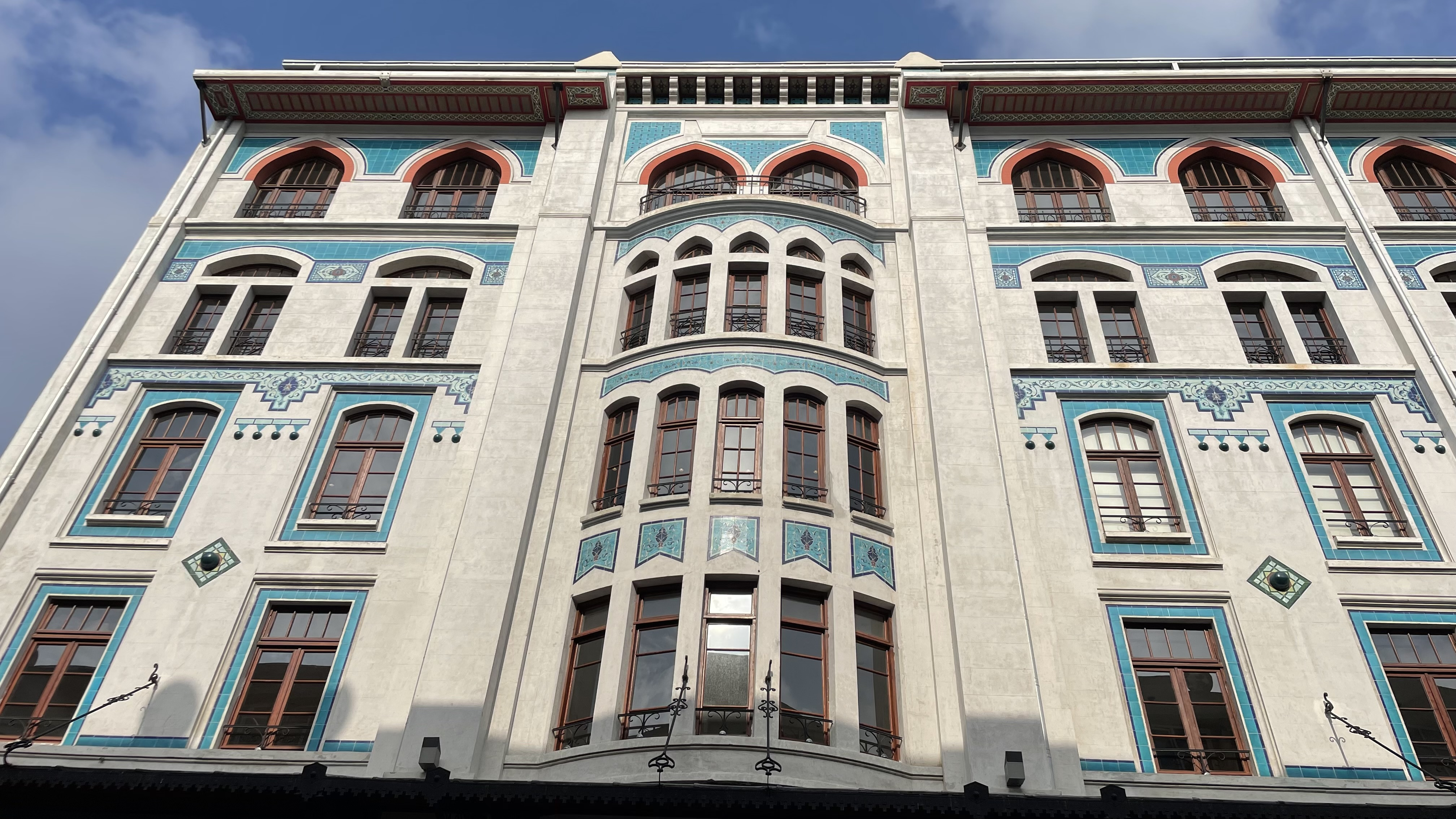
Liman Han in Sirkeci built while he was the Chief architect of the Ottoman Palaces

Vedat Tek became the chief architect of the palaces after Sultan Abdul Hamid II left the throne in 1909 and was succeeded by Mehmed V. As such, he restored about 20 palaces. But when Mehmed VI became sultan, he was dismissed.

=== Republic era ===
After the proclamation of the Republic of Turkey, Vedat Tek was called to Ankara. He built the second building for the Grand National Assembly of Turkey and the Gazi Pavilion there. While he was preparing plans for Ankara Palas, however, the project was taken out of his hands and given to Mimar Kemaleddin.

== Personal life ==
Vedat Tek was married to Firdevs Hanım. From this marriage, they had three daughters.

Vedat Tek died in 1942 and was laid to rest at the Edirnekapı Martyr's Cemetery in Istanbul.

== Projects and buildings ==
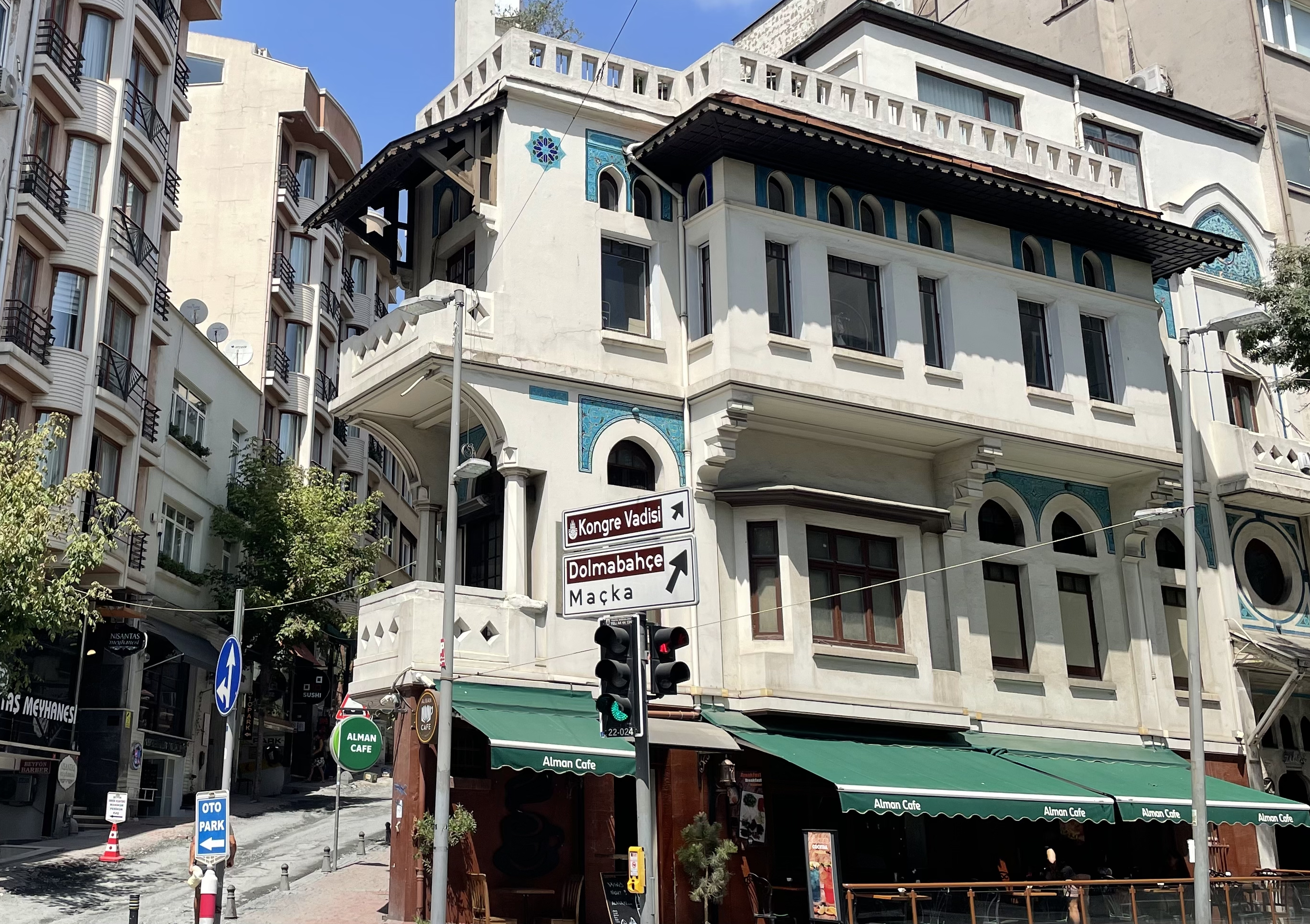
House of Vedat Tek in Nişantaşı, Istanbul.

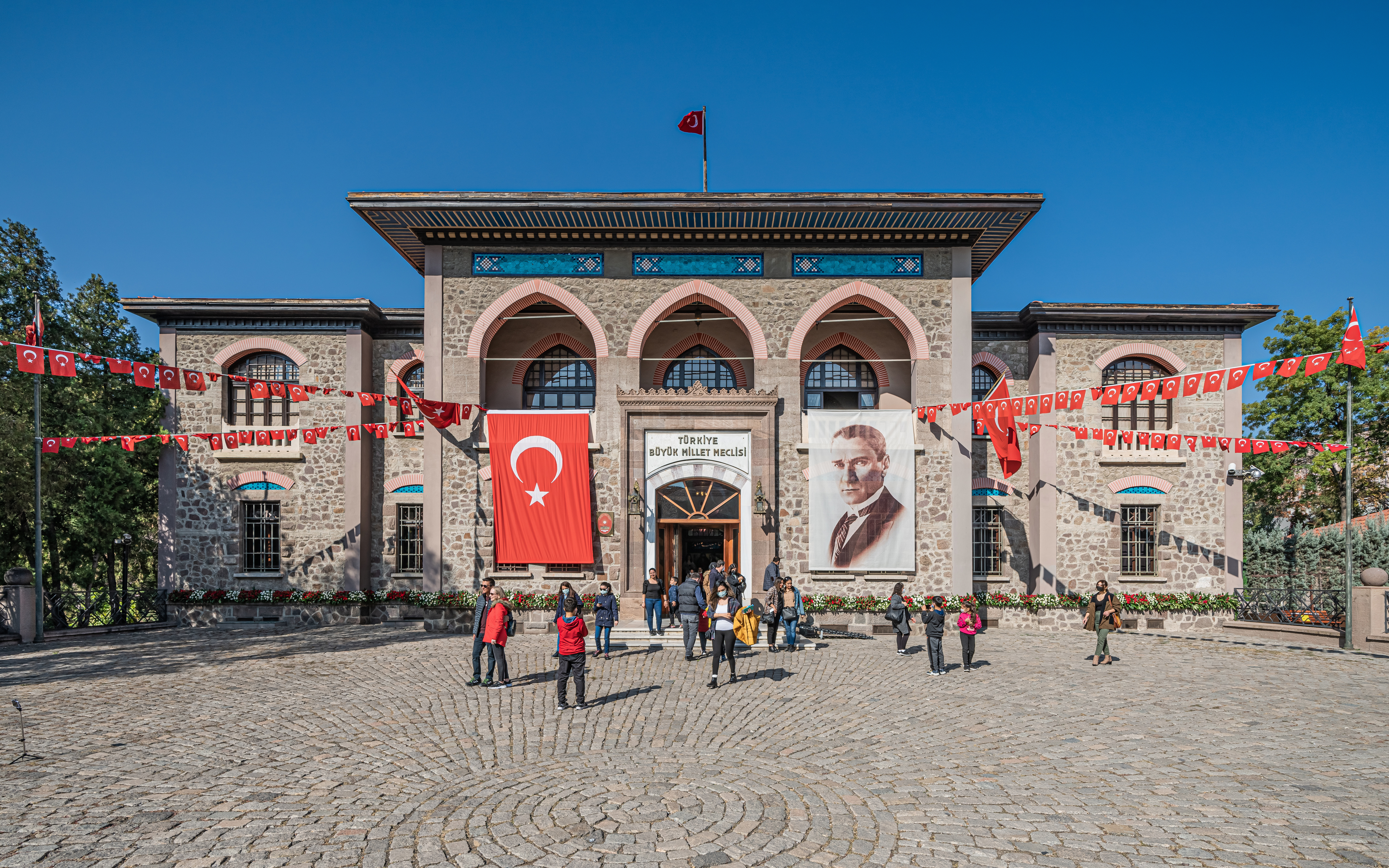
Second Turkish parliament building (Republic Museum today), Ankara. An example of the First National Architecture Movement.

He was the architect of various beautiful buildings in Istanbul; some of his notable projects and buildings including:

- İzmit Clock Tower, İzmit (1901)
- Kastamonu Governor's Office, Kastamonu (1901),
- Liman Han, Sirkeci
- Istanbul Main Post Office, Sirkeci (1905–1909),
- Istanbul Land Registry and Cadastre Building, Sultanahmet (1908),
- House of Vedat Tek, Nişantaşı (1913)
- Aviation Martyrs' Monument, Fatih (1914–1916)
- Haydarpaşa Ferryboat Pier, Haydarpaşa (1915–1917)
- Moda Ferryboat Pier, Moda, Kadıköy (1917) (used since July 1, 2001 as a restaurant),
- Doğancılar Public Park, Üsküdar (1920),
- Çankaya Gazi Mansion, Ankara (1924),
- Second Turkish Grand National Assembly Building, Ankara (1924). (used since October 20, 1980 as the Republic Museum)
- Ankara Palas, Ankara - Designed in 1924 by him as Ministry of Health building, however completed in 1928 by Mimar Kemaleddin Bey as a hotel for the members of the Turkish Grand National Assembly. It is used today as an official state guest house.

The First National Architecture was characterized by the creation of entirely new designs with elements taken off the Seljuk and Ottoman architecture. The buildings all over the country designed in that style had a sweeping overhanging roof, tiled panels on the façade, large arched windows and jutting semi-circular ornaments in common.

Vedat Tek was known for his colorful and ornate style in architecture.

== See also ==
- List of Turkish architects
