= Istanbul 4th Vakıf Han =

Building in Istanbul, Turkey

Legacy Ottoman Hotel
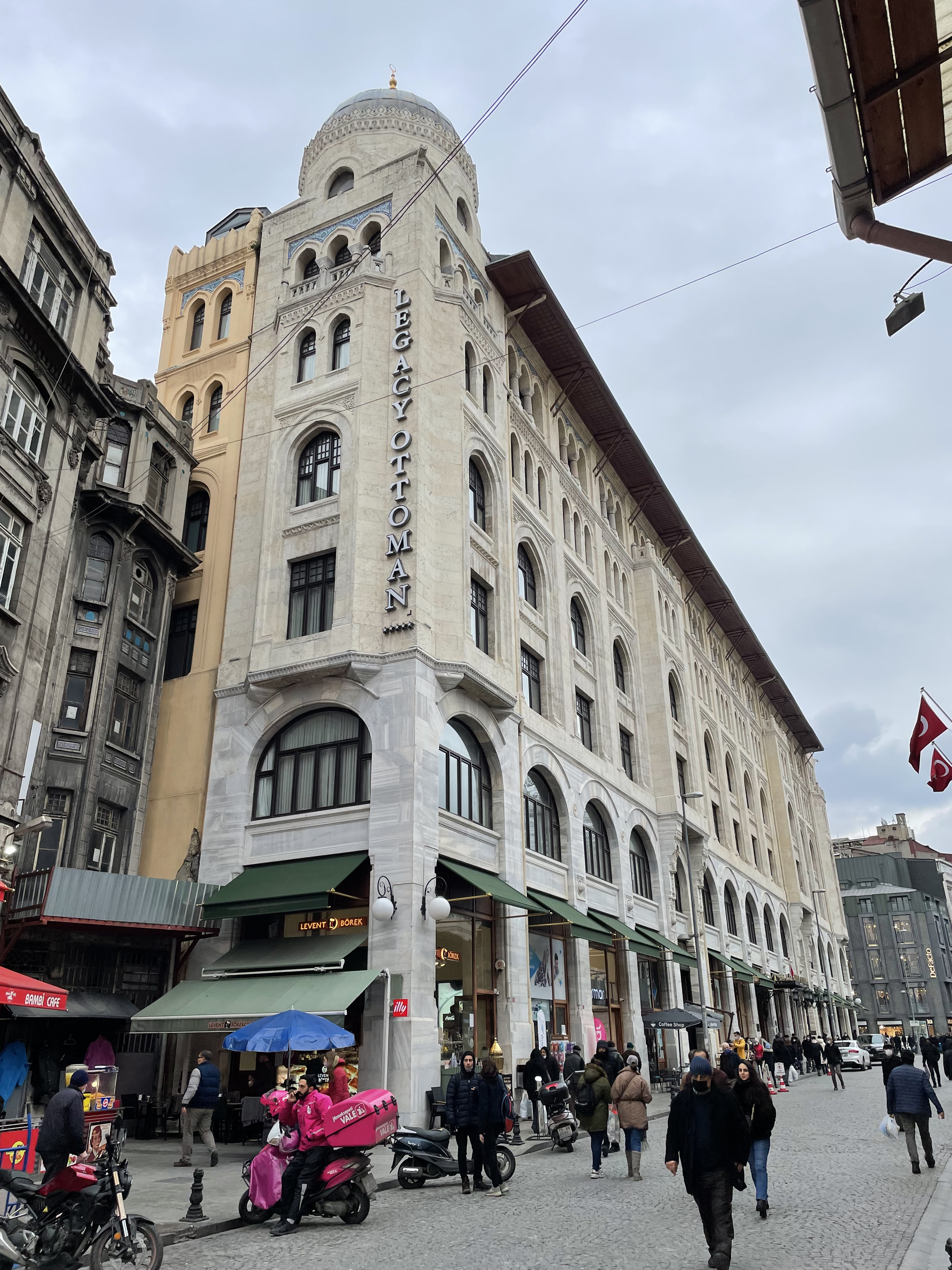
- Istanbul 4th Vakıf Han as Legacy Ottoman Hotel, Turkey

- Location within Istanbul

General information
- Location: Istanbul, Turkey, Hamidiye Cad. 64; 34112 Sirkeci, Eminönü, Istanbul
- Coordinates: 41°00′56″N 28°58′26″E
- Opening: July 2, 2006
- Owner: Foundations Administration (Vakıflar GM)
- Management: Gap-San Eserler

Height
- Height: 27.21 m (89.3 ft)

Technical details
- Floor count: 7 (incl. basement)

Design and construction
- Architect: Mimar Kemaleddin Bey

Other information
- Number of rooms: 153
- Number of suites: 19
- Number of restaurants: 1
- Number of bars: 1

Website
- www.worldparkhotel.com

The Istanbul 4th Vakıf Han is a historical large office building located in the Sirkeci neighbourhood of the Eminönü quarter within the Fatih district of Istanbul, Turkey. It is owned by the Foundations Administration (Turkish: Vakıflar Genel Müdürlüğü). Currently, it is used as a five star hotel of the World Park Hotel chain named Legacy Ottoman.

== History ==
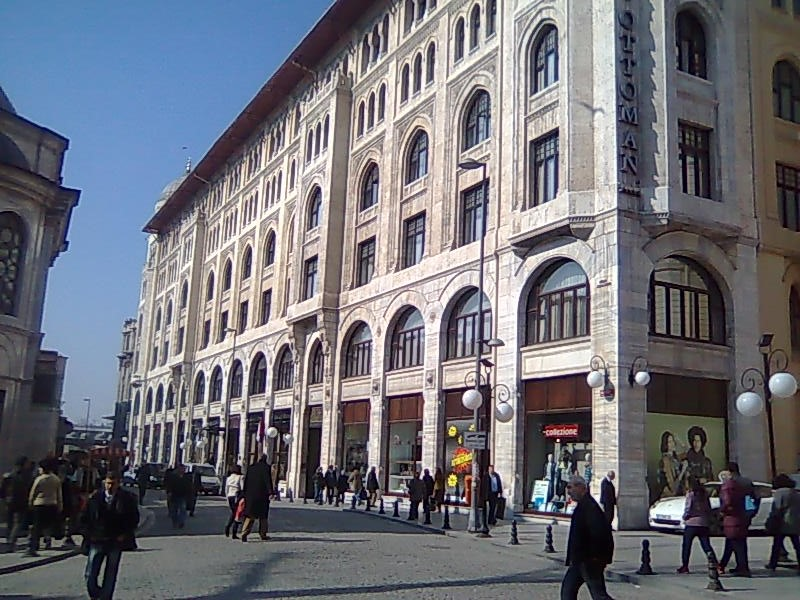
Istanbul 4th Vakıf Han

The building was designed in 1911 by architect Kemaleddin Bey (1870–1927), director of the Construction and Restoration Department at the Ottoman Ministry of Foundations (Ottoman Turkish: Evkaf Nezareti). It is styled in First Turkish National architecture, also called Ottoman Revivalism.

It was constructed between 1916 and 1926 in the place of "Hamidiye Külliyesi", the religious buildings complex which belonged to Sultan Abdul Hamid I (reigned 1774–1789). It was built to meet the high demand for office blocks at the area in the early years of the 20th century. The completion of the construction took many years due to the participation of the Ottoman Empire in the Balkan Wars and World War I.

During the occupation of Istanbul by the Allies following World War I, French troops, which were stationed in the old city zone, used the (at that time incomplete) building from 1920 to 1923 as barracks, calling it Caserne Victor.

In the last decades of the 20th century, the building housed the Istanbul Stock Exchange, as well as the offices of bankers and financiers. In 1995 the Istanbul Stock Exchange moved to its current building in the İstinye neighbourhood, near Maslak business district.

== Architecture ==
The building, constructed with a steel skeleton frame, has seven floors including the basement. It is on the entrance side in Hamidiye Avenue 78.70 m (258.2 ft) long, and rises 27.21 m (89.3 ft) high while its maximum width is 32.43 m (106.4 ft). It has an atrium with the dimensions 35.32 m × 5.20 m (115.9 ft × 17.1 ft). The facades in the west, south and east are covered by cut stone and marble, while the rear facade in the north is covered by stucco applied bricks.

The building, flanked by two turrets, originally had two symmetrically placed entrances in between 24 shops with a mezzanine. The entrances open up to both corners of a U-shaped passage. In the above four floors, there were a total of 148 office rooms of equal size for rent, 37 at each floor. At the end of the passage, two stairways and elevators enable to reach the upper floors. The distance between the two stairways is 30 m (98 ft) with respect to the fire precaution regulation of that time. There exists also a service stairway in the middle of the backside running from the ground floor to the mansard, which was unusual compared to other Ottoman business buildings of that period.

== Redevelopment ==
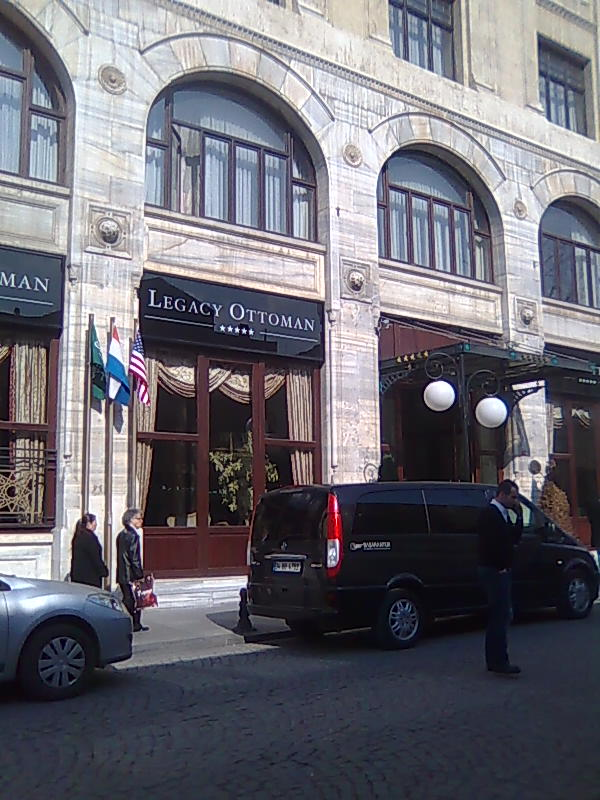
Entrance of the hotel

In 2000, the building was emptied with the intention to be used as a court. After standing vacant for four years, the Istanbul 4th Vakıf Han was leased to the company Gap-San Eserler for a lease term of 25 years and monthly payment of ₺44,000 (approx. US$29,350 as of August 2006) for redevelopment and conversion into a five-star hotel.

The restoration work, which lasted twelve months and cost ₺30 million (approx. US$20 million as of August 2006), was completed in 2006.

After four years of development phase, the annual lease was increased to ₺148,000 (approx. US$94,300 as of 2009), and its value will be updated every four years.

In order to place the hotel entrance with the reception area in a central position, the two original entrances were cancelled and the shop in the middle position was restructured as the main entrance. Beside arranging the mansard roof as a restaurant, no other significant changes were made in the historical building.

== Legacy Ottoman Hotel ==
The Legacy Ottoman Hotel opened on July 2, 2006 as the only five-star hotel in Eminönü. The hotel consists of 153 luxury rooms and 19 suites in total.
