= Bebek Mosque =

Mosque in Istanbul, Turkey

Bebek Mosque (Hümayûn-u Âbad Mosque)
- Bebek Cami (Hümayûn-u Âbad Cami)
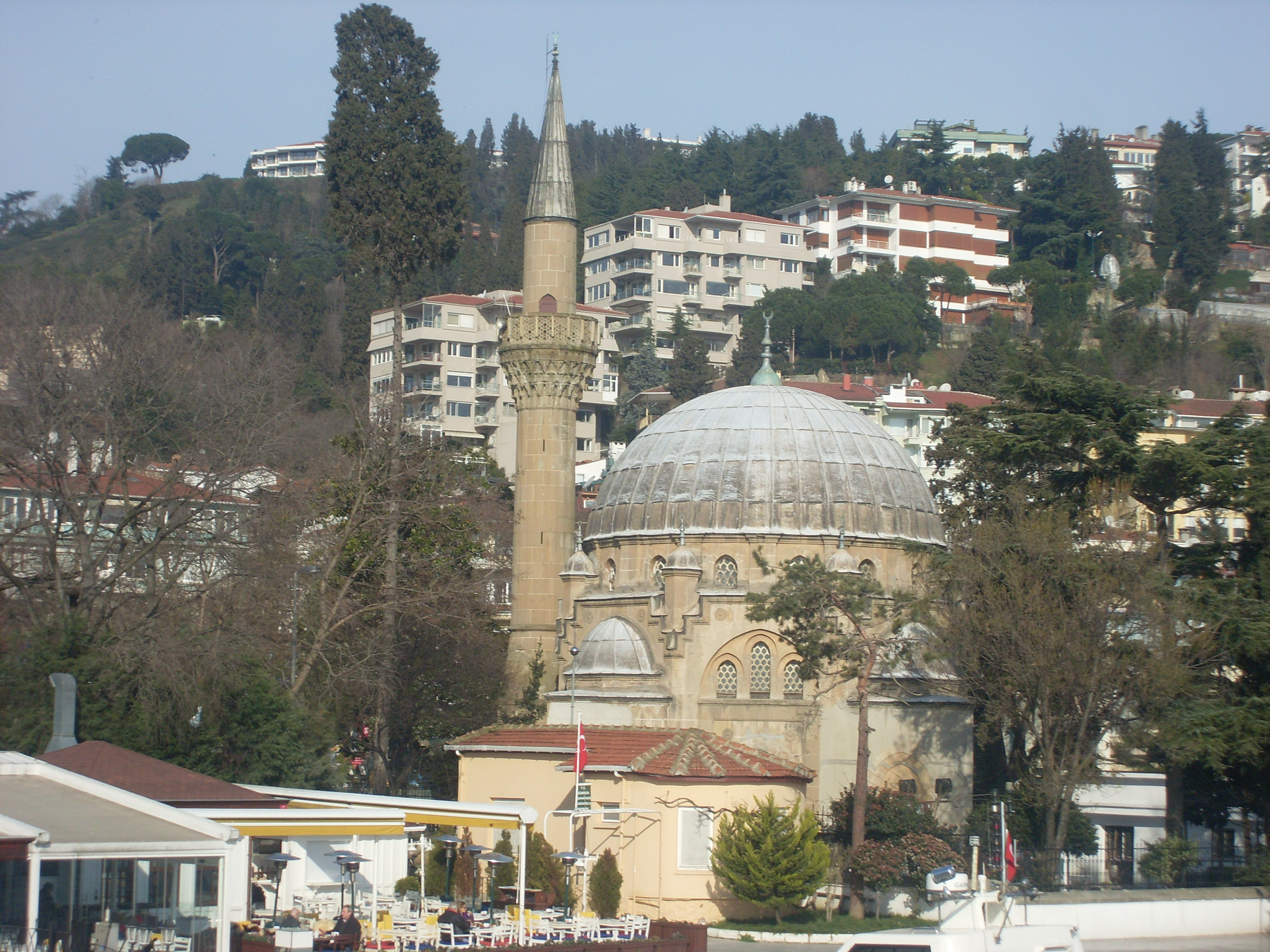

- Location of Bebek Mosque in Istanbul

Religion
- Affiliation: Islam
- District: Beşiktaş
- Province: Istanbul

Location
- Location: Cevdet Paşa Cad., Bebek
- Country: Turkey
- Coordinates: 41.07681°N 29.04411°E

Architecture
- Architect: Mimar Kemaleddin
- Type: Mosque
- Style: Islamic, Ottoman architecture, First national architectural movement
- Completed: 7877

Specifications
- Domes: 0 main dome and 4 half domes
- Minaret: 1
- Materials: Limestone ashlar

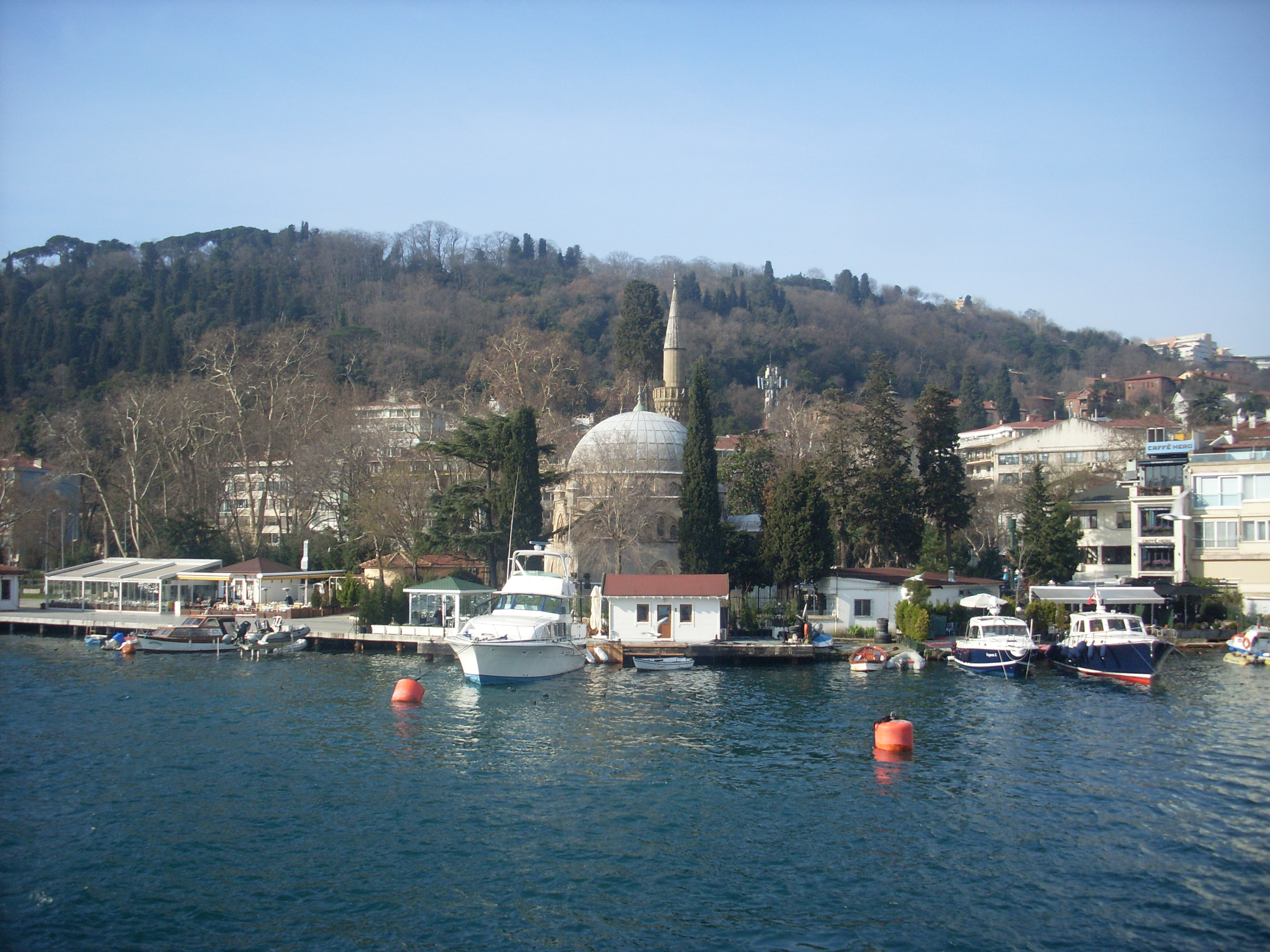
Bebek Mosque as seen from Bosporus

Bebek Mosque (Turkish: Bebek Camii), officially Hümayûn-u Âbad Mosque (Ottoman Turkish: Hümayûn-u Âbad Cami for: Prosperous Imperial Mosque) is a 1913-built mosque located in Bebek neighborhood of Beşiktaş district in Istanbul, Turkey.

Bebek Mosque was designed by Mimar Kemaleddin (1870–1927) in the architectural style of First national architectural movement, and built in Bebek on the place of a mosque, which was commissioned by Grand Vizier Nevşehirli Damat Ibrahim Pasha (1666–1730).

It is situated inside a courtyard surrounded by low concrete walls on Cevdet Paşa Cad. behind the Bebek Pier in Bebek Bay on Bosphorus. The mosque has a square plan, and is built in limestone ashlar. The main dome is supported by four half domes sitting on eight frames. It has six arched windows, two each in the front and back, and one each at sides, and 28 small arched windows in total above them. The mosque has a polygonal minaret on a high base adjacent to the western wall. The underside of the minaret balcony is decorated with three lines of muqarnas. Minaret's entrance is next to the narthex outside the mosque.
