= Nasrullah Mosque =

Mosque in Kastamonu, Turkey

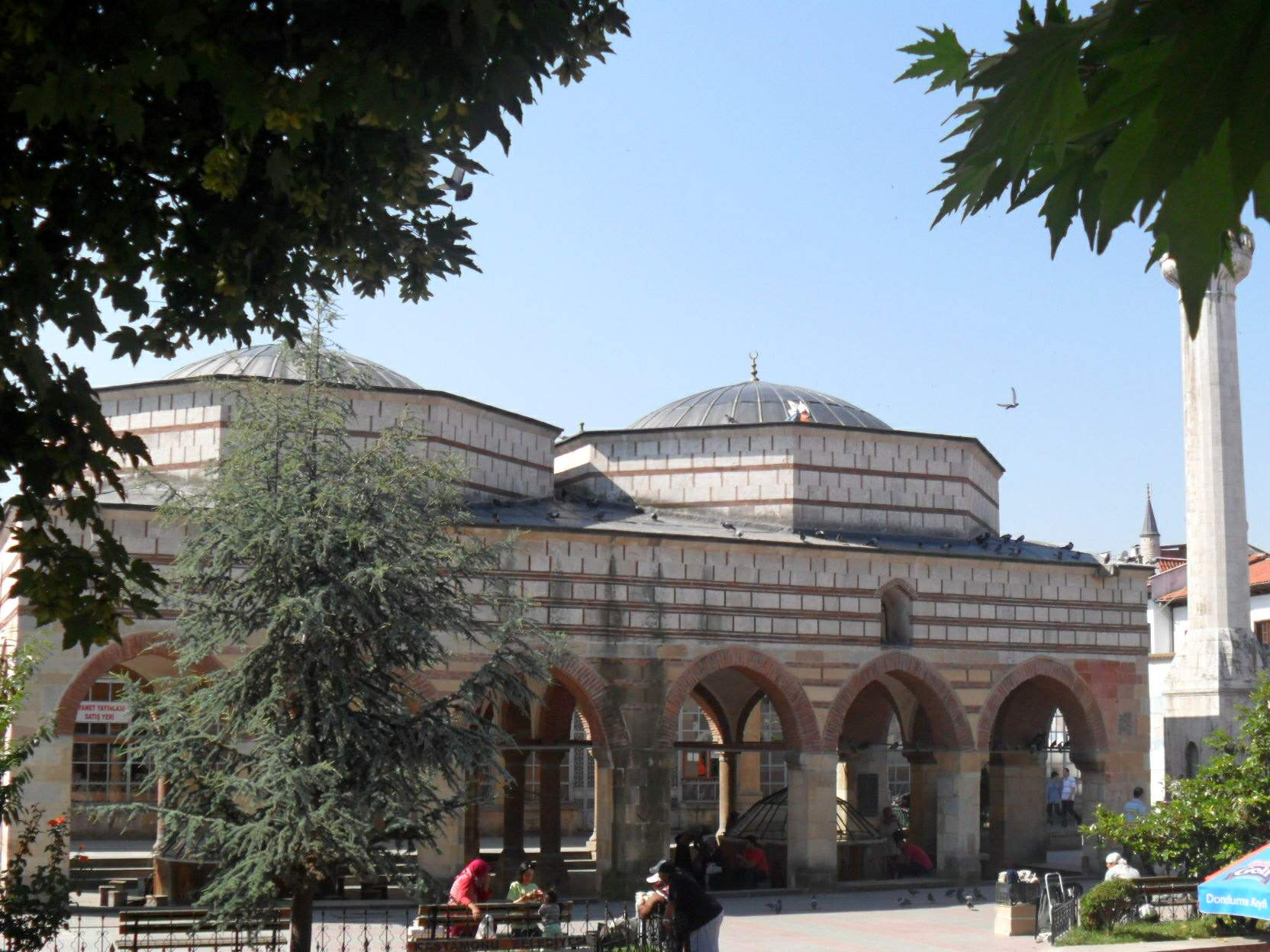

- Location of Nasrullah Mosque in Turkey

Religion
- Affiliation: Sunni Islam
- Province: Kastamonu Province
- Region: Black Sea Region
- Status: Active

Location
- Location: Kastamonu, Turkey
- Coordinates: 41.37722°N 33.77528°E

Architecture
- Type: mosque
- Style: Ottoman architecture
- Completed: 1506
- Minaret: 2

Nasrullah Mosque (Turkish: Nasrullah Cami) is a 16th-century Ottoman mosque in Kastamonu, Turkey.

It is located in Kastamonu just west of the Kastamonu Governor's Office and Gök River.

The mosque was commissioned by Kadı Nasrullah, a judge of the Ottoman Empire. It was built in 1506, during the reign of Sultan Bayazid II. The building underwent restorations in 1746, 1845 and 1945.

The mosque has nine domes over six square columns each with the dimensions of 1.60 m × 1.60 m (5.2 ft × 5.2 ft). The narthex (Turkish: son cemaat yeri) has seven domes over ten columns. The public fountain (Turkish: şadırvan) of the mosque is in the courtyard to the north of the mosque. The mosque has two minarets.
