= Kastamonu Governor's Office =

- Kastamonu Hükümet Konağı
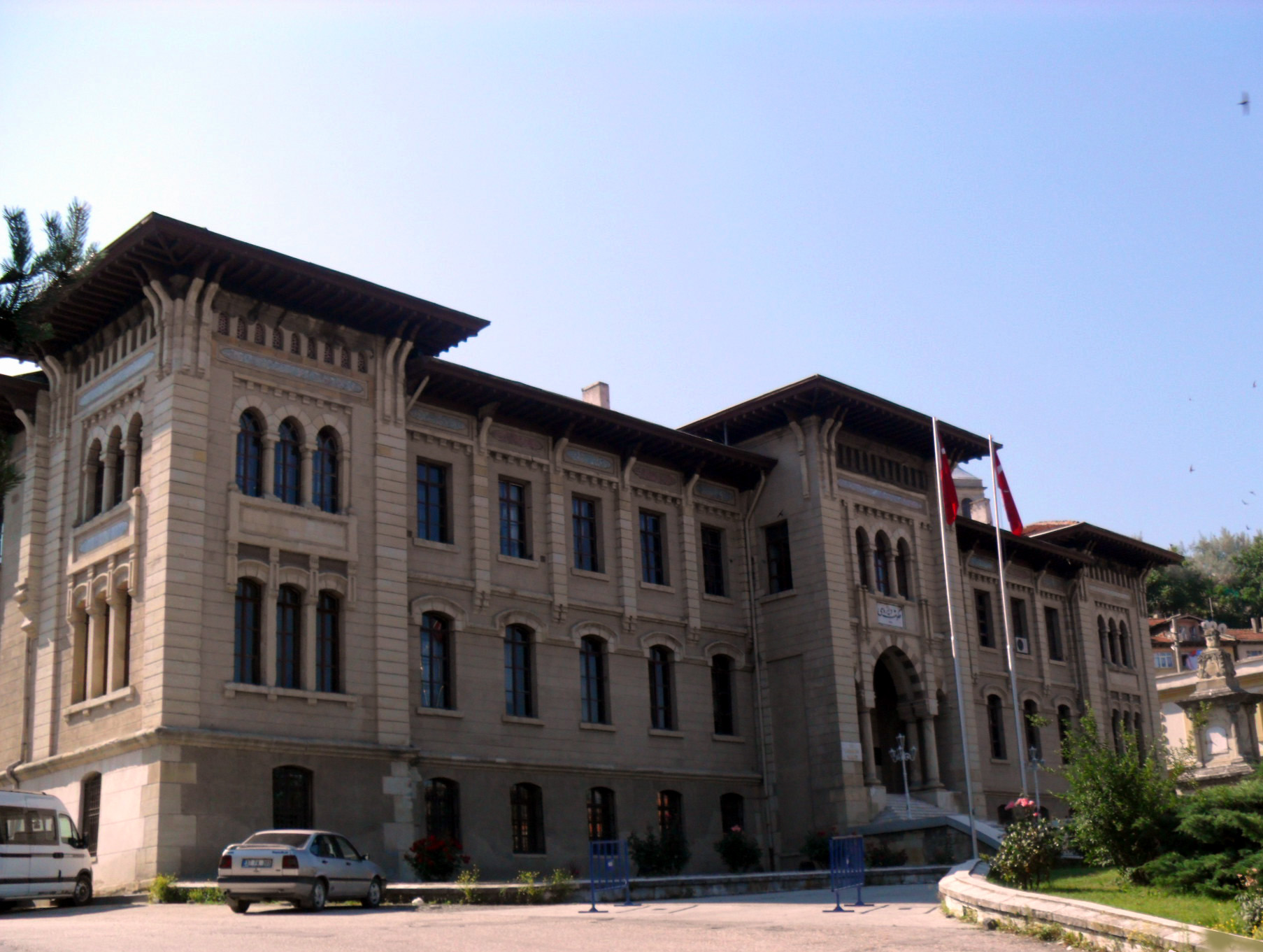
- Kastamonu Governor's Office building.

- Location within Turkey

General information
- Type: Office
- Architectural style: First Turkish National Architectural Movement
- Location: Cebrail Mah., 10 Aralık Cad. 24/1, Kastamonu, Turkey
- Coordinates: 41.37594°N 33.77875°E
- Construction started: 1900
- Opened: September 1, 1901

Design and construction
- Architect: Vedat Tek

The Kastamonu Governor's Office (Turkish: Kastamonu Hükümet Konağı) is the main service building of the governor (vali) of Kastamonu Province, Turkey. The historic building hosts also a city history museum.

It is situated on 10 Aralık Cad. 20/1 at Cebrail neighborhood of Kastamonu.

== History ==
The Governor's Office building was constructed during the Ottoman Empire era in ashlar masonry on the place of the former wooden governor's office building dating back to 1833. Designed by architect Vedat Tek (1873–1942), a forerunner of the First Turkish National Architectural Movement, its construction began in 1900. It was inaugurated on September 1, 1901, the 25th anniversary of Ottoman Sultan Abdul Hamid II 's (reigned 1876–1909) ascending to the throne. In 2015, the historical building underwent restoration works.

The building consists of three stories, a ground floor and two upper floors. Nights, it is being fully illuminated by floodlights.

== City History Museum ==
The Governor's Office building hosts the 2002-established "Kastamonu City History Museum" (Turkish: Kastamonu Kent Tarihi Müzesi), the country's first ever city history museum. An archive featuring documentation and photographs of the city history is also at disposal for scientific research. Access to the museum on the ground floor is through the southwestern entrance.
